= South Croydon (ward) =

Electoral ward in London, England

Coordinates: 51.356°N 0.089°W

- ward for Croydon Council
- Boundary of South Croydon in Croydon from 2018.
- County: Greater London

Current ward
- Created: 2018
- Councillor: Danielle Denton (Conservative)
- Councillor: Matthew Dormer (Conservative)
- Councillor: Micheal Neal (Conservative)
- Number of councillors: Three
- Created from: Croham
- UK Parliament constituency: Croydon South

South Croydon is a ward in the London Borough of Croydon, London in the United Kingdom, covering part of the Croham Hurst and South Croydon.

The ward returns three councillors every four years to Croydon Council. The ward held its first election in 2018. The ward has largely replaced the former Croham Ward. At the 2018 election, Maria Gatland, Michael Neal and Jason Perry were elected for South Croydon Ward, as Conservative Party candidates, becoming the first councillors for the ward. According to the Croydon Observatory, run by the Council, the 2016 population was 18,100

The ward is in Croydon South constituency held by Chris Philp MP, one of the safest Conservative seats in London. South Croydon and its predecessor wards of Croham and Sanderstead North have only ever elected Conservative candidates since the creation of the borough in 1965.

== List of councillors ==
Election	Councillor	Party	Councillor	Party	Councillor	Party
2018	Ward created					
2018	Maria Gatland	Conservative	Michael Neal	Conservative	Jason Perry	Conservative
2022 by-election	Maria Gatland	Conservative	Michael Neal	Conservative	Danielle Denton	Conservative
2026	Matthew Dormer	Conservative	Michael Neal	Conservative	Danielle Denton	Conservative

== Summary ==
Map of South Croydon ward since 2018

Councillors elected by party at each Croydon Council election.

== Mayoral elections ==
Below are the results for the candidate which received the highest share of the popular vote in the ward at each mayoral election.

Year	Mayoralty	Mayoral candidate	Party	Winner?
2021	Mayor of London	Shaun Bailey	Conservative	✗
2022	Mayor of Croydon	Jason Perry	Conservative	✓
2026	Mayor of Croydon	Jason Perry	Conservative	✓

== Croydon council elections ==
=== 2022 by-election ===
The by-election took place on 30 June 2022.

2022 South Croydon by-election
Party	Candidate	Votes	%	±%
Conservative	Danielle Denton	1,306	42.89	▲2.89
Labour	Benjamin Taylor	821	26.96	▼2.14
Liberal Democrats	John Jefkins	448	14.71	▲0.61
Green	Peter Underwood	269	8.83	▼5.57
Independent	Andrew Pelling	158	5.19	New
UKIP	Kathleen Garner	25	0.82	▼1.68
Independent	Mark Samuel	18	0.59	New
Majority		485	15.93	
Turnout		3,051		
Conservative hold		Swing	2.51	

=== 2022 election ===
The election took place on 5 May 2022.

2022 Croydon London Borough Council election: South Croydon (3)
Party	Candidate	Votes	%	±%
Conservative	Maria Gatland	1,898		
Conservative	Jason Perry	1,872		
Conservative	Michael Neal	1,688		
Labour	Bridget Galloway	1,378		
Labour	Joshua Andrew	1,359		
Labour	Tariq Hafeez	1,196		
Green	Steve Harris	682		
Liberal Democrats	Martin Drake	668		
Liberal Democrats	Michael Bishopp	659		
Green	Nayan Patel	605		
Liberal Democrats	Keith Miller	529		
Green	Marc Richards	508		
UKIP	Kathleen Garner	117		
Turnout		4,788	38.41	
Conservative hold		Swing		
Conservative hold		Swing		
Conservative hold		Swing		

=== 2018 election ===
The election took place on 3 May 2018.

2018 Croydon London Borough Council election: South Croydon (3)
Party	Candidate	Votes	%	±%
Conservative	Maria Gatland	2,345	18.02	
Conservative	Michael Neal	2,169	16.67	
Conservative	Jason Perry	2,108	16.20	
Labour	Stella Nabukeera	1,633	12.55	
Labour	Matthew Dimas Hill	1,606	12.34	
Labour	Paul Martin Waddell	1,575	12.11	
Green	Stephen Harris	442	3.40	
Liberal Democrats	Michael Thomas Albert Bishopp	438	3.37	
Green	Saima Raza	395	3.04	
Green	Marc Richards	339	2.61	
Liberal Democrats	Toby William Keynes	294	2.26	
Independent	Mark Robin Lionel Samuel	104	0.80	
Majority		475	3.65	
Turnout		4,719	40.08	
Registered electors		11,774		
Conservative win (new seat)				
Conservative win (new seat)				
Conservative win (new seat)				
