= Croham (ward) =

Former ward of Croydon, London, United Kingdom

- Former ward for Croydon Council
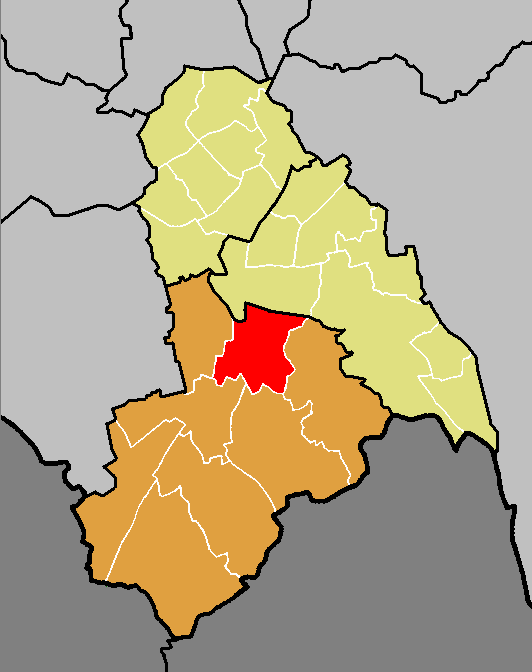
- Boundary of Croham in Croydon from 2002 to 2018.
- County: Greater London
- Electorate: 11,318

1978–2018
- Number of councillors: Three
- Replaced by: South Croydon
- Created from: Sanderstead North
- UK Parliament constituency: Croydon South

Croham was a ward in the London Borough of Croydon, London in the United Kingdom, covering part of the Croham Hurst and South Croydon. The ward returned three councillors every four years to Croydon Council. At the 2002 election, Maria Gatland, Michael Neal and Jason Perry were elected, as Conservative Party candidates, positions which they retained in the 2006, 2010 and 2014 elections. At the 2011 Census the population of the ward was 15,790.

The ward was in Croydon South constituency held by Chris Philp MP, one of the safest Conservative seats in London.

== Boundaries ==
=== 1978-2002 ===
Commencing at a point where the eastern boundary of Waddon Ward meets the southern boundary of Fairfield Ward, thence southeastwards along said southern boundary to the northwestern boundary of Heathfield Ward, thence southwestwards along said boundary and continuing southwestwards and southeastwards along the western boundary of the Croham Hurst Golf Course to Upper Selsdon Road, thence northwestwards along said road to Arkwright Road, thence southwestwards, southeastwards and southwestwards along said road to Briton Hill Road, thence westwards along said road to Sanderstead Road, thence southeastwards along said road to Purley Oaks Road, thence westwards along said road to the road known as Downsway, thence southwards along said road to a point opposite the northern boundary of No 2 Downsway thence northwestwards to and along said boundary and generally southwestwards along the rear boundaries of Nos 2-40 Downsway to the southern boundary of No 40 Downsway, thence southeastwards along said boundary to said road, thence southwestwards along said road to Purley Downs Road, thence northwestwards along said road to Grid Reference TQ 3278561842, thence southwestwards in a straight line to Grid Reference TQ 3270061700 being a point in prolongation southeastwards of the rear boundary of No 104 Purley Downs Road, thence northwestwards along said prolongation and the rear boundaries of Nos 104-98 Purley Downs Road to the Beckenham-Woodside railway, thence northeastwards along said railway to Purley Oaks Road, thence northwestwards along said road to the southeastern boundary of No 1 Station Approach, thence northeastwards along said boundary and northwestwards along the northeastern boundary of said property, and in continuation crossing the railway at Purley Oaks Station to Brantwood Road to the station, thence northeastwards along said road and northwestwards along Brantwood Road to Brighton Road, thence southwestwards along said road to Biddulph Road (northern arm), thence northwestwards along said road to the access road to the rear of Nos 544-436 Brighton Road, thence northeastwards along said access road to a point opposite the southwestern boundary of No 47 Kingsdown Avenue, thence northwestwards to and along said boundary and southwestwards along the rear boundaries of Nos 49-73 Kingsdown Avenue to the southwestern boundary of No 73 Kingsdown Avenue, thence northwestwards along said boundary to said avenue, thence northeast-wards along said avenue to Coningsby Road, thence northwestwards along said road to Mount Park Avenue, thence southwards along said avenue to a point opposite the southern boundary of No 52 Mount Park Avenue, thence northwestwards to and along said boundary to the eastern boundary of Waddon Ward, thence generally northwards along said boundary to the point of commencement.

=== 2002-2018 ===
Map of Croham ward between 2002 and 2018

== Councillors ==
Election	Councillor	Party	Notes	Councillor	Party	Notes	Councillor	Party	Notes
1978	Ward created								
1978	Paul W. Rickards	Conservative	Previously Councillor for Sanderstead North	Keith A. Wells	Conservative	Previously Councillor for Sanderstead North	William N. Peet	Conservative	Previously councillors for Sanderstead North
1982	Ian Croft	Conservative		Keith A. Wells	Conservative	Previously Councillor for Sanderstead North	John P.B. Hecks	Conservative	
1986	Ian Croft	Conservative		Peter Bowness	Conservative	Leader of the Council 1976-1994	John P.B. Hecks	Conservative	
1994	Andrew D.W. Berry	Conservative		Peter Bowness	Conservative	Leader of the Council 1976-1994	John P.B. Hecks	Conservative	
1998	Nicholas S. P-J. Keable	Conservative		Paul J. McCombie	Conservative		Mark B. Stockwell	Conservative	
2002	Maria Gatland	Conservative	Subsequently became Councillor for South Croydon	Jason Perry	Conservative	Subsequently became Councillor for South Croydon. Previously a Councillor in Coulsdon East, 1994-2002.	Michael Neal	Conservative	Subsequently became Councillor for South Croydon
2018	Ward abolished								

== Croham Election Results ==
=== 1978-2002 ===
==== 1978 ====
Croydon Council Election 1978: Croham (3)
Party	Candidate	Votes	%	±%
Conservative	Paul W. Rickards	2,989		
Conservative	Keith A. Wells	2,922		
Conservative	William N. Peet	2,907		
Labour	Wendy M. Holt	698		
Labour	Mary Jones	673		
Labour	Raymond G.M. Jones	664		
Liberal	Judith A. Stuart	386		
Liberal	Alan J. Hussey	355		
Liberal	John Hatherley	349		
Turnout			41.1%	
Registered electors		10,217		
Conservative hold		Swing		
Conservative hold		Swing		
Conservative hold		Swing		

==== 1982 ====
Croydon Council Election 1982: Croham (3)
Party	Candidate	Votes	%	±%
Conservative	Ian Croft	2,961		
Conservative	John P.B. Hecks	2,944		
Conservative	Keith A. Wells	2,884		
Alliance	Christopher G. Peacock	1,308		
Alliance	Richard T. Mascall	1,215		
Alliance	Richard E. Tudway	1,148		
Labour	William E. Short	382		
Labour	Pauline H. Scharp	373		
Labour	David J. White	342		
Turnout			44.8%	▲3.7%
Registered electors		10,187		
Conservative hold		Swing		
Conservative hold		Swing		
Conservative hold		Swing		

==== 1986 ====
Croydon Council Election 1986: Croham (3)
Party	Candidate	Votes	%	±%
Conservative	Ian Croft	2,315		
Conservative	Peter S. Bowness	2,225		
Conservative	John P.B. Hecks	2,189		
Alliance	James S. Forrest	2,117		
Alliance	Christopher G. Peacock	1,928		
Alliance	Stephen P.J. Maloney	1,905		
Labour	David J. White	401		
Labour	Pauline H. Scharp	399		
Labour	Claire E.M. Bailey Newton	372		
Green	Michael Spencer-Bowdage	255		
Turnout			48.3%	▲3.5%
Registered electors		10,479		
Conservative hold		Swing		
Conservative hold		Swing		
Conservative hold		Swing		

==== 1990 ====
Croydon Council Election 1990: Croham (3)
Party	Candidate	Votes	%	±%
Conservative	Ian Croft	2,813		
Conservative	Peter S. Bowness	2,750		
Conservative	John P.B. Hecks	2,656		
Liberal Democrats	Michael T.A. Bishopp	1,396		
Liberal Democrats	Christopher G. Peacock	1,351		
Liberal Democrats	Roger D. George	1,322		
Labour	Patrick D. Holt	727		
Labour	Lydia E. Sookias	613		
Labour	Michael G. Ryan	612		
Green	Michael Spencer-Bowdage	367		
Peoples Choice	Mark R.L. Samuel	79		
Turnout		5,103	50.8	▲2.5%
Registered electors		10,055		
Conservative hold		Swing		
Conservative hold		Swing		
Conservative hold		Swing		

==== 1994 ====
Croydon Council Election 1994: Croham (3)
Party	Candidate	Votes	%	±%
Conservative	Peter S. Bowness	2,556		
Conservative	John P.B. Hecks	2,533		
Conservative	Andrew D.W. Berry	2,511		
Liberal Democrats	Michael T.A. Bishopp	1,330		
Liberal Democrats	Christopher G. Peacock	1,294		
Liberal Democrats	Malcolm Saunders	1,249		
Labour	Maria T. Dennis	985		
Labour	Barry P. Buttigieg	955		
Labour	Jeffrey R. Primm	898		
Peoples Choice	Mark R.L. Samuel	122		
Turnout		5,055	50.6	▼0.2%
Registered electors		9,994		
Conservative hold		Swing		
Conservative hold		Swing		
Conservative hold		Swing		

==== 1998 ====
Croydon Council Election 1998: Croham (3)
Party	Candidate	Votes	%	±%
Conservative	Nicholas S. P-J. Keable	2,223		
Conservative	Paul J. McCombie	2,206		
Conservative	Mark B. Stockwell	2,127		
Labour	Alison J. Butler	1,060		
Labour	Beatrice A. Pollard	1,011		
Labour	Peter N. Horah	980		
Liberal Democrats	Sylvia W. Bishopp	611		
Liberal Democrats	Joan H. Leck	530		
Liberal Democrats	Geoffrey V. Gauge	526		
Independent	Graham Johnson	129		
Independent	Mark R.L. Samuel	84		
Turnout		4,052	40.0	▼10.6%
Registered electors		10,140		
Conservative hold		Swing		
Conservative hold		Swing		
Conservative hold		Swing		

=== 2002-2014 ===
==== 2002 ====
Croydon Council Election 2002: Croham (3)
Party	Candidate	Votes	%	±%
Conservative	Maria R. Gatland	2,100		
Conservative	Jason S. Perry	2,008		
Conservative	Michael A. Neal	1,984		
Liberal Democrats	Graham T. Dare	1,232		
Liberal Democrats	Sarah J. Newton	1,192		
Liberal Democrats	Gavin T. Howard-Jones	1,171		
Labour	Laura T. Doughty	681		
Labour	Stephen C. Moyse	647		
Labour	Louise F. Szpera	583		
UKIP	Brian P. Alchorn	106		
UKIP	Kathleen Garner	93		
Peoples Choice	Evelyn J. Lane	90		
Peoples Choice	Donald Pearce	71		
Peoples Choice	Mark R.L. Samuel	58		
Turnout		4,121	38.7	▼1.3%
Registered electors		10,639		
Conservative hold		Swing		
Conservative hold		Swing		
Conservative hold		Swing		

==== 2006 ====
Croydon Council Election 2006: Croham
Party	Candidate	Votes	%	±%
Conservative	Maria Gatland	2,590		
Conservative	Michael Neal	2,418		
Conservative	Jason Perry	2,378		
Liberal Democrats	Michael Bishopp	861		
Liberal Democrats	Sheelagh Crampton	739		
Labour	Laura Doughty	722		
Labour	Paul Anderson	697		
Liberal Democrats	Edward Maxfield	609		
Green	Stephen Harris	569		
Labour	James Mburu	566		
UKIP	William Bailey	206		
The People's Choice	Evelyn Lane	113		
The People's Choice	Debra Cannam	112		
The People's Choice	Mark Samuel	96		
Turnout		4,460	41.4%	▲2.7%
Registered electors		10,785		
Conservative hold		Swing		
Conservative hold		Swing		
Conservative hold		Swing		

==== 2010 ====
Croydon Council Election 2010: Croham
Party	Candidate	Votes	%	±%
Conservative	Maria Gatland	3,389		
Conservative	Michael Neal	3,070		
Conservative	Jason Perry	2,804		
Labour	Natalie Allen	1,806		
Liberal Democrats	John Jefkins	1,795		
Liberal Democrats	Martin Camden	1,778		
Liberal Democrats	Simon Rix	1,758		
Labour	Martin Angus	1,512		
Labour	Adam Bonner	1,343		
Green	Stephen Harris	538		
Green	Muriel Passmore	507		
UKIP	William Bailey	444		
Green	Marc Richards	433		
Putting Croydon First	Mark Samuel	218		
Turnout		7,582	67.04%	▲25.64%
Registered electors		11,309		
Conservative hold		Swing		
Conservative hold		Swing		
Conservative hold		Swing		

==== 2014 ====
Croydon Council Election 2014: Croham
Party	Candidate	Votes	%	±%
Conservative	Maria Gatland	2,042		
Conservative	Michael Neal	1,910		
Conservative	Jason Perry	1,803		
Labour	Christopher Clark	1,100		
Labour	Paul Waddell	1,099		
Labour	Claudine Reid	1,011		
UKIP	Kathleen Garner	629		
Liberal Democrats	Michael Bishopp	587		
Green	Tracey Hague	515		
Liberal Democrats	Ben Devlin	505		
Liberal Democrats	John Jefkins	500		
Green	Gordon Halliday	479		
Green	Sasha Khan	474		
Putting Croydon First	Mark Samuel	191		
Independent	Tony Martin	97		
Turnout		4,315	41.10%	▼25.94%
Registered electors		11,318		
Conservative hold		Swing		
Conservative hold		Swing		
Conservative hold		Swing		
