= South Croydon =

Area of London

Coordinates: 51.3532°N 0.0962°W

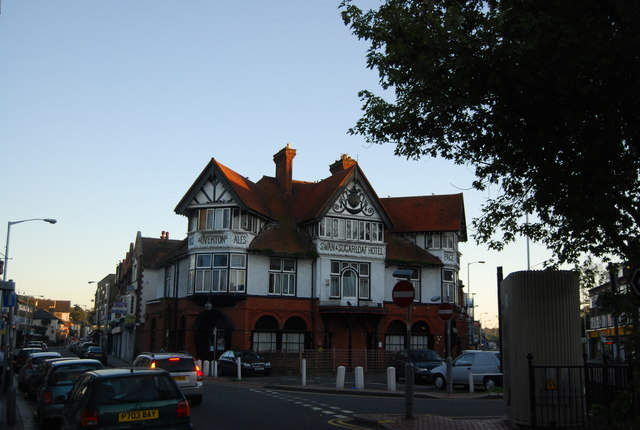
- Swan and Sugar Loaf

- Location within Greater London
- Population: 15,790 (South Croydon ward)
- OS grid reference: TQ325633
- London borough: Croydon
- Ceremonial county: Greater London
- Region: London
- Country: England
- Sovereign state: United Kingdom
- Post town: SOUTH CROYDON
- Postcode district: CR2
- Dialling code: 020
- Police: Metropolitan
- Fire: London
- Ambulance: London
- UK Parliament: Croydon South
- London Assembly: Croydon and Sutton

South Croydon in south London is the area surrounding the valley south of central Croydon and running as far south as the former Red Deer public house on the Brighton Road. It is bounded by Waddon to the West and Selsdon and Sanderstead to the East. It is part of the South Croydon (CR2) post town and in the London Borough of Croydon.

The area was developed in the 19th century out of land lying in two ancient manors, Croham and Haling. The names of these can still be seen in the area today, and the locations of the manor houses can be found in the Croham Manor Road conservation area and in Whitgift School. Much of the land of South Croydon has been associated through the years with the Whitgift Foundation whose charitable work has benefited and influenced Croydon since its foundation in 1596.

== History ==
The placename Croydon is recorded as early as 809 and is listed in the 1086 Domesday Book, where it is described as the land held in Demesne by Lanfranc, the Archbishop of Canterbury in Waletone (that is Wallington) hundred. In the medieval and early modern periods the town limits, within which the inhabitants enjoyed certain privileges of self-government and tenure, were defined by boundary markers known as the "four crosses": beyond these markers, the more restrictive rules of manorial tenure applied. The southernmost marker, Hern Cross, was cut in an elm tree at the southern end of the High Street. Plaques marking the sites of the crosses (including that of Hern Cross, on the former Blacksmiths Arms, now the Corner House, at the corner of Coombe Road and South End) were erected by the Croydon Rotary Clubs in 1977.

South Croydon as a distinct area south of Hern Cross is found much later, in the 19th century, when the area was developed as a residential suburb in land lying within the ancient manors of Croham and Haling. Croham Manor and the Croham area were purchased in 1601 by the Whitgift Foundation. Croham was one of four manors in the parish of Sanderstead, and included surrounding farm land and Croham Hurst. The Whitgift Foundation was and remains a charity providing care for the elderly and education for young people in Croydon. Land in South Croydon supported the foundation's work elsewhere in Croydon but in 1931 Whitgift School moved to its current South Croydon site, Haling Park. The manor of Haling lay in the parish of Croydon, and covered 400 acres. It was notable in Tudor times as the home to Lord Howard of Effingham, the Lord High Admiral of the Fleet sent against the Spanish Armada, and was host to a succession of royalty and notable visits. The estate was sold for building in 1850 and Whitgift school now occupies manor house buildings dating to the 17th century.

With the advent of stage coaches, a London to Brighton route was established, with horses being changed in Croydon. Stables were built in South Croydon at Crunden Place, near the Red Deer inn on the Brighton Road; these were used by the coaching business. These stables would later become the location of South Croydon bus garage, which now opens on to Crunden Road as well as the Brighton Road.

Croham Hurst was bought as an open space for local people from the Whitgift Foundation by Croydon Corporation in 1901, an area of 34 hectares. This was after three years of local campaigning by residents against development of the area by the Whitgift Foundation.

== Geography ==
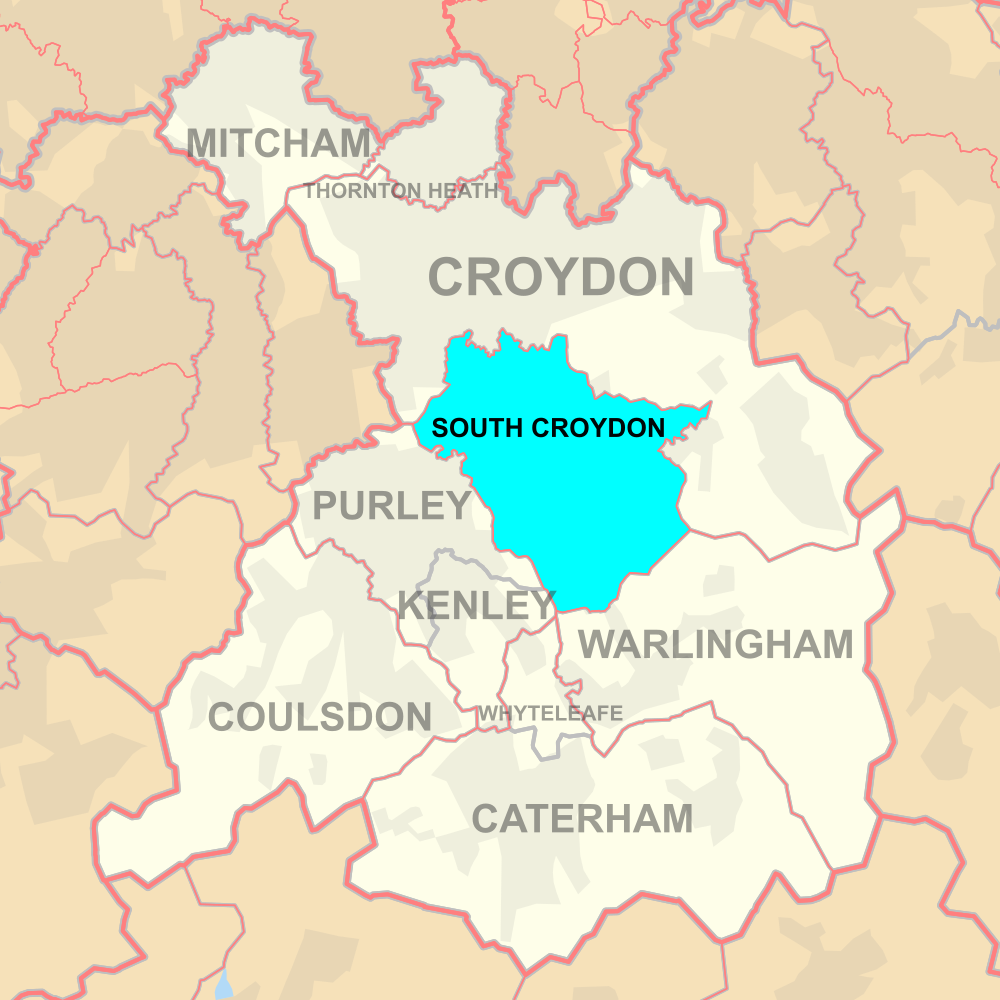
South Croydon postcode district

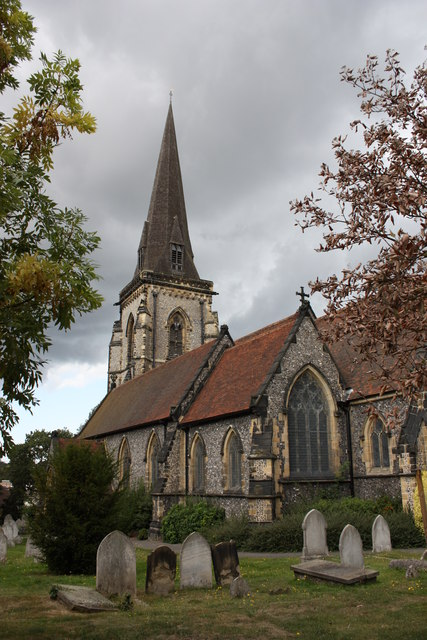
St Peter's Church

The area is bounded by the South Croydon electoral ward of the London Borough of Croydon. To the west and south it is bounded by the historic Croydon parish boundary, which runs from Conduit Lane to Croham Hurst, crossing Croham Road where it becomes Croham Valley Road, then across to the railway line, crossing Selsdon Road where it becomes Upper Selsdon Road and crossing Carlton Road where it becomes Mayfield Road. Thereafter the old parish boundary roughly follows the railway south as far as the Red Deer public house, beyond which lies Purley Oaks. Curiously, Purley Oaks Primary School lies on the South Croydon side of the boundary and not in Purley Oaks and Riddlesdown ward.

The much larger postal district of South Croydon includes Sanderstead, Selsdon and two remnants of Addington, Croham Valley and Monks Hill. Green space is provided to the west by the Purley Way Playing Fields, Croham Hurst and the hidden green space with gardens that is Haling Grove sandwiched between Pampisford Road and the A23: the extensive Whitgift School playing fields frequently host international cricket and rugby matches.

The Wandle river, a tributary of the Thames, found its source in South Croydon in modern times. A meeting of two streams at the Swan and Sugar loaf is one traditional site for the source, whereas a chalk spring closer to the Red Deer, one of the two streams that meet at the Swan, is also discussed as the source. Extraction of water from chalk aquifers, however, has caused the spring to dry up and the Wandle is culverted and not visible within South Croydon.

=== Education ===
South Croydon has the following schools:

Current South Croydon Schools
Name	Type	Mix	Status	Enrollment
Atwood Primary	Primary	Mixed	Academy	n.d.
Elmhurst School	Primary	Mixed	Independent	n.d.
Greenvale Primary	Primary	Mixed	Maintained	217
Gresham	Primary	Mixed	Maintained	247
Gilbert Scott Primary	Primary	Mixed	Maintained	224
Harris Academy Purley (Note: formerly Haling Manor High School, this school is in South Croydon and not Purley.)	Secondary	Mixed	Academy	n.d.
Howard Primary	Primary	Mixed	Maintained	408
Purley Oaks (Note: This school is in South Croydon and not Purley Oaks and was originally called Brighton Road school.)	Primary	Mixed	Maintained	642
Regina Coeli Catholic	Primary	Mixed	Catholic	411
Ridgeway	Primary	Mixed	Maintained	660
St Peter's	Primary	Mixed	Academy	n.d.
St Giles School (specialist for disabled)		Mixed	Special	102
Selsdon Primary	Primary	Mixed	Maintained	n.d.
The Quest Academy (Note: Formed from the former Selsdon High School and Monks Hill Comprehensive School)	Secondary	Mixed	Academy	n.d.
Whitgift	Secondary	Boys	Independent	n.d.

Church schools (Catholic and C. of E.) are Voluntary aided schools, which means that they are maintained by the local education authority (LEA) but received additional voluntary funding from church sources.

The electoral ward of South Croydon now omits Whitgift School but includes Royal Russell School in the Shirley postcode area.

=== Nearest places ===
- Croydon (town)
- Coombe
- Coulsdon
- Selsdon
- Sanderstead
- Riddlesdown
- Kenley
- Purley
- Purley Way
- Croydon Airport
- Waddon

== Landmarks ==
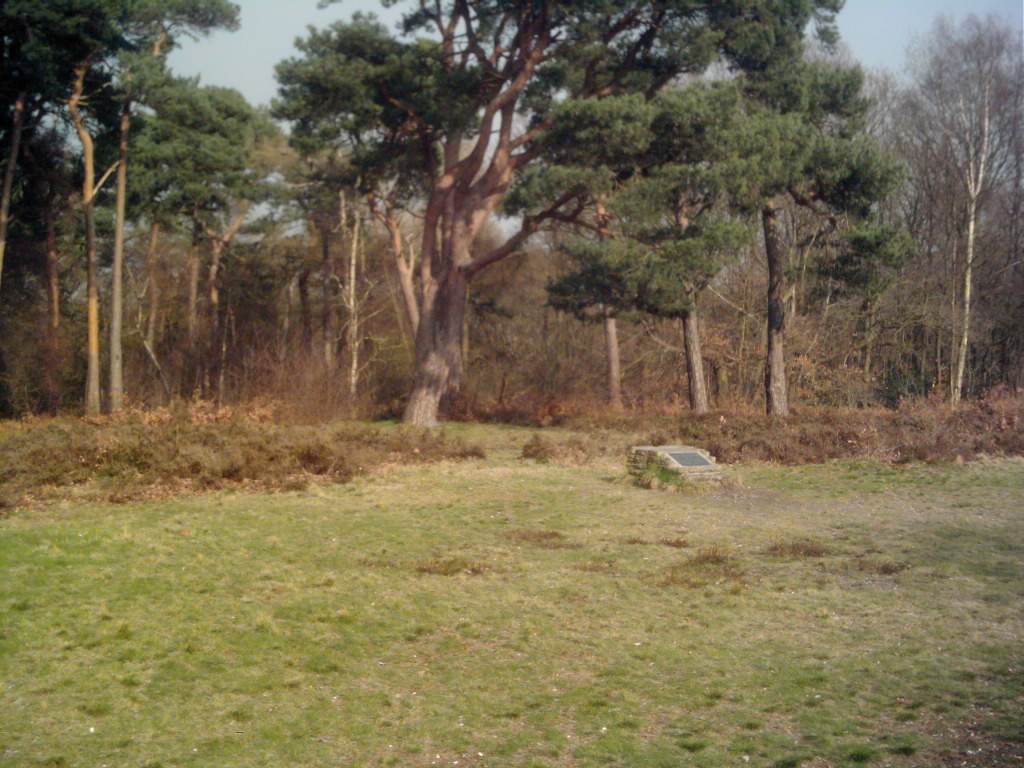
Croham Hurst round barrow (marker stone)

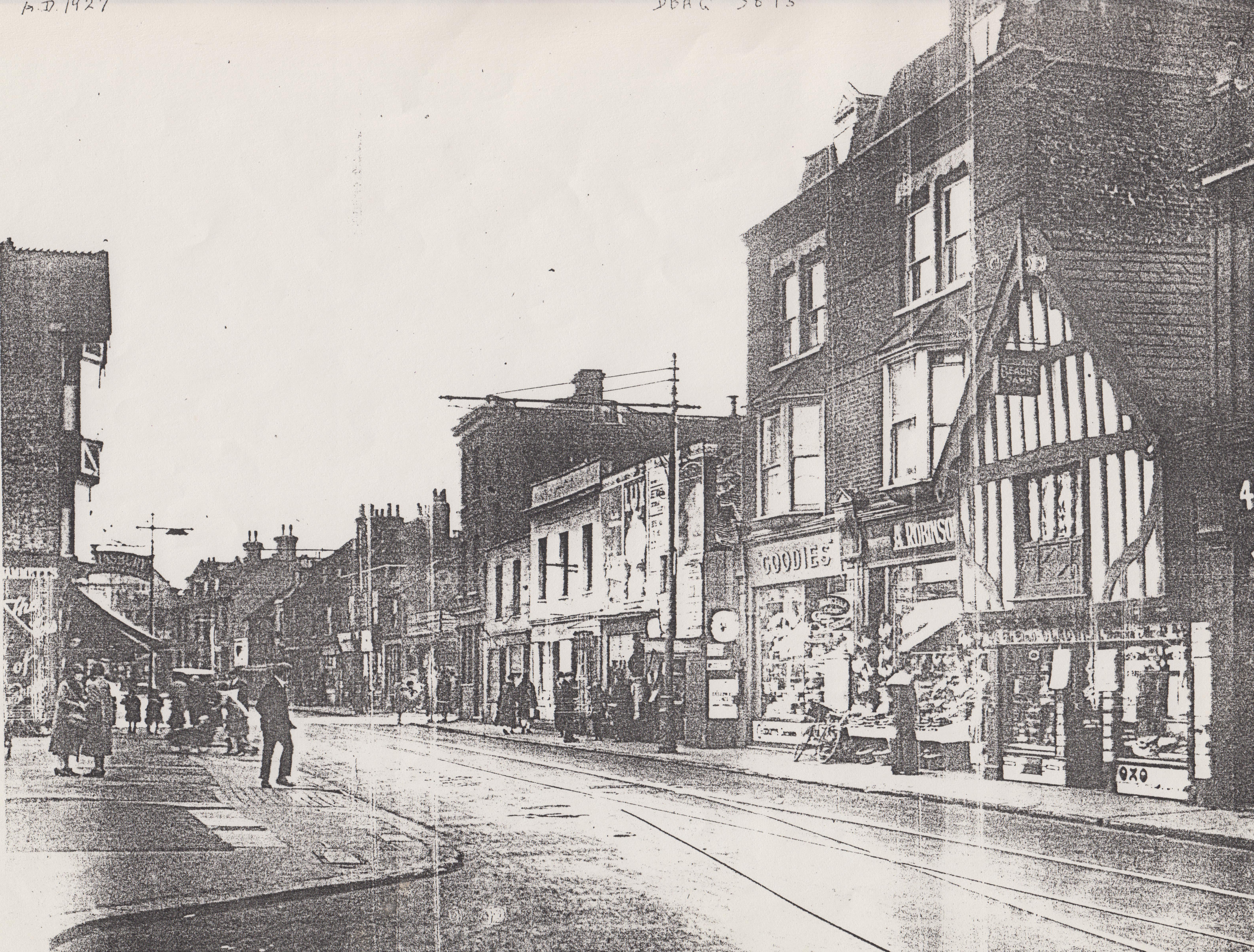
46 South End and historical tramlines

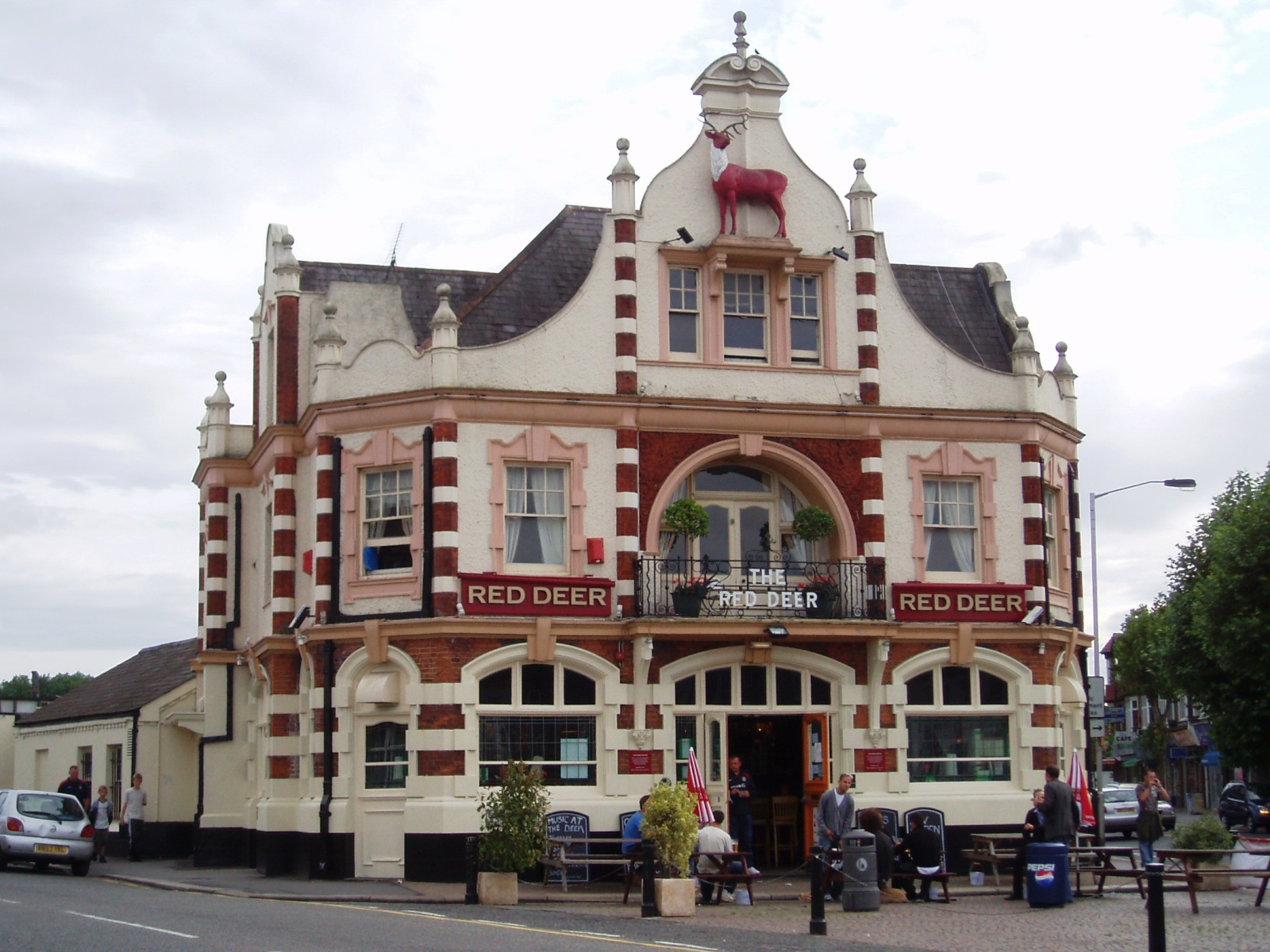
Red Deer Inn and Public House

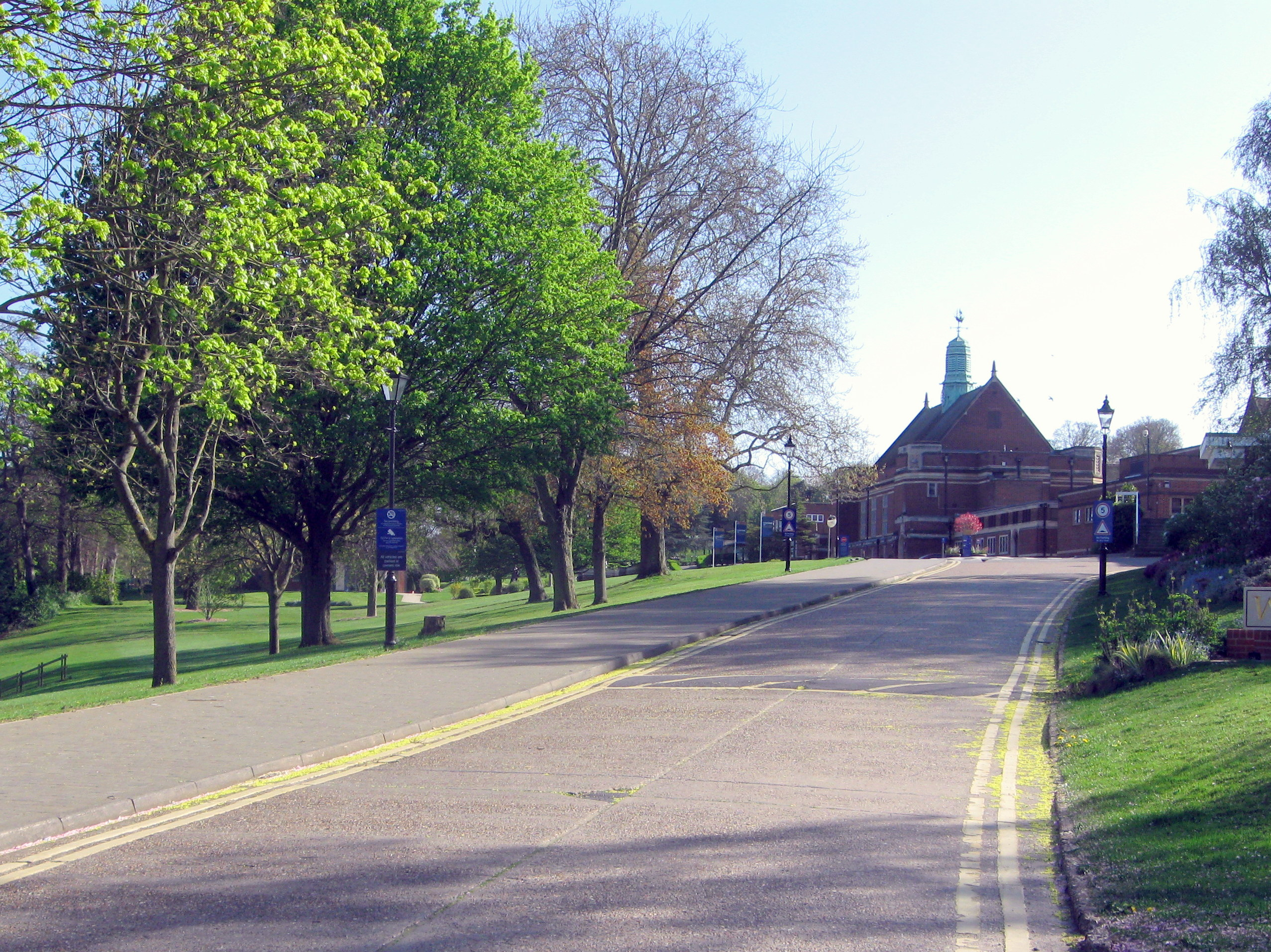
Whitgift School; view from main entrance

A number of landmarks are recognised within South Croydon, including the following.

=== Churches ===
==== Emmanuel Church ====
Emmanuel Church was opened in 1897. The church was funded by the Watney Sisters whose family ran the eponymous brewery firm.

==== St Augustine's Church ====
This flint walled church was designed by John Oldrid Scott and built in 1884.

==== St Peter's Church ====
St Peter's Church is a Grade II listed building. It was designed by George Gilbert Scott and dedicated in 1851.

=== Croham Hurst ===
Croham Hurst is a 33.6 hectare (83.02 acre) biological Site of Special Scientific Interest (SSSI) and a Site of Metropolitan Importance for Nature Conservation. Its SSSI designation is due to its importance for nature conservation, but it is also a Regionally Important Geological Site.

The site is a steep hill, which is ancient woodland, although there are few very old trees because until the railways made cheap coal available, the timber was used for fuel. On the lower slopes there is a diverse community of plants dominated by oak and hazel on rich soils overlying chalk. Further up the trees are mainly beech on Thanet Sands, and towards the top the main trees are oak and birch on the acidic Blackheath pebble beds.

The Thanet Sands have eroded, but the Blackheath beds are bound by a natural cement, and this has resisted erosion to make a natural cap to the hill. The top is mainly bare of trees, with rounded pebbles made when the area was the base of shallow seas in the Eocene epoch around 50 million years ago. The sparse vegetation at the top is mainly wavy hair-grass, heather and bilberry.

=== Croham Manor Conservation Area ===
The Croham Manor Road Conservation Area lies in South Croydon, running from the junction with the Selsdon Road along the West side of Croham Hurst. The area is notable for its distinctive and planned 1930s architecture.

=== South Croydon bus garage ===
South Croydon bus garage is located on the corner of Brighton and Napier Roads. The site was previously the location of Crunden Place stables that were used by coaching companies. Built by the London General Omnibus Company, the garage was handed over to Thomas Tilling upon opening on 23 January 1916 as part of an agreement between the two operators. In 1933 it passed with the business to the London Passenger Transport Board and each subsequent operator of the London Transport brand.

The garage underwent roof reconstruction in the early 1930s to allow double decker buses to use it. The building was destroyed in May 1941 in an air raid that killed seven staff. The reconstruction was not completed until the mid-1950s. As part of the privatisation of London bus services, in January 1995 it was sold to Arriva London with the South London business unit as their Croydon (TC) garage. Arriva continue to use it to operate services under contract to Transport for London.

=== 46 South End ===
46 South End is Croydon's oldest surviving shop. The building is Grade II listed, dating back to the 17th century. It retains its original timber framing and the front has distinctive and attractive elevations. The rear of the building is partly of modern construction. Since 1985 it has been home to Just Flutes, a music shop.

=== The Red Deer ===
This Victorian era inn was open by 1851 in a prominent location on the Brighton Road. It acted as a local landmark as a tram and train terminus and also gave its name to bus stops. The inn and pub were closed in 2013.

=== The Swan and Sugarloaf ===
Although not the original hotel, the Swan and Sugarloaf is a landmark in South Croydon that gave its name to the surrounding area, now known as The Swan. The hotel stands at the junction of the Brighton and Selsdon Roads and the original hotel began as a farm house. It was part of the property that Archbishop John Whitgift devoted to his hospital in the 16th century. Much of South Croydon was such Whitgift land. The building was decorated with the Archbishop's arms, which were a cone or sugarloaf hat and a crook, which resembled in shape the curve of a swan's neck. It was this resemblance that led to local people misunderstanding the heraldic symbols and the farmstead became known as the Swan and Sugarloaf, a name that was retained when it was later licensed as a public house and hotel. (Note: "Swan and Sugar Loaf. — This is the title of a well-known Inn at the junction of the Brighton and Selsdon roads. It was originally a farm house, and forms part of the property devoted by Archbishop Whitgift to his hospital. Formerly it was decorated rudely with the Archbishop's arms, a cone or sugar-loaf hat, and a bent crook, resembling the curve of a swan's neck ; hence it obtained the name of the Swan and Sugar Loaf from the common people, who did not understand heraldic signs. When the house was licensed, it retained the name by which the farmstead was familiarly known.") The Swan and Sugar Loaf no longer operates as an inn, and was converted to a branch of the Tesco Express Minimarket in 2012; despite local pressures against the conversion to preserve locally owned shops in the area. Despite this, the area is still known locally as "Swan and Sugar Loaf" and it still lends its name to the nearby bus stops.

=== Whitgift School ===
Whitgift School was founded in 1596 by the Archbishop of Canterbury John Whitgift and opened in 1600 as part of the Whitgift Foundation, which had the aim of building a hospital and school in Croydon for the "poor, needy and impotent people" from the parishes of Croydon and Lambeth. Originally located in North End, Croydon in 1931 it moved to its current site, Haling Park, which was once home to Lord Howard of Effingham, the Lord High Admiral of the Fleet sent against the Spanish Armada.

== Transport ==
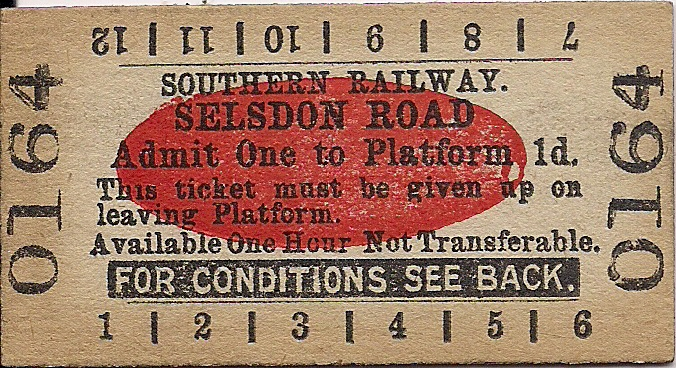
Platform ticket for now closed Selsdon Road Station

=== Nearest railway stations ===
- South Croydon
- Purley Oaks
- Sanderstead
- Riddlesdown
- Selsdon Road – closed
- Spencer Road halt – closed
- Coombe Road railway station – closed

=== Tramlink ===
- Lloyd Park tram stop

== Government ==
The area is largely covered by the South Croydon ward of Croydon Council, which elected 3 Conservatives in the last local elections in May 2018. Parts of the area are also in Fairfield ward, which elected 3 Labour Councillors in May 2018 and two Green and one Labour MP in 2022.

The area is split between the Parliamentary Constituencies of Croydon Central and Croydon South, with the area near South End located in Croydon Central, and the rest of the area located in Croydon South.

Councillors for South Croydon Ward
Election	Councillor	Party	Councillor	Party	Councillor	Party
2018	Ward created					
2018	Maria Gatland	Conservative	Michael Neal	Conservative	Jason Perry	Conservative
2022 by-election	Maria Gatland	Conservative	Michael Neal	Conservative	Danielle Denton	Conservative

Councillors for Fairfield Ward (including South End, South Croydon)
Election	Councillor	Party	Councillor	Party	Councillor	Party
1978	Ward created					
1978	Bob W. Coatman	Conservative	John L. Aston	Conservative	Peter R. Gilham	Conservative
1982	Bob W. Coatman	Conservative	John L. Aston	Conservative	Michael D. Wunn	Conservative
1994	Bob W. Coatman	Conservative	Richard J. Billington	Conservative	Michael D. Wunn	Conservative
1998	Bob W. Coatman	Conservative	Patricia F. L. Knight	Conservative	Michael D. Wunn	Conservative
2002	Bob W. Coatman	Conservative	Patricia F. L. Knight	Conservative	Audrey-Marie N. Yates	Conservative
July 2002	Bob W. Coatman	Conservative	Patricia F. L. Knight	Labour	Audrey-Marie N. Yates	Conservative
March 2003	Bob W. Coatman	Conservative	Patricia F. L. Knight	Conservative	Audrey-Marie N. Yates	Conservative
2004	Bob W. Coatman	Conservative	Patricia F. L. Knight	Independent	Audrey-Marie N. Yates	Conservative
2005	Bob W. Coatman	Conservative	Patricia F. L. Knight	Liberal Democrat	Audrey-Marie N. Yates	Conservative
2005 by-election	Bob W. Coatman	Conservative	Patricia F. L. Knight	Liberal Democrat	Vidhi Mohan	Conservative
2006	Susan Winborn	Conservative	David Fitze	Conservative	Vidhi Mohan	Conservative
2014	Susan Winborn	Conservative	Helen Pollard	Conservative	Vidhi Mohan	Conservative
2018	Mary Croos	Labour	Chris Clark	Labour	Niroshan Sirisena	Labour
2019 by-election	Mary Croos	Labour	Chris Clark	Labour	Caragh Skipper	Labour
2022	Ria Patel	Green	Chris Clark	Labour	Esther Sutton	Green
