= 2002 Croydon London Borough Council election =

2002 local election in England

Croydon Council Election, 2002
- 4 May 2002

All 70 seats to Croydon London Borough Council 36 seats needed for a majority
- Turnout: 34.5%
	First party	Second party	Third party
Leader	Hugh Malyan	Dudley Mead	Ian Atkins
Party	Labour	Conservative	Liberal Democrats
Leader since	1999	1998	1998
Leader's seat	Upper Norwood	Selsdon & Ballards	Coulsdon East
Last election	38 seats, 38.2%	31 seats, 47.5%	1 seat, 12.1%
Seats won	37	32	1
Seat change	▼1	▲1	Steady
Popular vote	31,871	37,908	27,608
Percentage	38.0%	45.2%	12.2%
- Map of the results of the 2002 Croydon council election. Conservatives in blue, Labour in red, Labour Co-operative in dark red and Liberal Democrats in yellow
Leader of the Council. before election
Hugh Malyan
Labour
Elected Leader
Hugh Malyan
Labour

Elections to Croydon Council in London, England were held on 4 May 2002. The council was up for election for the first time since the 1998 election. The Labour Party managed to keep control of the council which it had done since 1994 when it took power from the Conservative Party. This year Labour held Croydon with a smaller majority, only clinging onto power through a tiny number of votes in its marginal wards - one councillor won by just eight votes.

37 Labour councillors, 32 Conservative councillors and 1 Liberal Democrat councillor were elected, maintaining Labour control of the Council. Subsequently, one Conservative councillor defected to Labour, defected back to the Conservatives, became an independent and then a Liberal Democrat.

== Election result ==
Croydon local election result 2002
Party	Seats	Gains	Losses	Net gain/loss	Seats %	Votes %	Votes	+/−
Conservative	32			+1	45.7	45.2	37,908	
Labour	37			-1	52.9	38.0	31,871	
Liberal Democrats	1				1.4	12.2	10,257	
Independent	0					1.7	1,469	
People's Choice	0					1.2	1,012	
UKIP	0					1.1	948	
Green	0					0.3	278	
Monster Raving Loony	0					0.2	209	

↓
37	1	32
Labour	LD	Con

== Ward results ==
=== Addiscombe ===
Addiscombe (3)
Party	Candidate	Votes	%	±%
Labour Co-op	Amanda Campbell	2,140		
Labour Co-op	Mark Watson	1,968		
Labour Co-op	Sean Fitzsimons	1,940		
Conservative	Desmond Wright	1,383		
Conservative	Alexander Camden	1,366		
Conservative	Ronald Richens	1,329		
People's Choice	Stephen Collins	453		
People's Choice	Carol West	404		
People's Choice	Stephen Collins	387		
Majority				
Turnout				
Labour Co-op hold		Swing		
Labour Co-op hold		Swing		
Labour Co-op hold		Swing		

=== Ashburton ===
Ashburton (3)
Party	Candidate	Votes	%	±%
Conservative	Edwin Arram	2,005		
Conservative	Avril Slipper	1,999		
Conservative	Derek Loughborough	1,967		
Labour	Stephen Harris	1,662		
Labour	Hugh Allwood	1,598		
Labour	George Ayres	1,584		
People's Choice	Jack Windus	240		
Majority				
Turnout				
Conservative hold		Swing		
Conservative hold		Swing		
Conservative hold		Swing		

=== Bensham Manor ===
Bensham Manor (3)
Party	Candidate	Votes	%	±%
Labour Co-op	Alexander Burridge	2,096		
Labour Co-op	Paula Shaw	2,035		
Labour Co-op	Greta Sohoye	1,887		
Conservative	Florence Evans	668		
Conservative	Roger Taylor	656		
Conservative	William Proudfoot	580		
UKIP	James Feisenberger	163		
Majority				
Turnout				
Labour Co-op hold		Swing		
Labour Co-op hold		Swing		
Labour Co-op hold		Swing		

=== Broad Green ===
Broad Green (3)
Party	Candidate	Votes	%	±%
Labour	Stuart Collins	1,737		
Labour	Timothy Godfrey	1,634		
Labour	Michael Selvanayagam	1,594		
Conservative	Ian Parker	591		
Conservative	Keith Pearson	514		
Conservative	Jill Thomas	492		
UKIP	Christopher Pearce	264		
Majority				
Turnout				
Labour hold		Swing		
Labour hold		Swing		
Labour hold		Swing		

=== Coulsdon East ===
Coulsdon East (3)
Party	Candidate	Votes	%	±%
Liberal Democrats	Ian Atkins	2,485		
Conservative	Christopher Wright	2,445		
Conservative	Brian Udell	2,330		
Liberal Democrats	David Howard	2,305		
Conservative	Valerie Dunmore	2,304		
Liberal Democrats	Steven Gauge	2,271		
Labour	Julie Candy	294		
Labour	Maggie Conway	292		
Labour	Ruth Bannister	279		
Majority				
Turnout				
Liberal Democrats hold		Swing		
Conservative hold		Swing		
Conservative hold		Swing		

=== Coulsdon West ===
Coulsdon West (3)
Party	Candidate	Votes	%	±%
Conservative	David Osland	2,083		
Conservative	Anna Hawkins	2,081		
Conservative	Gavin Barwell	2,040		
Labour	Raymond Berry	788		
Labour	Wayne Lawlor	729		
Labour	Aslam Hoda	710		
Liberal Democrats	Kathleen Austin	595		
Liberal Democrats	Avril Bristow	592		
Liberal Democrats	Linda Evans	582		
Majority				
Turnout				
Conservative hold		Swing		
Conservative hold		Swing		
Conservative hold		Swing		

=== Croham ===
Croham (3)
Party	Candidate	Votes	%	±%
Conservative	Maria Gatland	2,100		
Conservative	Jason Perry	2,008		
Conservative	Michael Neal	1,984		
Liberal Democrats	Graham Dare	1,232		
Liberal Democrats	Sarah Newton	1,192		
Liberal Democrats	Gavin Howard-Jones	1,171		
Labour	Laura Doughty	681		
Labour	Stephen Moyse	647		
Labour	Louise Szpera	583		
UKIP	Brian Alchorn	106		
UKIP	Kathleen Garner	93		
Peoples Choice	Evelyn Lane	90		
Peoples Choice	Donald Pearce	71		
Peoples Choice	Mark Samuel	58		
Majority				
Turnout		4,121	38.7	▼1.3%
Registered electors		10,639		
Conservative hold		Swing		
Conservative hold		Swing		
Conservative hold		Swing		

=== Fairfield ===
Fairfield (3)
Party	Candidate	Votes	%	±%
Conservative	Robert Coatman	1,816		
Conservative	Patricia Knight	1,752		
Conservative	Audrey-Marie Yates	1,636		
Labour	Simon Hall	1,417		
Labour	Dominic O’Donnell	1,381		
Labour	Paul Dickinson	1,316		
Liberal Democrats	Robert Beadle	486		
Liberal Democrats	Joanna Whitehouse	473		
Monster Raving Loony	John Cartwright	209		
Majority				
Turnout				
Conservative hold		Swing		
Conservative hold		Swing		
Conservative hold		Swing		

=== Fieldway ===
Fieldway (2)
Party	Candidate	Votes	%	±%
Labour Co-op	James Walker	1,007		
Labour Co-op	Mary Walker	934		
Conservative	George Cowling	529		
Conservative	Joy Hamblett	497		
Majority				
Turnout				
Labour Co-op hold		Swing		
Labour Co-op hold		Swing		

=== Heathfield ===
Heathfield (3)
Party	Candidate	Votes	%	±%
Conservative	Andrew Pelling	2,445		
Conservative	Margaret Mead	2,411		
Conservative	Enley Taylor	2,192		
Labour	Andrew Bradstock	986		
Labour	Moira O’Donnell	956		
Labour	Mohammad Aslam	843		
UKIP	Alan Harker	288		
Majority				
Turnout				
Conservative hold		Swing		
Conservative hold		Swing		
Conservative hold		Swing		

=== Kenley ===
Kenley (3)
Party	Candidate	Votes	%	±%
Conservative	Janice Buttinger	2,274		
Conservative	Steven Hollands	2,196		
Conservative	Stephen O’Connell	2,185		
Liberal Democrats	Angela Catto	647		
Liberal Democrats	Jeremy Hargreaves	579		
Liberal Democrats	Susan Gauge	543		
Labour	Barry Buttigieg	528		
Labour	Zenia Jamison	480		
Labour	Sherwan Chowdhury	479		
Majority				
Turnout				
Conservative hold		Swing		
Conservative hold		Swing		
Conservative hold		Swing		

=== New Addington ===
New Addington (2)
Party	Candidate	Votes	%	±%
Labour	Brenda Kirby	1,040		
Labour	Christopher Ward	928		
Conservative	Peter Kirby	815		
Conservative	Kathryn Stewart	796		
Liberal Democrats	Robin Sullivan	136		
Liberal Democrats	Susannah Sullivan	125		
Majority				
Turnout				
Labour hold		Swing		
Labour hold		Swing		

=== Norbury ===
Norbury (3)
Party	Candidate	Votes	%	±%
Labour	Margaret Mansell	2,254		
Labour	Shafi Khan	2,227		
Labour	Peter Hopson	2,147		
Conservative	Susan Bennett	2,014		
Conservative	Gloria Hutchens	2,004		
Conservative	Rukhsana Sheikh	1,885		
Independent	Frederick Sherlock	652		
Majority				
Turnout				
Labour hold		Swing		
Labour hold		Swing		
Labour hold		Swing		

=== Purley ===
Purley (3)
Party	Candidate	Votes	%	±%
Conservative	Graham Bass	2,099		
Conservative	Derek Millard	2,056		
Conservative	Donald Speakman	1,985		
Labour	Beata Brooks	696		
Labour	Suren Pandita-Gunawardena	658		
Liberal Democrats	Gordon Burnett	654		
Labour	Barry Paterson	642		
Liberal Democrats	Pamela Randall	604		
Liberal Democrats	Mervyn Gatland	566		
Majority				
Turnout				
Conservative hold		Swing		
Conservative hold		Swing		
Conservative hold		Swing		

=== Sanderstead ===
Sanderstead (3)
Party	Candidate	Votes	%	±%
Conservative	Lynne C. Hale	2,797		
Conservative	Eric Shaw	2,740		
Conservative	Timothy Pollard	2,678		
Labour	Richard Young	537		
Liberal Democrats	Michael Bishopp	531		
Labour	Elizabeth Wolf	517		
Labour	Robert Brooks	511		
Liberal Democrats	Michael Frith	491		
Liberal Democrats	Geoffrey Gauge	470		
Majority				
Turnout				
Conservative hold		Swing		
Conservative hold		Swing		
Conservative hold		Swing		

=== Selhurst ===
Selhurst (3)
Party	Candidate	Votes	%	±%
Labour	Toni Letts	1,685		
Labour	Nuala O’Neill	1,641		
Labour	Michael Ryan	1,535		
Conservative	Barbara Drake	597		
Conservative	Jane Parker	558		
Conservative	Helen Pollard	540		
Liberal Democrats	Mark Green	367		
Liberal Democrats	Pamela Hutcheson	335		
Liberal Democrats	Lynn Roulstone	332		
Majority				
Turnout				
Labour hold		Swing		
Labour hold		Swing		
Labour hold		Swing		

=== Selsdon & Ballards ===
Selsdon & Ballards (3)
Party	Candidate	Votes	%	±%
Conservative	Dudley Mead	2,692		
Conservative	Philip Thomas	2,602		
Conservative	Julian Storey	2,562		
Labour	Ashton Anderson	619		
Liberal Democrats	John Jefkins	616		
Labour	John Simkins	611		
Liberal Democrats	Margaret Burnett	561		
Labour	Rae Goonetilleke	552		
Majority				
Turnout				
Conservative hold		Swing		
Conservative hold		Swing		
Conservative hold		Swing		

=== Shirley ===
Shirley (3)
Party	Candidate	Votes	%	±%
Conservative	Janet Marshall	2,372		
Conservative	Michael Fisher	2,040		
Conservative	Richard Chatterjee	1,978		
Labour	Sarah Jones	1,343		
Labour	Richard Plackett	1,205		
Labour	David Davies	1,135		
Liberal Democrats	Patricia West	448		
Liberal Democrats	Ejnar Sorensen	413		
Liberal Democrats	Paul West	407		
Majority				
Turnout				
Conservative hold		Swing		
Conservative hold		Swing		
Conservative hold		Swing		

=== South Norwood ===
South Norwood (3)
Party	Candidate	Votes	%	±%
Labour	Jane Avis	1,574		
Labour	Michael Jewitt	1,471		
Labour	Andrew Bagnall	1,392		
Conservative	Pauline Miles	1,011		
Conservative	Helena Kowalska	991		
Conservative	John Tooze	787		
Liberal Democrats	Julie Hardy-McBride	469		
Liberal Democrats	Graham Axford	450		
Liberal Democrats	Jan Perry	442		
Green	Brian Fewster	278		
UKIP	Ronald Newman	127		
UKIP	Alan Smith	104		
UKIP	Claire Smith	95		
Majority				
Turnout				
Labour hold		Swing		
Labour hold		Swing		
Labour hold		Swing		

=== Thornton Heath ===
Thornton Heath (3)
Party	Candidate	Votes	%	±%
Labour	Patricia Clouder	1,794		
Labour	Adrian Dennis	1,759		
Labour	Louisa Woodley	1,648		
Conservative	Malcolm Felberg	757		
Conservative	Andrew Price	691		
Conservative	David Young	662		
Liberal Democrats	Beryl Pocock	376		
Liberal Democrats	Elaine Fillingham	373		
Liberal Democrats	Christopher Pocock	334		
Independent	Ronald Dalton	234		
Independent	Shabir Ismail	173		
Majority				
Turnout				
Labour hold		Swing		
Labour hold		Swing		
Labour hold		Swing		

=== Upper Norwood ===
Upper Norwood (3)
Party	Candidate	Votes	%	±%
Labour	Patrick Ryan	1,998		
Labour	Hugh Malyan	1,961		
Labour	Ian Payne	1,828		
Conservative	Luke Clancy	1,246		
Conservative	Quentin Hawkins	1,173		
Conservative	Tirena Gunter	1,164		
Liberal Democrats	Geoffrey Morley	432		
Liberal Democrats	John Cornell	400		
People's Choice	John Gladden	229		
Majority				
Turnout				
Labour hold		Swing		
Labour hold		Swing		
Labour hold		Swing		

=== Waddon ===
Waddon (3)
Party	Candidate	Votes	%	±%
Labour	Alison Butler	1,609		
Labour	Charlotte McAree	1,585		
Labour	Paul Smith	1,532		
Conservative	Jonathan Driver	1524		
Conservative	Rex Calvert	1522		
Conservative	Philip Gamble	1475		
Liberal Democrats	Joan Leck	413		
Liberal Democrats	Suzanne Roquette	401		
Liberal Democrats	Patricia Gauge	394		
Majority				
Turnout				
Registered electors				
Labour gain from Conservative		Swing		
Labour gain from Conservative		Swing		
Labour hold		Swing		

=== West Thornton ===
West Thornton (3)
Party	Candidate	Votes	%	±%
Labour	Raj Chandarana	1,691		
Labour	Bernadette Khan	1,547		
Labour	Martin Tiedemann	1,506		
Conservative	George Fibley	704		
Conservative	Parshotam Bhagat	675		
Conservative	Christopher Leese	586		
Liberal Democrats	Saeed Malik	313		
Liberal Democrats	Christopher Reilly	306		
Liberal Democrats	Susan Watson	296		
Majority				
Turnout				
Labour hold		Swing		
Labour hold		Swing		
Labour hold		Swing		

=== Woodside ===
Woodside (3)
Party	Candidate	Votes	%	±%
Labour	Karen Jewitt	1,824		
Labour	Anthony Newman	1,774		
Labour	Paul Scott	1,623		
Conservative	Benjamin Grainger	941		
Conservative	Lindsay Frost	938		
Conservative	Joan North	891		
Independent	Brian Finegan	583		
Independent	Christina Salter	525		
Majority				
Turnout				
Registered electors				
Labour hold		Swing		
Labour hold		Swing		
Labour hold		Swing		
