= 2014 Croydon London Borough Council election =

2014 local election in England

Croydon Council Election, 2014
- 22 May 2014

All 70 seats to Croydon London Borough Council 36 seats needed for a majority

	First party	Second party
Leader	Tony Newman	Mike Fisher
Party	Labour	Conservative
Leader since	2005	2005
Leader's seat	Woodside	Shirley
Last election	33 seats, 31.3%	37 seats, 37.0%
Seats won	40	30
Seat change	▲7	▼7
Popular vote	38,277	35,734
Percentage	35.8%	33.4%
Swing	▲4.5%	▼3.6%
- Map of the results of the 2014 Croydon council election. Conservatives in blue and Labour in red.
Leader of the Council before election
Mike Fisher
Conservative
Elected Leader
Tony Newman
Labour

The 2014 Croydon Council election took place on 22 May 2014 to elect members of Croydon Council in England. This was on the same day as other local elections.

== Overall Results ==
Croydon local election result 2014
Party	Seats	Gains	Losses	Net gain/loss	Seats %	Votes %	Votes	+/−
Labour	40	7		+7	57.1	35.8	38,277	+4.5
Conservative	30		7	-7	42.9	33.4	35,734	-3.6
UKIP	0			0		14.8	15,880	+12.4
Green	0			0		8.6	9,229	+1.1
Liberal Democrats	0			0		5.7	6,062	-12.7
BNP	0			0		0.6	638	-1.3
Independent	0			0		0.4	443	-0.3
TUSC	0			0		0.3	320	N/A
Communist	0			0		0.2	201	±0.0
Putting Croydon First	0			0		0.2	191	+0.1

↓
40	30
Labour	Conservative

== Results by Ward ==
=== Addiscombe ===
Addiscombe
Party	Candidate	Votes	%	±%
Labour	Sean Fitzsimons	2,165	43.7	
Labour	Patricia Hay-Justice	2,027	40.9	
Labour	Mark Watson	1,962	39.6	
Conservative	David Harmes	1,723	34.8	
Conservative	Lisa Terry	1,653	33.4	
Conservative	Partha Chatterjee	1,630	32.9	
UKIP	Peter Staveley	659	13.3	
Green	Paul Anderson	458	9.3	
Green	Esther Sutton	439	8.9	
Green	Joseph Hague	362	7.3	
Liberal Democrats	Christopher Adams	266	5.4	
Liberal Democrats	William Tucker	186	3.8	
Liberal Democrats	Tomas Howard-Jones	169	3.4	
Majority				
Turnout		4,950	42.4	
Labour hold		Swing		
Labour hold		Swing		
Labour hold		Swing		

=== Ashburton ===
Ashburton (3)
Party	Candidate	Votes	%	±%
Labour	Madelaine Henson	2,110	40.6	
Labour	Stephen Mann	2,085	40.1	
Labour	Andrew Rendle	1,916	36.9	
Conservative	Sylvia Macdonald	1,908	36.7	
Conservative	Adam Kellett	1,848	35.5	
Conservative	Gareth Streeter	1,815	34.9	
UKIP	David Aston	788	15.2	
UKIP	Robert Ball	779	15.0	
UKIP	Robert King	705	13.6	
Green	Bernice Goldberg	328	6.3	
Liberal Democrats	Susan Adams	266	5.1	
Green	Christopher Sciberras	261	5.0	
Green	Isobel Williams	259	5.0	
Majority				
Turnout		5,199	48.3	
Labour gain from Conservative		Swing		
Labour gain from Conservative		Swing		
Labour gain from Conservative		Swing		

=== Bensham Manor ===
Bensham Manor (3)
Party	Candidate	Votes	%	±%
Labour	James Audsley	2,134	60.9	
Labour	Alison Butler	2,121	60.6	
Labour	Humayun Kabir	1,940	55.4	
Conservative	Robert Smith	588	16.8	
Conservative	Roger Taylor	579	16.5	
Conservative	Abdul Talukdar	480	13.7	
Green	Simon Jones	379	10.8	
UKIP	Dirk Muller	378	10.8	
Green	Brendan Walsh	302	8.6	
Green	Victoria Samuel	278	7.9	
Liberal Democrats	Stephen Viney	117	3.3	
Communist	Ben Stevenson	55	1.6	
Majority				
Turnout		3,502	31.5	
Labour hold		Swing		
Labour hold		Swing		
Labour hold		Swing		

=== Broad Green ===
Broad Green (3)
Party	Candidate	Votes	%	±%
Labour	Stuart Collins	2,754	63.8	
Labour	Mike Selva	2,609	60.4	
Labour	Manju Shahul-Hameed	2,289	53.0	
Conservative	Fabion Emmanuel	761	17.6	
Conservative	Andrew Stevensen	579	13.4	
Conservative	Sophia Khan	535	12.4	
UKIP	Peter Kirby	500	11.6	
UKIP	Herman Lyken	404	9.4	
Green	Nicholas Barnett	395	9.2	
Green	Bimal Mohanan	301	7.0	
Green	Pravina Ellis	265	6.1	
Liberal Democrats	Syed Mohiuddin	170	3.9	
TUSC	Paul McMillan	69	1.6	
Communist	Peter Latham	69	1.6	
TUSC	Ragesh Khakhira	65	1.5	
Majority				
Turnout		4,316	35.0	
Labour hold		Swing		
Labour hold		Swing		
Labour hold		Swing		

=== Coulsdon East ===
Coulsdon East (3)
Party	Candidate	Votes	%	±%
Conservative	Christopher Wright	2,294	52.5	
Conservative	Margaret Bird	2,230	51.0	
Conservative	James Thompson	1,864	42.6	
UKIP	Alan Smith	964	22.0	
Liberal Democrats	Ghislaine Hickson	696	15.9	
Liberal Democrats	Arfan Bhatti	649	14.8	
Liberal Democrats	Ashley Burridge	574	13.1	
Labour	Lee Findell	527	12.1	
Labour	Helen Lovesey	475	10.9	
Labour	Joanne Milligan	430	9.8	
Green	Ernest Bullimore	356	8.1	
Green	Helena Farndon	355	8.1	
Green	Jennifer Ginn	314	7.2	
Majority				
Turnout		4,373	45.6	
Conservative hold		Swing		
Conservative hold		Swing		
Conservative hold		Swing		

=== Coulsdon West ===
Coulsdon West (3)
Party	Candidate	Votes	%	±%
Conservative	Luke Clancy	2,039	51.2	
Conservative	Jeet Bains	2,032	51.0	
Conservative	Mario Creatura	1,811	45.4	
UKIP	Danny Fullilove	896	22.5	
Labour	Stephen Black	802	20.1	
Labour	Charles King	776	19.5	
Labour	Catriona Ogilvy	609	15.3	
Green	Susan Parsons	477	12.0	
Liberal Democrats	Frances Conn	311	7.8	
Liberal Democrats	Judith Earl	272	6.8	
Green	Ruud Skipper	240	6.0	
Liberal Democrats	Kenneth George	224	5.6	
Green	Timothy Watson	220	5.5	
Majority				
Turnout		3,985	38.6	
Conservative hold		Swing		
Conservative hold		Swing		
Conservative hold		Swing		

=== Croham ===
Croham
Party	Candidate	Votes	%	±%
Conservative	Maria Gatland	2,042	44.0	
Conservative	Michael Neal	1,910	41.2	
Conservative	Jason Perry	1,803	38.9	
Labour	Christopher Clark	1,100	23.7	
Labour	Paul Waddell	1,099	23.7	
Labour	Claudine Reid	1,011	21.8	
UKIP	Kathleen Garner	629	13.6	
Liberal Democrats	Michael Bishopp	587	12.7	
Green	Tracey Hague	515	11.1	
Liberal Democrats	Ben Devlin	505	10.9	
Liberal Democrats	John Jefkins	500	10.8	
Green	Gordon Halliday	479	10.3	
Green	Sasha Khan	474	10.2	
Putting Croydon First	Mark Samuel	191	4.1	
Independent	Tony Martin	97	2.1	
Turnout		4,639	41.1	
Registered electors		11,318		
Conservative hold		Swing		
Conservative hold		Swing		
Conservative hold		Swing		

=== Fairfield ===
Fairfield (3)
Party	Candidate	Votes	%	±%
Conservative	Vidhi Mohan	2,109	44.9	
Conservative	Sue Winborn	2,016	43.0	
Conservative	Helen Pollard	1,997	42.6	
Labour	Patricia Cummings	1,471	31.3	
Labour	Clive Fraser	1,408	30.0	
Labour	David Wood	1,363	29.0	
UKIP	Daniel Heaton	535	11.4	
Green	Timothy Eveleigh	504	10.7	
Green	Saima Raza	461	9.8	
Green	Jonathan Wharton	397	8.5	
Liberal Democrats	Stephanie Offer	282	6.0	
Liberal Democrats	Sasha Konechni	273	5.8	
Liberal Democrats	Ejnar Sorensen	197	4.2	
Majority				
Turnout		4,693	38.5	
Conservative hold		Swing		
Conservative hold		Swing		
Conservative hold		Swing		

=== Fieldway ===
Fieldway (2)
Party	Candidate	Votes	%	±%
Labour	Carole Bonner	1,132	48.3	
Labour	Simon Hall	1,104	47.1	
UKIP	William Eastoe	686	29.3	
Conservative	Michael Castle	471	20.1	
Conservative	Jayne Laville	314	13.4	
BNP	John Clarke	212	9.0	
BNP	David Clarke	210	9.0	
Green	Jack Groves	130	5.5	
Green	Eileen Gale	102	4.4	
Majority				
Turnout		2,344	33.0	
Labour hold		Swing		
Labour hold		Swing		

=== Heathfield ===
Heathfield (3)
Party	Candidate	Votes	%	±%
Conservative	Margaret Mead	2,048	48.1	
Conservative	Jason Cummings	2,026	47.5	
Conservative	Andy Stranack	1,778	41.7	
UKIP	Crispin Hardy	1,185	27.8	
Labour	Peter Spaulding	1,154	27.1	
Labour	Angela Collins	936	22.0	
Labour	Robert Elliott	795	18.7	
Green	Yasmin Halai-Carter	344	8.1	
Green	Christopher Warner	334	7.8	
Liberal Democrats	Andrew Bennett	296	6.9	
BNP	Michael Collard	258	6.1	
Green	Christopher Whitrow	224	5.3	
Majority				
Turnout		4,262	42.0	
Conservative hold		Swing		
Conservative hold		Swing		
Conservative hold		Swing		

=== Kenley ===
Kenley (3)
Party	Candidate	Votes	%	±%
Conservative	Janice Buttinger	2,271	52.8	
Conservative	Steven Hollands	2,123	49.3	
Conservative	Steve O'Connell	2,111	49.0	
UKIP	David Hooper	803	18.7	
UKIP	Lynnda Robson	728	16.9	
UKIP	Paul Manton	714	16.6	
Labour	Sarah Ward	451	10.5	
Labour	Christopher Williams	388	9.0	
Labour	Mary-Romoline Croos	356	8.3	
Green	Shorai Dixon-King	336	7.8	
Liberal Democrats	Angela Catto	271	6.3	
Green	Tom Voute	265	6.2	
Liberal Democrats	Olive Abdey	238	5.5	
Liberal Democrats	James Knight	217	5.0	
Majority				
Turnout		4,305	39.5	
Conservative hold		Swing		
Conservative hold		Swing		
Conservative hold		Swing		

=== New Addington ===
New Addington (2)
Party	Candidate	Votes	%	±%
Labour	Oliver Lewis	1,224	42.2	
Labour	Louisa Woodley	1,094	37.7	
UKIP	Clive Christenson	740	25.5	
Conservative	Anthony Pearson	650	22.4	
UKIP	Christopher Johnson	639	22.0	
Conservative	Lara Fish	617	21.3	
BNP	Cliff Le May	178	6.1	
Green	Andrew Cousins	123	4.2	
BNP	Donna Treanor	107	3.7	
Green	Paul Cloughton	106	3.7	
Majority				
Turnout		2,901	39.0	
Labour hold		Swing		
Labour gain from Conservative		Swing		

=== Norbury ===
Norbury (3)
Party	Candidate	Votes	%	±%
Labour	Maggie Mansell	2,227	53.8	
Labour	Sherwan Chowdhury	2,221	53.6	
Labour	Shafi Khan	2,134	51.5	
Conservative	Tirena Gunter	1,045	25.2	
Conservative	Gurmit Singh	982	23.7	
Conservative	Ben Flook	945	22.8	
UKIP	Rachel Hunte	422	10.2	
UKIP	Przemek Skwirczynski	356	8.6	
Green	Douglas Arrowsmith	321	7.8	
Green	Raj Mehta	312	7.5	
Green	Marie Norfield	305	7.4	
Liberal Democrats	Anne Viney	220	5.3	
Independent	Winston Kennedy	47	1.1	
Majority				
Turnout		4,140	35.5	
Labour hold		Swing		
Labour hold		Swing		
Labour hold		Swing		

=== Purley ===
Purley (3)
Party	Candidate	Votes	%	±%
Conservative	Simon Brew	2,248	53.1	
Conservative	Donald Speakman	1,989	47.0	
Conservative	Badsha Quadir	1,878	44.4	
Labour	Paola Bagnall	879	20.8	
Labour	Peter Horah	842	19.9	
Labour	Simbiat Longe	684	16.2	
UKIP	Laura Stringer	556	13.1	
UKIP	Georgina Guillem	552	13.0	
Green	Elizabeth Marsden	443	10.5	
Green	Simon Desorgher	409	9.7	
Green	Marion Warner	339	8.0	
Liberal Democrats	Jill George	312	7.4	
Liberal Democrats	Anthony Tucker	295	7.0	
Liberal Democrats	Neil Makwana	241	5.7	
Majority				
Turnout		4,234	38.9	
Conservative hold		Swing		
Conservative hold		Swing		
Conservative hold		Swing		

=== Sanderstead ===
Sanderstead (3)
Party	Candidate	Votes	%	±%
Conservative	Lynne Hale	2,691	61.2	
Conservative	Yvette Hopley	2,545	57.9	
Conservative	Tim Pollard	2,463	56.0	
UKIP	Claire Smith	891	20.3	
Labour	Mathew Hill	570	13.0	
Labour	Thomas Lovesey	540	12.3	
Labour	Stella Nabukeera	491	11.2	
Green	Diane Bindman	422	9.6	
Green	Stephen Harris	316	7.2	
Green	Marc Richards	295	6.7	
Liberal Democrats	Thomas Hesmondhalgh	266	6.1	
Liberal Democrats	Elizabeth Moran	242	5.5	
Liberal Democrats	Toby Keynes	208	4.7	
Majority				
Turnout		4,396	44.8	
Conservative hold		Swing		
Conservative hold		Swing		
Conservative hold		Swing		

=== Selhurst ===
Selhurst (3)
Party	Candidate	Votes	%	±%
Labour	Timothy Godfrey	2,086	57.0	
Labour	Toni Letts	2,079	56.8	
Labour	Gerry Ryan	1,996	54.5	
Conservative	Madeleine Brundle	546	14.9	
Conservative	Richard Brundle	515	14.1	
UKIP	Marianne Bowness	504	13.8	
Conservative	Dominic Schofield	471	12.9	
UKIP	Jenefer Parke-Blair	396	10.8	
Green	Meike Benzler	341	9.3	
Green	Joanne Wittams	269	7.3	
Green	Megan Braid-Pittordou	267	7.3	
Liberal Democrats	Joanne Corbin	240	6.6	
Independent	Edward Wentworth-Shaw	128	3.5	
TUSC	Elenor Haven	88	2.4	
Communist	John Eden	77	2.1	
Majority				
Turnout		3,660	30.9	
Labour hold		Swing		
Labour hold		Swing		
Labour hold		Swing		

=== Selsdon & Ballards ===
Selsdon & Ballards (3)
Party	Candidate	Votes	%	±%
Conservative	Sara Bashford	2,671	60.4	
Conservative	Dudley Mead	2,473	56.0	
Conservative	Phil Thomas	2,380	53.9	
UKIP	William Bailey	1,051	23.8	
Labour	Maggie Conway	541	12.2	
Labour	Vidyadharan Chandrababu	491	11.1	
Labour	Michael Smith	490	11.1	
Green	Amanda Larby	379	8.6	
Green	Peter Underwood	365	8.3	
Green	Casparus Nell	327	7.4	
Liberal Democrats	Edward Glynn	249	5.6	
Liberal Democrats	Anne Howard	204	4.6	
Liberal Democrats	Frederique Laporte	163	3.7	
Majority				
Turnout		4,419	46.7	
Conservative hold		Swing		
Conservative hold		Swing		
Conservative hold		Swing		

=== Shirley ===
Shirley (3)
Party	Candidate	Votes	%	±%
Conservative	Susan Bennett	2,028	42.6	
Conservative	Richard Chatterjee	2,009	42.3	
Conservative	Mike Fisher	1,972	41.5	
Labour	Marzia Nicodemi-Ehikioya	1,301	27.4	
Labour	James Gill	1,243	26.1	
Labour	Mohamed Otmani	1,163	24.5	
UKIP	Andrew Bearchell	948	19.9	
UKIP	Eamon Connolly	870	18.3	
Green	Margaret Bebington	523	11.0	
Green	Andrew Bebington	470	9.9	
Liberal Democrats	Ronald Harris	294	6.2	
Green	Elaine Garrod	252	5.3	
Majority				
Turnout		4,755	44.1	
Conservative hold		Swing		
Conservative hold		Swing		
Conservative hold		Swing		

=== South Norwood ===
South Norwood (3)
Party	Candidate	Votes	%	±%
Labour	Kathy Bee	2,303	53.8	
Labour	Jane Avis	2,211	51.6	
Labour	Wayne Lawlor	1,971	46.0	
Conservative	Jonathan Cope	1,009	23.6	
Conservative	Matthew O'Flynn	739	17.3	
Conservative	Rosina Mat St. James	731	17.1	
Green	Graham Jones	494	11.5	
Green	Andrew Ellis	486	11.3	
UKIP	Winston McKenzie	480	11.2	
UKIP	Anette Reid	437	10.2	
UKIP	Barry Slayford	437	10.2	
Green	James Seyforth	359	8.4	
Liberal Democrats	Robert Brown	314	7.3	
Liberal Democrats	Kimberley Reid	220	5.1	
Liberal Democrats	Jonathan Regan	177	4.1	
Majority				
Turnout		4,284	36.5	
Labour hold		Swing		
Labour hold		Swing		
Labour hold		Swing		

=== Thornton Heath ===
Thornton Heath (3)
Party	Candidate	Votes	%	±%
Labour Co-op	Pat Clouder	2,340	64.1	
Labour Co-op	Matthew Kyeremeh	2,040	55.9	
Labour Co-op	Karen Jewitt	2,023	55.5	
Conservative	Nicholas Bailey	545	14.9	
Conservative	Luke Springthorpe	445	12.2	
Conservative	David Osland	444	12.2	
UKIP	Emmanuel Ehrim	392	10.7	
UKIP	Anne-Michelle Gardner	388	10.6	
Green	Christine Wade	336	9.2	
Green	Rachel Kenny-Green	308	8.4	
Green	Stefan Szczelkun	295	8.1	
Independent	Dwain Coward	171	4.7	
Liberal Democrats	Maria Menezes	162	4.4	
Liberal Democrats	Geoffrey Morley	134	3.7	
TUSC	Glen Hart	92	2.5	
Majority				
Turnout		3,648	32.9	
Labour Co-op hold		Swing		
Labour Co-op hold		Swing		
Labour Co-op hold		Swing		

=== Upper Norwood ===
Upper Norwood (3)
Party	Candidate	Votes	%	±%
Labour	Pat Ryan	2,187	53.5	
Labour	Alisa Flemming	2,007	49.1	
Labour	John Wentworth	1,809	44.3	
Conservative	Katalin Jonas	785	19.2	
Conservative	Audrey Terrey	755	18.5	
Conservative	Desmond Wright	629	15.4	
Green	Leslie Kenny-Green	477	11.7	
UKIP	Martyn Jeffrey	450	11.0	
Green	Simon Holland	449	11.0	
UKIP	Anthony Ward	415	10.2	
UKIP	Sandra Ward	391	9.6	
Green	Michael Eardley	384	9.4	
Liberal Democrats	David Boyle	256	6.3	
Liberal Democrats	Suzanne Roquette	154	3.8	
Liberal Democrats	Luke Morris	145	3.5	
Majority				
Turnout		4,085	35.5	
Labour hold		Swing		
Labour hold		Swing		
Labour hold		Swing		

=== Waddon ===
Waddon (3)
Party	Candidate	Votes	%	±%
Labour	Robert Canning	1,965	40.3	
Labour	Andrew Pelling	1,937	39.8	
Labour	Joy Prince	1,924	39.5	
Conservative	Tony Harris	1,803	37.0	
Conservative	Simon Hoar	1,696	34.8	
Conservative	Mark Johnson	1,565	32.1	
UKIP	Jonathan Bailey	585	12.0	
UKIP	Kevin Adamson	575	11.8	
UKIP	Graham Rix	537	13.1	
Green	Mary Davey	324	6.7	
Green	Paula Onions	293	6.0	
Liberal Democrats	Kirsty Armstrong	197	4.0	
Green	Martyn Post	190	3.9	
Liberal Democrats	Michael Tavares	151	3.1	
TUSC	Anindya Bhattacharya	71	1.5	
Turnout		4,870	41.1	
Labour gain from Conservative		Swing		
Labour gain from Conservative		Swing		
Labour gain from Conservative		Swing		

=== West Thornton ===
West Thornton (3)
Party	Candidate	Votes	%	±%
Labour	Emily Benn	2,461	63.3	
Labour	Bernadette Khan	2,371	61.0	
Labour	Stuart King	2,243	57.7	
Conservative	Florence Evans	684	17.6	
Conservative	Samir Dwesar	650	16.7	
Conservative	Patrick Ratnaraja	595	15.3	
Green	David Beall	331	8.5	
UKIP	William Thomas	312	8.0	
UKIP	Marjorie Bissick	298	7.7	
Green	Barry Buttigieg	213	5.5	
Green	Rebecca Parnell	207	5.3	
Liberal Democrats	Patricia Knight	134	3.4	
Majority				
Turnout		3,889	33.7	
Labour hold		Swing		
Labour hold		Swing		
Labour hold		Swing		

=== Woodside ===
Woodside (3)
Party	Candidate	Votes	%	±%
Labour	Tony Newman	2,130	55.3	
Labour	Paul Scott	2,000	51.9	
Labour	Hamida Ali	1,874	48.6	
Conservative	Michael Sidwell	874	22.7	
Conservative	Amy Pollard	831	21.6	
Conservative	Mustafa Tary	714	18.5	
UKIP	Ace Nnorom	522	13.5	
Green	Andrew Enebe	493	12.8	
Green	Clare Trivedi	426	11.1	
Green	Harris Bokhari	395	10.2	
Liberal Democrats	Heather Jefkins	206	5.3	
Majority				
Turnout		3,855	34.3	
Labour hold		Swing		
Labour hold		Swing		
Labour hold		Swing		

== Elected members ==
Ward	Members elected in 2014
Addiscombe	Sean Fitzsimons (Lab)
Addiscombe	Patricia Hay-Justice (Lab)
Addiscombe	Mark Watson (Lab)
Ashburton	Maddie Henson (Lab)
Ashburton	Stephen Mann (Lab)
Ashburton	Andrew Rendle (Lab)
Bensham Manor	Jamie Audsley (Lab)
Bensham Manor	Alison Butler (Lab)
Bensham Manor	Humayun Kabir (Lab)
Broad Green	Stuart Collins (Lab)
Broad Green	Mike Selva (Lab)
Broad Green	Manju Shahul-Hameed (Lab)
Coulsdon East	Christopher Wright (Con)
Coulsdon East	Margaret Bird (Con)
Coulsdon East	James Thompson (Con)
Coulsdon West	Luke Clancy (Con)
Coulsdon West	Jeet Bains (Con)
Coulsdon West	Mario Creatura (Con)
Croham	Maria Gatland (Con)
Croham	Michael Neal (Con)
Croham	Jason Perry (Con)
Fairfield	Vidhi Mohan (Con)
Fairfield	Susan Winborn (Con)
Fairfield	Helen Pollard (Con)
Fieldway	Simon Hall (Lab)
Fieldway	Carole Bonner (Lab)
Heathfield	Margaret Mead (Con)
Heathfield	Jason Cummings (Con)
Heathfield	Andrew Stranack (Con)
Kenley	Jan Buttinger (Con)
Kenley	Steve O'Connell (Con)
Kenley	Steve Hollands (Con)
New Addington	Oliver Lewis (Lab)
New Addington	Louisa Woodley (Lab)
Norbury	Maggie Mansell (Lab)
Norbury	Shafi Khan (Lab)
Norbury	Sherwan Chowdhury (Lab)
Purley	Christopher Brew (Con)
Purley	Badsha Quadir (Con)
Purley	Donald Speakman (con)
Sanderstead	Lynne Hale (Con)
Sanderstead	Timothy Pollard (Con)
Sanderstead	Yvette Hopley (Con)
Selhurst	Timothy Godfrey (Lab)
Selhurst	David Wood (Lab)
Selhurst	Toni Letts (Lab)
Selsdon and Ballards	Dudley Mead (Con)
Selsdon and Ballards	Sara Bashford (Con)
Selsdon and Ballards	Phil Thomas (Con)
Shirley	Sue Bennett (Con)
Shirley	Richard Chatterjee (Con)
Shirley	Mike Fisher (Con)
South Norwood	Kathy Bee (Lab)
South Norwood	Jane Avis (Lab)
South Norwood	Wayne Lawlor (Lab)
Thornton Heath	Pat Clouder (Lab)
Thornton Heath	Karen Jewitt (Lab)
Thornton Heath	Matthew Kyeremeh (Lab)
Upper Norwood	Alisa Flemming (Lab)
Upper Norwood	Pat Ryan (Lab)
Upper Norwood	John Wentworth (Lab)
Waddon	Robert Canning (Lab)
Waddon	Andrew Pelling (Lab)
Waddon	Joy Prince (Lab)
West Thornton	Emily Benn (Lab)
West Thornton	Bernadette Khan (Lab)
West Thornton	Stuart King (Lab)
Woodside	Tony Newman (Lab)
Woodside	Paul Scott (Lab)
Woodside	Hamida Ali (Lab)
