= Jason Perry (politician) =

British politician

Mayor Jason Perry
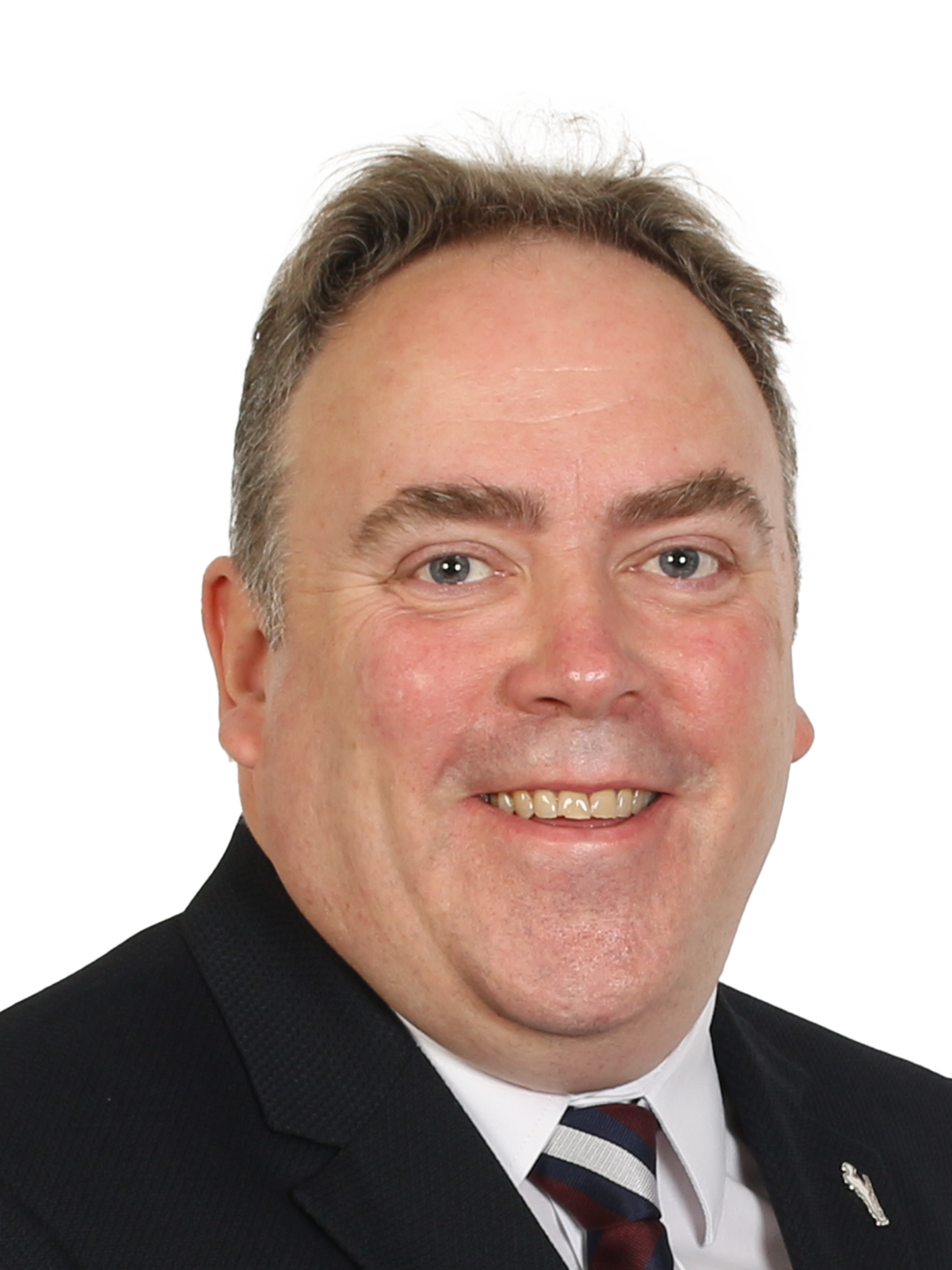
- Official portrait, 2021

Mayor of Croydon
- Incumbent
- Assumed office 9 May 2022
- Deputy: Lynne Hale
- Preceded by: Office established Hamida Ali (as Leader of the Council)
- Majority: 589

Leader of the Opposition of London Borough of Croydon Council
- In office 2 September 2020 – 9 May 2022
- Preceded by: Tim Pollard
- Succeeded by: Stuart King

Member of Croydon Council
- In office 2 May 1994 – 9 May 2022
- Preceded by: Andrew Pelling
- Succeeded by: Danielle Denton
- Constituency: Coulsdon East (1994–2002); Croham (2002–2018); South Croydon (2018–2022)

Personal details
- Born: Jason Stephen Perry Croydon, London, England
- Party: Conservative
- Children: 2
- Website: Official website

Jason Stephen Perry is a Conservative Party politician who has served as the Mayor of Croydon, a borough within London, since 2022. He was previously the leader of the opposition of the Croydon London Borough Council and has been leader of the Croydon Council Conservative Group since September 2020.

== Political career ==
Perry has been a councillor on Croydon London Borough Council since 1994, representing Coulsdon East from 1994 to 2002, Croham from 2002 to 2018, and South Croydon since boundary changes in 2018. He served as a cabinet member during the 2006–2014 Conservative administration and served as a deputy leader of the Croydon Council Conservative Group from 2017 to 2020. In October 2021 he was selected as Croydon Conservatives' candidate for the newly created position of Mayor of Croydon. He was elected on 5 May 2022, defeating the Labour candidate, former deputy mayor of London Val Shawcross, with 50.4% of the vote after the second round. He was re-elected in 2026 with 30.5% of the vote, beating the second-place candidate, Rowenna Davis, by 1,113 votes.

== Electoral history ==
=== 2026 election ===
Mayor of Croydon Election 2026)
Party	Candidate	Votes	%	±%
Conservative	Jason Perry*	35,871	30.5	−4.3
Labour	Rowenna Davis	34758	29.6	−3.1
Green	Peter Underwood	19404	16.5	+10.0
Reform	Ben Flook	14467	12.3	n/a
Liberal Democrats	Richard Howard	7815	6.6	−3.8
Taking the Initiative	Michael Pusey MBE	2597	2.2	−3.8
Independent	Jose Joseph	1568	1.3	n/a
TUSC	Ben Goldstone	461	0.4	n/a
Turnout		117616	41	
Conservative hold		Swing		

=== 2022 election ===
Perry was elected as both Mayor and a Councillor. Therefore under the Local Government Act 2000 his Council seat was declared vacant and a by-election was held on the 30th June to elect a successor.

2022 Croydon Mayoral election
Party	Candidate	1st round		2nd round			1st round votesTransfer votes, 2nd round
Party	Candidate	Total	Of round	Transfers	Total	Of round	1st round votesTransfer votes, 2nd round
Conservative	Jason Perry	33,413	34.8%	5,199	38,612	50.4	
Labour Co-op	Val Shawcross	31,352	32.7%	6,671	38,023	49.6	
Liberal Democrats	Richard Howard	9,967	10.4%				
Independent	Andrew Pelling	6,807	7.1%				
Green	Peter Underwood	6,193	6.5%				
Taking the Initiative	Farah London	5,768	6.0%				
Independent	Winston McKenzie	1,324	1.4%				
Independent	Gavin Palmer	1,114	1.2%				
Total votes		97,458					
Registered electors		280,960					
Conservative win							

Croydon Council Election 2022: South Croydon (3)
Party	Candidate	Votes	%	±%
Conservative	Maria Gatland*	1,898		
Conservative	Jason Perry*	1,872		
Conservative	Michael Neal*	1,688		
Labour	Bridget Galloway	1,378		
Labour	Joshua Andrew	1,359		
Labour	Tariq Hafeez	1,196		
Green	Steve Harris	682		
Liberal Democrats	Martin Drake	668		
Liberal Democrats	Michael Bishopp	659		
Green	Nayan Patel	605		
Liberal Democrats	Keith Miller	529		
Green	Marc Richards	508		
UKIP	Kathleen Garner	117		
Turnout		4,788	38.41	
Conservative hold		Swing		
Conservative hold		Swing		
Conservative hold		Swing		

=== 2018 election ===
Croydon Council Election 2018: South Croydon (3)
Party	Candidate	Votes	%	±%
Conservative	Maria Gatland	2,345	18.02	
Conservative	Michael Neal	2,169	16.67	
Conservative	Jason Perry	2,108	16.20	
Labour	Stella Nabukeera	1,633	12.55	
Labour	Matthew Dimas Hill	1,606	12.34	
Labour	Paul Martin Waddell	1,575	12.11	
Green	Stephen Harris	442	3.40	
Liberal Democrats	Michael Thomas Albert Bishopp	438	3.37	
Green	Saima Raza	395	3.04	
Green	Marc Richards	339	2.61	
Liberal Democrats	Toby William Keynes	294	2.26	
Independent	Mark Robin Lionel Samuel	104	0.80	
Majority		475	3.65	
Turnout		4,719	40.08	
Registered electors		11,774		
Conservative hold		Swing		
Conservative hold		Swing		
Conservative hold		Swing		

=== 2014 election ===
Croydon Council Election 2014: Croham
Party	Candidate	Votes	%	±%
Conservative	Maria Gatland	2,042		
Conservative	Michael Neal	1,910		
Conservative	Jason Perry	1,803		
Labour	Christopher Clark	1,100		
Labour	Paul Waddell	1,099		
Labour	Claudine Reid	1,011		
UKIP	Kathleen Garner	629		
Liberal Democrats	Michael Bishopp	587		
Green	Tracey Hague	515		
Liberal Democrats	Ben Devlin	505		
Liberal Democrats	John Jefkins	500		
Green	Gordon Halliday	479		
Green	Sasha Khan	474		
Putting Croydon First	Mark Samuel	191		
Independent	Tony Martin	97		
Turnout		4,315	41.10%	▼25.94%
Registered electors		11,318		
Conservative hold		Swing		
Conservative hold		Swing		
Conservative hold		Swing		

=== 2010 election ===
Croydon Council Election 2010: Croham
Party	Candidate	Votes	%	±%
Conservative	Maria Gatland	3,389		
Conservative	Michael Neal	3,070		
Conservative	Jason Perry	2,804		
Labour	Natalie Allen	1,806		
Liberal Democrats	John Jefkins	1,795		
Liberal Democrats	Martin Camden	1,778		
Liberal Democrats	Simon Rix	1,758		
Labour	Martin Angus	1,512		
Labour	Adam Bonner	1,343		
Green	Stephen Harris	538		
Green	Muriel Passmore	507		
UKIP	William Bailey	444		
Green	Marc Richards	433		
Putting Croydon First	Mark Samuel	218		
Turnout		7,582	67.04%	▲25.64%
Registered electors		11,309		
Conservative hold		Swing		
Conservative hold		Swing		
Conservative hold		Swing		

=== 2006 election ===
Croydon Council Election 2006: Croham
Party	Candidate	Votes	%	±%
Conservative	Maria Gatland	2,590		
Conservative	Michael Neal	2,418		
Conservative	Jason Perry	2,378		
Liberal Democrats	Michael Bishopp	861		
Liberal Democrats	Sheelagh Crampton	739		
Labour	Laura Doughty	722		
Labour	Paul Anderson	697		
Liberal Democrats	Edward Maxfield	609		
Green	Stephen Harris	569		
Labour	James Mburu	566		
UKIP	William Bailey	206		
The People's Choice	Evelyn Lane	113		
The People's Choice	Debra Cannam	112		
The People's Choice	Mark Samuel	96		
Turnout		4,460	41.4%	▲2.7%
Registered electors		10,785		
Conservative hold		Swing		
Conservative hold		Swing		
Conservative hold		Swing		

=== 2002 election ===
Croydon Council Election 2002: Croham (3)
Party	Candidate	Votes	%	±%
Conservative	Maria R. Gatland	2,100		
Conservative	Jason S. Perry	2,008		
Conservative	Michael A. Neal	1,984		
Liberal Democrats	Graham T. Dare	1,232		
Liberal Democrats	Sarah J. Newton	1,192		
Liberal Democrats	Gavin T. Howard-Jones	1,171		
Labour	Laura T. Doughty	681		
Labour	Stephen C. Moyse	647		
Labour	Louise F. Szpera	583		
UKIP	Brian P. Alchorn	106		
UKIP	Kathleen Garner	93		
Peoples Choice	Evelyn J. Lane	90		
Peoples Choice	Donald Pearce	71		
Peoples Choice	Mark R.L. Samuel	58		
Turnout		4,121	38.7	▼1.3%
Registered electors		10,639		
Conservative hold		Swing		
Conservative hold		Swing		
Conservative hold		Swing		

=== 1998 election ===
Croydon Council Election 1998: Coulsdon East (3)
Party	Candidate	Votes	%	±%
Conservative	Christopher Wright	2,234		
Liberal Democrats	Ian R. Atkins	2,122		
Conservative	Jason S. Perry	2,112		
Conservative	Brian A. Udell	2,106		
Liberal Democrats	Michael T.A. Bishopp	1,935		
Liberal Democrats	Mark B. Goodrich	1,867		
Labour	Maggie Conway	474		
Labour	Charles King	431		
Labour	Michael T. Ryan	410		
Majority				
Turnout				
Registered electors				
Conservative hold		Swing		
Liberal Democrats gain from Conservative		Swing		
Conservative hold		Swing		

=== 1994 election ===
Croydon Council Election 1994: Coulsdon East (3)
Party	Candidate	Votes	%	±%
Conservative	Christopher Wright	2,228		
Conservative	Christine A. Prentice	2,105		
Conservative	Jason S. Perry	2,091		
Liberal Democrats	Ian R. Atkins	1,597		
Liberal Democrats	John P. Callen	1,547		
Liberal Democrats	Keith C. Jacobs	1,408		
Labour	Margaret Conway	736		
Labour	Michael P. J. Phelan	608		
Labour	Syed M. Hassan	570		
Majority		494		
Turnout				
Registered electors				
Conservative hold		Swing		
Conservative hold		Swing		
Conservative hold		Swing		
