= Sanderstead North (ward) =

Former ward of the London Borough of Croydon, England

- Former ward for Croydon Council
- County: Greater London

1965–1978
- Number of councillors: Three
- Replaced by: Croham
- Created from: Borough Created
- UK Parliament constituency: Croydon South

Sanderstead North was a ward in the London Borough of Croydon, London in the United Kingdom, created in 1965 (although holding its first election in 1964), and abolished in 1978.

The ward was in the Croydon South constituency, one of the safest Conservative seats in London.

== List of Councillors ==
| Election | Councillor | Party | Councillor | Party | Councillor | Party |
|---|---|---|---|---|---|---|
| 1964 | Ward created | | | | | |
| 1964 | Paul W. Rickards | Conservative | William N. Peet | Conservative | F. Hargreaves | Conservative |
| 1968 | Paul W. Rickards | Conservative | William N. Peet | Conservative | Keith A. Wells | Conservative |
| 1978 | Ward abolished | | | | | |

== Sanderstead North Election Results ==
=== 1964 ===
Croydon Council Election 1964: Sanderstead North (3)
| Party | Candidate | Votes | % | ±% |
|---|---|---|---|---|
| Conservative | Paul W. Rickards | 3,635 | | |
| Conservative | William N. Peet | 3,611 | | |
| Conservative | F. Hargreaves | 3,528 | | |
| Labour | R. G. M. Jones | 811 | | |
| Labour | Mrs. L. M. B. Messer | 807 | | |
| Labour | S. N. Ings | 800 | | |
| Liberal | Mrs. N. V. Howard | 663 | | |
| Liberal | G. A. Kemp | 597 | | |
| Liberal | W. H. White | 583 | | |
| Turnout | | 5,075 | 41.8 | |
| Conservative win (new seat) | | | | |
| Conservative win (new seat) | | | | |
| Conservative win (new seat) | | | | |

=== 1968 ===
Croydon Council Election 1968: Sanderstead North (3)
| Party | Candidate | Votes | % | ±% |
|---|---|---|---|---|
| Conservative | William N. Peet | 4,293 | | |
| Conservative | Paul W. Rickards | 4,268 | | |
| Conservative | Keith A. Wells | 4,190 | | |
| Liberal | R.A. Coleman | 912 | | |
| Liberal | J.A.H. Clement | 905 | | |
| Liberal | Mrs M.J. Woods | 851 | | |
| Labour | Mrs P.M. Poole | 483 | | |
| Labour | M.T. Reardon | 426 | | |
| Labour | H. Stevens | 409 | | |
| Turnout | | | 47.4 | |
| Conservative hold | | Swing | | |
| Conservative hold | | Swing | | |
| Conservative hold | | Swing | | |

=== 1971 ===
Croydon Council Election 1971: Sanderstead North (3)
| Party | Candidate | Votes | % | ±% |
|---|---|---|---|---|
| Conservative | Paul W. Rickards | 3,809 | | |
| Conservative | Keith A. Wells | 3,748 | | |
| Conservative | William N. Peet | 3,734 | | |
| Labour | Mrs P.M. Poole | 1,113 | | |
| Labour | J.W. Gleisner | 1,054 | | |
| Labour | G.C. Daisley | 1,051 | | |
| Liberal | R.A. Coleman | 433 | | |
| Liberal | J.A.H. Clement | 404 | | |
| Liberal | Mrs M.J. Woods | 403 | | |
| Turnout | | | 41.1 | |
| Conservative hold | | Swing | | |
| Conservative hold | | Swing | | |
| Conservative hold | | Swing | | |

=== 1974 ===
Croydon Council Election 1974: Sanderstead North (3)
| Party | Candidate | Votes | % | ±% |
|---|---|---|---|---|
| Conservative | Paul W. Rickards | 3,773 | | |
| Conservative | Keith A. Wells | 3,707 | | |
| Conservative | William N. Peet | 3,659 | | |
| Liberal | D. Nunneley | 1,150 | | |
| Liberal | Mrs G.E. Westmoreland | 1,105 | | |
| Liberal | G.S. Andrews | 1,091 | | |
| Labour | W.A. Grimes | 607 | | |
| Labour | J.C. Barlow | 603 | | |
| Labour | A.J. Woodward | 578 | | |
| Turnout | | | 43.3 | |
| Conservative hold | | Swing | | |
| Conservative hold | | Swing | | |
| Conservative hold | | Swing | | |
