= 2018 Croydon London Borough Council election =

2018 local election in England

2018 Croydon Council Election
- 3 May 2018

All 70 seats to Croydon London Borough Council 36 seats needed for a majority

	First party	Second party
Leader	Tony Newman	Tim Pollard
Party	Labour	Conservative
Leader since	2005	22 September 2014
Leader's seat	Woodside	Sanderstead
Last election	40 seats, 35.8%	30 seats, 33.4%
Seats before	39^{†}	31^{†}
Seats won	41	29
Seat change	▲2*	▼2*
Popular vote	46,266	41,569
Percentage	44.5%	40.1%
Swing	▲8.7%	▲6.7%
- Map of the results of the 2018 Croydon council election. Conservatives in blue and Labour in red.^{†}Notional 2014 results based on new electoral boundaries, as calculated by BBC News *Indicates boundary change - so this is a notional figure
Leader of the Council before election
Tony Newman
Labour
Elected Leader
Tony Newman
Labour

The 2018 Croydon Council election took place on 3 May 2018 to elect members of Croydon Council in England. This was on the same day as other London local elections.

This election was the first fought on new ward boundaries in Croydon. The total number of seats remains the same, however the number of wards has increased by four, from 24 to 28.

== Campaign ==
The campaign officially began on 27 March 2018.

The Conservative Party released their manifesto first, on 2 April, entitled "A Council that's on your side". The manifesto included policies such as planning committee reform, an immediate pause on the council's building company, Brick by Brick, and active Fly-Tip patrols.

The Labour manifesto was launched on 7 April, with many street stalls in district centres around the borough. The Labour manifesto was called "Labour's plan for Croydon". It heavily echoed the party's 2014 manifesto, 'Ambitious for Croydon', and largely reflected a continuation of existing council policies.

The Liberal Democrat manifesto was released shortly after, with campaigns that included a People’s Vote on Brexit, campaigning to stop the axing of local bus routes, the restoration of community policing and an extension of the night Overground to Crystal Palace.

== Overall results ==
Croydon Council election result 2018
Party	Seats	Gains	Losses	Net gain/loss	Seats %	Votes %	Votes	+/−
Labour	41	0	1	+2^{†}	58.6	44.5	46,266	+8.7
Conservative	29	1	0	-2^{†}	41.4	40.1	41,569	+6.7
Green	0			0		7.7	8,866	-0.9
Liberal Democrats	0			0		5.8	6,589	+0.1
UKIP	0			0		0.8	888	-14.0
Independent	0			0		0.6	590	+0.2
Others	0			0		0.1	144	-1.2

^{†}Notional changes calculated by BBC News

↓
41	29
Labour	Conservative

== Ward Results ==
An asterisk * indicates an incumbent councillor seeking re-election.

=== Addiscombe East ===
Addiscombe East (2)
Party	Candidate	Votes	%	±%
Labour	Maddie Henson*	1,903	46.5	
Conservative	Jeet Bains	1,754	42.9	
Labour	Caragh Skipper	1746	42.7	
Conservative	Joseph Lee	1709	41.8	
Green	Tim Eveleigh	273	6.7	
Liberal Democrats	Andrew Bennett	207	5.1	
Green	Bernice Goldberg	197	4.8	
Liberal Democrats	Valerie Astles	197	4.8	
Majority		8	0.10	
Turnout		4111	46.77	
Labour hold		Swing		
Conservative gain from Labour		Swing		

=== Addiscombe West ===
Addiscombe West (3)
Party	Candidate	Votes	%	±%
Labour Co-op	Sean Fitzsimons*	2,146	53.8	
Labour Co-op	Jerry Fitzpatrick	2,138	53.6	
Labour Co-op	Patricia Hay-Justice*	1,992	50.0	
Conservative	Jade Appleton	1280	32.1	
Conservative	Lindsey Blackburn	1127	28.3	
Conservative	Michael O'Dwyer	1101	27.6	
Green	Esther Sutton	494	12.4	
Green	Tracey Hague	285	7.1	
Green	Joe Hague	269	6.7	
Liberal Democrats	Rachel Howard	239	6.0	
Liberal Democrats	Sasa Konechni	215	5.4	
Liberal Democrats	Peter Ladanyi	175	4.4	
Majority		712	6.21	
Turnout		4000	38.57	
Labour hold		Swing		
Labour hold		Swing		
Labour hold		Swing		

=== Bensham Manor ===
Bensham Manor (3)
Party	Candidate	Votes	%	±%
Labour	Alison Butler	2,665	69.6	
Labour	Jamie Audsley	2,652	69.3	
Labour	Humayun Kabir	2,546	66.5	
Conservative	Alan Bowden	726	19.0	
Conservative	Kumari Anupama	568	14.8	
Conservative	Jebun Quadir	472	12.3	
Green	Varyl Thorndycraft	367	9.6	
Green	Pravina Ellis	332	8.7	
Green	Raj Mehta	311	8.1	
Majority		1,820	17.11	
Turnout				
Labour hold		Swing		
Labour hold		Swing		
Labour hold		Swing		

=== Broad Green ===
Broad Green (3)
Party	Candidate	Votes	%	±%
Labour	Stuart Collins	3,105	74.8	
Labour	Muhammad Ali	2,820	68.0	
Labour	Manju Shahul-Hameed	2,678	64.5	
Conservative	Jayde Edwards	698	16.8	
Conservative	Kofi Frimpong	693	16.7	
Conservative	Sharmmi Jeganmogan	661	15.9	
Green	Tim Watson	414	10.0	
Green	Am Weatherspoon	299	7.2	
Majority		1,980	17.42	
Turnout				
Labour hold		Swing		
Labour hold		Swing		
Labour hold		Swing		

=== Coulsdon Town ===
Coulsdon Town (3)
Party	Candidate	Votes	%	±%
Conservative	Luke Clancy*	2,320	57.3	
Conservative	Mario Creatura*	2,265	55.9	
Conservative	Ian Parker	2,264	55.9	
Labour	Stephen Black	1,047	25.9	
Labour	Charlie King	1,030	25.4	
Labour	Ellily Ponnuthurai	833	20.6	
Liberal Democrats	Josh Viggiani	437	10.8	
Green	Lucy Farndon	399	9.9	
Liberal Democrats	Adrian Glendinning	288	7.1	
Liberal Democrats	Anna Jones	285	7.0	
Green	Jay Ginn	235	5.8	
Green	Leo Hopkins	201	5.0	
Majority		1,217	10.49	
Turnout				
Conservative hold		Swing		
Conservative hold		Swing		
Conservative hold		Swing		

=== Crystal Palace and Upper Norwood ===
Crystal Palace and Upper Norwood (3)
Party	Candidate	Votes	%	±%
Labour	Pat Ryan	2,399	50.9	
Labour	Nina Degrads	2,380	50.5	
Labour	Stephen Mann	2,215	47.0	
Liberal Democrats	Claire Bonham	927	19.7	
Conservative	Gemma Patient	827	17.5	
Conservative	Andy Phillips	819	17.4	
Conservative	Dan Edwardson	813	17.2	
Liberal Democrats	Guy Burchett	754	16.0	
Green	Rachel Chance	706	15.0	
Liberal Democrats	Chris Jordan	614	13.0	
Green	Tom Chance	499	10.6	
Green	Michael O'Sullivan	456	9.7	
Independent	Andrew Rothschild	107	2.3	
Majority		1,288	9.53	
Turnout				
Labour hold		Swing		
Labour hold		Swing		
Labour hold		Swing		

=== Fairfield ===
Fairfield (3)
Party	Candidate	Votes	%	±%
Labour	Mary Croos	1,351	52.5	
Labour	Chris Clark	1,329	51.7	
Labour	Niroshan Sirisena	1,226	47.7	
Conservative	Ben Joce	792	30.8	
Conservative	Philip Smith	753	29.3	
Conservative	Elizabeth Agyepong	750	29.2	
Green	Takudzwa Chideme	267	10.4	
Green	Alex Gwilt-Cox	266	10.3	
Liberal Democrats	Thomas Forster	241	9.4	
Liberal Democrats	Alan Reynolds	209	8.1	
Majority		434	6.04	
Turnout				
Labour hold		Swing		
Labour hold		Swing		
Labour hold		Swing		

=== Kenley ===
Kenley (2)
Party	Candidate	Votes	%	±%
Conservative	Jan Buttinger*	2,025	66.2	
Conservative	Stephen O'Connell*	1,966	64.2	
Labour	Maggie Conway	613	20.0	
Labour	Appu Srinivasan	448	14.6	
Green	Kate Morris	250	8.2	
Green	Ian Dixon	232	7.6	
Liberal Democrats	Anne Howard	207	6.8	
Liberal Democrats	Arfan Bhatti	186	6.1	
Majority		1,353	22.83	
Turnout				
Conservative hold		Swing		
Conservative hold		Swing		

=== New Addington North ===
New Addington North (2)
Party	Candidate	Votes	%	±%
Labour	Simon Hall	1,209	62.9	
Labour	Felicity Flynn	1,119	58.2	
Conservative	Ace Nnorom	402	20.9	
Conservative	Phil Sheppard	360	18.7	
BNP	John Clarke	142	7.4	
UKIP	Dan Heaton	141	7.3	
Green	David Beall	120	6.2	
UKIP	Robert King	100	5.2	
Majority		717	19.96	
Turnout				
Labour hold		Swing		
Labour hold		Swing		

=== New Addington South ===
New Addington South (2)
Party	Candidate	Votes	%	±%
Labour	Oliver Lewis	1,306	49.0	
Labour	Louisa Woodley	1,156	43.4	
Conservative	Tony Pearson	984	36.9	
Conservative	Mark Johnson	949	35.6	
UKIP	Peter Staveley	172	6.5	
BNP	Dave Clarke	131	4.9	
Green	Martin Douglas	125	4.7	
UKIP	Michael Swadling	80	3.0	
Majority		172	3.51	
Turnout				
Labour hold		Swing		
Labour hold		Swing		

=== Norbury and Pollards Hill ===
Norbury and Pollards Hill (2)
Party	Candidate	Votes	%	±%
Labour	Maggie Mansell	1,981	64.6	
Labour	Shafi Khan	1,934	63.1	
Conservative	Calum Bardsley	644	21.0	
Conservative	Mike Mogul	638	20.8	
Green	Stephen Amor	299	9.8	
Green	Cheryl Zimmerman	291	9.5	
Majority		1,290	22.29	
Turnout				
Labour hold		Swing		
Labour hold		Swing		

=== Norbury Park ===
Norbury Park (2)
Party	Candidate	Votes	%	±%
Labour	Sherwan Chowdhury	1,730	54.1	
Labour	Alisa Flemming	1,697	53.1	
Conservative	Blake O'Donnell	1,039	32.5	
Conservative	Olaluwa Kolade	976	30.5	
Green	Rebecca Weighell	249	7.8	
Green	Graham Jones	199	6.2	
Liberal Democrats	Anne Viney	159	5.0	
Liberal Democrats	Stephen Viney	121	3.8	
Majority		658	10.66	
Turnout				
Labour hold		Swing		
Labour hold		Swing		

=== Old Coulsdon ===
Old Coulsdon (2)
Party	Candidate	Votes	%	±%
Conservative	Margaret Bird	2,099	61.2	
Conservative	Steven Hollands	1,779	51.9	
Liberal Democrats	Gill Hickson	838	24.4	
Liberal Democrats	Richard Howard	572	16.7	
Labour	Alan Donovan	485	14.1	
Labour	Ann Creighton	431	12.6	
Green	Alison Gillett	129	3.8	
UKIP	Hoong-Wai Cheah	129	3.8	
Green	Jonathan Moles	108	3.1	
Majority		941	14.32	
Turnout				
Conservative hold		Swing		
Conservative hold		Swing		

=== Park Hill and Whitgift ===
Park Hill and Whitgift (1)
Party	Candidate	Votes	%	±%
Conservative	Vidhhyacharan Mohan	1,110	55.86	
Labour	Ranil Perera	618	31.10	
Green	James Cork	126	6.34	
Liberal Democrats	Robert Williams	133	6.69	
Majority		492	24.76	
Turnout		1991		
Conservative hold		Swing		

=== Purley and Woodcote ===
Purley and Woodcote (3)
Party	Candidate	Votes	%	±%
Conservative	Simon Brew*	3,028	65.1	
Conservative	Oni Oviri	2,727	58.6	
Conservative	Badsha Quadir	2,663	57.3	
Labour	Jason Arday	953	20.5	
Labour	Mark Justice	931	20.0	
Labour	Catherine Wilson	809	17.4	
Independent	Donald Speakman*	379	8.1	
Liberal Democrats	James Arneill	377	8.1	
Liberal Democrats	Frances Conn	376	8.1	
Green	Wendy Harding	347	7.5	
Liberal Democrats	Andy Sparkes	314	6.8	
Green	Simon Hargrave	296	6.4	
Green	Martyn Post	159	3.4	
Majority		1,710	12.8	
Turnout				
Conservative hold		Swing		
Conservative hold		Swing		
Conservative hold		Swing		

=== Purley Oaks and Riddlesdown ===
Purley Oaks and Riddlesdown (2)
Party	Candidate	Votes	%	±%
Conservative	Simon Hoar	2,010	60.9	
Conservative	Helen Redfern	1,927	58.4	
Labour	Gill Millman	804	24.4	
Labour	Khizar Sahi	725	22.0	
Liberal Democrats	Julian Rees	241	7.3	
Green	Simon Desorgher	230	7.0	
Liberal Democrats	Thomas Hesmondhalgh	227	6.9	
Green	Colette Ramuz	214	6.5	
Majority		1,123	17.61	
Turnout				
Conservative hold		Swing		
Conservative hold		Swing		

=== Sanderstead ===
Sanderstead (3)
Party	Candidate	Votes	%	±%
Conservative	Lynne Hale	3,971	70.5	
Conservative	Yvette Hopley	3,954	70.2	
Conservative	Timothy Pollard	3,844	68.3	
Labour	Paul Ainscough	908	16.1	
Labour	Lynda Graham	904	16.1	
Labour	Joshua Andrew	853	15.2	
Liberal Democrats	John Jefkins	498	8.8	
Liberal Democrats	Annie Jordan	462	8.2	
Liberal Democrats	Keith Miller	357	6.3	
Green	Matt Bullock	334	5.9	
Green	Hanna Short	285	5.1	
Majority		2,936	17.94	
Turnout				
Conservative hold		Swing		
Conservative hold		Swing		
Conservative hold		Swing		

=== Selhurst ===
Selhurst (2)
Party	Candidate	Votes	%	±%
Labour	Toni Letts	1,606	69.7	
Labour	David Wood	1,570	68.1	
Conservative	Sas Conradie	399	17.3	
Conservative	Sophie Hoar	347	15.1	
Green	Catherine Graham	266	11.5	
Green	Matthew Lucas	189	8.2	
Majority		1,171	26.75	
Turnout				
Labour hold		Swing		
Labour hold		Swing		

=== Selsdon and Addington Village ===
Selsdon and Addington Village (2)
Party	Candidate	Votes	%	±%
Conservative	Helen Pollard	2,095	60.6	
Conservative	Rob Ward	1,901	55.0	
Labour	Joyce Reid	917	26.5	
Labour	Kenneth Towl	704	20.4	
Green	Peter Underwood	278	8.0	
Liberal Democrats	Helen Elishmund	271	7.8	
Green	Catherine Shelley	229	6.6	
UKIP	Crispin Williams	127	3.7	
BNP	Michael Collard	42	1.2	
Majority		984	14.99	
Turnout				
Conservative hold		Swing		
Conservative hold		Swing		

=== Selsdon Vale and Forestdale ===
Selsdon Vale and Forestdale (2)
Party	Candidate	Votes	%	±%
Conservative	Andy Stranack	1,982	63.4	
Conservative	Stuart Millson	1,950	62.4	
Labour	Peter Buckingham-Stephens	649	20.8	
Labour	Deirdre O'Connor	646	20.7	
Green	Bryony Morris	228	7.3	
Green	Adrian Douglas	186	6.0	
Liberal Democrats	Jean Semadeni	178	5.7	
UKIP	William Bailey	176	5.6	
Majority		1,301	21.70	
Turnout				
Conservative hold		Swing		
Conservative hold		Swing		

=== Shirley North ===
Shirley North (3)
Party	Candidate	Votes	%	±%
Conservative	Susan Bennett*	2,748	54.5	
Conservative	Richard Chatterjee*	2,683	53.3	
Conservative	Gareth Streeter	2,454	48.7	
Labour	Mark Henson	1,900	37.7	
Labour	Robert Elliott	1,802	35.8	
Labour	Eunice O'Dame	1,705	33.8	
Green	Chris Sciberras	388	7.7	
Green	Frances Fearon	321	6.4	
Green	Sam Small	289	5.7	
Majority		554	3.88	
Turnout				
Conservative hold		Swing		
Conservative hold		Swing		
Conservative hold		Swing		

=== Shirley South ===
Shirley South (2)
Party	Candidate	Votes	%	±%
Conservative	Jason Cummings	1,869	52.6	
Conservative	Scott Roche	1,766	49.7	
Labour	Marzia Nicodemi	1,150	32.4	
Labour	David Percival	1,150	32.4	
Green	Liz Bebington	275	7.7	
Green	Andy Bebington	239	6.7	
Liberal Democrats	Christopher Adams	155	4.4	
UKIP	Kathleen Garner	143	4.0	
Liberal Democrats	Andrew Thynne	106	3.0	
Majority		616	8.99	
Turnout				
Conservative hold		Swing		
Conservative hold		Swing		

=== South Croydon ===
South Croydon (3)
Party	Candidate	Votes	%	±%
Conservative	Maria Gatland	2,345	49.8	
Conservative	Michael Neal	2,169	46.1	
Conservative	Jason Perry	2,108	44.8	
Labour	Stella Nabukeera	1,633	34.7	
Labour	Matthew Hill	1,606	34.1	
Labour	Paul Waddell	1,575	33.5	
Green	Stephen Harris	442	9.4	
Liberal Democrats	Michael Bishopp	438	9.3	
Green	Saima Raza	395	8.4	
Green	Marc Richards	339	7.2	
Liberal Democrats	Toby Keynes	294	6.2	
Independent	Mark Samuel	104	2.2	
Majority		475	3.65	
Turnout		4,719	40.08	
Registered electors		11,774		
Conservative hold		Swing		
Conservative hold		Swing		
Conservative hold		Swing		

=== South Norwood ===
South Norwood (3)
Party	Candidate	Votes	%	±%
Labour	Jane Avis	2,363	67.3	
Labour	Clive Fraser	2,356	67.1	
Labour	Patsy Cummings	2,338	66.6	
Conservative	Matthew O'Flynn	593	16.9	
Conservative	Tirena Gunter	575	16.4	
Conservative	Chidi Umez	559	15.9	
Green	Tariq Salim	305	8.7	
Green	Hania Wisskirchen	287	8.2	
Liberal Democrats	Alexandra Kellert	262	7.5	
Green	Marcus Boyle	256	7.3	
Liberal Democrats	Aoife Noone	189	5.4	
Liberal Democrats	James Clark	186	5.3	
Majority		1,745	17.20	
Turnout		3,534	31.42	
Registered electors		11,246		
Labour hold		Swing		
Labour hold		Swing		
Labour hold		Swing		

=== Thornton Heath ===
Thornton Heath (3)
Party	Candidate	Votes	%	±%
Labour Co-op	Pat Clouder	2,991	71.4	
Labour Co-op	Karen Jewitt	2,722	65.0	
Labour Co-op	Callton Young	2,458	58.7	
Conservative	Peter Anike	670	16.0	
Conservative	Aaliyah Brown	574	13.7	
Conservative	Shantelle Francis	570	13.6	
Green	Kirsty Bluck	374	8.9	
Green	Mark Lord	354	8.5	
Liberal Democrats	Michael Hunter	271	6.5	
Green	Matt Wilcock	191	4.6	
Liberal Democrats	Jean Ivanov	182	4.3	
Liberal Democrats	Martin Hammond	177	4.2	
Duma Polska	Malgorzata Roznerska	144	3.4	
Majority		1,788	15.31	
Turnout				
Labour hold		Swing		
Labour hold		Swing		
Labour hold		Swing		

=== Waddon ===
Waddon (3)
Party	Candidate	Votes	%	±%
Labour	Robert Canning	2,209	48.6	
Labour	Joy Prince	2,134	47.0	
Labour	Andrew Pelling	2,103	46.3	
Conservative	Alessia Cesana	1,683	37.0	
Conservative	Luke Springthorpe	1,645	36.2	
Conservative	Donald Ekekhomen	1,622	35.7	
Green	Nicholas Barnett	357	7.9	
Green	Grace Onions	326	7.2	
Green	Andy Ellis	260	5.7	
Liberal Democrats	Yusuf Osman	188	4.1	
Liberal Democrats	Karen Townsend	169	3.7	
Liberal Democrats	Alaric Taylor	145	3.2	
Unity in Action	Marianne Bowness	63	1.4	
Unity in Action	Winston McKenzie	59	1.3	
Majority		420	3.24	
Turnout				
Labour hold		Swing		
Labour hold		Swing		
Labour hold		Swing		

=== West Thornton ===
West Thornton (3)
Party	Candidate	Votes	%	±%
Labour	Janet Campbell	2,978	76.2	
Labour	Bernadette Khan	2,716	69.5	
Labour	Stuart King	2,640	67.6	
Conservative	Dominic Schofield	653	16.7	
Conservative	Alasdair Stewart	621	15.9	
Conservative	Matin Talukdar	563	14.4	
Green	Eileen Gale	364	9.3	
Green	Barry Buttigieg	278	7.1	
Majority		1,987	18.38	
Turnout				
Labour hold		Swing		
Labour hold		Swing		
Labour hold		Swing		

=== Woodside ===
Woodside (3)
Party	Candidate	Votes	%	±%
Labour	Tony Newman	2,647	63.3	
Labour	Hamida Ali	2,539	60.7	
Labour	Paul Scott	2,446	58.5	
Conservative	Rebecca Natrajan	823	19.7	
Conservative	Eray Arda Akartuna	782	18.7	
Conservative	Mus Tary	767	18.3	
Green	Christopher Brann	460	11.0	
Green	Elaine Garrod	362	8.7	
Liberal Democrats	Hilary Waterhouse	322	7.7	
Green	Lydia Regan	314	7.5	
Liberal Democrats	Sam Bayes	293	7.0	
Liberal Democrats	Luke Bonham	212	5.1	
Majority		1,623	13.56	
Turnout		4191	34.84%	
Labour hold		Swing		
Labour hold		Swing		
Labour hold		Swing		

== 2018-2022 by elections ==
Norbury and Pollards Hill by-election, 14 March 2019
Party	Candidate	Votes	%	±%
Labour	Leila Ben-Hassel	1,379	64.5	▼3.3
Conservative	Tirena Gunter	324	15.2	▼6.9
Independent	Mark O’Grady	162	7.6	N/A
Green	Rachel Chance	91	4.3	▼6.0
Duma Polska	Margret Roznerska	72	3.4	N/A
Liberal Democrats	Guy Burchett	70	3.3	N/A
UKIP	Kathleen Garner	40	1.9	N/A
Majority				
Turnout				
Labour hold		Swing		

Fairfield by-election, 7 November 2019
Party	Candidate	Votes	%	±%
Labour	Caragh Skipper	849	40.8	▼9.7
Conservative	Jayde Edwards	536	25.7	▼4.0
Liberal Democrats	Andrew Rendle	397	19.1	▲10.4
Green	Esther Sutton	237	11.4	▲1.1
Women's Equality	Heather Twindle	40	1.9	N/A
Independent	Mark Samuel	23	1.1	N/A
Majority				
Turnout			22.7	
Labour hold		Swing		

New Addington North ward by-election, 6 May 2021
Party	Candidate	Votes	%	±%
Labour	Kola Agboola	1,214	48.6	▼15.9
Conservative	Lara Fish	985	39.5	▲18.0
Independent	Michael Castle	109	4.4	New
Green	Tracey Hague	95	3.8	▼2.6
BNP	John Clarke	55	2.2	▼5.2
Liberal Democrats	Keith Miller	38	1.5	New
Majority		229	9.1	
Turnout		2,496	35.2	
Labour hold		Swing		

Kenley ward by-election, 6 May 2021
Party	Candidate	Votes	%	±%
Conservative	Ola Kolade	2,220	59.7	▼5.7
Labour	Stewart Sailing	618	16.6	▼3.2
Liberal Democrats	Adrian Glendinning	455	12.2	▲5.6
Green	Esther Sutton	372	10.0	▲1.9
Heritage	Zachary Stiling	52	1.4	N/A
Majority		1,602		
Turnout		47.1		
Conservative hold		Swing		

Park Hill and Whitgift ward by-election, 6 May 2021
Party	Candidate	Votes	%	±%
Conservative	Jade Appleton		52.5	▼3.5
Labour	Chrishni Reshekaron		32.0	▲1.0
Green	Catherine Graham		8.8	▲2.4
Liberal Democrats	Richard Howard		6.8	▲0.1
Majority				
Turnout				
Conservative hold		Swing		

South Norwood ward by-election, 6 May 2021
Party	Candidate	Votes	%	±%
Labour	Louis Carserides	2,276	49.9	▼18.9
Conservative	Sonia Marinello	1,173	25.7	▲8.9
Green	Ria Patel	423	9.3	▲1.0
Liberal Democrats	Luke Bonham	288	6.3	▲0.1
Taking the Initiative	Angela Kaler	251		N/A
Independent	Jane Nicholl	154		N/A
Majority		1,103	24.2	
Turnout		4,565	40.2	
Labour hold		Swing	▼27.7	

Woodside ward by-election, 6 May 2021
Party	Candidate	Votes	%	±%
Labour	Michael Bonello	2,375	47.9	▼12.9
Conservative	Michelle Kazi	1,315	26.5	▲6.6
Green	Peter Underwood	515	10.4	▲1.3
Liberal Democrats	Andrew Rendle	368	7.4	▲0.8
Taking the Initiative	Alison Johnson	219	4.4	N/A
Independent	Ian Bone	125	2.5	N/A
Independent	Mark Samuel	40	0.8	N/A
Majority		1,060		
Turnout		4,998	40.9	
Labour hold		Swing		
