= Croham Hurst =

Woodland in Croydon, Greater London, England

Coordinates: 51.3509°N 0.0773°W

- Site of Special Scientific Interest
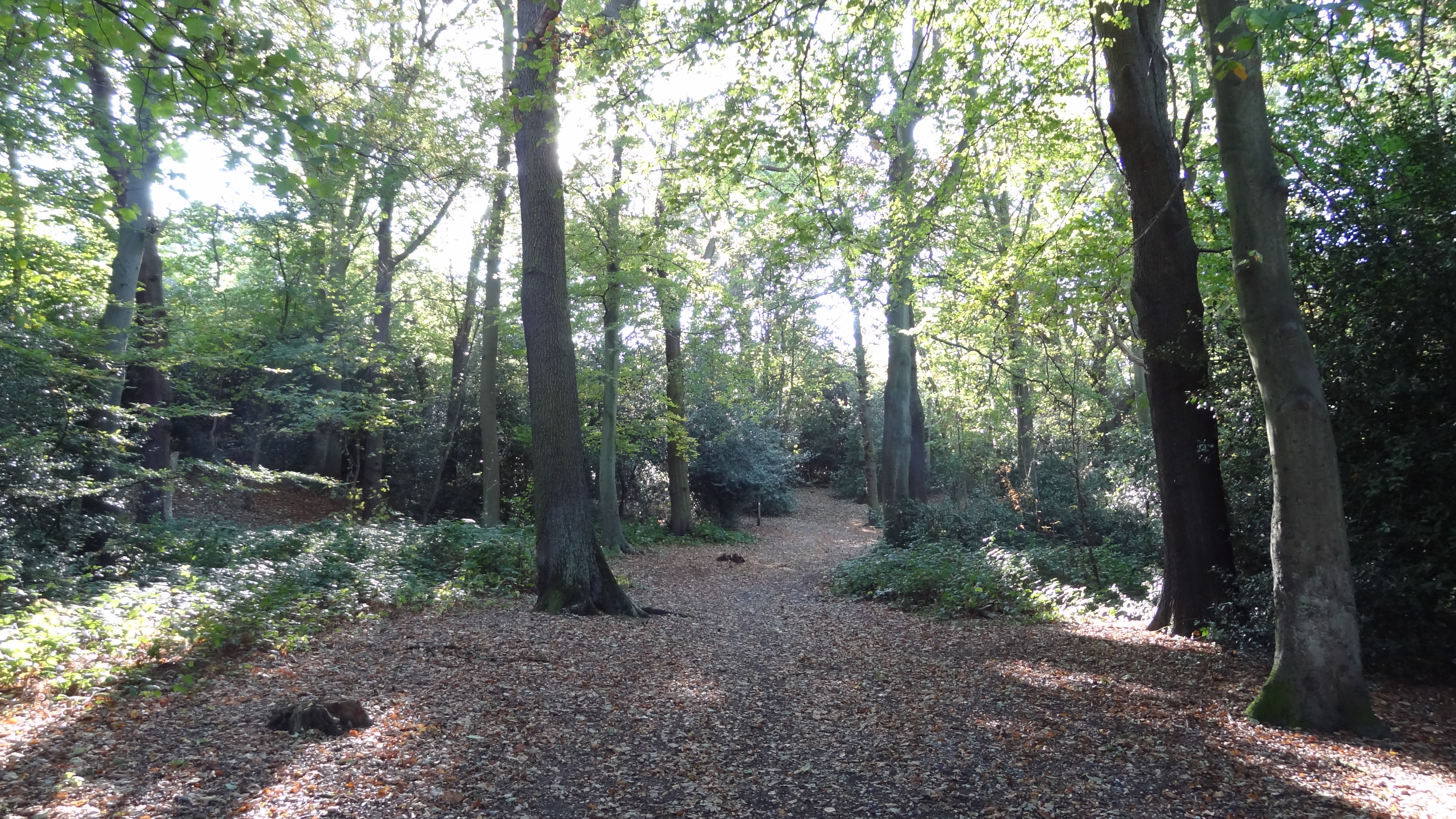
- Location of Croham Hurst.
- Area of search: Greater London
- Grid reference: TQ338632
- Interest: Biological
- Area: 33.6 ha (83 acres)
- Notification date: 1984
- Location map: Magic Map

Croham Hurst is a 33.6 hectare (83.02 acre) biological Site of Special Scientific Interest (SSSI) and a Site of Metropolitan Importance for Nature Conservation in South Croydon in the London Borough of Croydon. Its SSSI designation is due to its importance for nature conservation, but it is also a Regionally Important Geological Site.

The site is a steep hill, which is ancient woodland, although there are few very old trees because until the railways made cheap coal available, the timber was used for fuel. On the lower slopes there is a diverse community of plants dominated by oak and hazel on rich soils overlying chalk. Further up the trees are mainly beech on Thanet Sands, and towards the top the main trees are oak and birch on the acidic Blackheath pebble beds.

The Thanet Sands have eroded, but the Blackheath beds are bound by a natural cement, and this has resisted erosion to make a natural cap to the hill. The top is mainly bare of trees, with rounded pebbles made when the area was the base of shallow seas in the Eocene epoch around 50 million years ago. The sparse vegetation at the top is mainly wavy hair-grass, heather and bilberry.

== History ==
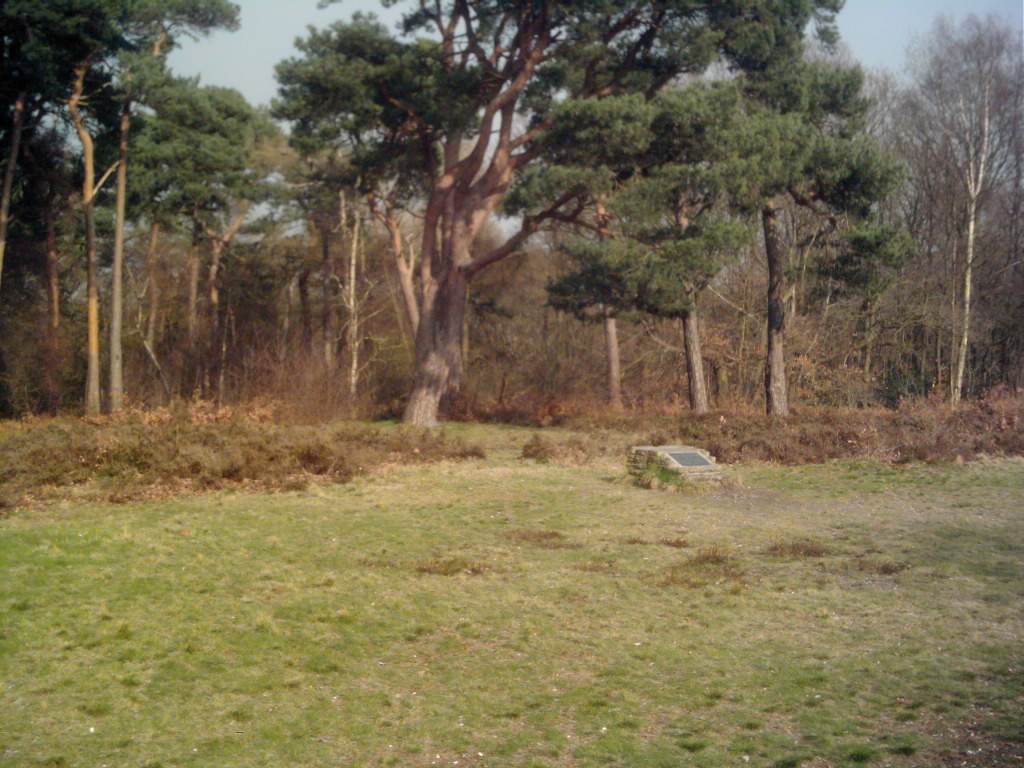
Croham Hurst round barrow (marker stone)

Its human occupation goes back thousands of years. In 1968 two hut sites were discovered with low turf walls, which were part of a Mesolithic settlement around 5,000 to 3,000 years BC. Neolithic flint tools show that settlement continued into the later Stone Age. There is also a Bronze Age round barrow, which is a Scheduled Ancient Monument, with a plaque marking the site.

In the medieval period Croham was one of the four manors in the parish of Sanderstead. In the late sixteenth century its then owner, Sir Olliphe Leigh of Addington, sold it to John Whitgift, the Archbishop of Canterbury. Croham Hurst then became part of his Whitgift Foundation, an educational and nursing charity which is still operating today. In the late nineteenth century Croham Hurst became a popular spot for visitors, few of whom knew that it was not public property. When the Foundation announced plans to sell the site in 1898, with the lower slopes being developed, the people of Croydon launched a campaign to save the site, which resulted in the whole of it being acquired by Croydon Corporation on 8 February 1901. It became part of the London Borough of Croydon in 1965.

The site was badly damaged by fire in June 2018.

== Access ==
There is access from Croham Manor Road, Bankside and Upper Selsdon Road.

== See also ==
- List of Sites of Special Scientific Interest in Greater London
