= Andrew Pelling =

British politician

Member of Parliament for Croydon Central
- In office 6 May 2005 – 12 April 2010
- Preceded by: Geraint Davies
- Succeeded by: Gavin Barwell

Member of the London Assembly for Croydon and Sutton
- In office 4 May 2000 – 1 May 2008
- Preceded by: Constituency established
- Succeeded by: Steve O'Connell

Member of Croydon Council
- In office 6 May 1982 – 5 May 1994
- Preceded by: James A. Keeling
- Succeeded by: Jason Perry
- Constituency: Broad Green (1982–1986); Coulsdon East (1986–1994)

Personal details
- Born: Andrew John Pelling; 20 August 1959 (age 67) Wolverhampton, Staffordshire, England
- Party: Liberal Democrats (since 2024)
- Other political affiliations: Conservative (1980–2007); Independent (2007–2011; 2022–2024); Labour (2011–2022)
- Education: New College, Oxford

Andrew John Pelling (born 20 August 1959) is a British politician. He was Member of Parliament for Croydon Central from 2005 to 2010, first as a Conservative, then from 2007 as an independent. He contested the seat as an independent at the 2010 general election, but lost to his former party.

He was also a councillor in Croydon and a member of the London Assembly. He joined the Labour Party in February 2011 but was subsequently expelled from Labour in February 2022. In early 2024 he joined the Liberal Democrats, and stood unsuccessfully for the party in Croydon East at the 2024 general election.

== Education and local government ==
Pelling and his family have lived in Croydon for six generations. He was educated at Trinity School, Croydon and then New College, Oxford, where he led the Oxford University Conservative Association. He was elected to the position of Librarian of the Oxford Union, a senior position, and ran for President several times without being elected, on one occasion losing to William Hague. Before becoming a full-time politician, Pelling was an international investment banker.

He was elected to Croydon Council in 1982 in Broad Green ward and later represented the ward of Heathfield. He served as Chair, first of the Education Committee in the early 1990s and subsequently became Deputy Leader of the Conservative Group when they lost control of the Council in 1994. From 2002 until 2005, he was the leader of the Conservative group in Croydon and stepped down from the Council in 2006 after 24 years.

Pelling was first elected to the London Assembly in 2000, and retained his seat in 2004. He was a member of the London Development Agency and chaired the GLA budget committee.

== Political career ==
At the 2005 general election, Pelling won the Croydon Central parliamentary seat by 75 votes, beating the incumbent, Labour's Geraint Davies.

On 28 May 2007 Pelling was one of 18 Conservative MPs to vote in favour of an amendment to the Freedom of Information Act proposed by David Maclean, which would have seen the Houses of Parliament and MPs exempted from the disclosure requirements of the Act. However, he was 625th out of 646 MPs in the expenses league table and did not take a second-home allowance.

On 18 September 2007 Pelling was arrested on suspicion of assaulting his wife Lucy after the Metropolitan Police received a complaint. He was released on bail later that night after being questioned. The police later announced that no charges were to be made against Pelling nor would the Crown Prosecution Service prosecute. The allegations caused the Conservatives to remove the whip, suspending him from the party.

In December 2007, Pelling announced that he would not seek re-election for Parliament nor the London Assembly, but he subsequently decided to contest the Croydon Central seat as an independent, saying "I am very much up for representing Croydon for another term, there are lots of important issues to speak about." He said that as an independent, he had the political freedom to best serve Croydon.

He has been quoted in 2010 as saying "Independence has allowed me to do politics differently, enabling me to put Croydon residents ahead of party politics and to lobby effectively for Croydon by being non-partisan. I do not have to obey party bosses and so can speak out for Croydon and on issues like immigration, an EU membership referendum and foolish overseas wars that the parties prefer not to speak of."

According to Pelling's own website, "The Leader of London's Green Party once called me 'the acceptable face of Conservatism'."

As an independent Pelling lost his seat to the Conservatives at the 2010 general election obtaining 6.5% of the vote in Croydon Central. He remained active in political circles, and attended the 2010 Labour Party Conference in Manchester. By 2011 Pelling had joined the Labour Party. In June 2013 it was announced Pelling would contest the marginal seat of Waddon in the upcoming Croydon Council elections. He was elected to Croydon Council on 22 May 2014.

In February 2022, Andrew Pelling was expelled from the Labour Party for leaks to the press, campaigning for a directly-elected mayor, and voting against the party on council tax cuts.

In the fourth episode of the Al Jazeera documentary "The Labour Files" it was revealed that much of the evidence used to prove Andrew Pelling had been leaking to the press was obtained through hacking the blog "Inside Croydon" with the knowledge of Labour staff.

In March 2024, Pelling switched party allegiance to the Liberal Democrats. Describing the Conservatives as out of touch with their 'one nation' roots, angered by their culture wars and believing that Britain was best suited inside Europe. Pelling was selected as the Liberal Democrat candidate in the new seat of Croydon East for the 2024 general election.

== Personal life ==
Pelling was married to Sanae for 16 years, and the couple had three children. In 2006, Pelling married Lucy. They have since separated after allegations of assault.

Parliament of the United Kingdom
Preceded by Geraint Davies	Member of Parliament for Croydon Central; 2005–2010	Succeeded by Gavin Barwell
