= Maria Gatland =

Irish politician

Maria Gatland (born Maria McGuire 1948, Dublin, Ireland) is a councillor in the London Borough of Croydon for the Conservative Party, who has represented the South Croydon ward since 2018. From 2002 to 2018 she was a Conservative councillor for the Croham ward. She is also a former Croydon Council cabinet member for education, a post she resigned after controversy due to being a former member of the Provisional Irish Republican Army.

== Early life ==
Gatland was born Maria McGuire, to a middle-class family, and lived in the suburb of Churchtown, Dublin. She was one of four siblings (two brothers and a sister). She was educated at St. Anne's Primary and Secondary Schools, Milltown, Dublin and then University College Dublin, where she studied English language and literature.

== IRA involvement ==
McGuire became a member of the Provisional IRA in July 1971. Three months later, in October 1971, she accompanied Dáithí Ó Conaill (a leader of the Republican movement, also known as David O'Connell) to the European continent on an arms buying expedition. The expedition came to nothing because it was reported in the British press, and Ó Conaill and McGuire abandoned the mission. She and Ó Conaill had an affair during this trip, although he was married. She, Ó Conaill, and Ó Conaill's wife had a difficult discussion about the issues involved shortly after they returned to Ireland.

Provisional IRA bomb attacks in Belfast, on 21 July 1972 (known as Bloody Friday) killed seven civilians and two soldiers, and left 130 injured. McGuire subsequently decided to leave the Provisional IRA. She was told by the British authorities that if she did so she would receive Special Branch protection. In the late summer of 1972 she appeared in London and wrote a series of articles for The Observer, went into hiding, and wrote a book about her experiences in the organisation called To Take Arms: A Year in the Provisional IRA which was published in 1973. In it she was hostile to Seán Mac Stíofáin, IRA Chief of Staff at the time she was a member, but remained sympathetic to Ó Conaill, and wished him success in internal struggles against Mac Stíofáin in the Republican movement.

== Political career ==
In 2002, Maria Gatland was elected as a member of the Conservative Party to Croydon Council as a councillor for Croham ward and in 2006 became Croydon's cabinet member for education. She says that she never hid her IRA past. When the Conservative Party found out about her past she stepped down as a council cabinet member in early December 2008. At the same time Gatland was suspended by the party, but in following month, January 2009, she was accepted back to the Tory fold. She was subsequently re-elected as a councillor in the 2010 and 2014 local elections.

== Personal life ==
Around 1986 McGuire moved to Croydon where she met and married her late husband Mervyn Gatland, who ran a garden maintenance business. Gatland has said that at this time she was very fragile and had two breakdowns.
