= 2026 Croydon London Borough Council election =

2026 UK local government election

- 7 May 2026

All 70 seats of Croydon London Borough Council 36 seats needed for a majority
- Registered: 286,933
- Turnout: 117,714; 41.0% (▲6.9pp)
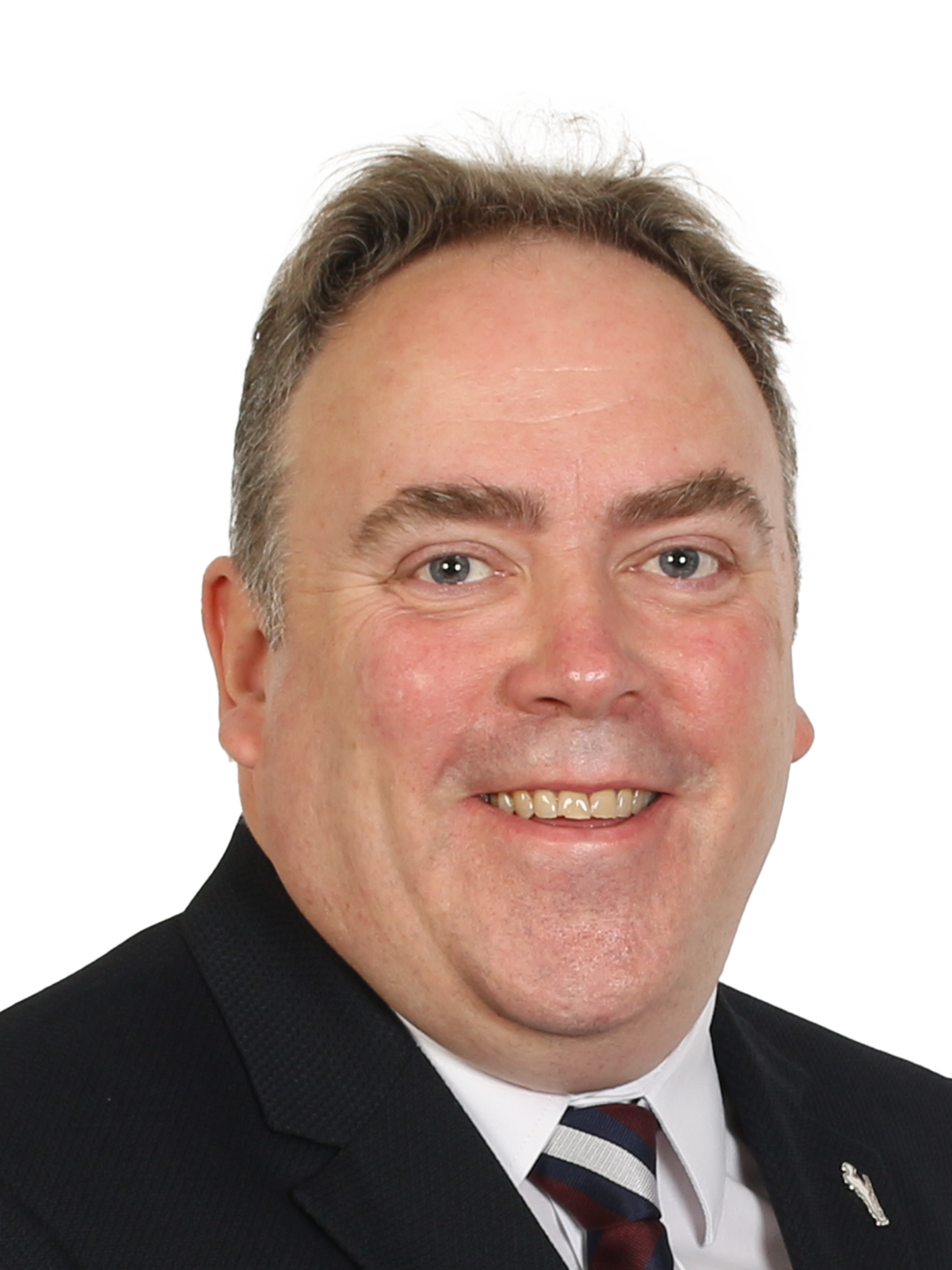

	First party	Second party	Third party
Leader	Jason Perry	Stuart King	Ria Patel
Party	Conservative	Labour	Green
Leader since	2 September 2020	May 2022	May 2022
Leader's seat	Mayor of Croydon	West Thornton	Fairfield
Last election	33 seats, 38.5%	34 seats, 34.5%	2 seats, 12.9%
Seats won	28 (Note: Plus the Mayor of Croydon)	30	8
Seat change	▼5	▼4	▲6
Popular vote	75,961	75,230	65,800
Percentage	26.6%	26.3%	23.0%
Swing	▼11.9pp	▼8.2pp	▲10.1pp
	Fourth party	Fifth party
Leader	Adam Kellett	Claire Bonham
Party	Reform	Liberal Democrats
Leader since	29 March 2026	May 2022
Leader's seat	New Addington North (lost)	Crystal Palace & Upper Norwood
Last election	Did not contest	1 seat, 11.7%
Seats won	2	2
Seat change	▲2	▲1
Popular vote	39,824	25,752
Percentage	13.9%	9.0%
Swing	▲13.9pp	▼2.7pp
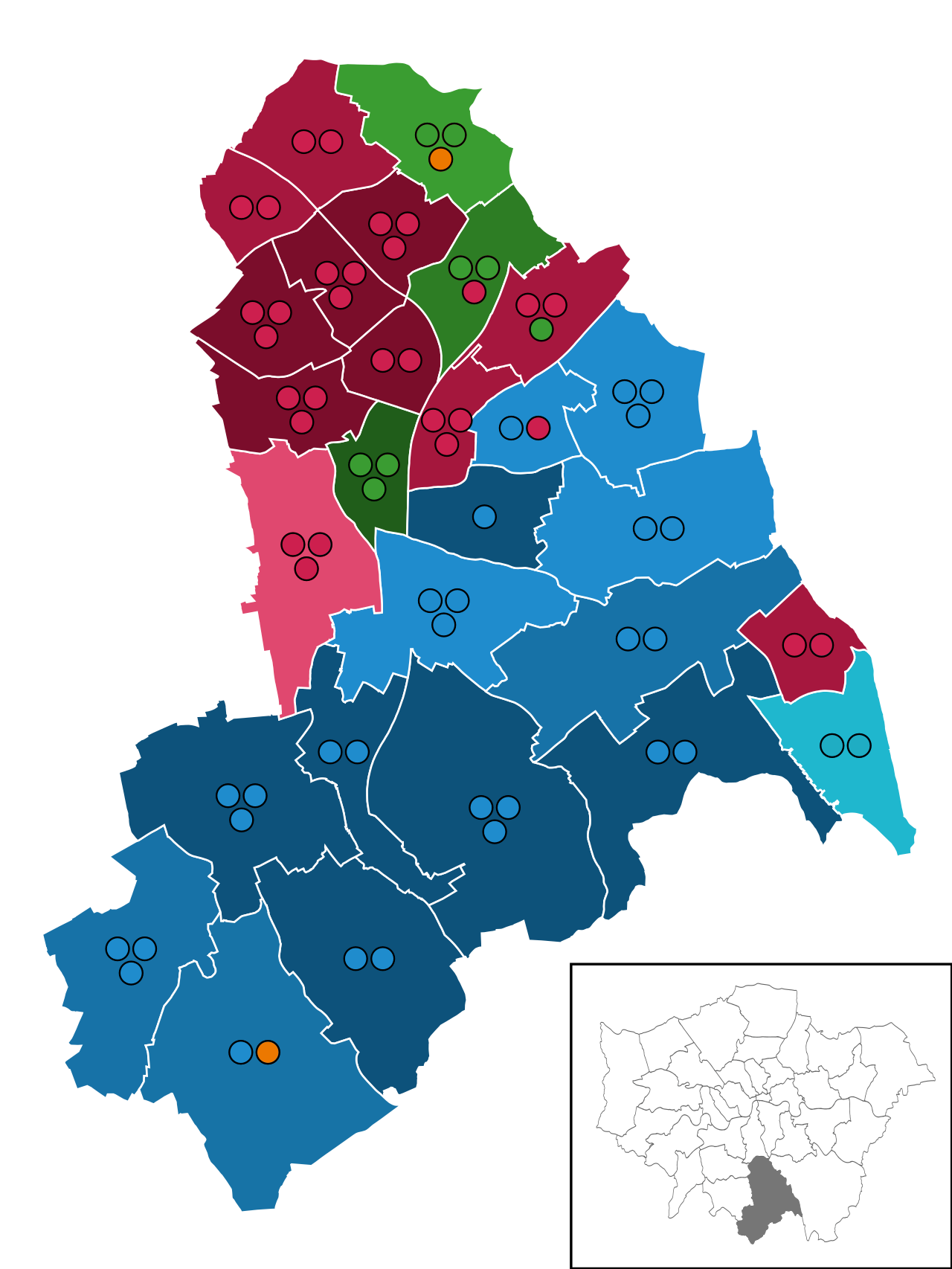
- Map showing results of the 2026 Croydon Council election
Control before election
No overall control
Elected Control
No overall control

The 2026 Croydon London Borough Council election took place on 7 May 2026, as part of the 2026 United Kingdom local elections. All 70 members of Croydon London Borough Council were elected; the 2026 Croydon mayoral election happened at the same time to determine the council's leader. The election took place alongside the local elections in the other London boroughs.

At the 2022 local elections, control of the council was won by its directly elected Conservative Mayor, Jason Perry, although Labour had the most elected councillors. The 2026 election saw Perry re-elected as Mayor, this time by a majority of 1,113 votes from Labour candidate Rowenna Davis.

Both Labour and the Conservatives lost council seats, while the Green Party, Liberal Democrats and Reform UK all made gains. Labour remained the largest party on the council.

== Background ==
=== History ===
Result of the 2022 council election

The thirty-two London boroughs were established in 1965 by the London Government Act 1963. They are the principal authorities in Greater London and have responsibilities including education, housing, planning, highways, social services, libraries, recreation, waste, environmental health and revenue collection. Some of the powers are shared with the Greater London Authority, which also manages passenger transport, police and fire.

Since its formation, Croydon has variously been under Labour control, no overall control and Conservative control. Councillors have usually been elected only from the Labour and Conservative parties, but in the most recent council election in 2022, the Green Party won two councillors and the Liberal Democrats won one. The office of Mayor of Croydon was first elected in 2022, and since then the council has been under no overall control with a Conservative mayor.

== Electoral process ==
Croydon, as is the case all other London borough councils, elects all of its councillors at once every four years, with the previous election having taken place in 2022. The election takes place by multi-member first-past-the-post voting, with each ward being represented by two or three councillors. Electors will have as many votes as there are councillors to be elected in their ward, with the top two or three being elected.

Croydon is one of five London councils led by a directly elected mayor; all voters across the borough vote to elect a mayor by first past the post system in addition to voting for their local councillor.

All registered electors (British, Irish, Commonwealth and European Union citizens) living in London aged 18 or over are entitled to vote in the election. People who live at two addresses in different councils, such as university students with different term-time and holiday addresses, are entitled to be registered for and vote in elections in both local authorities. Voting in-person at polling stations takes place from 7:00 to 22:00 on election day, and voters are able to apply for postal votes or proxy votes in advance of the election.

== Previous council composition ==
After 2022 election		Before 2026 election		After 2026 election	
Party	Seats	Party	Seats	Party	Seats
Labour	34	Labour	34	Labour	30
Conservative	33	Conservative	33	Conservative	28
Green	2	Green	2	Green	8
Liberal Democrats	1	Liberal Democrats	1	Liberal Democrats	2
Reform	0	Reform	0	Reform	2

== Campaign ==
Kemi Badenoch visited Croydon before launching the Conservatives local election campaign in March 2026, and stated that shoplifting would be a major issue.

On 28 March, Nigel Farage held a rally at Fairfield Halls. He announced that Reform UK would cut council tax and said there were 21 council officers on salaries above £100,000, despite the debt crisis.

In early 2025, the local Reform branch selected Sharon Carby as their mayoral candidate, apparently unaware that she had in fact died in September 2024.

== Election results ==
Council composition after the 2022 election

Council composition after the 2026 election

2026 Croydon London Borough Council election
Party	Candidates	Seats	Gains	Losses	Net gain/loss	Seats %	Votes %	Votes	+/−
Conservative	70	28	-	5	▼5	40.00	26.52	75,920	▼11.98
Labour	70	30	2	6	▼4	42.86	26.32	75,353	▼8.18
Green	70	8	6	-	▲6	11.43	22.98	65,800	▲10.08
Reform	70	2	2	-	▲2	2.85	13.98	40,024	NEW
Liberal Democrats	52	2	1	-	▲1	2.86	8.99	25,740	▼2.71
Taking the Initiative	15	0	-	-	Steady	-	0.66	1,875	▼1.14
Independent	2	0	-	-	Steady	-	0.25	711	▼0.35
Your Party	1	0	-	-	Steady	-	0.11	327	NEW
TUSC	3	0	-	-	Steady	-	0.08	242	NEW
Workers Party	1	0	-	-	Steady	-	0.07	186	’NEW
Equality	1	0	-	-	Steady	-	0.04	110	

== Ward results ==
Incumbent councillors seeking re-election are marked with an asterisk (*). Councillors seeking re-election for a different ward are marked with a cross (†).

=== Addiscombe East ===
Croydon Council Election 2026: Addiscombe East
Party	Candidate	Votes	%	±%
Conservative	Jeet Bains	1,199	28.4	−12.1
Labour	Maddie Henson	1,148	27.2	−8.9
Labour	Chris Galpin	1,114	26.4	
Conservative	Richard Hoque	974	23.1	
Green	Elaine Denise Garrod	788	18.7	
Green	Massimo Berta	753	17.9	
Liberal Democrats	Lee Michael Flanagan	545	12.9	
Liberal Democrats	Chris Adams	518	12.3	
Reform	Vanessa Calou	437	10.4	
Reform	Robert Jardine	365	8.7	
Turnout		4,215	48.11	+5.07
Conservative hold		Swing		
Labour hold		Swing		

=== Addiscombe West ===
Addiscombe West
Party	Candidate	Votes	%	±%
Labour Co-op	Nick Beall	1,547	35.0	
Labour Co-op	Patricia Hay-Justice	1,530	34.6	−7.5
Labour Co-op	Sean Fitzsimons	1,521	34.4	−9.4
Green	Antony Robert Coward	1,134	25.6	
Green	Adrian Robert Douglas	1,100	24.9	
Green	Saba Shafique Khan	1,088	24.6	
Conservative	Brad Michael Cook	706	16.0	
Conservative	Vidhi Mohan	626	14.1	
Conservative	Ranjiv Nagi	573	12.9	
Reform	Paul Reeder	573	12.9	
Reform	Richard Waddingham	533	12.0	
Reform	Leon Wright	499	11.3	
Liberal Democrats	Susan Ashby-Adams	426	9.6	
Liberal Democrats	Sasa Konecni	288	6.5	−4.7
Liberal Democrats	Szymon Zaborski	253	5.7	
TUSC	Athena Alexandra Chidera Reid	74	1.7	
Turnout		4,425	39.03	+7.02
Labour hold		Swing		
Labour hold		Swing		
Labour hold		Swing		

=== Bensham Manor ===
Bensham Manor
Party	Candidate	Votes	%	±%
Labour Co-op	Humayun Kabir*	1,370	35.6	−21.0
Labour Co-op	Mohana Manoharan	1,277	33.2	
Labour Co-op	Ellie Sandover	1,233	32.0	
Green	Caraden Davis	1,037	26.9	
Green	Simon Jones	914	23.7	
Green	Gareth Main	838	21.8	
Independent	Graham Mitchell	622	16.2	−3.0
Conservative	Graeme Fillmore	560	14.5	
Conservative	Gisela James	556	14.4	
Conservative	Jon Sanders	512	13.3	
Liberal Democrats	Ashley Burridge	410	10.6	
Reform	Ben Flook	396	10.3	
Reform	Gay Holder	320	8.3	
Reform	Akintunde Ogunlolu	258	6.7	
Workers Party	Syed Abidi	186	4.8	
Turnout		3,851	32.80	+4.63
Labour Co-op hold		Swing		
Labour Co-op hold		Swing		
Labour Co-op hold		Swing		

=== Broad Green ===
Broad Green
Party	Candidate	Votes	%	±%
Labour Co-op	Aba Amoah	1,919	43.4	
Labour Co-op	Tom Bowell	1,742	39.4	
Labour Co-op	Manju Shahul-Hameed	1,584	35.9	−20.5
Green	Ian Bridgeman	1,029	23.3	
Green	Samuel John	938	21.2	
Green	Tariq Salim	860	19.5	
Reform	Christine Bigrigg	823	18.6	
Conservative	Mary Croos	685	15.5	
Conservative	Titilope Fadipe	581	13.2	
Conservative	Alfie Kingett	521	11.8	
Reform	Roger Flook	504	11.4	
Reform	Tiju Thomas	474	10.7	
Liberal Democrats	Adrian Waters	353	8.0	−5.9
TUSC	Khamisi Greene	83	1.9	
Turnout		4,418	32.11	+5.59
Labour Co-op hold		Swing		
Labour Co-op hold		Swing		
Labour Co-op hold		Swing		

=== Coulsdon Town ===
Coulsdon Town (3)
Party	Candidate	Votes	%	±%
Conservative	Nikhil Sherine Thampi	2,105	37.6	
Conservative	Ian Parker	2,098	37.5	−16.5
Conservative	Luke Shortland	2,016	36.0	−13.1
Green	Ian Gillespie	974	17.4	
Reform	Anna Hills	959	17.1	
Reform	Richard Mallett	926	16.6	
Green	Jay Ginn	911	16.3	+9.0
Labour	Coral Carroll	871	15.6	
Reform	Jeff Wood	849	15.2	
Green	Dalijeet Singh	836	14.9	
Labour	Robert Barber	786	14.1	
Liberal Democrats	Richard Howard	764	13.7	
Liberal Democrats	Adrian Glendinning	691	12.4	
Labour	Steven Jack	634	11.3	
Liberal Democrats	Jason Reynolds	631	11.3	
Turnout		5,594	48.80	+9.47
Conservative hold		Swing		
Conservative hold		Swing		
Conservative hold		Swing		

=== Crystal Palace and Upper Norwood ===
Crystal Palace & Upper Norwood (3)
Party	Candidate	Votes	%	±%
Liberal Democrats	Claire Bonham	2,146	37.2	−0.3
Green	Natalie Vesty	1,833	31.7	+10.1
Green	Mark Adderley	1,784	30.9	+14.9
Green	Liam Shipton	1,544	26.7	+11.6
Labour Co-op	Sangeeta Gobidaas	1,504	26.0	−14.1
Labour Co-op	Will Linsdell	1,410	24.4	−13.8
Liberal Democrats	Nigel Dingley	1,349	23.4	−5.4
Liberal Democrats	Yusuf Osman	1,251	21.7	−3.8
Labour Co-op	Magnus Sorensen	1,162	20.1	−14.9
Reform	Ken Coales	492	8.5	N/A
Reform	Sue Millward	436	7.5	N/A
Reform	Sajan Xavier	355	6.1	N/A
Conservative	Desmond Wright	318	5.5	−9.0
Conservative	Phillip Marques	315	5.5	−8.6
Conservative	Fereshteh Emami	283	4.9	−8.9
Turnout		5,775	46.87	+8.95
Liberal Democrats hold		Swing		
Green gain from Labour		Swing		
Green gain from Labour		Swing		

=== Fairfield ===
Fairfield
Party	Candidate	Votes	%	±%
Green	Ria Patel	1,587	43.7	+6.1
Green	Esther Sutton	1,465	40.3	+3.4
Green	Paul Ainscough	1,452	40.0	
Labour	Davina Brown	1,084	29.8	
Labour	Chris Clark	984	27.1	−10.4
Labour	Cliff Colvin	841	23.2	
Conservative	Steven Jacobs	518	14.3	
Conservative	Peter Jarvis	501	13.8	
Conservative	Hina Amin	479	13.2	
Reform	Ed Marin	378	10.4	
Reform	Jill Thomas	338	9.3	
Liberal Democrats	Michael Hunter	329	9.1	−3.9
Reform	Sujan Mukhiya	313	8.6	
Turnout		3,632	31.06	+6.61
Green hold		Swing		
Green hold		Swing		
Green gain from Labour		Swing		

=== Kenley ===
Kenley (2)
Party	Candidate	Votes	%	±%
Conservative	Gayle Gander	1,835	47.3	−12.3
Conservative	Ola Kolade	1,680	43.3	−16.0
Green	Catherine Morris	660	17.0	+5.0
Reform	David Booth	631	16.3	
Reform	Kim Chadwick	564	14.5	
Green	Sabin Qureshi	508	13.1	
Labour	Rosie Malarkey	455	11.7	
Labour	Kacper Borkowski	428	11.0	
Liberal Democrats	Joanna Drake	351	9.0	
Liberal Democrats	Andrew Bennett	350	9.0	
Turnout		3,880	47.20	+7.77
Conservative hold		Swing		
Conservative hold		Swing		

=== New Addington North ===
New Addington North (2)
Party	Candidate	Votes	%	±%
Labour	Kola Agboola	887	36.8	−15.3
Labour	Afuah Ahorgah-Dorfia	766	31.8	
Reform	Nik Stewert	647	26.9	
Reform	Neil Watson	594	24.7	
Conservative	Adele Benson	512	21.3	−23.2
Conservative	Livinus Bondzie	367	15.2	
Green	Bernice Clare Golberg	326	13.5	
Green	Kelsey Trevett	276	11.5	
Independent	Michael Castle	89	3.7	
Taking the Initiative	Emmanuel AMUZU	51	2.1	
Taking the Initiative	Corey Williams	44	1.8	
Turnout		2,409	32.52	+6.89
Labour hold		Swing		
Labour gain from Conservative		Swing		

=== New Addington South ===
New Addington South (2)
Party	Candidate	Votes	%	±%
Reform	Scott Holman	1,003	34.0	
Reform	Adam Kellett	857	29.0	
Conservative	Lara Leigh Fish	835	28.3	−20.3
Conservative	Tony Pearson	802	27.2	−23.9
Labour	Laila Mohamed	672	22.8	
Labour	Edwyn Wood	619	21.0	
Green	Alexandra Leech-Gribben	392	13.3	
Green	Samuel Stevens	346	11.7	
Taking the Initiative	Faustina Amoah	63	2.1	
Taking the Initiative	Ralph Pemberton	53	2.0	
Turnout		2,952	36.33	+9.51
Reform gain from Conservative		Swing		
Reform gain from Conservative		Swing		

=== Norbury and Pollards Hill ===
Norbury & Pollards Hill (2)
Party	Candidate	Votes	%	±%
Labour	Leila Ben-Hassel	1,235	38.7	−15.0
Labour	John Wentworth	979	30.7	
Green	Karim Benze	923	29.0	
Green	Ferha Syed	878	27.5	
Conservative	Shakera Bowen	511	16.0	
Conservative	Tirena Gunter	490	15.4	
Reform	Pabiltan Parameswaran	306	9.6	
Reform	Bryan Whicher	283	8.9	
Liberal Democrats	Steven Penketh	282	8.8	
Turnout		3,188	36.67	+5.71
Labour hold		Swing		
Labour hold		Swing		

=== Norbury Park ===
Norbury Park (2)
Party	Candidate	Votes	%	±%
Labour	Appu Srinivasan	1,030	33.7	−13.4
Labour	Julie Setchfield	983	32.2	
Green	Ashtaq Arain	808	26.5	
Green	Mark Leggett	789	25.8	
Conservative	Don Charles-Lambert	573	18.8	
Conservative	Hony Premlal	546	17.9	
Reform	Maria Evans	293	9.6	
Liberal Democrats	Daniel O'Donovan	232	7.6	−2.8
Reform	Michael Swadling	222	7.3	
Liberal Democrats	Bryan Mahon Ball	211	6.9	
Turnout		3,053	38.38	+3.05
Labour hold		Swing		
Labour hold		Swing		

=== Old Coulsdon ===
Old Coulsdon (2)
Party	Candidate	Votes	%	±%
Conservative	Margaret Bird	1,640	40.8	−21.0
Liberal Democrats	Gill Hickson	1,342	33.4	−9.1
Conservative	Raf Makda	1,188	29.5	
Liberal Democrats	John Jefkins	1,044	26.0	−2.8
Reform	Nick Collins	761	18.9	
Reform	Angus MacDonald	624	15.5	
Green	Timothy Coombe	326	8.1	
Green	Nicholas Spicer	288	7.2	
Labour	Stephen Black	237	5.9	
Labour	Dora Makrogianni	167	4.2	
Turnout		4,023	52.83	+7.04
Conservative hold		Swing		
Liberal Democrats gain from Conservative		Swing		

=== Park Hill and Whitgift ===
Park Hill & Whitgift (1)
Party	Candidate	Votes	%	±%
Conservative	Andrew Price	829	40.7	
Labour	Karthika Dhamodaran	437	21.5	
Green	James Cork	401	19.7	+9.1
Reform	Ravi Sandrasegara	231	11.3	
Liberal Democrats	Andrew Thynne	137	6.7	
Turnout		2,037	47.01	+4.94
Conservative hold		Swing		

=== Purley and Woodcote ===
Purley & Woodcote (3)
Party	Candidate	Votes	%	±%
Conservative	Simon Brew	2,703	46.8	−16.5
Conservative	Samir Dwesar	2,514	43.5	−19.0
Conservative	James Hillam	2,419	41.8	
Green	Richard Lund-Vale	1,042	18.0	
Green	Brian Mulligan	1,028	17.8	
Green	Vikas Pai	939	16.2	
Labour	Danielle Taylor	777	13.4	
Labour	Tim Hemmersley-Rich	760	13.1	
Reform	David Brandon	753	13.0	
Labour	Joy Prince	735	12.7	
Reform	John Bray	716	12.4	
Reform	Caroline Wood	594	10.3	
Liberal Democrats	Chris Jordan	575	9.9	
Liberal Democrats	Simon White	426	7.4	
Liberal Democrats	Costel Petre	425	7.4	
Turnout		5,781	42.75	+5.33
Conservative hold		Swing		
Conservative hold		Swing		
Conservative hold		Swing		

=== Purley Oaks and Riddlesdown ===
Purley Oaks and Riddlesdown (2)
Party	Candidate	Votes	%	±%
Conservative	Alasdair Stewart	1,424	36.9	−19.8
Conservative	Endri Llabuti	1,380	35.8	−14.0
Green	Holly James	816	21.1	
Green	James Harrison	729	18.9	+5.4
Labour	Noah Choudhury-Simmons	719	18.6	
Labour	Emma Reynolds	684	17.7	
Reform	Andrew Fettes	498	12.9	
Liberal Democrats	Annie Jordan	379	9.8	
Reform	Paul Kyriakides	372	9.6	
Liberal Democrats	Peter Ladanyi	257	6.7	
Turnout		3,859	47.29	+7.88
Conservative hold		Swing		
Conservative hold		Swing		

=== Sanderstead ===
Sanderstead (3)
Party	Candidate	Votes	%	±%
Conservative	Lynne Hale	3,558	54.2	−15.4
Conservative	Yvette Hopley	3,498	53.3	−16.7
Conservative	Helen Redfern	3,380	51.5	−14.3
Reform	Gareth Heald	864	13.2	
Labour	Laura Doughty	851	13.0	+1.0
Reform	Patricia Owen	811	12.4	
Green	Maddie Trubee	806	12.3	
Reform	Natarajah Balachandra	793	12.1	
Labour	Alan Malarkey	768	11.7	+1.2
Green	Konrad Gawrys	756	11.5	
Green	Michael Hembest	747	11.4	
Labour	Michael Smith	599	9.1	
Liberal Democrats	Frances Conn	510	7.8	
Liberal Democrats	Jon Dean	461	7.0	
Liberal Democrats	Anne Howard	454	6.9	
Turnout		6,562	54.41	+6.05
Conservative hold		Swing		
Conservative hold		Swing		
Conservative hold		Swing		

=== Selhurst ===
Selhurst (2)
Party	Candidate	Votes	%	±%
Labour	Catherine Wilson	1,037	38.9	−14.6
Labour	Mohammed Islam	1,008	37.8	−14.2
Green	Catherine Graham	785	29.4	+14.2
Green	Yuri Manca	587	22.0	
Conservative	Mike Belliere	340	12.7	
Reform	Brian Putman	319	12.0	
Liberal Democrats	Daniel Houghton	241	9.0	−4.1
Conservative	Abdul Basith	233	8.7	
Reform	Jaweria Qureshi	198	7.4	
Turnout		2,667	30.13	+4.05
Labour hold		Swing		
Labour hold		Swing		

=== Selsdon and Addington Village ===
Selsdon & Addington Village (2)
Party	Candidate	Votes	%	±%
Conservative	Joseph Lee	1,389	35.7	−23.0
Conservative	Robert Ward	1,307	33.6	−22.6
Reform	Daniel Paterson	828	21.3	
Reform	Graeme Stobart	659	16.9	
Labour	Shazia Azizuddin	649	16.7	
Green	Matthew Bullock	622	16.0	+7.3
Green	Nicholas Shilton	577	14.8	
Labour	Ryan Coyle-Larner	539	13.9	
Liberal Democrats	Harrison Burton	298	7.7	
Liberal Democrats	Andrew Sparkes	257	6.6	
Turnout		3,888	48.83	+7.14
Conservative hold		Swing		
Conservative hold		Swing		

=== Selsdon Vale and Forestdale ===
Selsdon Vale & Forestdale (2)
Party	Candidate	Votes	%	±%
Conservative	Jack Barwell	1,293	36.2	
Conservative	Andy Stranack	1,240	34.7	−39.6
Green	Peter Underwood	852	23.9	
Reform	Jon Brotherhood	833	23.3	
Reform	Donald Speakman	713	20.0	
Green	Gary Kelly	651	18.2	+2.1
Labour	Jake Price	376	10.5	
Labour	Emmanuel Ehirim	369	10.3	
Liberal Democrats	Ewan Ridgewell	208	5.8	
Liberal Democrats	Hugh Dixon	205	5.7	
Turnout		3,570	48.97	+8.07
Conservative hold		Swing		
Conservative hold		Swing		

=== Shirley North ===
Shirley North (3)
Party	Candidate	Votes	%	±%
Conservative	Sue Bennett	1,707	33.1	−21.6
Conservative	Mark Johnson	1,477	28.6	−19.3
Conservative	Richard Chatterjee	1,470	28.5	−22.0
Reform	Alicia Bunn	1,197	23.2	
Labour	Priscilla Appeadu-Mensah	1,181	22.9	
Reform	Jonathan Clarke	1,133	22.0	
Reform	Geoffrey Morley	1,011	19.6	
Labour	Mark Henson	956	18.5	−12.3
Green	Pravina Ellis	900	17.5	
Labour	Kevin Redmond	895	17.4	
Green	Joseph Hague	782	15.2	
Green	Ed Linnington	714	13.8	
Liberal Democrats	Rachel Howard	413	8.0	
Liberal Democrats	Andrew Pelling	404	7.8	
Equality	Ellie Harrison	110	2.1	
Turnout		5,157	44.05	+8.67
Conservative hold		Swing		
Conservative hold		Swing		
Conservative hold		Swing		

=== Shirley South ===
Shirley South (2)
Party	Candidate	Votes	%	±%
Conservative	Jason Cummings	1,377	34.3	−17.7
Conservative	Scott Roche	1,206	30.0	−17.0
Reform	Paula Bucur	883	22.0	
Green	Liz Bebington	777	19.3	+4.1
Reform	Antony Vundi	737	18.3	
Green	Andy Bebington	733	18.2	+1.8
Labour	Stephanie Waddell	697	17.3	
Labour	Paul Waddell	688	17.1	
Liberal Democrats	Suzannah Flanagan	270	6.7	
Liberal Democrats	Andrew Saunders	229	5.7	
Turnout		4,020	49.39	+10.61
Conservative hold		Swing		
Conservative hold		Swing		

=== South Croydon ===
South Croydon (3)
Party	Candidate	Votes	%	±%
Conservative	Danielle Denton	1,718	30.7	
Conservative	Michael Neal	1,652	29.6	−8.9
Conservative	Matthew Dormer	1,570	28.1	
Labour	Bridget Galloway	1,481	26.5	−4.9
Green	Connie Duxbury	1,412	25.3	
Labour	Mathew Hill	1,176	21.0	
Green	Oliver Duxbury	1,149	20.6	
Green	Shujah "Josh" Iqbal	1,113	19.9	
Labour	Benji Sperring	1,091	19.5	
Liberal Democrats	Martin Drake	659	11.8	−3.4
Liberal Democrats	Peter Davies	620	11.1	
Reform	Mate Andrasi	594	10.6	
Reform	John Durling	575	10.3	
Reform	Terence Povey	530	9.5	
Liberal Democrats	Andrew Green	510	9.1	
Turnout		5,590	46.29	+7.88
Conservative hold		Swing		
Conservative hold		Swing		
Conservative hold		Swing		

=== South Norwood ===
South Norwood (3)
Party	Candidate	Votes	%	±%
Green	Tracey Hague	1,546	37.4	
Labour	Melanie Felten	1,426	34.5	
Green	Martyn Post	1,386	33.5	+22.3
Green	Ruban Segaran	1,331	32.2	
Labour	Christopher Herman	1,304	31.5	−10.6
Labour	Stella Nabukeera	1,240	30.0	−15.4
Conservative	Jude Ayim-Awusu	436	10.5	
Conservative	Alan Clarke	415	10.0	
Reform	Michael Ryan	400	9.7	
Taking the Initiative	Michael Pusey	388	9.4	
Reform	Jamal Frederick	378	9.1	
Reform	Zachary Stiling	357	8.6	
Conservative	Charles Tye	337	8.1	
Liberal Democrats	Chris Stock	300	7.3	
Taking the Initiative	Valencia Dawson	211	5.1	
Taking the Initiative	Jason Brown	208	5.0	
TUSC	Benjamin Goldstone	85	2.1	
Turnout		4,136	36.74	+6.35
Green gain from Labour		Swing		
Labour hold		Swing		
Green gain from Labour		Swing		

=== Thornton Heath ===
Thornton Heath (3)
Party	Candidate	Votes	%	±%
Labour	Jose Fernandes	1,698	38.2	
Labour	Vicky Newton	1,668	37.5	
Labour	Ben Taylor	1,509	33.9	
Green	Marian Hoffman	1,341	30.1	+15.0
Green	Angus Hewlett	1,261	28.3	+16.6
Green	Mark Lord	1,087	24.4	
Reform	Jamie Ahinasi-Blondy	460	10.3	
Conservative	Jeffrey Fisher	459	10.3	
Reform	Jorge Fidalgo	431	9.7	
Liberal Democrats	Andrew Barrett	406	9.1	−6.9
Reform	Charles Osaka	398	8.9	
Conservative	Matthew O'Flynn	393	8.8	
Liberal Democrats	Susan Watson	361	8.1	
Conservative	Heena Patel	359	8.1	
Liberal Democrats	Luke Bonham	349	7.8	
Your Party	Mel Mullings	327	7.3	
Taking the Initiative	Trevor Davy	137	3.1	
Taking the Initiative	Nadeen Andriesz	105	2.4	
Turnout		4,449	35.73	+5.49
Labour hold		Swing		
Labour hold		Swing		
Labour hold		Swing		

=== Waddon ===
Waddon (3)
Party	Candidate	Votes	%	±%
Labour	Rowenna Davis	1,890	38.8	−5.1
Labour	Sam Attwater	1,476	30.3	
Labour	Ellily Ponnuthurai	1,400	28.7	−9.2
Conservative	Simon Fox	1,270	26.1	−12.0
Green	Helen Lovesey	1,141	23.4	
Conservative	Donald Ekekhomen	1,076	22.1	−11.4
Green	Dan Shelley	1,016	20.8	
Conservative	Laksh Kumar	975	20.0	
Green	Callum Symons	876	18.0	
Reform	Ben Beeches	741	15.2	
Reform	Adnan Ghori	604	12.4	
Reform	Janusz Weyman	588	12.1	
Liberal Democrats	Robert Sherer	356	7.3	
Taking the Initiative	Jadah Archer	67	1.4	
Taking the Initiative	Sienna Rowbury	63	1.3	
Taking the Initiative	Jermaine Sam	55	1.1	
Turnout		4,875	37.55	+5.87
Labour hold		Swing		
Labour gain from Conservative		Swing		
Labour hold		Swing		

=== West Thornton ===
West Thornton (3)
Party	Candidate	Votes	%	±%
Labour	Janet Campbell	1,765	40.3	−25.9
Labour	Rym Daoud	1,368	31.2	
Labour	Stuart King	1,305	29.8	−31.5
Liberal Democrats	Jahir Hussain	915	20.9	
Green	Hannah George	797	18.2	
Green	Amber Ritson	780	17.8	
Green	Barry Buttigieg	751	17.1	
Conservative	Colin Humphrey	716	16.3	
Conservative	Sachin Mithia	693	15.8	
Conservative	Patrick Ratnaraja	643	14.7	−13.9
Reform	Barry Izzard	456	10.4	
Reform	Malcolm Lewis	439	10.0	
Reform	Kaleem Khan	393	9.0	
Liberal Democrats	Hilary Waterhouse	383	8.7	
Turnout		4,384	33.70	+6.55
Labour hold		Swing		
Labour hold		Swing		
Labour hold		Swing		

=== Woodside ===
Woodside (3)
Party	Candidate	Votes	%	±%
Labour	Amy Foster	1,933	40.8	−10.5
Labour	Brigitte Graham	1,594	33.6	−13.0
Green	Laura Bradnam	1,585	33.4	
Labour	Jessica Hammersley-Rich	1,462	30.8	
Green	Milo Ricketts-Mason	1,314	27.7	
Green	Nicholas Burman-Vince	1,285	27.1	
Conservative	Jane Parker	522	11.0	
Reform	Deryk Bull	517	10.9	
Reform	Barry Gray	517	10.9	
Reform	Kane Edland	490	10.3	
Conservative	Nymphiya Bhan	471	9.9	
Liberal Democrats	Lauren Adams	468	9.9	
Conservative	Henry Udechukwu	416	8.8	
Liberal Democrats	Tomas Howard-Jones	287	6.1	−4.5
Liberal Democrats	Arif Mohiuddin	221	4.7	
Taking the Initiative	Mark Emanuel	154	3.9	
Taking the Initiative	Amina Frea	144	3.0	
Taking the Initiative	Shane Sobers	132	2.8	
Turnout		4,740	38.52	+5.40
Labour hold		Swing		
Labour hold		Swing		
Green gain from Labour		Swing		
