= New Addington =

Area of South London, England

Coordinates: 51.3427°N 0.0167°W

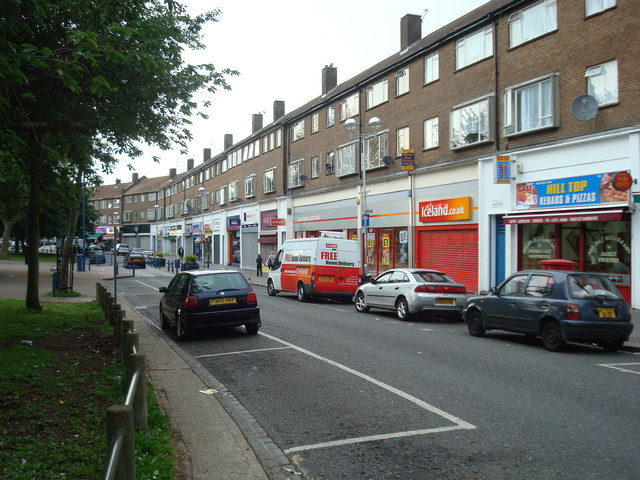
- Central Parade

- Location within Greater London
- Population: 10,801 (2011 Census. Ward)
- OS grid reference: TQ382622
  - Charing Cross: 12 mi (19 km) NNW
- London borough: Croydon
- Ceremonial county: Greater London
- Region: London
- Country: England
- Sovereign state: United Kingdom
- Post town: CROYDON
- Postcode district: CR0
- Dialling code: 020; 01689
- Police: Metropolitan
- Fire: London
- Ambulance: London
- UK Parliament: Croydon East
- London Assembly: Croydon and Sutton

New Addington is an area of South London, England, within the London Borough of Croydon. It is located 5 miles (8 km) south east of Croydon and is adjacent to the Greater London boundary with Surrey.

== History ==
Until the 1930s, the area now known as New Addington was farmland and woodland in the southeast of the ancient parish of Addington. The farms were called Castle Hill, Addington Lodge (later Fisher's Farm). At the time, central Croydon and London more generally had overcrowded slums causing concern to the authorities. In 1935, the First National Housing Trust purchased 569 acres (2.30 km^{2}) of Fisher's Farm with the intention of erecting a 'Garden Village', with 4,400 houses, shops, two churches, cinema, and village green. The Chairman of the Trust was Charles Boot, hence the earliest part of New Addington is sometimes called The Boot's Estate.

By 1939, when the outbreak of World War II suspended construction, 1,023 houses and 23 shops had been built. The new estate was popular, but the provision of amenities had not kept pace with the house building. Only one of the proposed schools and few of the shops were in operation. For employment, decent shopping and entertainment, the residents had to travel off the estate. This heralded a long history of isolation for the estate, then nicknamed Little Siberia, because it is much colder than the rest of Croydon. The isolation was partly remedied 60 years later with the arrival of Tramlink route 3, mentioned below. Tramlink runs alongside Lodge Lane, the main (northern) road access. There is only one other point of access by road, where King Henry's Drive connects with minor roads to the south.

After the war, there were concerns about the amount of green space being used for building around London and much of the countryside around the developing estate was designated as Green Belt land. The County Borough of Croydon bought the unused First National Housing Trust land and a further 400 acres (1.6 km^{2}) to add to it, for extensive further development. Many dozens of single-storey, detached, prefabricated houses (commonly known as "prefabs" of the "Arcon" type using corrugated cement asbestos panels fixed to a bolted steel frame as photographed in "A 1950s metal UK prefab at the Rural Life Centre, Tilford, Surrey.") were built in the Castle Hill area of the estate. These were inhabited until the 1960s when they were demolished and replaced with brick-built two-storey homes. At the same time as the smaller prefabs were built, larger two-storey semi-detached houses were also built. These houses, which had metal upper skins, still survive around the King Henry's Drive area near Tudor Academy (formerly Wolsey School). This was more development than had originally been envisaged but it brought about the structure of the estate as seen today.

Many more houses, blocks of flats, churches, factories and Central Parade with its shops, were built. The London Borough of Croydon obtained permission for a further 1,412 houses, which were completed in 1968. This area, at the Croydon end, is known as the Fieldway Estate and has developed its own identity to an extent. The total population counted by the 2011 Census was 22,280, of which 10,801 were in New Addington ward, with 11,479 in Fieldway ward.

== Reputation ==
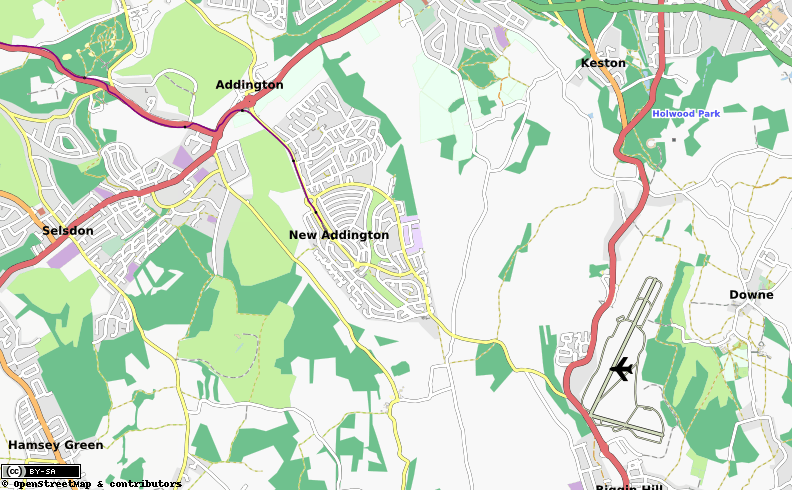
Map of New Addington, showing its distance from other Croydon settlements

The distance from Croydon and other centres, with patchy bus services being the only main transport links for many years, prevented New Addington residents from being able to access a full range of employment and educational facilities or indeed shops. A significant improvement was the arrival of Tramlink (route 3) in 2000, providing a connection with Croydon and Wimbledon in a little over 30 minutes, and from there connections to Central London. This provided the opportunity of a greater choice of schools and jobs. Several 'feeder' 'bus routes were also introduced to connect with Tramlink, along with general enhancement to bus services in the area. The area was declared one of the first Education Action Zones by the Labour government, with extra investment and opportunities for partnership for schools. The London Borough of Croydon increased its investment in the remaining housing stock and in the leisure and youth facilities. It also organised a neighbourhood partnership for the estate which local people lead to hold public institutions to account.

New Addington has however continued to suffer from various reports of violence and public upset for several years, reflecting upon anti-social behaviour and gang violence involving youths on the estate from the 1970s to the present, as well as the perceived poor standard of schools, low educational and health standards, and a reported high number of teenage mothers, particularly in Fieldway. In a Croydon Advertiser survey in 2013, New Addington, in comparison with other areas, was said to be the worst in Croydon to live, based on life expectancy, incapacity benefit claimants rates and income support, unemployment, crime, school exam passes, public transport accessibility and access to open space and nature.

The area was affected during the 2011 England Riots. A supermarket was destroyed by firebombs and stolen property was found in the area. An inquiry supported the provision of a local police station. A councillor praised local recovery from the riots, claiming the area was now a stronger community than before and rates of anti-social behaviour were beginning to decline.

The Fieldway estate came under criticism in 2011, following local resident Emma West being arrested and charged with a racially aggravated public order offence, weeks after a video was uploaded to YouTube of her racially abusing passengers on the Croydon Tramlink, attracting 11 million viewers by 2012. Her detainment on remand at HMP Bronzefield attracted a protest from the Britain First movement. On 1 July 2013 she was sentenced to 24 months' community service and ordered to be put under a supervision order, as well as receive mental health treatment.

The estate was also the scene of the disappearance and death of 12 year-old Tia Sharp in 2012. Residents of New Addington rejected comments from journalists who they felt inaccurately cited her death as an example in reflecting the area's issues.

In 2013, the area was featured three times in the same episode of Crimewatch UK, predominantly focusing on the area's gang culture.

== Demography ==
In the 2011 census, New Addington ward was White or White British (76%), Black or Black British (14.2%), Mixed/multiple ethnic groups (3.8%), Asian or Asian British (3.4%) and Other ethnic group (1%). The largest single ethnicity is White British (72.7%).

The most common household tenure were those rented from council (31% of households), followed by 29% of homes owned by a mortgage or loan. 7% of the economically active population were unemployed. The median age of the population is 34.

0.3% of the population (as well as Fieldway ward) commuted to work by bicycle, the second lowest in Greater London and only higher than Kenton East in Harrow.

The Office for National Statistics identifies a New Addington Built-up area with a 2011 population of 22,280, made up of New Addington ward (10,801) and also Fieldway ward (11,479).

== Politics ==
Politically, New Addington has traditionally been a Labour stronghold, providing the only five Labour councillors out of 70 in the London Borough of Croydon between 1982 and 1986. Four of the last six leaders of the Labour Party on Croydon Council have been councillors representing the estate, including Geraint Davies, the area's former Member of Parliament, and Val Shawcross, now a London Assembly member.

From 1965 to 1978 the area was covered by one ward, New Addington. The population of New Addington increased following the construction of the Fieldway estate and it was split into two wards ahead of the 1978 Croydon Council election, New Addington, which now covered the southern end of the New Addington area and Fieldway which covered the northern end of New Addington area and the Fieldway estate itself. The boundaries were modified slightly ahead of the 2002 Croydon Council election.

In 2006 the two ward had two Labour councillors each, both wards seeing strong challenges from the BNP. In the 2010 local elections, New Addington ward elected Tony Pearson, its first Conservative Councillor since 1968.

Labour won all seats on the estate at the 2014 elections and voted for Sadiq Khan in the 2016 Mayoral Election and heavily for Leave in the 2016 EU Referendum.

In the snap 2017 General Election, Gavin Barwell was unseated as the Conservative MP and replaced with Labour's Sarah Jones.

In 2018, following a boundary review, New Addington ward was renamed New Addington South and Fieldway ward was renamed New Addington North with minor adjustments to their boundaries. The Conservatives missed out on winning a seat in New Addington South by 180 votes, with Labour once again holding all four seats.

In 2022, however, the Conservatives won both council seats in New Addington South and one of the seats in New Addington North, with Labour winning the other.

In the 2026, the New Addington wards were a key target in Croydon for Reform UK. In March 2026, Nigel Farage campaigned in the area ahead of a campaign rally, and in May the party won both seats in New Addington South.

== Facilities ==
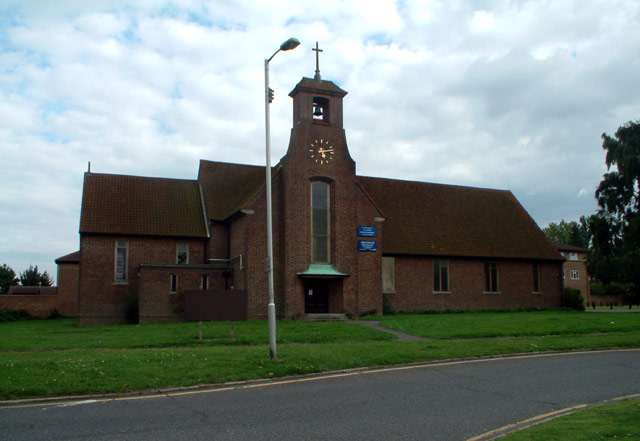
St Edward the Confessor's Church, New Addington

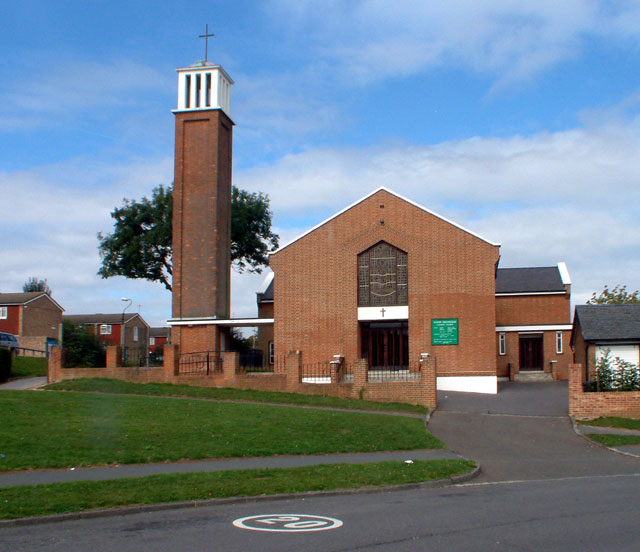
Church of the Good Shepherd, New Addington

The Anglican parish church of New Addington is St Edward's Church at the end of Central Parade, built in 1957. Fieldway, however, is part of Addington parish, under the 11th century St Mary the Blessed Virgin Church in Addington village. There are also a Baptist church, the Good Shepherd Roman Catholic Church, the Salvation Army and several other smaller places of worship.

Although most of the rest of Croydon has the London telephone dialling code '020', New Addington has the Orpington code for BT customers of '01689'. In recent years, cable telephone providers have entered the estate, using 020 for completely new customers, but existing BT customers transferring over to cable can retain the 01689 number if they so wish. New Addington is in the CR0 postal district, the largest (by population) in the country.

Since the beginning of 2006, Croydon Council have started a consultation with the local community with a view to regenerating the Central Parade shopping district and bringing in a partner to develop new housing and a supermarket retail outlet.

== Transport ==
=== Rail ===
The nearest National Rail stations to New Addington are Hayes, located 3.6 miles away, and East Croydon, located 5 miles (8 km) away.

=== Trams ===
The area is served by three Tramlink stops (Fieldway, King Henry's Drive and New Addington), linking the area with West Croydon and Wimbledon.

=== Buses ===
New Addington is served by London Buses routes 64 (24 hours), 130, 314, 464, and 664 (school route). These connect it with areas including Biggin Hill, Bromley, Croydon, Eltham, Hayes, South Norwood, and Thornton Heath.

== Gallery ==
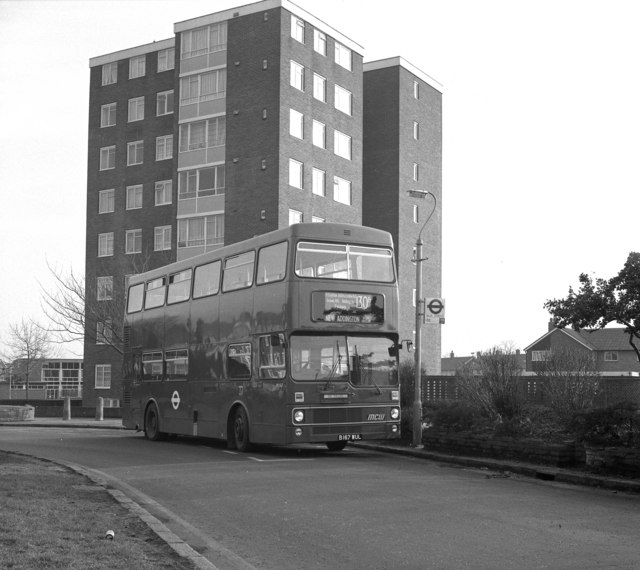
Bus no. M1167 on its first day serving route 130B in 1985

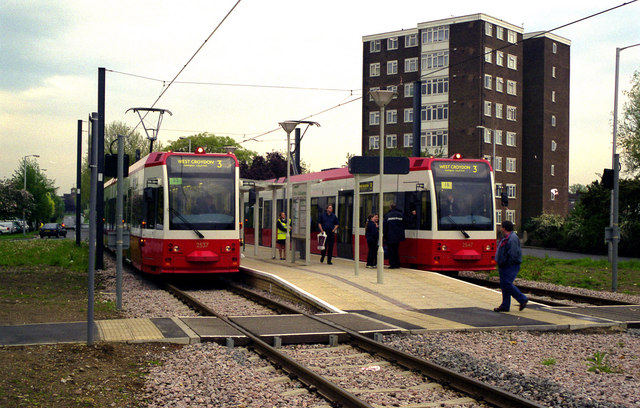
The tram terminus on the first day of service, 2000

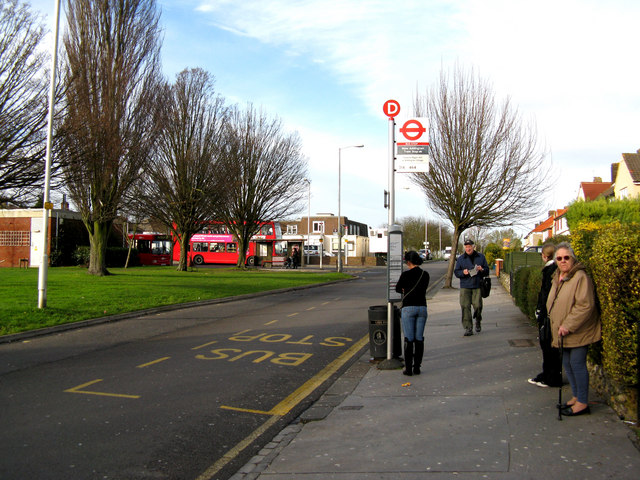
A bus stop scene in 2009

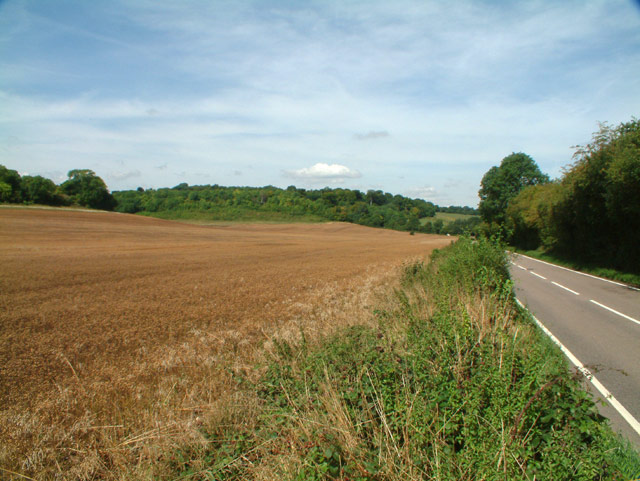
Jewels Wood, between New Addington and Biggin Hill

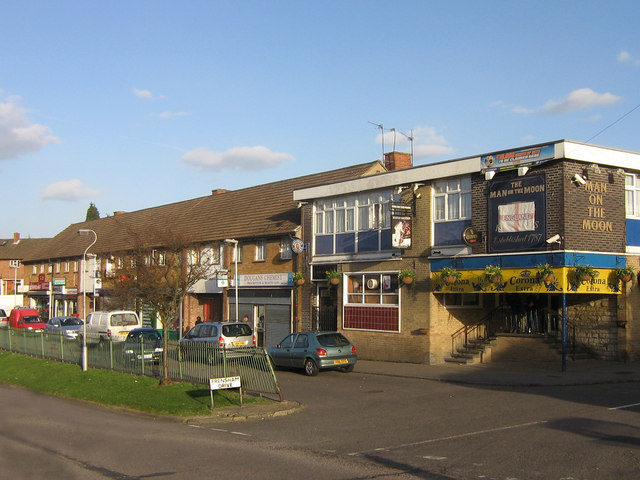
The Man on the Moon pub

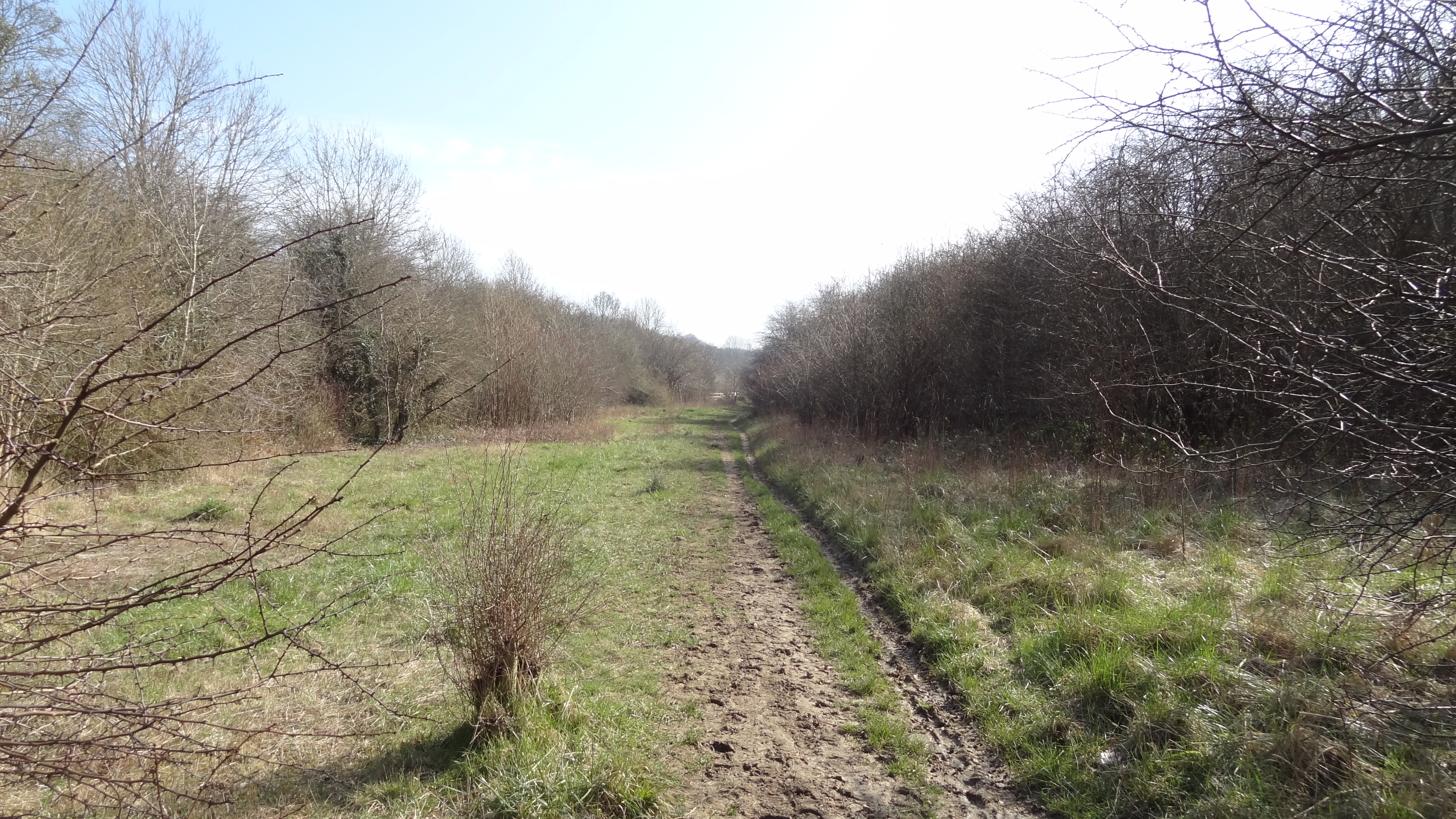
Hutchinson's Bank

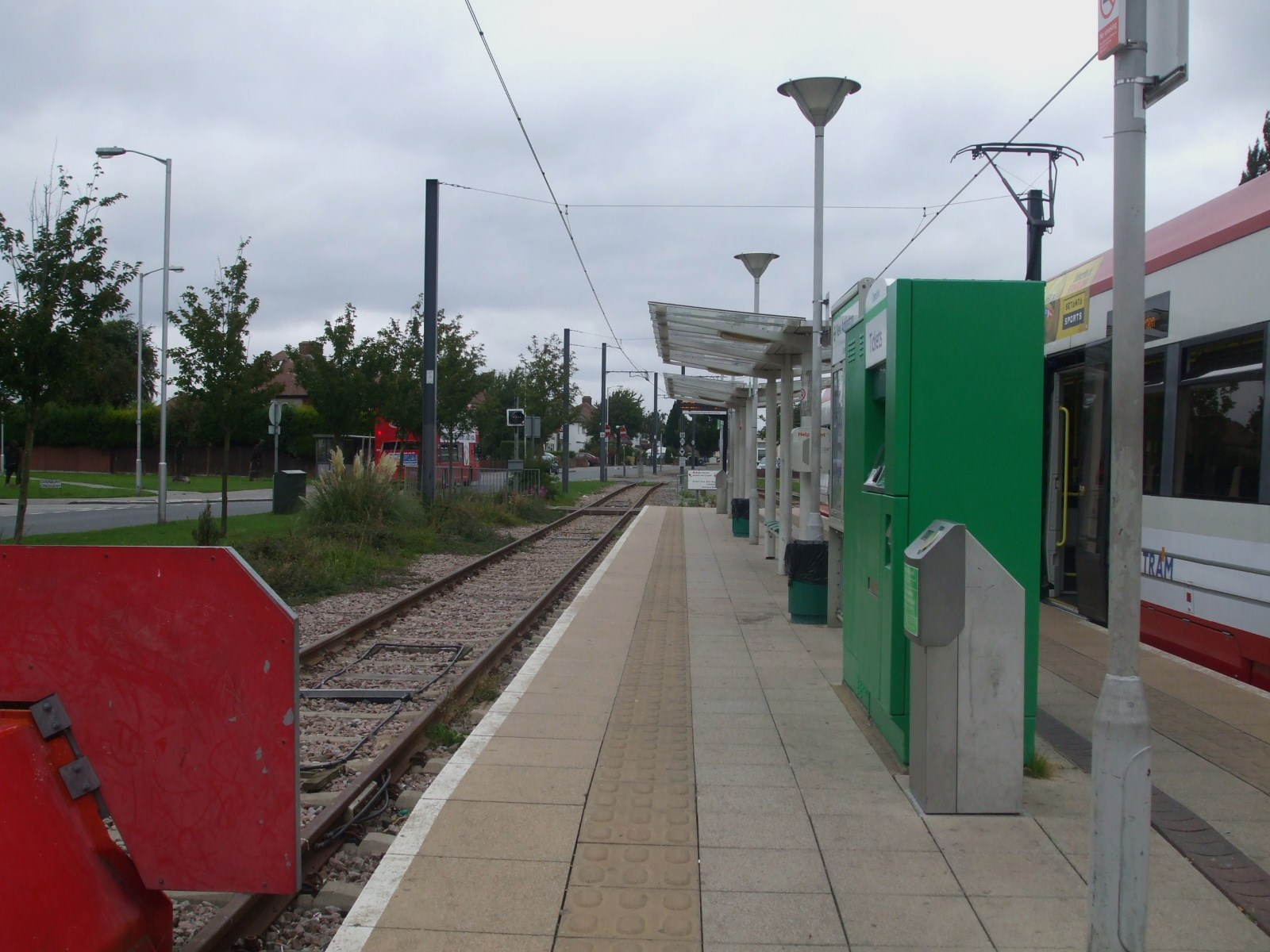
New Addington tram stop

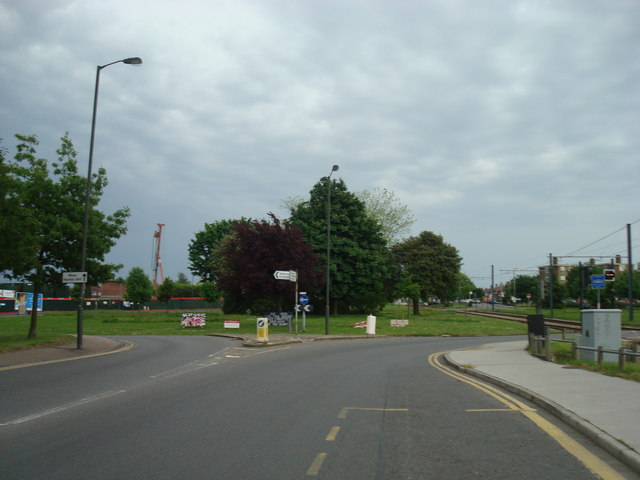
Parkway

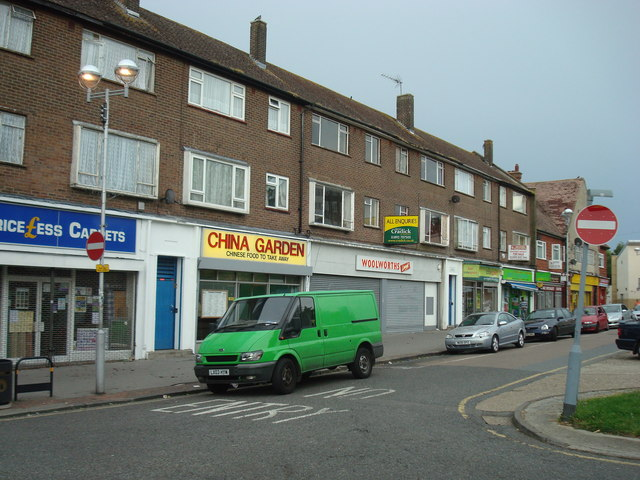
Central Parade
