= New Addington North =

Electoral ward in the London Borough of Croydon

Coordinates: 51.354°N 0.018°W

- ward for Croydon Council
- Boundary of New Addington North in Croydon from 2018.
- County: Greater London

Current ward
- Created: 2018
- Councillor: Kola Agboola (Labour)
- Councillor: Adele Benson (Conservative)
- Number of councillors: Two
- Created from: Fieldway
- UK Parliament constituency: Croydon East

New Addington North is a ward in the London Borough of Croydon, covering part of the New Addington estate in London in the United Kingdom. The ward currently forms part of the Croydon East constituency.

The ward returns two councillors every four years. On 6 May 2021, 5 by-elections were held in Croydon following the resignation of 5 councillors across New Addington North, South Norwood, Kenley, Park Hill and Whitgift and Woodside.

== List of Councillors ==
Election	Councillor	Party	Councillor	Party
2018	Ward created			
2018	Simon Hall	Labour	Felicity Flynn	Labour
2021	Kola Agboola	Labour	Felicity Flynn	Labour
2022	Kola Agboola	Labour	Adele Benson	Conservative
2026	Kola Agboola	Labour	Afuah Ahorgah-Dorfia	Labour

== Mayoral election results ==
Below are the results for the candidate which received the highest share of the popular vote in the ward at each Croydon mayoral election.

Year	Mayoralty	Mayoral candidate	Party	Winner?
2021	Mayor of London	Shaun Bailey	Conservative	✗
2022	Mayor of Croydon	Val Shawcross	Labour	✗
2026	Mayor of Croydon	Rowenna Davis	Labour	✗

== Ward results ==
=== 2026 election ===
Croydon Council Election 2026: New Addington North (2)
Party	Candidate	Votes	%	±%
Labour Co-op	Kola Agboola	887	19.4	
Labour Co-op	Afuah Ahorgah-Dorfia	766	16.8	
Reform	Nik Stewert	647	14.2	
Reform	Neil Watson	594	13	
Conservative	Adele Benson	512	11.2	
Conservative	Livinus Bondzie	367	8	
Green	Bernice Clare Golberg	326	7.1	
Green	Kelsey Trevett	276	6	
Independent	Michael Castle	89	1.9	
Taking the Initiative	Emmanuel AMUZU	51	1.1	
Taking the Initiative	Corey Williams	44	1	
Turnout		4,569	32.5	
Labour hold		Swing		
Labour gain from Conservative		Swing		

=== 2022 election ===
Croydon Council Election 2022: New Addington North (2)
Party	Candidate	Votes	%	±%
Labour	Kola Agboola*	832		
Conservative	Adele Benson	711		
Conservative	Michael Castle	679		
Labour	Sangeeta Gobidaas	653		
Green	Alison Gillett	172		
Green	Graham Jones	146		
Turnout		1,843	25.63	
Labour hold		Swing		
Conservative gain from Labour		Swing		

=== 2021 by-election ===
New Addington North ward by-election, 6 May 2021
Party	Candidate	Votes	%	±%
Labour	Kola Agboola	1,214	48.6	▼15.9
Conservative	Lara Fish	985	39.5	▲18.0
Independent	Michael Castle	109	4.4	New
Green	Tracey Hague	95	3.8	▼2.6
BNP	John Clarke	55	2.2	▼5.2
Liberal Democrats	Keith Miller	38	1.5	New
Majority		229	9.1	
Turnout		2,496	35.2	
Labour hold		Swing		

=== 2018 election ===
Croydon Council Election 2018: New Addington North (2)
Party	Candidate	Votes	%	±%
Labour	Simon Alexander Hall	1,209	33.65	
Labour	Felicity Anne Marie Flynn	1,119	31.14	
Conservative	Ace Nnorom	402	11.19	
Conservative	Phil Sheppard	360	10.02	
BNP	John James Clarke	142	3.95	
UKIP	Dan Heaton	141	3.92	
Green	David Thomas Beall	120	3.34	
UKIP	Robert King	100	2.78	
Majority		717	19.96	
Turnout				
Labour hold		Swing		
Labour hold		Swing		
