= Addiscombe East =

Electoral ward in the London Borough of Croydon

Coordinates: 51.385°N 0.057°W

- ward for Croydon Council
- Boundary of Addiscombe East in Croydon from 2018.
- County: Greater London

Current ward
- Created: 2018
- Councillor: Maddie Henson (Labour)
- Councillor: Jeet Bains (Conservative)
- Number of councillors: Two
- Created from: Ashburton
- UK Parliament constituency: Croydon East

Addiscombe East is a ward in the London Borough of Croydon, in London in the United Kingdom. The ward replaced the former Ashburton Ward, which covered the Ashburton area, as well as covering the main retail area of Addiscombe, the Stroud Green, Tollgate and Longheath Garden estates, and large parts of northern Shirley. The population of the former ward at the 2011 Census was 14,721.

The ward returns two councillors every four years to Croydon Council. At the 2018 London local elections Maddie Henson and Jeet Bains were elected. They were both re-elected at the 2022 London local elections.

The ward currently forms part of the Croydon East constituency, represented by Labour's Natasha Irons.

== List of Councillors ==
Election	Councillor	Party	Councillor	Party
2018	Ward created			
2018	Maddie Henson	Labour	Jeet Bains	Conservative

== Mayoral election results ==
Below are the results for the candidate which received the highest share of the popular vote in the ward at each Croydon mayoral election.

Year	Mayoralty	Mayoral candidate	Party	Winner?
2021	Mayor of London	Sadiq Khan	Labour	✓
2022	Mayor of Croydon	Val Shawcross	Labour	✗
2026	Mayor of Croydon	Rowenna Davis	Labour	✗

== Ward results ==
Croydon Council Election 2026: Addiscombe East (2)
Party	Candidate	Votes	%	±%
Conservative	Jeet Bains*	1,199	15.2	−22
Labour	Maddie Henson*	1,148	14.5	−16
Labour	Chris Galpin	1,114	14.1	
Conservative	Richard Hoque	924	12.3	
Green	Elaine Denise Garrod	788	10.0	
Green	Massimo Berta	753	9.5	
Liberal Democrats	Lee Michael Flanagan	545	6.9	
Liberal Democrats	Chris Adams	518	6.5	
Reform	Vanessa Calou	437	5.5	
Reform	Robert Jardine	365	4.6	
Turnout		7,865	48.1	+5.06
Conservative hold		Swing		
Labour hold		Swing		

Croydon Council Election 2022: Addiscombe East (2)
Party	Candidate	Votes	%	±%
Conservative	Jeet Bains*	1,545	22.0	
Labour	Maddie Henson*	1,377	19.6	
Conservative	Kyle Knight	1,347	19.2	
Labour	Tom Bowell	1,184	16.9	
Liberal Democrats	Andrew Bennett	434	6.2	
Green	Bernice Golberg	425	6.1	
Liberal Democrats	Rachel Howard	400	5.7	
Green	Nicholas Burman-Vince	308	4.4	
Turnout		3,817	43.04	
Conservative hold		Swing		
Labour hold		Swing		

Croydon Council Election 2018: Addiscombe East (2)
Party	Candidate	Votes	%	±%
Labour	Maddie Henson	1,903	23.1	
Conservative	Jeet Bains	1,754	21.3	
Labour	Caragh Louise Skipper	1,746	21.2	
Conservative	Joseph Lee	1,709	20.8	
Green	Tim Eveleigh	273	3.3	
Liberal Democrats	Andrew Bennett	207	2.5%	
Green	Bernice Clare Goldberg	197	2.4	
Liberal Democrats	Valerie Barbara Astles	197	2.4	
Majority		8	0.10	
Turnout		4,111	46.77	
Labour hold		Swing		
Conservative gain from Labour		Swing		
