= Purley and Woodcote =

Purley & Woodcote
- ward for Croydon Council
- Boundary of Purley & Woodcote in Croydon from 2018.
- County: Greater London

Current ward
- Created: 2018
- Councillor: Simon Brew (Conservative)
- Councillor: Holly Ramsey (Conservative)
- Councillor: Samir Dwesar (Conservative)
- Number of councillors: Three
- Created from: Purley and Coulsdon West
- UK Parliament constituency: Croydon South

Purley & Woodcote is a ward in the London Borough of Croydon. It is created from parts of Purley and Coulsdon West wards. The ward's first election is 3 May 2018.

== List of Councillors ==
Election	Councillor	Party	Councillor	Party	Councillor	Party
2018	Ward created					
2018	Simon Brew	Conservative	Oni Oviri	Conservative	Badsha Quadir	Conservative
2022	Simon Brew	Conservative	Holly Ramsey	Conservative	Samir Dwesar	Conservative
2026	Simon Brew	Conservative	James Hillam	Conservative	Samir Dwesar	Conservative

== Mayoral elections ==
Below are the results for the candidate which received the highest share of the popular vote in the ward at each mayoral election.

Year	Mayoralty	Mayoral candidate	Party	Winner?
2021	Mayor of London	Shaun Bailey	Conservative	✗
2022	Mayor of Croydon	Jason Perry	Conservative	✓
2026	Mayor of Croydon	Jason Perry	Conservative	✓

== Ward Result ==
Croydon Council Election 2022: Purley & Woodcote (3)
Party	Candidate	Votes	%	±%
Conservative	Simon Brew*	2,699		
Conservative	Holly Ramsey	2,666		
Conservative	Samir Dwesar	2,389		
Liberal Democrats	James Arneill	859		
Labour	Rebecca Chinn	698		
Labour	James Brady	688		
Green	Oli Green	628		
Liberal Democrats	Guy Burchett	609		
Labour	Mark Justice	596		
Green	Simon Hargrave	514		
Green	Anthony Mills	454		
Turnout		4,685	37.42	
Conservative hold		Swing		
Conservative hold		Swing		
Conservative hold		Swing		

Croydon Council Election 2018: Purley & Woodcote (3)
Party	Candidate	Votes	%	±%
Conservative	Simon Brew*	3,028	22.67	
Conservative	Oni Oviri	2,727	20.41	
Conservative	Badsha Quadir*	2,663	19.93	
Labour	Jason Arday	953	7.13	
Labour	Mark Justice	931	6.97	
Labour	Catherine Maud Wilson	809	6.06	
Independent	Donald Speakman*	379	2.84	
Liberal Democrats	James Iestyn Arneill	377	2.82	
Liberal Democrats	Frances Margaret Conn	376	2.81	
Green	Wendy Katherine Harding	347	2.60	
Liberal Democrats	Andy Sparkes	314	2.35	
Green	Simon Edward Hargrave	296	2.22	
Green	Martyn John Post	159	1.19	
Majority		1,710	12.8	
Turnout				
Conservative hold		Swing		
Conservative hold		Swing		
Conservative hold		Swing		
