= 2026 Croydon mayoral election =

Local election in England

- 7 May 2026

The Mayor of Croydon
- Turnout: 40.9%
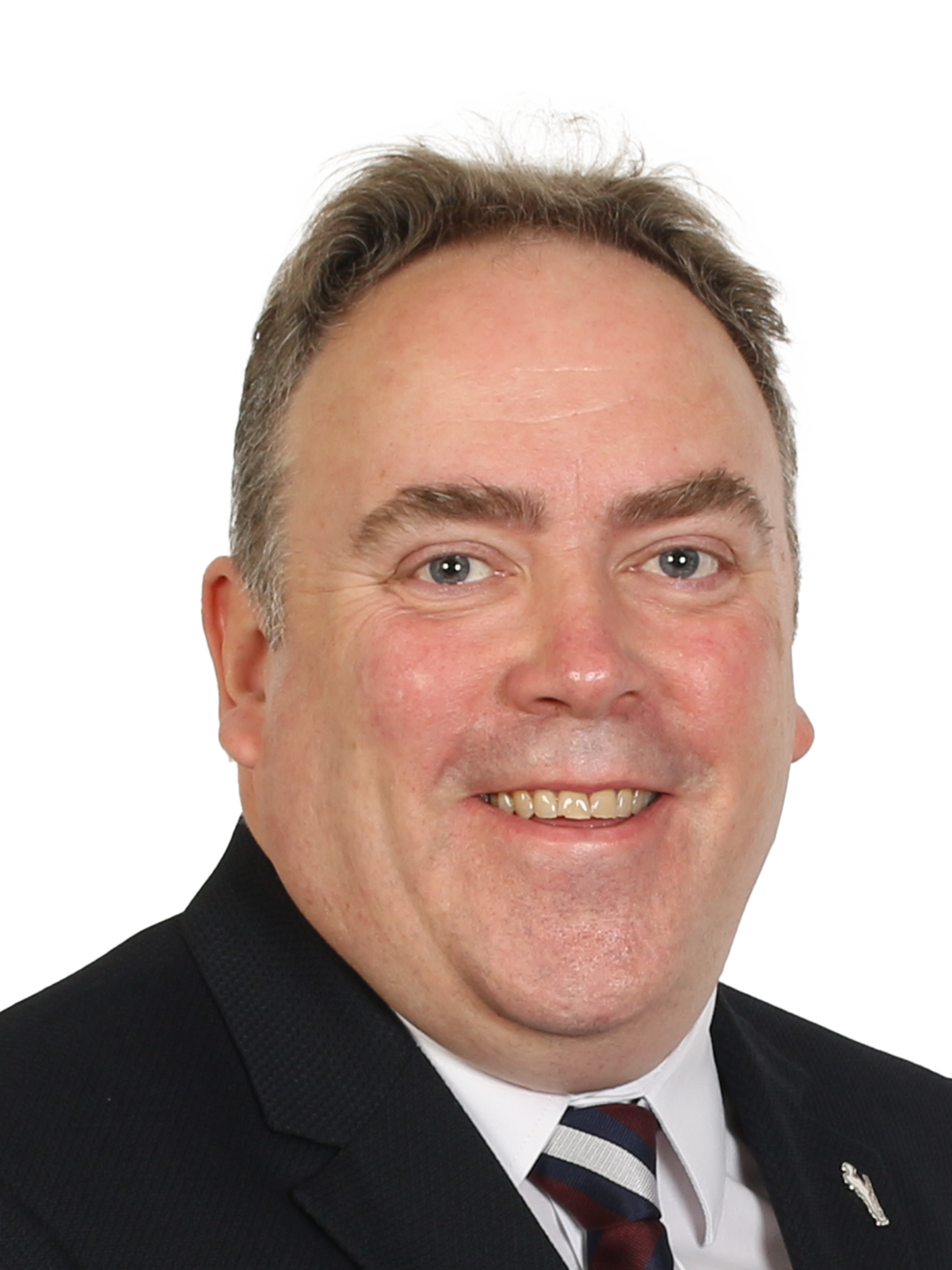

	First party	Second party	Third party
Candidate	Jason Perry	Rowenna Davis	Peter Underwood
Party	Conservative	Labour	Green
Last election	34.8% (first round); 50.4% (second round)	32.7% (first round); 49.6% (second round)	6.5% (first round)
Popular vote	35,871	34,758	19,404
Percentage	30.7%	29.7%	16.6%
	Fourth party	Fifth party	Sixth party
Candidate	Ben Flook (Note: Reform UK had selected Sharon Carby until August 2025.)	Richard Howard	Michael Pusey
Party	Reform	Liberal Democrats	Taking the Initiative
Last election	Did not stand	10.4% (first round)	6.0% (first round)
Popular vote	14,467	7,815	2,597
Percentage	12.4%	6.7%	2.2%
Mayor before election
Jason Perry
Conservative
Mayor
Jason Perry
Conservative

The 2026 Croydon mayoral election was held on 7 May 2026 to elect the mayor of Croydon, London. The election was on the same day as the local elections in many other parts of the country, including the Croydon local council election.

Incumbent mayor Jason Perry of the Conservative Party won the election with 30.7% of the vote.

== Background ==
The position of Mayor of Croydon was established in 2022; Jason Perry of the Conservative Party narrowly won first mayoral election in 2022.

== Electoral system ==
The election uses the voting system of first past the post to elect the mayor, having been changed from the supplementary vote system in 2022. In first past the post, there is only one count, and the candidate with the most votes wins. The Electoral Reform Society described the move to first past the post as one lowering the bar for politicians and thus damaging British democracy.

== Candidates ==
The mayoral election had eight candidates. Labour's Rowenna Davis and the Green Party's Peter Underwood were seen as the strongest challengers to the Conservatives' Jason Perry.

In early 2025, Reform UK had selected Sharon Carby as their candidate, however she had reportedly died in September 2024. Ben Flook, a Conservative candidate for Chesterfield at the 2024 general election was selected.

== Results by ward ==
As published by Croydon Council.

=== Addiscombe East ===
Addiscombe East
Party	Candidate	Votes	%	±%
Labour Co-op	Rowenna Davis	1,405	33.4	▼2.7
Conservative	Jason Perry	1,314	31.2	▼3.4
Green	Peter Underwood	634	15.1	▲8.9
Reform	Ben Flook	385	9.1	New
Liberal Democrats	Richard Howard	344	8.2	▼0.7
Independent	Jose Joseph	61	1.4	New
Taking the Initiative	Michael Pusey MBE	55	1.3	▼3.3
TUSC	Ben Goldstone	10	0.2	New
Turnout				
Rejected ballots				
Registered electors				

=== Addiscombe West ===
Addiscombe West
Party	Candidate	Votes	%	±%
Labour Co-op	Rowenna Davis	1,783	40.3	▼1.2
Conservative	Jason Perry	875	19.8	▼2.8
Green	Peter Underwood	830	18.8	▲10.4
Reform	Ben Flook	472	10.7	New
Liberal Democrats	Richard Howard	220	5.0	▼4.3
Independent	Jose Joseph	136	3.1	New
Taking the Initiative	Michael Pusey MBE	80	1.8	▼4.5
TUSC	Ben Goldstone	23	0.5	New
Turnout				
Rejected ballots				
Registered electors				

=== Bensham Manor ===
Bensham Manor
Party	Candidate	Votes	%	±%
Labour Co-op	Rowenna Davis	1,574	41.0	▼11.3
Conservative	Jason Perry	750	19.5	▲2.3
Green	Peter Underwood	745	19.4	▲13.6
Reform	Ben Flook	304	7.9	New
Liberal Democrats	Richard Howard	224	5.8	▼1.1
Taking the Initiative	Michael Pusey MBE	146	3.8	▼4.0
Independent	Jose Joseph	64	1.7	New
TUSC	Ben Goldstone	30	0.8	New
Turnout				
Rejected ballots				
Registered electors				

=== Broad Green ===
Broad Green
Party	Candidate	Votes	%	±%
Labour Co-op	Rowenna Davis	1,974	44.8	▼8.8
Conservative	Jason Perry	726	16.5	▼4.5
Green	Peter Underwood	712	16.2	▲11.6
Reform	Ben Flook	478	10.8	New
Liberal Democrats	Richard Howard	208	4.7	▼2.7
Independent	Jose Joseph	183	4.2	New
Taking the Initiative	Michael Pusey MBE	105	2.4	▼4.6
TUSC	Ben Goldstone	20	0.5	New
Turnout				
Rejected ballots				
Registered electors				

=== Coulsdon Town ===
Coulsdon Town
Party	Candidate	Votes	%	±%
Conservative	Jason Perry	2,423	43.4	▼5.9
Labour Co-op	Rowenna Davis	963	17.2	▼0.3
Reform	Ben Flook	831	14.9	New
Green	Peter Underwood	713	12.8	▲7.1
Liberal Democrats	Richard Howard	529	9.5	▼5.8
Taking the Initiative	Michael Pusey MBE	58	1.0	▼3.1
Independent	Jose Joseph	46	0.8	New
TUSC	Ben Goldstone	22	0.4	New
Turnout				
Rejected ballots				
Registered electors				

=== Crystal Palace & Upper Norwood ===
Crystal Palace & Upper Norwood
Party	Candidate	Votes	%	±%
Labour Co-op	Rowenna Davis	2,105	36.5	▼4.8
Green	Peter Underwood	1,534	26.6	▲15.1
Liberal Democrats	Richard Howard	951	16.5	▼6.6
Conservative	Jason Perry	592	10.3	▼3.5
Reform	Ben Flook	462	8.0	New
Taking the Initiative	Michael Pusey MBE	83	1.4	▼3.9
TUSC	Ben Goldstone	83	1.4	New
Independent	Jose Joseph	22	0.4	New
Turnout				
Rejected ballots				
Registered electors				

=== Fairfield ===
Fairfield
Party	Candidate	Votes	%	±%
Labour Co-op	Rowenna Davis	1,252	34.4	▼0.4
Green	Peter Underwood	1,080	29.7	▲4.7
Conservative	Jason Perry	641	17.6	▲0.5
Reform	Ben Flook	312	8.6	New
Independent	Jose Joseph	153	4.2	New
Liberal Democrats	Richard Howard	131	3.6	▼4.1
Taking the Initiative	Michael Pusey MBE	52	1.4	▼6.1
TUSC	Ben Goldstone	16	0.4	New
Turnout				
Rejected ballots				
Registered electors				

=== Kenley ===
Kenley
Party	Candidate	Votes	%	±%
Conservative	Jason Perry	1,884	48.7	▼7.1
Labour Co-op	Rowenna Davis	586	15.1	▲1.9
Reform	Ben Flook	547	14.1	New
Green	Peter Underwood	473	12.2	▲6.9
Liberal Democrats	Richard Howard	292	7.5	▼3.9
Taking the Initiative	Michael Pusey MBE	57	1.5	▼2.4
Independent	Jose Joseph	24	0.6	New
TUSC	Ben Goldstone	6	0.2	New
Turnout				
Rejected ballots				
Registered electors				

=== New Addington North ===
New Addington North
Party	Candidate	Votes	%	±%
Labour Co-op	Rowenna Davis	879	36.7	▼6.5
Reform	Ben Flook	609	25.4	New
Conservative	Jason Perry	514	21.5	▼13.4
Green	Peter Underwood	257	10.7	▲6.4
Liberal Democrats	Richard Howard	47	2.0	▼2.9
Taking the Initiative	Michael Pusey MBE	55	2.3	▼1.9
Independent	Jose Joseph	19	0.8	New
TUSC	Ben Goldstone	14	0.6	New
Turnout				
Rejected ballots				
Registered electors				

=== New Addington South ===
New Addington South
Party	Candidate	Votes	%	±%
Reform	Ben Flook	881	30.0	New
Conservative	Jason Perry	858	29.2	▼11.2
Labour Co-op	Rowenna Davis	743	25.3	▼12.3
Green	Peter Underwood	276	9.4	▲5.7
Liberal Democrats	Richard Howard	98	3.3	▼3.0
Taking the Initiative	Michael Pusey MBE	45	1.5	▼1.9
Independent	Jose Joseph	26	0.9	New
TUSC	Ben Goldstone	14	0.5	New
Turnout				
Rejected ballots				
Registered electors				

=== Norbury & Pollards Hill ===
Norbury & Pollards Hill
Party	Candidate	Votes	%	±%
Labour Co-op	Rowenna Davis	1,178	37.1	▼11.0
Green	Peter Underwood	774	24.4	▲18.3
Conservative	Jason Perry	625	19.7	▼2.2
Reform	Ben Flook	289	9.1	New
Liberal Democrats	Richard Howard	182	5.7	▼2.8
Taking the Initiative	Michael Pusey MBE	89	2.8	▼4.5
Independent	Jose Joseph	23	0.7	New
TUSC	Ben Goldstone	15	0.5	New
Turnout				
Rejected ballots				
Registered electors				

=== Norbury Park ===
Norbury Park
Party	Candidate	Votes	%	±%
Labour Co-op	Rowenna Davis	1,098	36.1	▼10.9
Conservative	Jason Perry	740	24.3	▼5.4
Green	Peter Underwood	684	22.5	▲17.6
Reform	Ben Flook	232	7.6	New
Liberal Democrats	Richard Howard	177	5.8	▼2.3
Taking the Initiative	Michael Pusey MBE	80	2.6	▼3.1
TUSC	Ben Goldstone	17	0.6	New
Independent	Jose Joseph	14	0.5	New
Turnout				
Rejected ballots				
Registered electors				

=== Old Coulsdon ===
Old Coulsdon
Party	Candidate	Votes	%	±%
Conservative	Jason Perry	1,700	42.4	▼11.6
Liberal Democrats	Richard Howard	711	17.7	▼7.9
Reform	Ben Flook	710	17.7	New
Labour Co-op	Rowenna Davis	479	11.9	▲3.1
Green	Peter Underwood	340	8.5	▲4.8
Taking the Initiative	Michael Pusey MBE	46	1.1	▼1.0
Independent	Jose Joseph	20	0.5	New
TUSC	Ben Goldstone	4	0.1	New
Turnout				
Rejected ballots				
Registered electors				

=== Park Hill & Whitgift ===
Park Hill & Whitgift
Party	Candidate	Votes	%	±%
Conservative	Jason Perry	900	43.9	▲11.1
Labour Co-op	Rowenna Davis	511	25.0	▼4.1
Green	Peter Underwood	277	13.5	▲6.9
Reform	Ben Flook	193	9.4	New
Liberal Democrats	Richard Howard	107	5.2	▼4.6
Independent	Jose Joseph	36	1.8	New
Taking the Initiative	Michael Pusey MBE	22	1.1	▼5.4
TUSC	Ben Goldstone	2	0.1	New
Turnout				
Rejected ballots				
Registered electors				

=== Purley & Woodcote ===
Purley & Woodcote
Party	Candidate	Votes	%	±%
Conservative	Jason Perry	2,962	51.2	▼5.1
Labour Co-op	Rowenna Davis	966	16.7	▲1.5
Green	Peter Underwood	787	13.6	▲8.7
Reform	Ben Flook	569	9.8	New
Liberal Democrats	Richard Howard	357	6.2	▼5.0
Taking the Initiative	Michael Pusey MBE	91	1.6	▼2.8
Independent	Jose Joseph	48	0.8	New
TUSC	Ben Goldstone	8	0.1	New
Turnout				
Rejected ballots				
Registered electors				

=== Purley Oaks & Riddlesdown ===
Purley Oaks & Riddlesdown
Party	Candidate	Votes	%	±%
Conservative	Jason Perry	1,709	44.3	▼4.4
Labour Co-op	Rowenna Davis	889	23.0	▲5.9
Green	Peter Underwood	569	14.7	▲8.4
Reform	Ben Flook	364	9.4	New
Liberal Democrats	Richard Howard	204	5.3	▼6.0
Taking the Initiative	Michael Pusey MBE	71	1.8	▼2.9
Independent	Jose Joseph	41	1.1	New
TUSC	Ben Goldstone	11	0.3	New
Turnout				
Rejected ballots				
Registered electors				

=== Sanderstead ===
Sanderstead
Party	Candidate	Votes	%	±%
Conservative	Jason Perry	3,786	57.6	▼4.8
Labour Co-op	Rowenna Davis	996	15.2	▲3.6
Reform	Ben Flook	732	11.1	New
Green	Peter Underwood	576	8.8	▲4.1
Liberal Democrats	Richard Howard	350	5.3	▼4.5
Taking the Initiative	Michael Pusey MBE	78	1.2	▼2.1
Independent	Jose Joseph	38	0.6	New
TUSC	Ben Goldstone	12	0.2	New
Turnout				
Rejected ballots				
Registered electors				

=== Selhurst ===
Selhurst
Party	Candidate	Votes	%	±%
Labour Co-op	Rowenna Davis	1,248	47.0	▼5.7
Green	Peter Underwood	523	19.7	▲13.3
Conservative	Jason Perry	332	12.5	▼2.6
Reform	Ben Flook	257	9.7	New
Liberal Democrats	Richard Howard	136	5.1	▼2.9
Taking the Initiative	Michael Pusey MBE	79	3.0	▼6.9
Independent	Jose Joseph	65	2.4	New
TUSC	Ben Goldstone	16	0.6	New
Turnout				
Rejected ballots				
Registered electors				

=== Selsdon & Addington Village ===
Selsdon & Addington Village
Party	Candidate	Votes	%	±%
Conservative	Jason Perry	1,696	43.7	▼6.1
Labour Co-op	Rowenna Davis	713	18.4	▲1.2
Reform	Ben Flook	655	16.9	New
Green	Peter Underwood	489	12.6	▲6.9
Liberal Democrats	Richard Howard	195	5.0	▼3.2
Taking the Initiative	Michael Pusey MBE	80	2.1	▼3.1
Independent	Jose Joseph	44	1.1	New
TUSC	Ben Goldstone	7	0.2	New
Turnout				
Rejected ballots				
Registered electors				

=== Selsdon Vale & Forestdale ===
Selsdon Vale & Forestdale
Party	Candidate	Votes	%	±%
Conservative	Jason Perry	1,477	41.5	▼11.9
Reform	Ben Flook	710	20.0	New
Green	Peter Underwood	612	17.2	▲12.4
Labour Co-op	Rowenna Davis	534	15.0	▲0.8
Liberal Democrats	Richard Howard	150	4.2	▼4.0
Taking the Initiative	Michael Pusey MBE	38	1.1	▼4.3
Independent	Jose Joseph	28	0.8	New
TUSC	Ben Goldstone	9	0.3	New
Turnout				
Rejected ballots				
Registered electors				

=== Shirley North ===
Shirley North
Party	Candidate	Votes	%	±%
Conservative	Jason Perry	1,843	35.7	▼6.8
Labour Co-op	Rowenna Davis	1,182	22.9	▼2.4
Reform	Ben Flook	1,029	20.0	New
Green	Peter Underwood	630	12.2	▲7.7
Liberal Democrats	Richard Howard	297	5.8	▼3.6
Taking the Initiative	Michael Pusey MBE	103	2.0	▼3.5
Independent	Jose Joseph	53	1.0	New
TUSC	Ben Goldstone	19	0.4	New
Turnout				
Rejected ballots				
Registered electors				

=== Shirley South ===
Shirley South
Party	Candidate	Votes	%	±%
Conservative	Jason Perry	1,608	40.1	▼0.8
Labour Co-op	Rowenna Davis	836	20.9	▼5.2
Reform	Ben Flook	743	18.5	New
Green	Peter Underwood	493	12.3	▲7.9
Liberal Democrats	Richard Howard	211	5.3	▼2.0
Taking the Initiative	Michael Pusey MBE	71	1.8	▼3.1
Independent	Jose Joseph	30	0.7	New
TUSC	Ben Goldstone	14	0.3	New
Turnout				
Rejected ballots				
Registered electors				

=== South Croydon ===
South Croydon
Party	Candidate	Votes	%	±%
Conservative	Jason Perry	1,954	34.9	▼1.2
Labour Co-op	Rowenna Davis	1,782	31.8	▲3.2
Green	Peter Underwood	850	15.2	▲8.4
Reform	Ben Flook	490	8.8	New
Liberal Democrats	Richard Howard	337	6.0	▼4.6
Taking the Initiative	Michael Pusey MBE	89	1.6	▼4.1
Independent	Jose Joseph	72	1.3	New
TUSC	Ben Goldstone	25	0.4	New
Turnout				
Rejected ballots				
Registered electors				

=== South Norwood ===
South Norwood
Party	Candidate	Votes	%	±%
Labour Co-op	Rowenna Davis	1,590	38.6	▼7.1
Green	Peter Underwood	1,117	27.1	▲18.9
Conservative	Jason Perry	529	12.8	▼1.2
Reform	Ben Flook	360	8.7	New
Liberal Democrats	Richard Howard	170	4.1	▼4.9
Taking the Initiative	Michael Pusey MBE	297	7.2	▼8.3
Independent	Jose Joseph	31	0.8	New
TUSC	Ben Goldstone	27	0.7	New
Turnout				
Rejected ballots				
Registered electors				

=== Thornton Heath ===
Thornton Heath
Party	Candidate	Votes	%	±%
Labour Co-op	Rowenna Davis	1,934	43.5	▼8.7
Green	Peter Underwood	992	22.3	▲14.7
Conservative	Jason Perry	604	13.6	0.0
Reform	Ben Flook	366	8.2	New
Liberal Democrats	Richard Howard	273	6.1	▼3.3
Taking the Initiative	Michael Pusey MBE	187	4.2	▼4.9
Independent	Jose Joseph	52	1.2	New
TUSC	Ben Goldstone	40	0.9	New
Turnout				
Rejected ballots				
Registered electors				

=== Waddon ===
Waddon
Party	Candidate	Votes	%	±%
Labour Co-op	Rowenna Davis	1,848	38.0	▲3.3
Conservative	Jason Perry	1,291	26.5	▼4.1
Green	Peter Underwood	732	15.0	▲9.1
Reform	Ben Flook	603	12.4	New
Liberal Democrats	Richard Howard	202	4.1	▼3.0
Independent	Jose Joseph	98	2.0	New
Taking the Initiative	Michael Pusey MBE	82	1.7	▼4.4
TUSC	Ben Goldstone	13	0.3	New
Turnout				
Rejected ballots				
Registered electors				

=== West Thornton ===
West Thornton
Party	Candidate	Votes	%	±%
Labour Co-op	Rowenna Davis	1,755	40.3	▼15.1
Conservative	Jason Perry	860	19.7	▼1.4
Green	Peter Underwood	634	14.5	▲10.7
Liberal Democrats	Richard Howard	453	10.4	▲4.4
Reform	Ben Flook	439	10.1	New
Taking the Initiative	Michael Pusey MBE	103	2.4	▼3.9
Independent	Jose Joseph	98	2.2	New
TUSC	Ben Goldstone	16	0.4	New
Turnout				
Rejected ballots				
Registered electors				

=== Woodside ===
Woodside
Party	Candidate	Votes	%	±%
Labour Co-op	Rowenna Davis	1,955	41.3	▼8.3
Green	Peter Underwood	1,071	22.6	▲15.2
Conservative	Jason Perry	678	14.3	▼2.2
Reform	Ben Flook	445	9.4	New
Liberal Democrats	Richard Howard	259	5.5	▼4.1
Taking the Initiative	Michael Pusey MBE	255	5.4	▼4.0
Independent	Jose Joseph	43	0.9	New
TUSC	Ben Goldstone	30	0.6	New
Turnout				
Rejected ballots				
Registered electors				
