= Coulsdon Town (ward) =

Ward in the London Borough of Croydon, England

Coordinates: 51.323°N 0.137°W

- ward for Croydon Council
- Boundary of Coulsdon Town in Croydon from 2018.
- County: Greater London

Current ward
- Created: 2018
- Councillor: Ian Parker (Conservative)
- Councillor: Nikhil Sherine Thampi (Conservative)
- Councillor: Luke Shortland (Conservative)
- Number of councillors: Three
- Created from: Coulsdon West
- UK Parliament constituency: Croydon South

Coulsdon Town is a ward in the London Borough of Croydon, covering part of the Coulsdon area of London in the United Kingdom. The ward currently forms part of Chris Philp MP's Croydon South constituency. The ward largely replaced the Coulsdon West ward following boundary changes for the 2018 election.

== List of Councillors ==
Election	Councillor	Party	Councillor	Party	Councillor	Party
2018	Ward created					
2018	Luke Clancy	Conservative	Mario Creatura	Conservative	Ian Parker	Conservative
2022	Luke Shortland	Conservative	Mario Creatura	Conservative	Ian Parker	Conservative
2026	Luke Shortland	Conservative	Nikhil Sherine Thampi	Conservative	Ian Parker	Conservative

== Mayoral elections ==
Below are the results for the candidate which received the highest share of the popular vote in the ward at each mayoral election.

Year	Mayoralty	Mayoral candidate	Party	Winner?
2021	Mayor of London	Shaun Bailey	Conservative	✗
2022	Mayor of Croydon	Jason Perry	Conservative	✓
2026	Mayor of Croydon	Jason Perry	Conservative	✓

== Ward results ==
=== Coulsdon Town ===
Croydon Council Election 2026: Coulsdon Town
Party	Candidate	Votes	%	±%
Conservative	Nikhil Sherine Thampi	2,105	13.1	
Conservative	Ian Parker	2,098	13.0	−5.0
Conservative	Luke Shortland	2,016	12.5	−3.9
Green	Ian Gillespie	974	6.1	
Reform	Anna Hills	959	6.0	
Reform	Richard Mallett	926	5.8	
Green	Jay Ginn	911	5.7	+3.3
Labour	Coral Carroll	871	5.4	
Reform	Jeff Wood	849	5.3	
Green	Dalijeet Singh	836	5.2	
Labour	Robert Barber	786	4.9	
Liberal Democrats	Richard Howard	764	4.8	
Liberal Democrats	Adrian Glendinning	691	4.3	
Labour	Steven Jack	634	3.9	
Liberal Democrats	Jason Reynolds	631	3.9	
Turnout		5,619	48.80	+9.47
Conservative hold		Swing		
Conservative hold		Swing		
Conservative hold		Swing		

Croydon Council Election 2022: Coulsdon Town (3)
Party	Candidate	Votes	%	±%
Conservative	Ian Parker*	2,215	18.0	
Conservative	Mario Creatura*	2,141	17.4	
Conservative	Luke Shortland	2,013	16.4	
Liberal Democrats	Ashley Burridge	965	7.8	
Liberal Democrats	Andy Sparkes	890	7.2	
Labour	Stephen Black	861	7.0	
Labour	Yasmin Dubash	699	5.7	
Liberal Democrats	Frances Conn	690	5.6	
Labour	Femi Yusoof	657	5.3	
Green	Lucy Farndon	517	4.2	
Green	Clive Farndon	348	2.8	
Green	Jay Ginn	300	2.4	
Turnout		4,394	39.33	
Conservative hold		Swing		
Conservative hold		Swing		
Conservative hold		Swing		

Croydon Council Election 2018: Coulsdon Town (3)
Party	Candidate	Votes	%	±%
Conservative	Luke Clancy *	2,320	19.9	
Conservative	Mario Creatura *	2,265	19.5	
Conservative	Ian Parker	2,264	19.5	
Labour	Stephen Robert Black	1,047	9.0	
Labour	Charlie King	1,030	8.8	
Labour	Ellily Ponnuthurai	833	3.7	
Liberal Democrats	Josh Viggiani	437	3.7	
Green	Lucy Farndon	399	3.4	
Liberal Democrats	Adrian Glendinning	288	2.4	
Liberal Democrats	Anna Wheeldon Jones	285	2.4	
Green	Jay Ginn	235	2.0	
Green	Leo Hopkins	201	1.7	
Majority		1,217	10.4	
Turnout				
Conservative hold		Swing		
Conservative hold		Swing		
Conservative hold		Swing		
