= Selhurst (ward) =

- ward for Croydon Council
- Boundary of Selhurst in Croydon from 2018.
- County: Greater London

Current ward
- Created: 2002
- Councillor: Catherine Wilson (Labour)
- Councillor: Mohammad Islam (Labour)
- Number of councillors: Two (2018-Present), Three (2002-2018)
- Created from: Whitehorse Manor
- UK Parliament constituency: Croydon West

Selhurst is a ward in the London Borough of Croydon. The ward had 3 councillors between 2002 and 2018, but from May 3, 2018, the ward has been reduced in size, and reduced to two councillors.

== List of Councillors ==
Election	Councillor	Party	Councillor	Party	Councillor	Party
2002	Ward created					
2002	Toni Letts	Labour	Nuala O'Neill	Labour	Gerry Ryan	Labour
2006	Toni Letts	Labour	Timothy Godfrey	Labour	Gerry Ryan	Labour
2015	Toni Letts	Labour	Timothy Godfrey	Labour	David Wood	Labour
2018	Toni Letts	Labour	2 Councillors; 2018-present		David Wood	Labour
2022	Catherine Wilson	Labour	2 Councillors; 2018-present		Mohammad Islam	Labour

== Mayoral election results ==
Below are the results for the candidate which received the highest share of the popular vote in the ward at each mayoral election.

Year	Mayoralty	Mayoral candidate	Party	Winner?
2004	Mayor of London	Ken Livingstone	Labour	✓
2008	Mayor of London	Ken Livingstone	Labour	✗
2012	Mayor of London	Ken Livingstone	Labour	✗
2016	Mayor of London	Sadiq Khan	Labour	✓
2021	Mayor of London	Sadiq Khan	Labour	✓
2022	Mayor of Croydon	Val Shawcross	Labour	✗
2026	Mayor of Croydon	Rowenna Davis	Labour	✗

== Ward Results ==
Croydon Council Election 2022: Selhurst (2)
Party	Candidate	Votes	%	±%
Labour	Catherine Wilson	1,026		
Labour	Mohammad Islam	997		
Conservative	Ian Stuart	341		
Conservative	Shakera Bowen	333		
Green	Catherine Graham	291		
Green	Alexander Cox	254		
Liberal Democrats	Daniel Houghton	252		
Taking the Initiative	Amaya Emmanuel	178		
Taking the Initiative	Francesca Dill	164		
Turnout		2,200	26.08	
Labour hold		Swing		
Labour hold		Swing		

Croydon Council Election 2018: Selhurst (2)
Party	Candidate	Votes	%	±%
Labour	Toni Eva Letts	1,606	36.69	
Labour	David Wood	1,570	35.87	
Conservative	Sas Conradie	399	9.12	
Conservative	Sophie Hoar	347	7.93	
Green	Catherine Graham	266	6.08	
Green	Matthew Jerzy Lucas	189	4.32	
Majority		1,171	26.75	
Turnout				
Labour hold		Swing		
Labour hold		Swing		

Selhurst by-election, 5 March 2015
Party	Candidate	Votes	%	±%
Labour	David Wood	1,517		
Conservative	Tirena Hilary Gunter	246		
Green	Tracey Jo Hague	148		
UKIP	Annette Isadora Reid	147		
Liberal Democrats	Geoff Morley	65		
Majority		1,271		
Turnout		2,138	18.6	
Labour hold		Swing		

The by-election was triggered by the death of Councillor Gerry Ryan.

Croydon Council Election 2014: Selhurst (3)
Party	Candidate	Votes	%	±%
Labour	Timothy Godfrey	2,086		
Labour	Toni Letts	2,079		
Labour	Gerry Ryan	1,996		
Conservative	Madeleine Brundle	546		
Conservative	Richard Brundle	515		
UKIP	Marianne Bowness	504		
Conservative	Dominic Schofield	471		
UKIP	Jenefer Parke-Blair	396		
Green	Meike Benzler	341		
Green	Joanne Wittams	269		
Green	Megan Braid-Pittordou	267		
Liberal Democrats	Joanne Corbin	240		
Independent	Edward Wentworth-Shaw	128		
TUSC	Elenor Haven	88		
Communist	John Eden	77		
Majority				
Turnout				
Labour hold		Swing		
Labour hold		Swing		
Labour hold		Swing		

Croydon Council Election 2006: Selhurst (3)
Party	Candidate	Votes	%	±%
Labour	Timothy Godfrey	1,652		
Labour	Toni Letts	1,597		
Labour	Gerry Ryan	1,452		
Conservative	Margaret Bird	906		
Conservative	Audrey Terrey	893		
Conservative	William Proudfoot	861		
Green	Megan Braid-Pittordou	588		
Liberal Democrats	Lynn Roulstone	570		
Turnout		3,220	31.4%	
Registered electors		10,259		
Labour hold		Swing		
Labour hold		Swing		
Labour hold		Swing		

Croydon Council Election 2002: Selhurst (3)
Party	Candidate	Votes	%	±%
Labour	Toni E. Letts	1,685		
Labour	Nuala O’Neill	1,641		
Labour	Michael G. Ryan	1,535		
Conservative	Barbara Drake	597		
Conservative	Jane Parker	558		
Conservative	Helen S. Pollard	540		
Liberal Democrats	Mark A. Green	367		
Liberal Democrats	Pamela A. Hutcheson	335		
Liberal Democrats	Lynn H. Roulstone	332		
Majority				
Turnout				
Labour hold		Swing		
Labour hold		Swing		
Labour hold		Swing		
