= Selsdon Vale and Forestdale =

Electoral ward in the London borough of Croydon

- ward for Croydon Council
- Boundary of Selsdon Vale and Forestdale in Croydon from 2018.
- County: Greater London

Current ward
- Created: 2018
- Councillor: Andy Stranack (Conservative)
- Councillor: Jack Barwell (Conservative)
- Number of councillors: Two
- Created from: Selsdon and Ballards and Heathfield
- UK Parliament constituency: Croydon East

Selsdon Vale and Forestdale is a ward in the London Borough of Croydon. It was created from parts of Selsdon and Ballards and Heathfield wards. It was first used for the 2018 elections.

== List of Councillors ==
Election	Councillor	Party	Councillor	Party
2018	Ward created			
2018	Andy Stranack	Conservative	Stuart Millson	Conservative
2022	Andy Stranack	Conservative	Badsha Quadir	Conservative
2022 by-election	Andy Stranack	Conservative	Fatima Zaman	Conservative
2026	Andy Stranack	Conservative	Jack Barwell	Conservative

== Mayoral elections ==
Below are the results for the candidate which received the highest share of the popular vote in the ward at each mayoral election.

Year	Mayoralty	Mayoral candidate	Party	Winner?
2021	Mayor of London	Shaun Bailey	Conservative	✗
2022	Mayor of Croydon	Jason Perry	Conservative	✓
2026	Mayor of Croydon	Jason Perry	Conservative	✓

== Croydon council elections ==
=== 2022 by-election ===
The by-election took place on 3 November 2022, following the death of Badsha Quadir.

2022 Selsdon Vale and Forestdale by-election
Party	Candidate	Votes	%	±%
Conservative	Fatima Zaman	983	46.3	▼21.2
Green	Peter Underwood	530	24.9	▲8.8
Labour	Thomas Bowell	372	17.5	▲1.0
Independent	Andrew Pelling	168	7.9	New
Liberal Democrats	George Holland	72	3.4	New
Majority		453	21.4	▼44.2
Turnout		2,125	29.59	
Conservative hold		Swing		

=== 2022 election ===
The election took place on 5 May 2022.

2022 Croydon London Borough Council election: Selsdon Vale and Forestdale (2)
Party	Candidate	Votes	%	±%
Conservative	Andy Stranack	1,964	37.1	+ 4.1
Conservative	Badsha Quadir	1,502	28.4	− 4.1
Labour	Russell Whitehead	480	9.1	− 1.7
Green	Adrian Douglas	469	8.9	+ 5.1
Labour	Anwar Hossain	446	8.4	− 2.4
Green	Gary Kelly	425	8	+ 4.9
Turnout				
Conservative hold		Swing		
Conservative hold		Swing		

=== 2018 election ===
The election took place on 3 May 2018.

2018 Croydon London Borough Council election: Selsdon Vale and Forestdale (2)
Party	Candidate	Votes	%	±%
Conservative	Andy Stranack	1,982	33.06	
Conservative	Stuart Millson	1,950	32.53	
Labour	Peter Stephens	649	10.83	
Labour	Deirdre O'Connor	646	10.78	
Green	Bryony Morris	228	3.80	
Green	Adrian Douglas	186	3.10	
Liberal Democrats	Jean Semadeni	178	2.97	
UKIP	William Bailey	176	2.94	
Majority		1,301	21.70	
Turnout				
Conservative win (new seat)				
Conservative win (new seat)				
