= Fieldway (ward) =

Former ward of the London Borough of Croydon, England

Coordinates: 51.354°N 0.018°W

- Former electoral ward for the Croydon London Borough Council
- Fieldway ward boundaries from 2002 to 2018
- Borough: Croydon
- County: Greater London
- Population: 11,479 (2011)
- Electorate: 7,182 (2014)

Former electoral ward
- Created: 1978
- Abolished: 2018
- Councillors: 2
- Replaced by: New Addington North; New Addington South
- GSS code: E05000154

Fieldway was a ward in the London Borough of Croydon, covering part of the New Addington estate in London in the United Kingdom. The ward formed part of the Croydon Central constituency. The population of the ward at the 2011 Census was 11,479. The ward returned two councillors every four years to Croydon Council.

== 2002–2018 Croydon council elections ==
There was a revision of ward boundaries in Croydon in 2002.

=== 2014 election ===
The election took place on 22 May 2014.

2014 Croydon London Borough Council election: Fieldway
Party	Candidate	Votes	%	±%
Labour	Carole Bonner	1,132		
Labour	Simon Hall	1,104		
UKIP	William Eastoe	686		
Conservative	Michael Castle	471		
Conservative	Jayne Laville	314		
BNP	John Clarke	212		
BNP	David Clarke	210		
Green	Jack Groves	130		
Green	Eileen Gale	102		
Majority				
Turnout				
Labour hold		Swing		
Labour hold		Swing		

=== 2010 election ===
The election on 6 May 2010 took place on the same day as the United Kingdom general election.

2010 Croydon London Borough Council election; Fieldway
Party	Candidate	Votes	%	±%
Labour	Simon Hall	1,812		
Labour	Carole Bonner	1,085		
Conservative	Jayne Laville	1,085		
Conservative	Maria Pearson	924		
BNP	John Clarke	583		
Liberal Democrats	Stephen Dering	453		
BNP	Rowena Savage	400		
Green	Eileen Gale	114		
Green	Mick Holloway	101		
Turnout		3,859	55.7%	
Registered electors		6,933		
Labour hold		Swing		
Labour hold		Swing		

=== 2006 election ===
The election took place on 4 May 2006.

2006 Croydon London Borough Council election: Fieldway
Party	Candidate	Votes	%	±%
Labour	Simon Hall	949	35.1	
Labour	Carole Bonner	862		
BNP	Matthew Bedford	692	25.6	
Conservative	Roland Petit	667	24.7	
Conservative	Andrew Stranack	477		
UKIP	Lynnda Robson	213	7.9	
Liberal Democrats	Heather Jefkins	180	6.7	
Turnout		2,293	34.2	
Registered electors		6,697		
Labour hold		Swing		
Labour hold		Swing		

=== 2002 election ===
The election took place on 2 May 2002.

2002 Croydon London Borough Council election: Fieldway
Party	Candidate	Votes	%	±%
Labour Co-op	James Walker	1,007		
Labour Co-op	Mary Walker	934		
Conservative	George Cowling	529		
Conservative	Joy Hamblett	497		
Majority				
Turnout				
Labour Co-op win (new boundaries)				
Labour Co-op win (new boundaries)				

== 1978–2002 Croydon council elections ==
Fieldway ward boundaries from 1978 to 2002

=== 1998 election ===
The election took place on 7 May 1998.

1998 Croydon London Borough Council election: Fieldway
Party	Candidate	Votes	%	±%
Labour Co-op	James Walker	851		
Labour Co-op	Mary Walker	819		
Conservative	Madeleine Brundle	294		
Conservative	Richard Brundle	281		
Majority				
Turnout				
Registered electors				
Labour hold		Swing		
Labour hold		Swing		

=== 1994 election ===
The election took place on 5 May 1994.

1994 Croydon London Borough Council election: Fieldway
Party	Candidate	Votes	%	±%
Labour Co-op	James Walker	1,508		
Labour Co-op	Mary Walker	1,411		
Conservative	John Miller	486		
Conservative	Dinah Matthews	433		
Majority		925		
Turnout				
Registered electors				
Labour Co-op hold		Swing		
Labour Co-op hold		Swing		

=== 1990 election ===
The election took place on 3 May 1990.

1990 Croydon London Borough Council election: Fieldway
Party	Candidate	Votes	%	±%
Labour Co-op	James Walker	1,558	73.57	
Labour Co-op	Mary Walker	1,397		
Conservative	John Miller	564	26.43	
Conservative	Roy Miller	498		
Registered electors		6,293		
Turnout		2221	35.29	
Rejected ballots		9	0.41	
Labour Co-op hold				
Labour Co-op hold				

=== 1986 election ===
The election took place on 8 May 1986.

1986 Croydon London Borough Council election: Fieldway
Party	Candidate	Votes	%	±%
Labour Co-op	James Walker	1,450		
Labour Co-op	Mary Walker	1,296		
Conservative	John Miller	416		
Conservative	Roy Miller	390		
Alliance	Philip Harvey	222		
Alliance	Clare Boyle	213		
Majority		880		
Turnout				
Registered electors				
Labour Co-op hold		Swing		
Labour Co-op hold		Swing		

=== 1982 election ===
The election took place on 6 May 1982.

1982 Croydon London Borough Council election: Fieldway
Party	Candidate	Votes	%	±%
Labour Co-op	James Walker	1,144		
Labour Co-op	Mary Walker	904		
Conservative	Roy Miller	433		
Liberal	Yvette Luff	409		
SDP	David Partridge	381		
Conservative	Adrian Goodenough	323		
Turnout				
Labour Co-op hold		Swing		
Labour Co-op hold		Swing		

=== 1978 election ===
The election took place on 4 May 1978.

1978 Croydon London Borough Council election: Fieldway
Party	Candidate	Votes	%	±%
Labour Co-op	David White	1,279		
Labour Co-op	Mary Walker	1,264		
Conservative	Roy Miller	581		
Conservative	Richard Gayler	558		
Majority		683		
Turnout				
Registered electors				
Labour Co-op win (new seat)				
Labour Co-op win (new seat)				
