= Crystal Palace and Upper Norwood =

Ward in Croydon

Crystal Palace & Upper Norwood
- ward for Croydon Council
- Boundary of Crystal Palace & Upper Norwood in Croydon from 2018.
- County: Greater London

Current ward
- Created: 2018
- Councillor: Patsy Cummings (Labour)
- Councillor: Nina Degrads (Labour)
- Councillor: Claire Bonham (Liberal Democrats)
- Number of councillors: Three
- Created from: Upper Norwood and South Norwood
- UK Parliament constituency: Streatham and Croydon North

Crystal Palace & Upper Norwood is a ward electing 3 councillors in the London Borough of Croydon. The ward came into existence on 3 May 2018.

== List of Councillors ==
Election	Councillor	Party	Councillor	Party	Councillor	Party
2018	Ward created					
2018	Pat Ryan	Labour	Nina Degrads	Labour	Stephen Mann	Labour
2022	Patsy Cummings	Labour	Nina Degrads	Labour	Claire Bonham	Liberal Democrats
2026	Natalie Vesty	Green	Mark Adderley	Green	Claire Bonham	Liberal Democrats

== Mayoral election results ==
Below are the results for the candidate which received the highest share of the popular vote in the ward at each mayoral election.

Year	Mayoralty	Mayoral candidate	Party	Winner?
2021	Mayor of London	Sadiq Khan	Labour	✓
2022	Mayor of Croydon	Val Shawcross	Labour	✗
2026	Mayor of Croydon	Rowenna Davis	Labour	✗

== Ward results ==
Croydon Council Election 2026: Crystal Palace & Upper Norwood
Party	Candidate	Votes	%	±%
Liberal Democrats	Claire Bonham	2,146	37.2	−0.3
Green	Natalie Vesty	1,833	31.7	
Green	Mark Adderley	1,784	30.9	
Green	Liam Shipton	1,544	26.7	
Labour Co-op	Sangeeta Gobidaas	1,504	26.0	
Labour Co-op	Will Linsdell	1,410	24.4	
Liberal Democrats	Nigel Dingley	1,349	23.4	
Liberal Democrats	Yusuf Osman	1,251	21.7	
Labour Co-op	Magnus Sorensen	1,162	20.1	
Reform	Ken Coales	492	8.5	
Reform	Sue Millward	436	7.5	
Reform	Sajan Xavier	355	6.1	
Conservative	Desmond Wright	318	5.5	
Conservative	Phillip Marques	315	5.5	
Conservative	Fereshteh Emami	283	4.9	
Turnout		5,775	46.87	+8.95
Liberal Democrats hold		Swing		
Green gain from Labour		Swing		
Green gain from Labour		Swing		

Croydon Council Election 2022: Crystal Palace & Upper Norwood (3)
Party	Candidate	Votes	%	±%
Labour	Patsy Cummings†	1,753	13.35	−4.40
Labour	Nina de Grads	1,671	12.73	−4.88
Liberal Democrats	Claire Bonham	1,641	12.50	+5.64
Labour	Christine Spooner	1,531	11.66	−4.73
Liberal Democrats	Steven Penketh	1,259	9.59	+4.01
Liberal Democrats	Costel Petre	1,115	8.49	+3.95
Green	Rachel Chance	946	7.21	+1.99
Green	Tom Chance	698	5.32	+1.63
Green	Marcus Boyle	660	5.03	+1.66
Conservative	Don Charles-Lambert	633	4.82	−1.24
Conservative	Janet Wilkinson	616	4.69	−1.33
Conservative	Gemma Patient	605	4.61	−1.51
Turnout		4,665	37.92	
Labour hold		Swing		
Labour hold		Swing		
Liberal Democrats gain from Labour		Swing		

Croydon Council Election 2018: Crystal Palace & Upper Norwood (3)
Party	Candidate	Votes	%	±%
Labour	Pat Ryan	2,399	17.75	
Labour	Nina Violet Degrads	2,380	17.61	
Labour	Stephen James Mann	2,215	16.39	
Liberal Democrats	Claire Bonham	927	6.86	
Conservative	Gemma Marie Patient	827	6.12	
Conservative	Andy Phillips	819	6.06	
Conservative	Dan Edwardson	813	6.02	
Liberal Democrats	Guy Burchett	754	5.58	
Green	Rachel Mary Chance	706	5.22	
Liberal Democrats	Chris Jordan	614	4.54	
Green	Tom Chance	499	3.69	
Green	Michael O'Sullivan	456	3.37	
Independent	Andrew Rothschild	107	0.79	
Majority		1,288	9.53	
Turnout				
Labour hold		Swing		
Labour hold		Swing		
Labour hold		Swing		
