= Hutchinson's Bank =

Nature reserve in Croydon, England

Coordinates: 51.338°N 0.0197°W

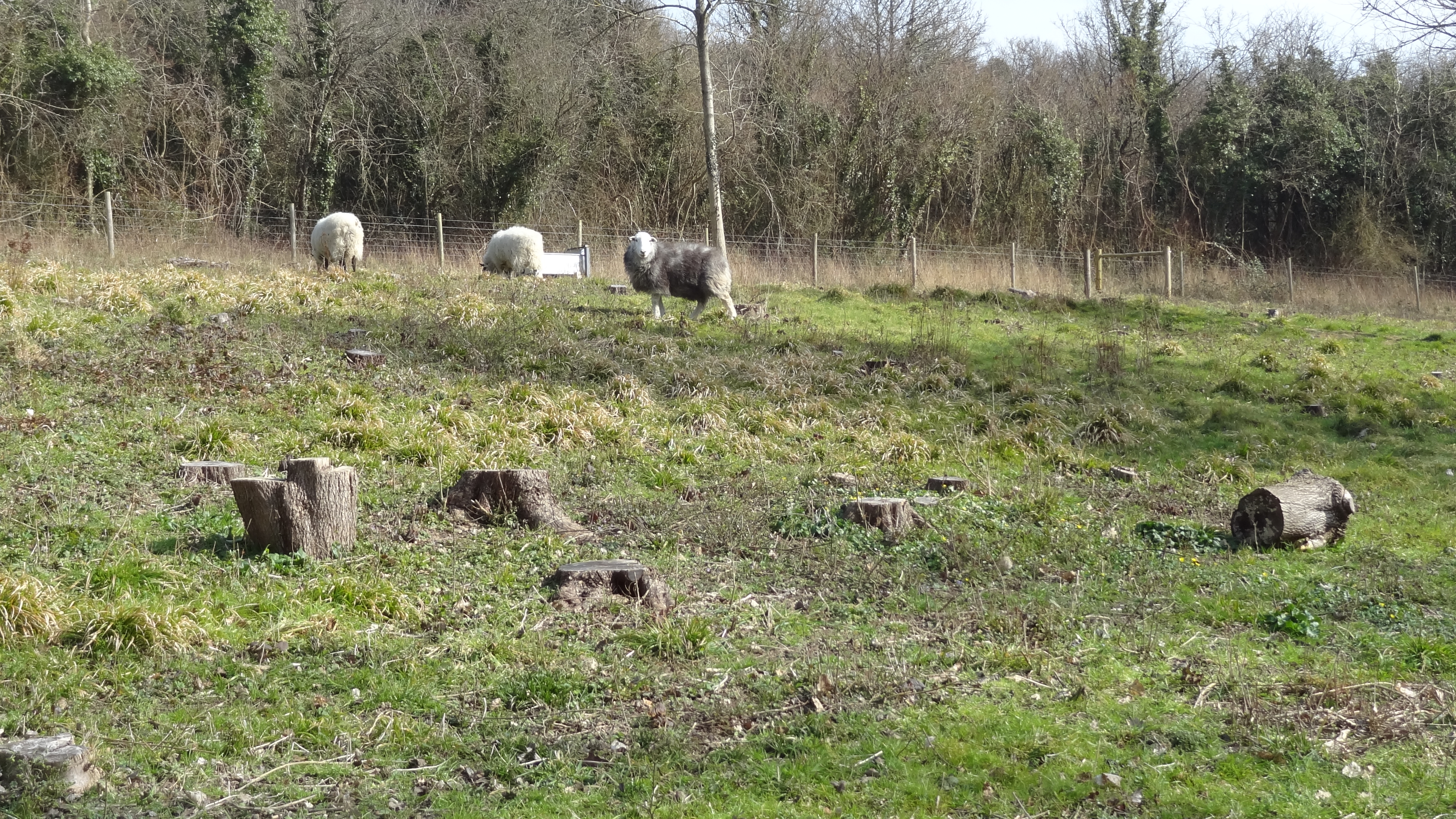
Sheep graze on Hutchinson's Bank

Hutchinson's Bank is 21.8 hectare Local Nature Reserve and Site of Metropolitan Importance for Nature Conservation in New Addington in the London Borough of Croydon. It is owned by Croydon Council and managed by London Wildlife Trust.

The site is a sloping dry chalk bank, which has a wide variety of plants, butterflies and birds. Plants include the pyramidal and man orchids, and the greater yellow-rattle, which is rare nationally. Over 100 species of moth and 36 of butterfly have been recorded. It also has scrub with wild privet, dogwood and the wayfaring tree. Sheep graze on the grassland as part of the Surrey Downs Project.

There is access from Featherbed Lane, Farleigh Dean Crescent and Thorpe Close.
