= New Addington South =

Electoral ward in the London Borough of Croydon, England

- ward for Croydon Council
- Boundary of New Addington South in Croydon from 2018.
- County: Greater London

Current ward
- Created: 2018
- Councillor: Scott Holman (Reform)
- Councillor: Adam Kellett (Reform)
- Number of councillors: Two
- Created from: New Addington
- UK Parliament constituency: Croydon East

New Addington South is a ward covering the older part of the New Addington Estate in the London Borough of Croydon. It largely replaced the former New Addington Ward, and entered into force on 3 May 2018.

== List of councillors ==
Election	Councillor	Party	Councillor	Party
2018	Ward created			
2018	Oliver Lewis	Labour	Louisa Woodley	Labour
2022	Tony Pearson	Conservative	Lara Fish	Conservative
2026	Scott Holman	Reform UK	Adam Kellett	Reform UK

== Mayoral elections ==
Below are the results for the candidate which received the highest share of the popular vote in the ward at each mayoral election.

Year	Mayoralty	Mayoral candidate	Party	Winner?
2021	Mayor of London	Shaun Bailey	Conservative	✗
2022	Mayor of Croydon	Jason Perry	Conservative	✓
2026	Mayor of Croydon	Ben Flook	Reform UK	✗

== Croydon council elections ==
=== 2026 election ===
The election took place on 7 May 2026.

2026 Croydon London Borough Council election: New Addington South
Party	Candidate	Votes	%	±%
Reform	Scott Holman	1,003	34.0	
Reform	Adam Kellett	857	29.0	
Conservative	Lara Leigh Fish	835	28.3	−20.3
Conservative	Tony Pearson	802	27.2	−23.9
Labour	Laila Mohamed	672	22.8	
Labour	Edwyn Wood	619	21.0	
Green	Alexandra Leech-Gribben	392	13.3	
Green	Samuel Stevens	346	11.7	
Taking the Initiative	Faustina Amoah	63	2.1	
Taking the Initiative	Ralph Pemberton	53	2.0	
Turnout		2,952	36.33	+9.51
Reform gain from Conservative		Swing		
Reform gain from Conservative		Swing		

=== 2022 election ===
The election took place on 5 May 2022.

2022 Croydon London Borough Council election: New Addington South (2)
Party	Candidate	Votes	%	±%
Conservative	Tony Pearson	953		
Conservative	Lara Fish	905		
Labour	Vicky Newton	840		
Labour	Ben Taylor	647		
Green	Nick Barnett	195		
Green	Hannah George	188		
Turnout		2,154	26.82	
Conservative gain from Labour		Swing		
Conservative gain from Labour		Swing		

=== 2018 election ===
The election took place on 3 May 2018.

2018 Croydon London Borough Council election: New Addington South (2)
Party	Candidate	Votes	%	±%
Labour	Oliver Lewis	1,306	50.2	
Labour	Louisa Woodley	1,156		
Conservative	Tony Pearson	984	39.5	
Conservative	Mark Johnson	949		
UKIP	Peter Staveley	172	5.1	
BNP	Dave Clarke	131	2.7	
Green	Martin Douglas	125	2.6	
UKIP	Michael Swadling	80		
Majority		172		
Turnout				
Labour win (new seat)				
Labour win (new seat)				
