= Selsdon and Addington Village =

Electoral ward in the London borough of Croydon

Selsdon & Addington Village
- ward for Croydon Council
- Boundary of Selsdon & Addington Village in Croydon from 2018.
- County: Greater London

Current ward
- Created: 2018
- Councillor: Joseph Lee (Conservative)
- Councillor: Robert Ward (Conservative)
- Number of councillors: Two
- Created from: Selsdon and Ballards and Heathfield
- UK Parliament constituency: Croydon East

Selsdon & Addington Village is a ward in the London Borough of Croydon, created from the former Selsdon and Ballards and Heathfield wards. The first election was on 3 May 2018.

== List of Councillors ==
Election	Councillor	Party	Councillor	Party
2018	Ward created			
2018	Helen Pollard	Conservative	Robert Ward	Conservative
2022	Joseph Lee	Conservative	Robert Ward	Conservative

== Mayoral elections ==
Below are the results for the candidate which received the highest share of the popular vote in the ward at each mayoral election.

Year	Mayoralty	Mayoral candidate	Party	Winner?
2021	Mayor of London	Shaun Bailey	Conservative	✗
2022	Mayor of Croydon	Jason Perry	Conservative	✓
2026	Mayor of Croydon	Jason Perry	Conservative	✓

== Ward Results ==
Croydon Council Election 2022: Selsdon & Addington Village (2)
Party	Candidate	Votes	%	±%
Conservative	Joseph Lee	1,771		
Conservative	Robert Ward*	1,695		
Labour	Angela Collins	649		
Liberal Democrats	Helen Lishmund	513		
Labour	Anthony Ellis	480		
Green	Bryony Bullock	360		
Green	Matt Bullock	263		
Liberal Democrats	Jean Semadeni	254		
Heritage	Zachary Stiling	45		
Turnout		3,327	41.69	
Conservative hold		Swing		
Conservative hold		Swing		

Croydon Council Election 2018: Selsdon & Addington Village (2)
Party	Candidate	Votes	%	±%
Conservative	Helen Susan Pollard	2,095	31.92	
Conservative	Robert Charles Ward	1,901	28.96	
Labour	Joyce Reid	917	13.97	
Labour	Kenneth Harley Towl	704	10.73	
Green	Peter Underwood	278	4.24	
Liberal Democrats	Helen Elizabeth Lishmund	271	4.13	
Green	Catherine Jean Shelley	229	3.49	
UKIP	Crispin Mark Hardy Williams	127	1.93	
BNP	Michael John Collard	42	0.64	
Majority		984	14.99	
Turnout				
Conservative hold		Swing		
Conservative hold		Swing		
