= Shirley North =

Ward in the London Borough of Croydon

- ward for Croydon Council
- Boundary of Shirley North in Croydon from 2018.
- County: Greater London

Current ward
- Created: 2018
- Councillor: Susan Bennett (Conservative)
- Councillor: Richard Chatterjee (Conservative)
- Councillor: Mark Johnson (Conservative)
- Number of councillors: Three
- Created from: Ashburton and Shirley
- UK Parliament constituency: Croydon East

Shirley North is a ward in the London Borough of Croydon. It was created from the eastern half of Ashburton ward, and the area north of Wickham Road in Shirley ward. The first election was on 3 May 2018.

== List of Councillors ==
Election	Councillor	Party	Councillor	Party	Councillor	Party
2018	Ward created					
2018	Susan Bennett	Conservative	Richard Chatterjee	Conservative	Gareth Streeter	Conservative
2022	Susan Bennett	Conservative	Richard Chatterjee	Conservative	Mark Johnson	Conservative

== Mayoral elections ==
Below are the results for the candidate which received the highest share of the popular vote in the ward at each mayoral election.

Year	Mayoralty	Mayoral candidate	Party	Winner?
2021	Mayor of London	Shaun Bailey	Conservative	✗
2022	Mayor of Croydon	Jason Perry	Conservative	✓
2026	Mayor of Croydon	Jason Perry	Conservative	✓

== Ward Results ==
Croydon Council Election 2022: Shirley North (3)
Party	Candidate	Votes	%	±%
Conservative	Sue Bennett*	2,069		
Conservative	Richard Chatterjee*	1,911		
Conservative	Mark Johnson	1,810		
Labour	Mark Henson	1,165		
Labour	Nuala O'Neill	1,027		
Labour	Peter Spalding	931		
Liberal Democrats	Sarah Harrison	616		
Green	Caroline Osland	422		
Green	Joseph Elliott-Coleman	403		
Liberal Democrats	Lawrence Sereda	401		
Liberal Democrats	Kaashif Hymabaccus	315		
Green	Christopher Sciberras	274		
Turnout		4,152	35.38	
Conservative hold		Swing		
Conservative hold		Swing		
Conservative hold		Swing		

Croydon Council Election 2018: Shirley North (3)
Party	Candidate	Votes	%	±%
Conservative	Susan Bennett*	2,748	19.23	
Conservative	Richard Chatterjee*	2,683	18.78	
Conservative	Gareth Streeter	2,454	17.17	
Labour	Mark David Henson	1,900	13.30	
Labour	Robert Edward Elliott	1,802	12.61	
Labour	Eunice O'Dame	1,705	11.93	
Green	Chris Sciberras	388	2.72	
Green	Frances Richardson Fearon	321	2.25	
Green	Sam Small	289	2.02	
Majority		554	3.88	
Turnout				
Conservative hold		Swing		
Conservative hold		Swing		
Conservative hold		Swing		
