= Shirley South =

- ward for Croydon Council
- Boundary of Shirley South in Croydon from 2018.
- County: Greater London

Current ward
- Created: 2018
- Councillor: Jason Cummings (Conservative)
- Councillor: Scott Roche (Conservative)
- Number of councillors: Two
- Created from: Shirley and Heathfield
- UK Parliament constituency: Croydon East

Shirley South is a ward in the London Borough of Croydon. It was created from parts of the old Shirley and Heathfield wards. The first election was on 3 May 2018.

== List of Councillors ==
Election	Councillor	Party	Councillor	Party
2018	Ward created			
2018	Jason Cummings	Conservative	Scott Roche	Conservative

== Mayoral elections ==
Below are the results for the candidate which received the highest share of the popular vote in the ward at each mayoral election.

Year	Mayoralty	Mayoral candidate	Party	Winner?
2021	Mayor of London	Shaun Bailey	Conservative	✗
2022	Mayor of Croydon	Jason Perry	Conservative	✓
2026	Mayor of Croydon	Jason Perry	Conservative	✓

== Ward Results ==
Croydon Council Election 2022: Shirley South (2)
Party	Candidate	Votes	%	±%
Conservative	Jason Cummings*	1,520		
Conservative	Scott Roche*	1,374		
Labour	Maggie Conway	806		
Labour	Safwan Chowdhury	682		
Green	Andy Bebington	480		
Green	Liz Bebington	445		
Liberal Democrats	Anna Ruse	296		
Liberal Democrats	Giacinto Palmieri	246		
Turnout		3,179	38.78	
Conservative hold		Swing		
Conservative hold		Swing		

Croydon Council Election 2018: Shirley South (2)
Party	Candidate	Votes	%	±%
Conservative	Jason James Cummings	1,869	27.27	
Conservative	Scott James Roche	1,766	25.77	
Labour	Marzia Nicodemi	1,150	16.78	
Labour	David John Percival	1,150	16.78	
Green	Liz Bebington	275	4.01	
Green	Andy Bebington	239	3.49	
Liberal Democrats	Christopher Anthony Adams	155	2.26	
UKIP	Kathleen Garner	143	2.09	
Liberal Democrats	Andrew John Thynne	106	1.55	
Majority		616	8.99	
Turnout				
Conservative hold		Swing		
Conservative hold		Swing		
