= New Addington (ward) =

Former electoral ward of London

- Former ward for Croydon Council
- County: Greater London

1965–2018
- Number of councillors: Three (1965-2002), Two (2002-2018)
- Replaced by: New Addington South

New Addington was a ward covering the older part of the New Addington Estate in the London Borough of Croydon. It was abolished on 3 May 2018 and largely replaced by New Addington South.
