= Mayor of Croydon =

Directly-elected mayor of Croydon

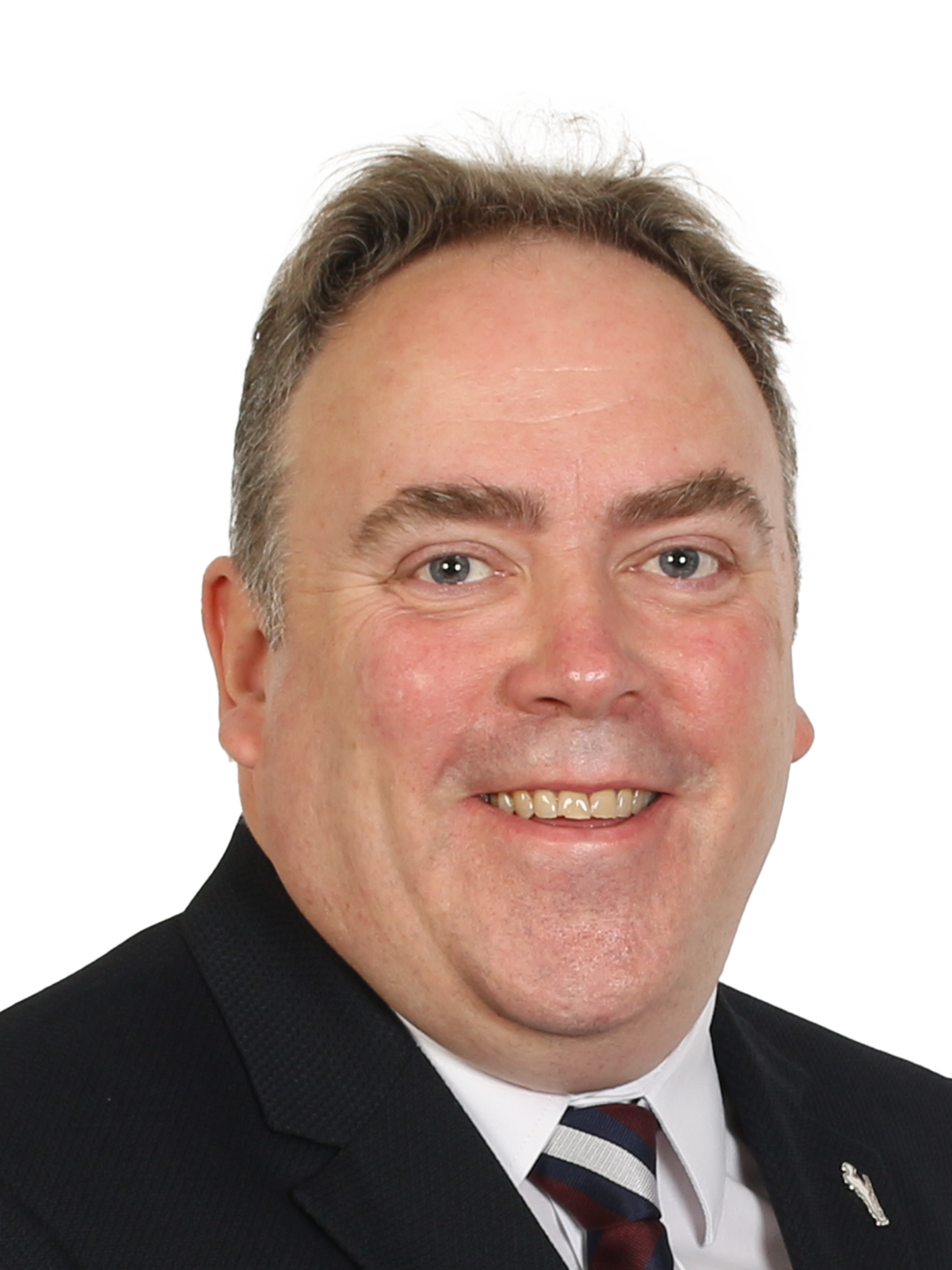
- Incumbent; Jason Perry since 9 May 2022
- Style: Mayor
- Appointer: Electorate of Croydon
- Term length: Four years
- Inaugural holder: Jason Perry
- Website: https://jasonperry.uk

The mayor of Croydon is a directly elected local authority mayor responsible for the executive function of Croydon London Borough Council. The current mayor is Jason Perry of the Conservative Party, elected in May 2022, and the first holder of the post.

== Background ==
The Local Government Act 2000 allowed local authorities to change from the leader-and-cabinet system of governance to a directly elected mayor model. The change needs to be established by a referendum, either arranged by the council or triggered by a petition. A campaign group supporting an elected mayor for Croydon called DEMOC started a petition to change to the mayoral system in February 2020, which they submitted to the council in September 2020. The mayoral system would replace the leader-and-cabinet system, whereby the leader of the council is chosen by the majority party or coalition of parties.

In January 2021, the council announced that a referendum would be held in October of that year. The government minister Luke Hall said that the council should hold the referendum in May 2021 instead, alongside elections for the Mayor of London and London Assembly. The Labour councillor Sean Fitzsimons defended the choice to hold the referendum in October, saying that the prospective mayor could then be elected alongside the council in May 2022. The council also cited technical limitations about how it could spend money under the terms of the council's section 114 notice which required Hall to amend the law to facilitate the referendum. The Conservatives, including the Conservative MP Chris Philp, campaigned in favour of an elected mayor. Labour opposed the mayoral system, including both Croydon Labour MPs. The Green Party also opposed the mayoral system, instead advocating a change to the committee system.

=== Referendum ===
The referendum question was "How would you like the London Borough of Croydon to be run?", with the options being "By a leader who is an elected councillor chosen by a vote of the other elected councillors. This is how the council is run now." or "By a mayor who is elected by voters. This would be a change from how the council is run now." The result of the referendum was a large majority in favour of the mayoral system, with more than 80% of valid votes being cast in favour of the change.

Croydon mayoral referendum 7 October 2021
Choice	Votes	%
Elected mayor	47,165	80.37
Cabinet system	11,519	19.63
Total	58,684	100.00
Registered voters/turnout		21

== Elections ==
=== 2022 ===
The Conservatives selected their council group leader Jason Perry to be their mayoral candidate in October 2021. Labour began their selection process in October 2021. The former deputy mayor of London Val Shawcross was selected as the Labour candidate in December 2021. The Green Party selected Peter Underwood as their candidate in November 2021. The businessperson Farah London, who stood as an independent candidate in the 2021 London mayoral election, was announced as the mayoral candidate for the Taking the Initiative Party.

Croydon Mayoral Election 5 May 2022
Party	Candidate	1st round		2nd round			1st round votesTransfer votes, 2nd round
Party	Candidate	Total	Of round	Transfers	Total	Of round	1st round votesTransfer votes, 2nd round
Conservative	Jason Perry	33,413	34.8%	5,199	38,612	50.4%	
Labour Co-op	Val Shawcross	31,352	32.7%	6,671	38,023	49.6%	
Liberal Democrats	Richard Howard	9,967	10.4%				
Independent	Andrew Pelling	6,807	7.1%				
Green	Peter Underwood	6,193	6.5%				
Taking the Initiative	Farah London	5,768	6.0%				
Independent	Winston McKenzie	1,324	1.4%				
Independent	Gavin Palmer	1,114	1.2%				
Turnout		95,938		Rejected ballots:			
Registered electors							
Conservative win							

== List of elected mayors ==
Political party	Name	Term of office & mandate		
Conservative	Jason Perry	9 May 2022	Incumbent	2022
Conservative	Jason Perry	9 May 2022	Incumbent	2026
Conservative	Jason Perry	4 years and 122 days		
