= 1998 Croydon London Borough Council election =

1998 local election in England

- 7 May 1998

All 70 seats up for election to Croydon London Borough Council 36 seats needed for a majority
- Registered: 223,588
- Turnout: 84,507, 37.80% (▼8.68)

	First party	Second party	Third party
Leader	Valerie Shawcross	Unknown	Unknown
Party	Labour	Conservative	Liberal Democrats
Leader since	Unknown	Unknown	Unknown
Leader's seat	New Addington	Unknown	Unknown
Last election	40 seats, 40.78%	30 seats, 42.80%	0 seats, 15.07%
Seats won	38	31	1
Seat change	▼2	▲1	▲1
Popular vote	80,529	97,228	23,635
Percentage	39.79	48.04%	11.68%
Swing	▼0.99	▲5.24	▼3.39
- Map of the results of the 1998 Croydon Council election. Conservatives in blue and Labour in red.
Council control before election
Labour
Council control after election
Labour

Elections to Croydon Council in London, England were held on 7 May 1998. The whole council was up for election and the Labour Party stayed in overall control of the council. For the first time in a local election two polling stations were situated in supermarkets.

Before the election the council had been seen as a top target for the Conservatives who only needed a small swing of 2 per cent to take control. The Labour party had taken control of the council for the first time in the council's history in the previous election in 1994. The removal of mounted patrols from parks and an increase in nursery places were seen as important issues in the election. Both main parties concentrated on trying to get their vote out and were targeting several key wards.

== Background ==
In the intervening years between the 1994 and 1998 elections there were a total of 4 by-elections, none of which resulted in a seat changing hands between parties.

In fact, this council was rare in that its composition hadn't changed in the 4 years between elections. As such, the composition of the council just before the election was as follows:

↓
40	30
Labour	Con

== Election result ==
Croydon local election result 1998
Party	Seats	Gains	Losses	Net gain/loss	Seats %	Votes %	Votes	+/−
Labour	38 (Note: The number of seats and number of votes includes results from candidates standing under the Labour and Co-operative party)	0	2	▼2	54.29	39.79	80,529	▼0.99
Conservative	31	2	1	▲1	44.29	48.04	97,228	▲5.24
Liberal Democrats	1	1	0	▲1	1.41	11.68	23,635	▼3.39
Independent Resident	0	0	0	Steady	0.00	0.30	600	New
Independent Green	0	0	0	Steady	0.00	0.13	273	New
Monster Raving Loony	0	0	0	Steady	0.00	0.06	114	New
Total	70						202,379	

↓
38	1	31
Labour	LD	Con

== Ward results ==
(*) - Indicates an incumbent candidate

(†) - Indicates an incumbent candidate standing in a different ward

=== Addiscombe ===
Addiscombe (3)
Party	Candidate	Votes	%	±%
Labour Co-op	Jeremy Fitzpatrick*	1,943	45.01	▲3.09
Labour Co-op	Amanda Campbell	1,703		
Labour Co-op	Sean Fitzsimons*	1,686		
Conservative	Richard Barwell	1,393	33.10	▲2.23
Conservative	Richard Chatterjee	1,306		
Conservative	Hella El-Drouble	1,222		
Independent Resident	Stephen Collins	533	13.50	New
Liberal Democrats	Melanie Barlow	391	8.39	▼3.57
Liberal Democrats	George Schlich	314		
Liberal Democrats	Kay Schlich	289		
Registered electors		9,411		▼804
Turnout		3,923	41.69	▼5.12
Rejected ballots		18	0.46	▲0.23
Labour Co-op hold				
Labour Co-op hold				
Labour Co-op hold				

=== Ashburton ===
Ashburton (2)
Party	Candidate	Votes	%	±%
Conservative	Edwin Arram*	1,417	50.58	▲7.83
Conservative	Avril Slipper*	1,355		
Labour	Michael Phelan	1,055	38.50	▲0.78
Labour	Neva Sequeira	1,055		
Liberal Democrats	Charles Ashworth	343	10.91	▼8.62
Liberal Democrats	Paul West	255		
Registered electors		6,327		▼205
Turnout		2,925	46.23	▼4.20
Rejected ballots		6	0.21	▲0.15
Conservative hold				
Conservative hold				

=== Bensham Manor ===
Bensham Manor (3)
Party	Candidate	Votes	%	±%
Labour	Alexander Burridge	1,766	62.25	▼5.29
Labour	Paula Shaw* (Note: Shaw was elected in a by-election triggered by the resignation of Cllr Alison Roberts in 1996)	1,697		
Labour	Paul Mee*	1,668		
Conservative	Brenda Pullen	645	22.50	▼9.96
Conservative	Sujata Bakrania	613		
Conservative	Maureen Whiting	596		
Liberal Democrats	John Fraser	336	10.70	New
Liberal Democrats	Peter Facey	252		
UK Independent	James Feisenberger	125	4.55	New
Registered electors		9,161		▼461
Turnout		2,975	32.47	▼12.93
Rejected ballots		21	0.71	▲0.23
Labour hold				
Labour hold				
Labour hold				

=== Beulah ===
Beulah (2)
Party	Candidate	Votes	%	±%
Labour	Roy Grantham*	1,368	50.00	▲3.83
Labour	Hugh Malyan* (Note: Maylan was elected in a by-electing triggered by the resignation of Cllr Sherwan Chowdbury in 1994)	1,330		
Conservative	Jonathan Bearman	1,131	41.10	▼0.77
Conservative	Gloria Hutchens	1,087		
Liberal Democrats	Jonathan Cope	240	8.90	▼3.06
Registered electors		6,050		▼294
Turnout		2,849	47.09	▼5.50
Rejected ballots		4	0.14	▼0.07
Labour hold				
Labour hold				

=== Broad Green ===
Broad Green (3)
Party	Candidate	Votes	%	±%
Labour	Rodney Matlock*	1,395	70.10	▼3.96
Labour	Stuart Collins*	1,331		
Labour	Peter Spalding*	1,253		
Conservative	Ian Parker	612	29.90	▲3.96
Conservative	Jill Thomas	553		
Conservative	Keith Pearson	532		
Registered electors		8,754		▼36
Turnout		2,259	25.81	▼12.32
Rejected ballots		27	1.20	▲0.72
Labour hold				
Labour hold				
Labour hold				

=== Coulsdon East ===
Coulsdon East (3)
Party	Candidate	Votes	%	±%
Conservative	Christopher Wright*	2,234	47.13	▼2.71
Liberal Democrats	Ian Atkins	2,122	43.27	▲7.96
Conservative	Jason Perry*	2,112		
Conservative	Brian Udell	2,106		
Liberal Democrats	Michael Bishopp	1,935		
Liberal Democrats	Mark Goodrich	1,867		
Labour	Maggie Conway	474	9.60	▼5.25
Labour	Charles King	431		
Labour	Michael Ryan	410		
Registered electors		9,368		▲35
Turnout		4,788	51.11	▲2.71
Rejected ballots		11	0.23	▲0.19
Conservative hold				
Liberal Democrats gain from Conservative				
Conservative hold				

=== Croham ===
Croham (3)
Party	Candidate	Votes	%	±%
Conservative	Nicholas Keable	2,223	55.03	▲3.25
Conservative	Paul McCombie	2,206		
Conservative	Mark Stockwell	2,127		
Labour	Alison Butler	1,060	25.61	▲6.27
Labour	Beatrice Pollard	1,011		
Labour	Peter Horah	980		
Liberal Democrats	Sylvia Bishopp	611	13.99	▼12.40
Liberal Democrats	Joan Leck	530		
Liberal Democrats	Geoffrey Gauge	526		
Independent	Graham Johnson	129	3.25	New
Independent	Mark Samuel	84	2.12	New
Registered electors		10,140		▲146
Turnout		4,052	39.96	▼10.62
Rejected ballots		13	0.32	▲0.24
Conservative hold				
Conservative hold				
Conservative hold				

=== Fairfield ===
Fairfield (3)
Party	Candidate	Votes	%	±%
Conservative	Robert Coatman*	2,189	52.20	▲3.05
Conservative	Patricia Knight	2,120		
Conservative	Michael Wunn*	2,034		
Labour	Dominic O’Donnell	1,390	32.79	▲3.08
Labour	Neil Jackson	1,335		
Labour	Paul Scott	1,260		
Liberal Democrats	Anthony Moss	556	12.20	▼3.25
Liberal Democrats	Mahetabel Hay-Davies	487		
Liberal Democrats	Carl Muller	439		
Monster Raving Loony	John Cartwright	114	2.81	New
Registered electors		11,470		▼196
Turnout		4,234	36.91	▼5.93
Rejected ballots		24	0.57	▲0.25
Conservative hold				
Conservative hold				
Conservative hold				

=== Fieldway ===
Fieldway (2)
Party	Candidate	Votes	%	±%
Labour Co-op	James Walker*	851	74.39	▼1.65
Labour Co-op	Mary Walker*	819		
Conservative	Madeleine Brundle	294	25.61	▲1.65
Conservative	Richard Brundle	281		
Registered electors		5,193		▼653
Turnout		1,243	23.94	▼12.19
Rejected ballots		11	0.88	▲0.55
Labour hold				
Labour hold				

=== Heathfield ===
Heathfield (3)
Party	Candidate	Votes	%	±%
Conservative	Andrew Pelling*	2,328	65.07	▼12.66
Conservative	Mary Horden*	2,284		
Conservative	Margaret Mead*	2,283		
Labour	Jeffrey Primm	880	22.78	▼2.34
Labour	Lydia Sookias	776		
Labour	Mohammed Aslam	758		
Liberal Democrats	Peter Ladanyi	429	12.15	▼4.65
Registered electors		8,991		▼205
Turnout		3,653	40.63	▼6.96
Rejected ballots		11	0.30	▲0.21
Conservative hold				
Conservative hold				
Conservative hold				

=== Kenley ===
Kenley (2)
Party	Candidate	Votes	%	±%
Conservative	Janice Buttinger	1,500	65.81	▲10.38
Conservative	Steven Hollands	1,445		
Labour	Julie Candy	465	19.35	▲2.57
Labour	Michael Rosenbloom	401		
Liberal Democrats	Jeremy Hargreaves	339	14.84	▼12.95
Liberal Democrats	Robert Beadle	325		
Registered electors		6,581		▼132
Turnout		2,388	36.29	▼7.98
Rejected ballots		4	0.17	▼0.12
Conservative hold				
Conservative hold				

=== Monks Orchard ===
Monks Orchard (2)
Party	Candidate	Votes	%	±%
Conservative	Peter Campbell*	2,132	65.92	▲5.99
Conservative	Derek Loughborough*	2,116		
Labour	David Davies	880	24.16	▲2.28
Labour	Joseph Assanah	677		
Liberal Democrats	David Golding	342	9.92	▼8.26
Liberal Democrats	Patricia West	297		
Registered electors		8,091		▲114
Turnout		3,450	42.64	▼8.46
Rejected ballots		9	0.26	▲0.01
Conservative hold				
Conservative hold				

=== New Addington ===
New Addington (3)
Party	Candidate	Votes	%	±%
Labour	Christopher Ward* (Note: Ward was elected in a by-election triggered by the resignation of Cllr Geraint Davies in 1997.)	1,076	61.66	▼8.82
Labour	Trevor Laffin*	1,023		
Labour	Val Shawcross*	981		
Conservative	John Miller	669	38.34	▲8.82
Conservative	Robin Sullivan	627		
Conservative	Roy Miller	619		
Registered electors		7,934		▼612
Turnout		2,144	27.02	▼11.85
Rejected ballots		13	0.61	▲0.07
Labour hold				
Labour hold				
Labour hold				

=== Norbury ===
Norbury (3)
Party	Candidate	Votes	%	±%
Labour	Margaret Mansell*	1,858	48.82	▲2.91
Labour	Peter Hopson*	1,796		
Labour	Shafi Khan*	1,793		
Conservative	Bryan Kendall	1,651	42.26	▼1.03
Conservative	Alan Mason	1,548		
Conservative	Madeleine Marvier	1,516		
Liberal Democrats	David Armer	397	8.92	▼1.88
Liberal Democrats	Peter Scott	358		
Liberal Democrats	Robert Silver	241		
Registered electors		8,711		▼335
Turnout		4,039	46.37	▼6.86
Rejected ballots		21	0.52	▲0.37
Labour hold				
Labour hold				
Labour hold				

=== Purley ===
Purley (3)
Party	Candidate	Votes	%	±%
Conservative	Graham Bass*	2,367	58.06	▲8.88
Conservative	Derek Millard*	2,351		
Conservative	Phillip Thomas	2,170		
Labour	Ian Smith	811	19.82	▲3.93
Labour	Douglas Mantell	782		
Liberal Democrats	Sarah Newton	782	18.86	▼11.37
Labour	Kandaswami Parameswaran	759		
Liberal Democrats	Pamela Randall	739		
Liberal Democrats	Jenefer Riley	716		
UK Independent	Kathleen Serter	129	3.26	New
Registered electors		10,968		▼17
Turnout		4,067	37.08	▼8.60
Rejected ballots		9	0.22	▲0.10
Conservative hold				
Conservative hold				
Conservative hold				

=== Rylands ===
Rylands (2)
Party	Candidate	Votes	%	±%
Labour	Karen Jewitt*	1,323	65.91	▲3.87
Labour	Louisa Woodley	1,115		
Conservative	Colin Gamage	656	34.09	▼3.87
Conservative	Joan North	605		
Registered electors		5,478		▼242
Turnout		2,031	37.08	▼13.69
Rejected ballots		19	0.94	▲0.25
Labour hold				
Labour hold				

=== Sanderstead ===
Sanderstead (2)
Party	Candidate	Votes	%	±%
Conservative	Eric Shaw* (Note: Shaw was elected in a by-election triggered by the death of Cllr Bruce Marshall in 1995)	2,183	67.92	▲14.16
Conservative	Lynne Hale	2,130		
Labour	Ronald Fisher	628	16.69	▲0.07
Liberal Democrats	Spencer Grady	470	14.33	▼12.02
Liberal Democrats	Gavin Howard-Jones	440		
Labour	Paul Smith	432		
Independent Resident	Sheila Lee	41	1.06	New
Independent Resident	David Lee	26		
Registered electors		7,786		▼4
Turnout		3,431	44.06	▼6.71
Rejected ballots		7	0.20	▲0.02
Conservative hold				
Conservative hold				

=== Selsdon ===
Selsdon (2)
Party	Candidate	Votes	%	±%
Conservative	Richard Adamson*	2,277	69.96	▲19.42
Conservative	Dudley Mead*	2,129		
Labour	Barry Buttigieg	559	16.94	▲4.94
Labour	John Simkins	508		
Liberal Democrats	Barbara Cook	420	13.10	▼22.18
Liberal Democrats	John Jefkins	405		
Registered electors		7,547		▲80
Turnout		3,338	44.23	▼10.60
Rejected ballots		9	0.27	▲0.22
Conservative hold				
Conservative hold				

=== South Norwood ===
South Norwood (3)
Party	Candidate	Votes	%	±%
Labour	Jane Avis	1,587	52.65	▲2.35
Labour	Clive Fraser*	1,519		
Labour	Michael Jewitt*	1,484		
Conservative	George Filbey	1,078	35.43	▼2.62
Conservative	Pauline Miles	1,054		
Conservative	John Tooze	957		
Liberal Democrats	Julie Hardy-McBride	357	11.92	▲0.27
Liberal Democrats	Jan Perry	336		
Registered electors		8,157		▼651
Turnout		3,087	37.84	▼8.99
Rejected ballots		15	0.49	▲0.05
Labour hold				
Labour hold				
Labour hold				

=== Spring Park ===
Spring Park (2)
Party	Candidate	Votes	%	±%
Conservative	Janet Marshall*	2,051	60.15	▲2.62
Conservative	Michael Fisher	1,916		
Labour	Sarah Jones	1,089	31.57	▲2.69
Labour	Mary Whitby	993		
Independent Green	Karl Williams	273	8.28	New
Registered electors		7,590		▲68
Turnout		3,369	44.39	▼9.70
Rejected ballots		17	0.50	▲0.25
Conservative hold				
Conservative hold				

=== Thornton Heath ===
Thornton Heath (3)
Party	Candidate	Votes	%	±%
Labour	Patricia Clouder	1,682	62.43	▼4.42
Labour	Adrian Dennis*	1,595		
Labour	Wallace Garratt*	1,571		
Conservative	Peter Davis	694	25.37	▼7.78
Conservative	Andrew Millard	638		
Conservative	Jane Parker	638		
Liberal Democrats	John Cornell	331	12.20	New
Liberal Democrats	Geoffrey Morley	309		
Liberal Democrats	Beryl Pocock	307		
Registered electors		8,952		▼245
Turnout		2,866	32.02	▼10.50
Rejected ballots		22	0.77	▼0.10
Labour hold				
Labour hold				
Labour hold				

=== Upper Norwood ===
Upper Norwood (2)
Party	Candidate	Votes	%	±%
Labour Co-op	Patrick Ryan*	1,440	50.83	▼2.70
Labour Co-op	Ian Payne*	1,187		
Conservative	Phillip Kenny	1,047	39.61	▼6.86
Conservative	Martin Shaw	1,000		
Liberal Democrats	Leo Held	247	9.56	New
Registered electors		5,859		▼193
Turnout		2,698	46.05	▼6.30
Rejected ballots		22	0.82	▲0.47
Labour Co-op hold				
Labour Co-op hold				

=== Waddon ===
Waddon (3)
Party	Candidate	Votes	%	±%
Conservative	Rex Calvert	1,610	47.75	▲16.66
Conservative	Graham Dare	1,556		
Labour	Charles Burling*	1,528	41.99	▼0.96
Conservative	Philip Gamble	1,490		
Labour	Timothy Godfrey	1,298		
Labour	Bernardette Khan^{†} (Note: Khan was a sitting councillor representing the Addiscombe ward)	1,268		
Liberal Democrats	Steven Gauge	363	10.26	▼6.06
Liberal Democrats	Henry Norton	338		
Liberal Democrats	Helen Hadjicharalambous	299		
Registered electors		9,451		▼542
Turnout		3,567	37.74	▼9.09
Rejected ballots		13	0.36	▲0.08
Conservative gain from Labour				
Conservative gain from Labour				
Labour hold				

=== West Thornton ===
West Thornton (3)
Party	Candidate	Votes	%	±%
Labour	Clarence McKenzie*	1,449	61.91	▲4.21
Labour	Gwendolyn Bernard*	1,408		
Labour	Raj Chandarana^{†} (Note: Chandarana was a sitting councillor representing the Thornton Heath ward)	1,363		
Conservative	Roger Taylor	913	38.09	▲10.01
Conservative	Parshotam Bhagat	868		
Conservative	Vinita Bearman	815		
Registered electors		9,374		▼434
Turnout		2,775	29.60	▼14.39
Rejected ballots		35	1.26	▲0.95
Labour hold				
Labour hold				
Labour hold				

=== Whitehorse Manor ===
Whitehorse Manor (3)
Party	Candidate	Votes	%	±%
Labour	Toni Letts*	1,400	66.59	▲3.33
Labour	Gerry Ryan	1,284		
Labour	Martin Tiedemann	1,266		
Conservative	Quentin Hawkins	709	33.41	▲8.69
Conservative	Barbara Colliver	677		
Conservative	Sheila Willis	596		
Registered electors		8,703		▼702
Turnout		2,274	26.13	▼11.47
Rejected ballots		21	0.92	▲0.61
Labour hold				
Labour hold				
Labour hold				

=== Woodcote and Coulsdon West ===
Woodcote and Coulsdon West (3)
Party	Candidate	Votes	%	±%
Conservative	David Osland*	2,163	52.52	▲2.67
Conservative	Anna Hawkins*	2,161		
Conservative	Gavin Barwell	2,009		
Labour	James Darville	807	18.76	▲3.95
Liberal Democrats	John Callen	777	17.75	▼17.59
Labour	Ronald Rowland	768		
Liberal Democrats	Patricia Gauge	697		
Labour	Aslam Hoda	687		
Liberal Democrats	Keith Jacobs	666		
Independent	Owen Kelly	441	10.97	New
Registered electors		11,028		▲184
Turnout		3,963	35.94	▼7.99
Rejected ballots		16	0.40	▲0.38
Conservative hold				
Conservative hold				
Conservative hold				

=== Woodside ===
Woodside (2)
Party	Candidate	Votes	%	±%
Labour Co-op	Brian Finegan*	1,183	52.53	▲1.81
Labour Co-op	Anthony Newman*	1,121		
Conservative	Benjamin Grainger	637	28.55	▼4.77
Conservative	Derek Dorey	615		
Liberal Democrats	Hilary Waterhouse	415	18.92	▲2.96
Registered electors		6,513		▲71
Turnout		2,119	32.53	▼12.13
Rejected ballots		6	0.28	▲0.18
Labour Co-op hold				
Labour Co-op hold				
