= 1990 Croydon London Borough Council election =

1990 local election in England

Croydon Council Election, 1990
- 3 May 1990

All 70 seats up for election to Croydon London Borough Council 36 seats needed for a majority
- Registered: 232,371
- Turnout: 106,375, 45.78%

	First party	Second party	Third party
Leader	Peter Bowness	Unknown	Unknown
Party	Conservative	Labour	Liberal Democrats
Leader since	1976	N/A	N/A
Leader's seat	Croham	N/A	N/A
Seats before	44	26	0
Seats won	41	29 (Note: Results include those from candidates running under the Labour and Co-operative Party name)	0 (Note: Results include those from 3 candidates in Croham ward running under the name Liberal Democratic Focus Team)
Seat change	▼3	▲3	Steady
Popular vote	132,462	99,639	23,982
Percentage	50.16%	37.73%	9.08%
- Map of the results of the 1990 Croydon Council election.
Council control before election
Conservative
Council control after election
Conservative

The 1990 Croydon Council election took place on 3 May 1990 to elect members of Croydon London Borough Council in London, England. The whole council was up for election and the Conservative party stayed in overall control of the council.

== Election result ==
1990 Croydon Council election results
Party	Seats	Gains	Losses	Net gain/loss	Seats %	Votes %	Votes	+/−
Conservative	41	1	4	▼3	58.57	50.16	132,462	
Labour	29	4	1	▲3	41.43	37.73	99,639	
Liberal Democrats	0	0	0	Steady	0.00	9.08	23,982	
Green	0	0	0	Steady	0.00	2.15	5,679	
Residents	0	0	0	Steady	0.00	0.66	1,745	
SDP	0	0	0	Steady	0.00	0.19	501	
Peoples Choice	0	0	0	Steady	0.00	0.03	79	
Total	70						264,087	

↓
41	29
Con	Labour

== Ward results ==
(*) - indicates an incumbent candidate

(†) - Indicates an incumbent candidate that is standing in a different ward

=== Addiscombe ===
Addiscombe (3)
Party	Candidate	Votes	%
Labour Co-op	Jeremy Fitzpatrick*	2,241	43.08
Labour Co-op	Nancy Irwin*	2,219	
Conservative	Richard Billington	2,088	39.81
Labour Co-op	Martin Walker*	2,073	
Conservative	Desmond Wright	2,009	
Conservative	Robert Vaudry	1,941	
Green	Patricia Matthews	478	8.92
Green	Christopher Reeves	424	
Liberal Democrats	Patricia West	414	8.19
Registered electors		10,073	
Turnout		4,967	49.31
Rejected ballots		9	0.18
Labour Co-op hold			
Labour Co-op hold			
Conservative gain from Labour Co-op			

=== Ashburton ===
Ashburton (2)
Party	Candidate	Votes	%
Conservative	Edwin Arram*	1,640	46.28
Conservative	April Slipper	1,529	
Labour	Richard Plackett	1,157	33.20
Labour	Brendan Dooley	1,117	
Green	Betty Browning	371	10.83
Liberal Democrats	Paul West	332	9.69
Registered electors		6,625	
Turnout		3308	49.93
Rejected ballots		5	0.15
Conservative hold			
Conservative hold			

=== Bensham Manor ===
Bensham Manor (3)
Party	Candidate	Votes	%
Labour Co-op	Paul Mee*	2,569	64.34
Labour Co-op	Helen Salmon* (Note: Salmon replaced Cllr Key after their resignation in 1988)	2,566	
Labour Co-op	Alison Roberts^{†} (Note: Roberts was a sitting councillor representing the Whitehorse Manor ward)	2,556	
Conservative	Roger Taylor	1,505	35.66
Conservative	Brian Shackle	1,422	
Conservative	Antony Youd	1,337	
Registered electors		9,888	
Turnout		4440	44.90
Rejected ballots		20	0.45
Labour Co-op hold			
Labour Co-op hold			
Labour Co-op hold			

=== Beulah ===
Beulah (2)
Party	Candidate	Votes	%
Conservative	Michael Fisher	1,442	45.23
Conservative	Steven Hollands	1,413	
Labour	Ruth McNerney* (Note: McNerney replaced Cllr Zdanowicz after he resigned in 1989)	1,342	39.91
Labour	David Turner	1,177	
Liberal Democrats	Leo Held	244	7.73
Green	Laura Hooton	225	7.13
Registered electors		6,477	
Turnout		3146	48.57
Rejected ballots		4	0.13
Conservative hold			
Conservative gain from Labour			

=== Broad Green ===
Broad Green (3)
Party	Candidate	Votes	%
Labour Co-op	Rodney Matlock	2,019	69.26
Labour Co-op	Anthony Slatcher* (Note: Slatcher and Spalding replaced Cllrs Jarrold their resignations in 1988)	1,926	
Labour Co-op	Peter Spalding*	1,896	
Conservative	Kelly Ellender	1,004	30.74
Conservative	Mohammed Khokhar	804	
Conservative	Yvonne Singh	785	
Registered electors		8,864	
Turnout		3677	41.48
Rejected ballots		16	0.44
Labour Co-op hold			
Labour Co-op hold			
Labour Co-op hold			

=== Coulsdon East ===
Coulsdon East (3)
Party	Candidate	Votes	%
Conservative	Christopher Wright	2,562	53.76
Conservative	Susan Taylor* (Note: Taylor replaced Cllr Barber after their resignation in 1987)	2,512	
Conservative	Andrew Pelling*	2,478	
Liberal Democrats	Ian Atkins	1,185	24.14
Liberal Democrats	John Callen	1,114	
Liberal Democrats	Hugh Pierce	1,091	
Labour	Sandra Connelly	641	13.28
Labour	Margaret Conway	625	
Labour	Ian Payne	600	
Green	Angela Marshall	413	8.82
Registered electors		9,424	
Turnout		4627	49.10
Rejected ballots		4	0.09
Conservative hold			
Conservative hold			
Conservative hold			

=== Croham ===
Croham (3)
Party	Candidate	Votes	%
Conservative	Ian Croft*	2,813	52.76
Conservative	Peter Bowness*	2,750	
Conservative	John Hecks*	2,656	
Lib Dem Focus Team	Michael Bishopp	1,396	26.11
Lib Dem Focus Team	Christopher Peacock	1,351	
Lib Dem Focus Team	Roger George	1,322	
Labour	Patrick Holt	727	12.54
Labour	Lydia Sookias	613	
Labour	Michael Ryan	612	
Green	Michael Spencer-Bowdage	367	7.07
Peoples Choice	Mark Samuel	79	1.52
Registered electors		10,055	
Turnout		5,103	50.75
Rejected ballots		7	0.14
Conservative hold			
Conservative hold			
Conservative hold			

=== Fairfield ===
Fairfield (3)
Party	Candidate	Votes	%
Conservative	John Aston*	2,943	53.13
Conservative	Robert Coatman*	2,848	
Conservative	Michael Wunn*	2,677	
Labour	Maria Dennis	1,365	24.99
Labour	Joanna Moriarty	1,328	
Labour	John Golden	1,292	
Green	William Matthews	514	9.67
Liberal Democrats	Philip Barron	481	7.49
Liberal Democrats	John Jefkins	361	
Liberal Democrats	Roger Stephens	351	
SDP	Norman Harris	257	4.72
SDP	Ian Dixie	244	
Registered electors		11,526	
Turnout		5133	44.53
Rejected ballots		8	0.16
Conservative hold			
Conservative hold			
Conservative hold			

=== Fieldway ===
Fieldway (2)
Party	Candidate	Votes	%
Labour Co-op	James Walker*	1,558	73.57
Labour Co-op	Mary Walker*	1,397	
Conservative	John Miller	564	26.43
Conservative	Roy Miller	498	
Registered electors		6,293	
Turnout		2221	35.29
Rejected ballots		9	0.41
Labour Co-op hold			
Labour Co-op hold			

=== Heathfield ===
Heathfield (3)
Party	Candidate	Votes	%
Conservative	Mary Horden*	2,854	65.13
Conservative	Margaret Mead	2,787	
Conservative	Nicholas Perry*	2,780	
Labour	Mark Chapman	990	21.90
Labour	Leslie Campion	966	
Labour	Nicholas Waters	876	
Green	Jennifer Hayward	559	12.97
Registered electors		9,290	
Turnout		2670	28.74
Rejected ballots		7	0.26
Conservative hold			
Conservative hold			
Conservative hold			

=== Kenley ===
Kenley (2)
Party	Candidate	Votes	%
Conservative	Alan Carey*	1,902	62.60
Conservative	Brian Smith*	1,753	
Liberal Democrats	Leonard Wright	471	15.48
Liberal Democrats	William Brewer	432	
Labour	David Price	417	14.15
Labour	David Evans	408	
Green	Hazel Veeder	227	7.77
Registered electors		6,842	
Turnout		2976	43.50
Rejected ballots		3	0.10
Conservative hold			
Conservative hold			

=== Monks Orchard ===
Monks Orchard (2)
Party	Candidate	Votes	%
Conservative	Audrey Cutbill* (Note: Cutbill replaced Cllr Elliot after their death in 1987)	2,710	65.49
Conservative	Derek Loughborough*	2,629	
Labour	David Davis	1,060	25.07
Labour	Marie Henderson	984	
Green	John Lilly	385	9.44
Registered electors		7,897	
Turnout		4159	52.67
Rejected ballots		2	0.05
Conservative hold			
Conservative hold			

=== New Addington ===
New Addington (3)
Party	Candidate	Votes	%
Labour	Brenda Kirkby*	2,068	69.00
Labour Co-op	Roger Burgess*	1,809	
Labour Co-op	Geraint Davies*	1,707	
Conservative	Maurice Piper	890	31.00
Conservative	Alison Davis	845	
Conservative	Jeremy Williams	773	
Registered electors		8,400	
Turnout		3272	38.95
Rejected ballots		19	0.58
Labour hold			
Labour Co-op hold			
Labour Co-op hold			

=== Norbury ===
Norbury (3)
Party	Candidate	Votes	%
Conservative	Lindsay Hodges*	2,162	46.23
Conservative	Colin Johnston*	2,157	
Conservative	Bryan Kendall*	2,127	
Labour	Nicholas Barnes	2,081	43.31
Labour	Stuart Collins	2,070	
Labour	Michael Petrou	1,888	
Liberal Democrats	David Armer	491	10.46
Liberal Democrats	Pamela Freeman	480	
Registered electors		9,316	
Turnout		4850	52.06
Rejected ballots		11	0.23
Conservative hold			
Conservative hold			
Conservative hold			

=== Purley ===
Purley (3)
Party	Candidate	Votes	%
Conservative	Peter Macdonald*	2,869	50.96
Conservative	Derek Millard* (Note: Millard replaced Cllr Smith after his death in 1986)	2,831	
Conservative	David Congdon*	2,812	
Liberal Democrats	Pamela Randall	877	14.21
Liberal Democrats	Graham Wickham	802	
Residents	Cathryn Sansom	797	14.32
Labour	Stephen Baister	725	12.38
Liberal Democrats	Mark Steward	695	
Labour	Patricia Waters	689	
Labour	William Richardson	654	
Green	Bhavani Chellappah	453	8.14
Registered electors		10,941	
Turnout		5047	46.13
Rejected ballots		5	0.10
Conservative hold			
Conservative hold			
Conservative hold			

=== Rylands ===
Rylands (2)
Party	Candidate	Votes	%
Labour	Alan Buckfield	1,488	54.15
Labour	David Petherbridge	1,408	
Conservative	Guy Harding*	1,279	45.85
Conservative	Ethel Mann	1,172	
Registered electors		5,784	
Turnout		2880	49.79
Rejected ballots		14	0.49
Labour gain from Conservative			
Labour gain from Conservative			

=== Sanderstead ===
Sanderstead (2)
Party	Candidate	Votes	%
Conservative	Bruce Marshall*	2,534	66.53
Conservative	Graham Speed	2,331	
Liberal Democrats	Margaret Burnett	703	18.29
Liberal Democrats	John Hatherley	634	
Labour	Robert Irwin	574	15.18
Labour	Michael Phelan	535	
Registered electors		7,460	
Turnout		3834	51.39
Rejected ballots		4	0.10
Conservative hold			
Conservative hold			

=== Selsdon ===
Selsdon (2)
Party	Candidate	Votes	%
Conservative	Richard Adamson	2,584	68.60
Conservative	Dudley Mead*	2,553	
Liberal Democrats	Gloria Truscott	642	16.50
Liberal Democrats	Trevor Barker	593	
Labour	Philip Roberts	582	14.90
Labour	Christine Patrick	534	
Registered electors		7,552	
Turnout		3909	51.76
Rejected ballots		2	0.05
Conservative hold			
Conservative hold			

=== South Norwood ===
South Norwood (3)
Party	Candidate	Votes	%
Conservative	David Lipman*	1,747	41.23
Conservative	Eric Kings	1,681	
Conservative	Beryl Saunders*	1,639	
Labour	Michael Jewitt	1,613	38.94
Labour	Ben Earnshaw-Mansell	1,612	
Labour	Clive Fraser	1,560	
Liberal Democrats	Jonathan Cope	474	10.72
Liberal Democrats	James Borkoles	430	
Liberal Democrats	Christopher Pocock	413	
Green	Christine Roberts	373	9.11
Registered electors		9,105	
Turnout		4090	44.92
Rejected ballots		6	0.15
Conservative hold			
Conservative hold			
Conservative hold			

=== Spring Park ===
Spring Park (2)
Party	Candidate	Votes	%
Conservative	Janet Marshall*	2,654	68.65
Conservative	Denis Perry*	2,632	
Labour	Stephen Moyse	1,226	31.35
Labour	Sandra Wilde	1,188	
Registered electors		7,711	
Turnout		4077	52.87
Rejected ballots		18	0.44
Conservative hold			
Conservative hold			

=== Thornton Heath ===
Thornton Heath (3)
Party	Candidate	Votes	%
Labour	Adrian Dennis*	2,146	49.21
Labour	Wallace Garratt*	2,013	
Labour	Trevor Laffin	1,882	
Conservative	Eric Howell	1,400	32.71
Conservative	Bernard Ampaw	1,336	
Conservative	Catherine Wunn	1,282	
Green	Andrew Ellis	414	10.12
Liberal Democrats	Helen Wallace	339	7.96
Liberal Democrats	Julie Hardy-McBride	327	
Liberal Democrats	Beryl Pocock	313	
Registered electors		9,507	
Turnout		4126	43.40
Rejected ballots		8	0.19
Labour hold			
Labour hold			
Labour hold			

=== Upper Norwood ===
Upper Norwood (2)
Party	Candidate	Votes	%
Conservative	Margaret Parfitt*	1,581	50.35
Conservative	John Yaxley	1,408	
Labour	Patrick Ryan	1,282	40.79
Labour Co-op	Michael Anteney	1,140	
Liberal Democrats	Graem Peters	263	8.86
Registered electors		6,121	
Turnout		3103	50.69
Rejected ballots		6	0.19
Conservative hold			
Conservative hold			

=== Waddon ===
Waddon (3)
Party	Candidate	Votes	%
Labour	Christopher Allen*	2,484	49.45
Labour	Ann Allan	2,401	
Labour	Marilyn Allen	2,322	
Conservative	James Nea*	2,197	43.59
Conservative	Reginald Kent*	2,101	
Conservative	Beverley Winborn	2,054	
Liberal Democrats	Joy Prince	387	6.96
Liberal Democrats	Charles Burling	350	
Liberal Democrats	Mahmood Bhamji	276	
Registered electors		10,272	
Turnout		5181	50.44
Rejected ballots		12	0.23
Labour gain from Conservative			
Labour gain from Conservative			
Labour hold			

=== West Thornton ===
West Thornton (3)
Party	Candidate	Votes	%
Labour	Gwendolyn Bernard*	2,246	51.38
Labour	Clarence McKenzie	2,145	
Labour Co-op	Elaine Gibbon	1,809	
Conservative	Alan Aylmer	1,445	32.94
Conservative	Sarah Pelling	1,306	
Conservative	Yvonne Stewart	1,225	
Liberal Democrats	Simon Held	631	15.68
Registered electors		9,972	
Turnout		4253	42.65
Rejected ballots		11	0.26
Labour hold			
Labour hold			
Labour Co-op hold			

=== Whitehorse Manor ===
Whitehorse Manor (3)
Party	Candidate	Votes	%
Labour Co-op	Peter Champion* (Note: Champion replaced Cllr Smedley after his resignation in 1978)	2,108	56.92
Labour Co-op	Toni Letts^{†} (Note: Letts was a sitting councillor representing the Woodside ward)	1,915	
Labour Co-op	Nuala O'Neill	1,889	
Conservative	Alexandra Burke	1,183	31.50
Conservative	Daphne Read	1,083	
Conservative	Connell Stunell	1,007	
Liberal Democrats	David Holmes	401	11.58
Registered electors		9,447	
Turnout		3645	38.58
Rejected ballots		5	0.14
Labour Co-op hold			
Labour Co-op hold			
Labour Co-op hold			

=== Woodcote and Coulsdon West ===
Woodcote and Coulsdon West (3)
Party	Candidate	Votes	%
Conservative	Maurice Fowler*	2,585	45.59
Conservative	Anna Hawkins	2,513	
Conservative	Samuel Moore*	2,494	
Liberal Democrats	Margaret Billenness	1,105	17.51
Residents	Clare Shallcross	948	17.07
Liberal Democrats	Trevor Austin	934	
Liberal Democrats	Keith Jacobs	877	
Labour	Albert Attwood	709	11.26
Labour	Monica Ryan	609	
Labour	Mohammad Hoda	558	
Green	Stephen Lawlor	476	8.57
Registered electors		11,032	
Turnout		4944	44.82
Rejected ballots		3	0.06
Conservative hold			
Conservative hold			
Conservative hold			

=== Woodside ===
Woodside (2)
Party	Candidate	Votes	%
Labour Co-op	John Barlow	1,338	52.97
Labour	David Trendell	1,315	
Conservative	Peter Campbell	1,233	47.03
Conservative	Stephen Ghero	1,122	
Registered electors		6,497	
Turnout		2737	42.13
Rejected ballots		15	0.55
Labour Co-op hold			
Labour hold			
