= 1994 Croydon London Borough Council election =

1994 local election in England

Croydon Council Election, 1994
- 5 May 1994

All 70 seats to Croydon London Borough Council 36 seats needed for a majority
- Registered: 229,760
- Turnout: 106,790, 46.48% (▲0.70)

	First party	Second party	Third party
Leader	Mary Walker	Peter Bowness	Unknown
Party	Labour	Conservative	Liberal Democrats
Leader since	Unknown	1976	Unknown
Leader's seat	Fieldway	Croham	Unknown
Last election	29 seats	41 seats, 50.16%	0
Seats before	30	40	0
Seats won	40 (Note: Labours results include those from candidates running under the Labour and Co-operative Party name)	30	0
Seat change	▲10	▼10	Steady
Popular vote	106,331	111,586	39,274
Percentage	40.78%	42.80%	15.07%
Swing	▲3.05	▼7.36	▲5.99
- Map of the results of the 1994 Croydon Council election.Conservatives in blue and Labour in red.
Leader of the Council before election
Peter Bowness
Conservative
Elected Leader
Mary Walker
Labour

The 1994 Croydon Council election took place on 5 May 1994 to elect members of Croydon London Borough Council in London, England. The whole council was up for election and the Labour party gained overall control of the council.

Jason Perry, who was elected as the first Mayor of Croydon in 2022, was elected to the council for the first time at this election in Coulsdon East.

== Election result ==
Croydon Council local election results 1994
Party	Seats	Gains	Losses	Net gain/loss	Seats %	Votes %	Votes	+/−
Labour	40	11	0	▲11	57.14	40.78	106,331	▲3.05
Conservative	30	0	11	▼11	42.86	42.80	111,586	▼7.36
Liberal Democrats	0	0	0	Steady	0.00	15.07	39,274	▲5.99
Green	0	0	0	Steady	0.00	0.60	1,555	▼1.55
Independent	0	0	0	Steady	0.00	0.45	1,172	New
The People's Choice	0	0	0	Steady	0.00	0.14	355	▲0.11
Ind. Residents	0	0	0	Steady	0.00	0.09	242	New
Chocolate Fudge Cake Party	0	0	0	Steady	0.00	0.07	175	New
Total	70						260,690	

↓
40	30
Labour	Con

== Ward results ==
(*) - Indicates an incumbent candidate

(†) - Indicates an incumbent candidate standing in a different ward

=== Addiscombe ===
Addiscombe (3)
Party	Candidate	Votes	%	±%
Labour Co-op	Jeremy Fitzpatrick*	2,349	41.92	▼1.16
Labour Co-op	Sean Fitzsimons	2,136		
Labour Co-op	Bernadette Khan	1,946		
Conservative	Martin Brown	1,784	30.87	▼8.94
Conservative	Hella El-Droubie	1,572		
Conservative	Mohammad Khokhar	1,382		
Liberal Democrats	Kay Schilich	614	11.96	▲3.67
Liberal Democrats	Patricia West	609		
Green	Russell Heath	543	10.62	▲1.70
Independent	James Smyth	237	4.63	New
Registered electors		10,215		▲142
Turnout		4,782	46.81	▼2.50
Rejected ballots		11	0.23	▲0.05
Labour Co-op hold				
Labour Co-op hold				
Labour Co-op gain from Conservative				

=== Ashburton ===
Ashburton (2)
Party	Candidate	Votes	%	±%
Conservative	Edwin Arram*	1,367	42.75	▼3.53
Conservative	Avril Slipper*	1,335		
Labour Co-op	Jean Walker	1,225	37.72	▲4.52
Labour Co-op	Martin Walker	1,159		
Liberal Democrats	Paul West	622	19.53	▲9.84
Liberal Democrats	George Schlich	612		
Registered electors		6,532		▼93
Turnout		3,294	50.43	▲0.50
Rejected ballots		2	0.06	▼0.09
Conservative hold				
Conservative hold				

=== Bensham Manor ===
Bensham Manor (3)
Party	Candidate	Votes	%	±%
Labour Co-op	Paul Mee*	2,650	67.54	▲3.20
Labour Co-op	Alison Roberts*	2,621		
Labour Co-op	Helen Salmon*	2,519		
Conservative	Brendan Cullen	1,317	32.46	▼3.20
Conservative	Gloria Hutchens	1,241		
Conservative	John Tooze	1,185		
Registered electors		9,622		▼266
Turnout		4,368	45.40	▲0.50
Rejected ballots		21	0.48	▲0.03
Labour Co-op hold				
Labour Co-op hold				
Labour Co-op hold				

=== Beulah ===
Beulah (2)
Party	Candidate	Votes	%	±%
Labour	Roy Grantham	1,471	46.17	▲6.26
Labour	Sherwan Chowdhury	1,454		
Conservative	Michael Fisher*	1,365	41.87	▼3.36
Conservative	Steven Hollands*	1,289		
Liberal Democrats	Jonathan Cope	402	11.96	▲4.23
Liberal Democrats	Christopher Pocock	356		
Registered electors		6,344		▼133
Turnout		3,336	52.59	▲4.02
Rejected ballots		7	0.21	▲0.08
Labour gain from Conservative				
Labour gain from Conservative				

=== Broad Green ===
Broad Green (3)
Party	Candidate	Votes	%	±%
Labour	Stuart Collins* (Note: Collins replaced Cllr Slatcher after his resignation in 1993)	2,230	74.06	▲4.80
Labour	Rodney Matlock*	2,171		
Labour	Peter Spalding*	2,008		
Conservative	Eric Headlam	832	25.94	▼4.80
Conservative	Keith Pearson	718		
Conservative	Donald Speakman	693		
Registered electors		8,790		▼74
Turnout		3,352	38.13	▼3.35
Rejected ballots		16	0.48	▲0.04
Labour hold				
Labour hold				
Labour hold				

=== Coulsdon East ===
Coulsdon East (3)
Party	Candidate	Votes	%	±%
Conservative	Christopher Wright*	2,228	49.84	▼3.92
Conservative	Christine Prentice* (Note: Prentice replaced Cllr Taylor after her resignation in 1992)	2,105		
Conservative	Jason Perry	2,091		
Liberal Democrats	Ian Atkins	1,597	35.31	▲11.17
Liberal Democrats	John Callen	1,547		
Liberal Democrats	Keith Jacobs	1,408		
Labour	Margaret Conway	736	14.85	▲1.57
Labour	Michael Phelan	608		
Labour	Syed Hassan	570		
Registered electors		9,333		▼91
Turnout		4,517	48.40	▼0.70
Rejected ballots		2	0.04	▼0.05
Conservative hold				
Conservative hold				
Conservative hold				

=== Croham ===
Croham (3)
Party	Candidate	Votes	%	±%
Conservative	Peter Bowness*	2,556	51.78	▼0.98
Conservative	John Hecks*	2,533		
Conservative	Andrew Berry	2,511		
Liberal Democrats	Michael Bishopp	1,330	26.39	▲0.28
Liberal Democrats	Christopher Peacock	1,294		
Liberal Democrats	Malcolm Saunders	1,249		
Labour	Maria Dennis	985	19.34	▲6.80
Labour	Barry Buttigieg	955		
Labour	Jeffrey Primm	898		
Peoples Choice	Mark Samuel	122	2.49	▲0.97
Registered electors		9,994		▼61
Turnout		5,055	50.58	▼0.17
Rejected ballots		4	0.08	▼0.06
Conservative hold				
Conservative hold				
Conservative hold				

=== Fairfield ===
Fairfield (3)
Party	Candidate	Votes	%	±%
Conservative	Richard Billington^{†} (Note: Billington was a sitting councillor representing the Addiscombe ward)	2,505	49.15	▼3.98
Conservative	Robert Coatman*	2,465		
Conservative	Michael Wunn*	2,359		
Labour	Alexander Burridge	1,517	29.71	▲4.72
Labour	Robert Newman	1,479		
Labour	Richard Young	1,434		
Liberal Democrats	Philip Barron	809	15.45	▲7.96
Liberal Democrats	Michael Gill	757		
Liberal Democrats	Christine Hardisty	739		
Chocolate Fudge Cake Party	John Cartwright	175	3.52	New
The People's Choice	Deborah Edmonds	108	2.17	New
Registered electors		11,666		▲140
Turnout		4,998	42.84	▼1.69
Rejected ballots		16	0.32	▲0.16
Conservative hold				
Conservative hold				
Conservative hold				

=== Fieldway ===
Fieldway (2)
Party	Candidate	Votes	%	±%
Labour Co-op	James Walker*	1,508	76.04	▲2.47
Labour Co-op	Mary Walker*	1,411		
Conservative	John Miller	486	23.96	▼2.47
Conservative	Dinah Matthews	433		
Registered electors		5,846		▼447
Turnout		2,112	36.13	▲0.84
Rejected ballots		7	0.33	▼0.08
Labour Co-op hold				
Labour Co-op hold				

=== Heathfield ===
Heathfield (3)
Party	Candidate	Votes	%	±%
Conservative	Margaret Mead*	2,260	52.41	▼12.72
Conservative	Mary Horden*	2,251		
Conservative	Andrew Pelling^{†} (Note: Pelling was a sitting councillor representing the Coulsdon East ward)	2,199		
Labour	Mark Chapman	1,188	25.12	▲3.22
Labour	Alan Buckfield	1,083		
Labour	David Petherbridge	946		
Liberal Democrats	David Holmes	774	16.80	New
Liberal Democrats	Leo Held	711		
Liberal Democrats	Peter Ladanyi	667		
Ind. Residents	Michael Murphy	242	5.67	New
Registered electors		9,193		▼97
Turnout		4,375	47.59	▲18.85
Rejected ballots		4	0.09	▼0.17
Conservative hold				
Conservative hold				
Conservative hold				

=== Kenley ===
Kenley (2)
Party	Candidate	Votes	%	±%
Conservative	Alan Carey*	1,631	55.43	▼7.17
Conservative	Brian Smith*	1,480		
Liberal Democrats	Gordon Burnett	787	27.79	▲12.31
Liberal Democrats	James Kirkwood	772		
Labour	William Richardson	492	16.78	▲2.63
Labour	David Price	450		
Registered electors		6,713		▼129
Turnout		2,972	44.27	▲0.77
Rejected ballots		8	0.29	▲0.19
Conservative hold				
Conservative hold				

=== Monks Orchard ===
Monks Orchard (2)
Party	Candidate	Votes	%	±%
Conservative	Derek Loughborough*	2,326	59.93	▼5.56
Conservative	Peter Campbell	2,308		
Labour	David Davies	900	21.88	▼3.19
Labour	Lynette Murray	792		
Liberal Democrats	David Gosling	739	18.18	New
Liberal Democrats	Leslie Price	666		
Registered electors		7,977		▲80
Turnout		4,076	51.10	▼1.57
Rejected ballots		10	0.25	▲0.20
Conservative hold				
Conservative hold				

=== New Addington ===
New Addington (3)
Party	Candidate	Votes	%	±%
Labour	Geraint Davies*	2,150	70.48	▲1.48
Labour	Trevor Laffin^{†} (Note: Laffin was a sitting councillor representing the Thornton Heath ward)	2,012		
Labour	Val Shawcross	1,912		
Conservative	William Eastoe	906	29.52	▼1.48
Conservative	Roy Miller	843		
Conservative	Paul McCombie	794		
Registered electors		8,546		▲146
Turnout		3,322	38.87	▼0.08
Rejected ballots		18	0.54	▲0.39
Labour hold				
Labour hold				
Labour hold				

=== Norbury ===
Norbury (3)
Party	Candidate	Votes	%	±%
Labour	Peter Hopson	2,082	45.91	▲2.60
Labour	Margaret Mansell	2,074		
Labour	Shafiqul Khan	2,039		
Conservative	Geoffrey Geraghty	1,967	43.29	▼2.94
Conservative	Colin Johnston*	1,940		
Conservative	Bryan Kendall*	1,934		
Liberal Democrats	Pamela Freeman	609	10.80	▲0.34
Liberal Democrats	Geoffrey Morley	426		
Liberal Democrats	Beryl Pocock	422		
Registered electors		9,046		▼270
Turnout		4,815	53.23	▲1.17
Rejected ballots		7	0.15	▼0.08
Labour gain from Conservative				
Labour gain from Conservative				
Labour gain from Conservative				

=== Purley ===
Purley (3)
Party	Candidate	Votes	%	±%
Conservative	Graham Bass* (Note: Bass replaced Cllr Congdon after his resignation in 1992)	2,428	49.18	▼1.78
Conservative	Peter Macdonald*	2,410		
Conservative	Derek Millard*	2,347		
Liberal Democrats	Jenefer Riley	1,512	30.23	▲16.02
Liberal Democrats	Pamela Randall	1,473		
Liberal Democrats	Sarah Newton	1,431		
Labour	Michael Ryan	811	15.89	▲3.61
Labour	Richard Plackett	803		
Labour	Paul Ryan	707		
Green	Shirley Ings	236	4.70	▼3.44
Green	Bruce Horner	221		
Registered electors		10,985		▲44
Turnout		5,018	45.68	▼0.45
Rejected ballots		6	0.12	▲0.02
Conservative hold				
Conservative hold				
Conservative hold				

=== Rylands ===
Rylands (2)
Party	Candidate	Votes	%	±%
Labour	Mark Hourston	1,693	62.04	▲7.89
Labour	Karen Jewitt	1,625		
Conservative	James Bullen	1,068	37.96	▼7.89
Conservative	Owen Thompson	961		
Registered electors		5,720		▼64
Turnout		2,904	50.77	▲0.98
Rejected ballots		20	0.69	▲0.20
Labour hold				
Labour hold				

=== Sanderstead ===
Sanderstead (2)
Party	Candidate	Votes	%	±%
Conservative	Bruce Marshall*	2,083	53.76	▼12.77
Conservative	Graham Speed*	2,024		
Liberal Democrats	Gavin Howard-Jones	1,104	26.35	▲8.06
Liberal Democrats	Barry Stocker	909		
Labour	Roger Wicks	636	16.62	▲1.44
Labour	Jean-Paul Irtelli	634		
The People's Choice	Neville Sprague	125	3.27	New
Registered electors		7,790		▲330
Turnout		3,955	50.77	▼0.62
Rejected ballots		7	0.18	▲0.08
Conservative hold				
Conservative hold				

=== Selsdon ===
Selsdon (2)
Party	Candidate	Votes	%	±%
Conservative	Richard Adamson*	2,060	50.54	▼18.06
Conservative	Dudley Mead*	1,973		
Liberal Democrats	Keith Shuttleworth	1,475	35.28	▲18.78
Liberal Democrats	Edna Wickham	1,341		
Labour	William Brown	509	12.00	▼2.90
Labour	Linda Nazarko	449		
Independent	Alan Sales	87	2.18	New
Registered electors		7,467		▼85
Turnout		4,094	54.83	▲3.07
Rejected ballots		2	0.05	Steady
Conservative hold				
Conservative hold				

=== South Norwood ===
South Norwood (3)
Party	Candidate	Votes	%	±%
Labour	Clive Fraser	1,991	50.30	▲11.36
Labour	Jenny Bushell	1,935		
Labour	Michael Jewitt	1,927		
Conservative	David Lipman*	1,563	38.05	▼3.18
Conservative	Eric Kings*	1,456		
Conservative	Pauline Miles	1,408		
Liberal Democrats	Philip Brown	467	11.65	▲0.93
Liberal Democrats	Jan Perry	446		
Liberal Democrats	Julie Hardy-McBride	443		
Registered electors		8,808		▼297
Turnout		4,125	46.83	▲1.91
Rejected ballots		18	0.44	▲0.29
Labour gain from Conservative				
Labour gain from Conservative				
Labour gain from Conservative				

=== Spring Park ===
Spring Park (2)
Party	Candidate	Votes	%	±%
Conservative	Janet Marshall*	2,396	57.53	▼11.12
Conservative	Denis Perry*	2,302		
Labour	Vanessa Fry	1,228	28.88	▼2.47
Labour	Stephen Moyse	1,129		
Green	Andrew Bebington	555	13.59	New
Registered electors		7,522		▼189
Turnout		4,069	54.09	▲1.22
Rejected ballots		10	0.25	▼0.19
Conservative hold				
Conservative hold				

=== Thornton Heath ===
Thornton Heath (3)
Party	Candidate	Votes	%	±%
Labour	Adrian Dennis*	2,363	66.85	▲17.64
Labour	Wallace Garratt*	2,274		
Labour	Raj Chandarana	2,182		
Conservative	Robert Oliver	1,175	33.15	▲0.44
Conservative	Bernard Ampaw	1,078		
Registered electors		9,197		▼310
Turnout		3,911	42.52	▼0.88
Rejected ballots		34	0.87	▲0.68
Labour hold				
Labour hold				
Labour hold				

=== Upper Norwood ===
Upper Norwood (2)
Party	Candidate	Votes	%	±%
Labour Co-op	Patrick Ryan* (Note: Ryan replaced Cllr Yaxley following his death in 1992)	1,696	53.53	▲12.74
Labour Co-op	Ian Payne	1,491		
Conservative	Margaret Parfitt*	1,396	46.47	▼3.88
Conservative	David Macsweeney	1,372		
Registered electors		6,052		▼69
Turnout		3,168	52.35	▲1.66
Rejected ballots		11	0.35	▲0.16
Labour Co-op gain from Conservative				
Labour Co-op hold				

=== Waddon ===
Waddon (3)
Party	Candidate	Votes	%	±%
Labour	Christopher Allen*	2,094	42.95	▼6.50
Labour	Marilyn Allen*	2,019		
Labour	Charles Burling* (Note: Burling replaced Cllr Allan after her resignation in 1993)	1,888		
Conservative	Rex Calvert	1,490	31.09	▼12.50
Conservative	Bryan Coatman	1,479		
Conservative	Mervyn Gatland	1,375		
Liberal Democrats	Graham Axford	792	16.32	▲9.36
Liberal Democrats	Henry Norton	759		
Liberal Democrats	Roger Barnett	728		
Independent	Peter Collier	449	9.64	New
Registered electors		9,993		▼279
Turnout		4,680	46.83	▼3.61
Rejected ballots		13	0.28	▲0.05
Labour hold				
Labour hold				
Labour hold				

=== West Thornton ===
West Thornton (3)
Party	Candidate	Votes	%	±%
Labour	Elaine Gibbon*	2,354	57.70	▲6.32
Labour	Clarence McKenzie*	2,284		
Labour	Gwendolyn Bernard*	2,230		
Conservative	Alan Aylmer	1,152	28.08	▼4.86
Conservative	Roger Taylor	1,115		
Conservative	Eileen Seaborn	1,075		
Liberal Democrats	Henry Russell	564	14.22	▼1.46
Registered electors		9,808		▼164
Turnout		4,315	43.99	▲1.34
Rejected ballots		7	0.16	▼0.10
Labour hold				
Labour hold				
Labour hold				

=== Whitehorse Manor ===
Whitehorse Manor (3)
Party	Candidate	Votes	%	±%
Labour	Peter Champion*	2,159	63.26	▲6.34
Labour	Nuala O'Neill*	2,102		
Labour	Toni Letts*	2,042		
Conservative	Peter Davis	865	24.72	▼6.78
Conservative	Ian Parker	803		
Conservative	Jill Thomas	794		
Independent	Stanley Wells	399	12.01	New
Registered electors		9,405		▼42
Turnout		3,536	37.60	▼0.98
Rejected ballots		11	0.31	▲0.17
Labour hold				
Labour hold				
Labour hold				

=== Woodcote & Coulsdon West ===
Woodcote and Coulsdon West (3)
Party	Candidate	Votes	%	±%
Conservative	Maurice Fowler*	2,325	49.85	▲4.26
Conservative	Anna Hawkins*	2,293		
Conservative	David Osland	2,238		
Liberal Democrats	Margaret Billenness	1,686	35.34	▲17.83
Liberal Democrats	Trevor Austin	1,612		
Liberal Democrats	Yvonne Jacobs	1,561		
Labour	Ernest King	709	14.81	▲3.55
Labour	Ronald Rowland	686		
Labour	Mohammad Hoda	642		
Registered electors		10,844		▼158
Turnout		4,764	43.93	▼0.89
Rejected ballots		1	0.02	▼0.04
Conservative hold				
Conservative hold				
Conservative hold				

=== Woodside ===
Woodside (2)
Party	Candidate	Votes	%	±%
Labour Co-op	Brian Finegan	1,470	50.72	▼2.25
Labour Co-op	Anthony Newman	1,409		
Conservative	Derek Dorey	967	33.32	▼13.71
Conservative	Joanna Oliver	924		
Liberal Democrats	Hilary Waterhouse	453	15.96	New
Registered electors		6,442		▼55
Turnout		2,877	44.66	▲2.53
Rejected ballots		3	0.10	▼0.45
Labour Co-op hold				
Labour Co-op hold				
