= Kenley (ward) =

Ward in England

Coordinates: 51°19′37″N 0°06′07″W

- ward for Croydon Council
- Boundary of Kenley in Croydon from 2018.
- County: Greater London

Current ward
- Created: 1978
- Councillor: Gayle Gander (Conservative)
- Councillor: Ola Kolade (Conservative)
- Number of councillors: Two (1978-2002), Three (2002-2018), Two (2018-Present)
- UK Parliament constituency: Croydon South

Kenley is a ward covering the Kenley area of the London Borough of Croydon in the United Kingdom. It elects 2 councillors following the boundary changes made official on 3 May 2018. On 6 May 2021, 5 by-elections were held in Croydon following the resignation of 5 councillors across New Addington North, South Norwood, Kenley, Park Hill and Whitgift and Woodside.

== List of Councillors ==
Election	Councillor	Party	Councillor	Party	Councillor	Party
1978	Ward created					
1978	Margaret E. Campbell	Conservative	Brian G. Smith	Conservative	2 Councillors; 1978-2002	
1986	Alan K. Carey	Conservative	Brian G. Smith	Conservative	2 Councillors; 1978-2002	
1998	Jan A. Buttinger	Conservative	Steve L. V. Hollands	Conservative	2 Councillors; 1978-2002	
2002	Jan A. Buttinger	Conservative	Steve L. V. Hollands	Conservative	Steve O'Connell	Conservative
2018	Jan A. Buttinger	Conservative	2 Councillors; 2018-present		Steve O'Connell	Conservative
2021	Jan A. Buttinger	Conservative	2 Councillors; 2018-present		Ola Kolade	Conservative
2022	Gayle Gander	Conservative	2 Councillors; 2018-present		Ola Kolade	Conservative
2026	Gayle Gander	Conservative	2 Councillors; 2018-present		Ola Kolade	Conservative

== Mayoral elections ==
Below are the results for the candidate which received the highest share of the popular vote in the ward at each mayoral election.

Year	Mayoralty	Mayoral candidate	Party	Winner?
2004	Mayor of London	Steven Norris	Conservative	✗
2008	Mayor of London	Boris Johnson	Conservative	✓
2012	Mayor of London	Boris Johnson	Conservative	✓
2016	Mayor of London	Zac Goldsmith	Conservative	✗
2021	Mayor of London	Shaun Bailey	Conservative	✗
2022	Mayor of Croydon	Jason Perry	Conservative	✓
2026	Mayor of Croydon	Jason Perry	Conservative	✓

== Ward Results ==
Croydon Council Election 2026: Kenley (2)
Party	Candidate	Votes	%	±%
Conservative	Gayle Gander	1,835	24.6	
Conservative	Ola Kolade	1,680	22.5	
Green	Catherine Morris	660	8.8	
Reform	David Booth	631	8.4	
Reform	Kim Chadwick	564	7.6	
Green	Sabin Qureshi	508	6.8	
Labour	Rosie Malarkey	455	6.1	
Labour	Kacper Borkowski	428	5.7	
Liberal Democrats	Joanna Drake	351	4.7	
Liberal Democrats	Andrew Bennett	350	4.7	
Turnout		7,469	47.2	+
Conservative hold		Swing		
Conservative hold		Swing		

Croydon Council Election 2022: Kenley (2)
Party	Candidate	Votes	%	±%
Conservative	Gayle Gander	1,720	29.8	
Conservative	Ola Kolade*	1,712	29.6	
Liberal Democrats	Adrian Glendinning	517	9.0	
Liberal Democrats	Benjamin Horne	502	8.7	
Labour	Michael Anteney	376	6.5	
Green	Catherine Morris	346	6.0	
Labour	Shila Halai	340	5.9	
Green	Kristian Atkinson	262	4.5	
Turnout				
Conservative hold		Swing		
Conservative hold		Swing		

Kenley ward by-election, 6 May 2021
Party	Candidate	Votes	%	±%
Conservative	Ola Kolade	2,220	59.7	▼5.7
Labour	Stewart Sailing	618	16.6	▼3.2
Liberal Democrats	Adrian Glendinning	455	12.2	▲5.6
Green	Esther Sutton	372	10.0	▲1.9
Heritage	Zachary Stiling	52	1.4	N/A
Majority		1,602		
Turnout		47.1		
Conservative hold		Swing		

Croydon Council Election 2018: Kenley (2)
Party	Candidate	Votes	%	±%
Conservative	Jan Buttinger*	2,025	34.17	
Conservative	Stephen O'Connell*	1,966	33.17	
Labour	Maggie Conway	613	10.34	
Labour	Appu Srinivasan	448	7.56	
Green	Kate Morris	250	4.22	
Green	Ian Edward Dixon	232	3.91	
Liberal Democrats	Anne Howard	207	3.49	
Liberal Democrats	Arfan Bhatti	186	3.14	
Majority		1,353	22.83	
Turnout				
Conservative hold		Swing		
Conservative hold		Swing		

Croydon Council Election 2014: Kenley (3)
Party	Candidate	Votes	%	±%
Conservative	Janice Buttinger	2,271	19.3	
Conservative	Steven Hollands	2,123	18.0	
Conservative	Steve O'Connell	2,111	17.9	
UKIP	David J. Hooper	803	7.7	
UKIP	Lynnda N. Robson	728	7.6	
UKIP	Paul I. C. Manton	714	7.6	
Labour	Sarah L. Ward	451	3.8	
Labour	Christopher R. Williams	388	3.3	
Labour	Mary-Romoline Croos	356	3.0	
Green	Shorai A. Dixon-King	336	2.8	
Liberal Democrats	Angela M. Catto	271	2.3	
Green	Tom Voute	265	2.1	
Liberal Democrats	Olive K. Abdey	238	2.0	
Liberal Democrats	James P. Knight	217	1.8	
Majority				
Total votes		11,733		
Conservative hold		Swing		
Conservative hold		Swing		
Conservative hold		Swing		

Croydon Council Election 2010: Kenley (3)
Party	Candidate	Votes	%	±%
Conservative	Janice Buttinger	4,170		
Conservative	Steve O'Connell	3,980		
Conservative	Steven Hollands	3,914		
Liberal Democrats	Angela Catto	1,699		
Liberal Democrats	James Knight	1,510		
Liberal Democrats	Heather Jefkins	1,289		
Labour	Laura Doughty	1,230		
Labour	Annmarie Kennedy	1,053		
Labour	Mistaun Kabir	924		
Green	Ian Dixon	582		
Green	Anneka Dixon-King	512		
Green	Tom Voute	365		
Turnout		7,423	67.75%	
Conservative hold		Swing		
Conservative hold		Swing		
Conservative hold		Swing		

Croydon Council Election 2006: Kenley (3)
Party	Candidate	Votes	%	±%
Conservative	Jan Buttinger	2,631		
Conservative	Steve O'Connell	2,530		
Conservative	Steve Hollands	2,523		
Liberal Democrats	Angela Catto	757		
Green	Tom Voute	729		
Liberal Democrats	Linda Evans	650		
Labour	Joy Prince	461		
Labour	Mohammed Mir	406		
Turnout		4,367	41.7%	
Registered electors		10,473		
Conservative hold		Swing		
Conservative hold		Swing		
Conservative hold		Swing		

Croydon Council Election 2002: Kenley (3)
Party	Candidate	Votes	%	±%
Conservative	Janice A. Buttinger	2,274		
Conservative	Steven L.V. Hollands	2,196		
Conservative	Stephen J. O’Connell	2,185		
Liberal Democrats	Angela M. Catto	647		
Liberal Democrats	Jeremy M. Hargreaves	579		
Liberal Democrats	Susan B. Gauge	543		
Labour	Barry P. Buttigieg	528		
Labour	Zenia R.S. Jamison	480		
Labour	Sherwan H. Chowdhury	479		
Majority				
Turnout				
Conservative hold		Swing		
Conservative hold		Swing		
Conservative hold		Swing		

Croydon Council Election 1998: Kenley (2)
Party	Candidate	Votes	%	±%
Conservative	Janice A. Buttinger	1,500		
Conservative	Steven L.V. Hollands	1,445		
Labour	Julie A. Candy	465		
Labour	Michael A. Rosenbloom	401		
Liberal Democrats	Jeremy A. Hargreaves	339		
Liberal Democrats	Robert Beadle	325		
Majority				
Turnout				
Registered electors				
Conservative hold		Swing		
Conservative hold		Swing		

Croydon Council Election 1994: Kenley (2)
Party	Candidate	Votes	%	±%
Conservative	Alan K. Carey	1,631		
Conservative	Brian G. Smith	1,480		
Liberal Democrats	Gordon E. Burnett	787		
Liberal Democrats	James M. T. Kirkwood	772		
Labour	William E. J. Richardson	492		
Labour	David P. Price	450		
Majority		693		
Turnout				
Registered electors				
Conservative hold		Swing		
Conservative hold		Swing		

Croydon Council Election 1990: Kenley (2)
Party	Candidate	Votes	%	±%
Conservative	Alan K. Carey	1,902		
Conservative	Brian G. Smith	1,753		
Liberal Democrats	Leonard A. Wright	471		
Liberal Democrats	William J. Brewer	432		
Labour	David P. Price	417		
Labour	David R. Evans	408		
Green	Hazel Veeder	227		
Majority		1,282		
Turnout				
Registered electors				
Conservative hold		Swing		
Conservative hold		Swing		

Croydon Council Election 1986: Kenley (2)
Party	Candidate	Votes	%	±%
Conservative	Alan K. Carey	1,478		
Conservative	Brian G. Smith	1,363		
Alliance	Sidney R. H. King	752		
Alliance	Robert D. Riddett	723		
Labour	Andrew J. Cridford	289		
Labour	Lillian L. Scott	254		
Majority		611		
Turnout				
Registered electors				
Conservative hold		Swing		
Conservative hold		Swing		

Croydon Council Election 1982: Kenley (2)
Party	Candidate	Votes	%	±%
Conservative	Margaret E. Campbell	2,192		
Conservative	Brian G. Smith	2,061		
Alliance	Ivo Nicholls	664		
Alliance	Robert D. Riddett	634		
Labour	Roger M. Burgess	268		
Labour	Malcolm E. Kilsby	263		
Turnout				
Conservative hold		Swing		
Conservative hold		Swing		

Croydon Council Election 1978: Kenley (2)
Party	Candidate	Votes	%	±%
Conservative	Margaret E. Campbell	1,905		
Conservative	Brian G. Smith	1,806		
Labour	Stephen E. Smart	355		
Labour	Colin F. Whelton	314		
Liberal	Richard L. Dawson	249		
Liberal	Norman McLeod	244		
Independent	Kenneth P. Dulieu	201		
Majority		1,451		
Turnout				
Registered electors				
Conservative win (new seat)				
Conservative win (new seat)				
