= Roy Grantham =

Roy Aubrey Grantham CBE (12 December 1926 – 25 October 2013) was a United Kingdom trade union leader who was the last general secretary of the Association of Professional, Executive, Clerical and Computer Staff (APEX) which was involved in the Grunwick dispute in the 1970s.

He was born in Birmingham and attended King Edward VI Grammar School, Aston before being conscripted to work in a coal mine as a Bevin Boy. He then worked for the Inland Revenue which he left to become a full-time union organizer for the Clerical and Administrative Workers Union in 1959. In 1963 he became the assistant secretary and in 1970 the general secretary. He was also member of the TUC General Council for 11 years.

Grantham was considered a moderate leader and during a bitter dispute at the Grunwick film processing plant he faced criticism from other trade unionists for not asking other unions to cut off power and supplies, but he explained that it would be illegal to do so. He also expressed concern that picketing by other unions such at the Yorkshire miners led by Arthur Scargill would not help.

Grantham then became the president of the Confederation of Shipbuilding and Engineering Unions and the Labour government appointed him a director of Chrysler UK, but he resigned in 1981 when the company closed its Linwood plant in Scotland. In 1985 he was elected chairman of the TUC employment committee. He was pro-European and did not support nationalisation of the banks but supported nationalisation in other sectors. He was appointed a CBE in the 1990 New Year Honours.

In 1994, Grantham was elected as a councillor for Beulah in the London Borough of Croydon. He was re-elected in 1998, and was appointed as an honorary alderman after standing down in 2002.

Trade union offices
Preceded by Arthur Lummis Gibson	Midlands Area Secretary of the Clerical and Administrative Workers' Union; 1958–1970	Succeeded by Frank Leath
Preceded by Henry Chapman	General Secretary of the Association of Professional, Executive, Clerical and Computer Staff; 1971 –1989	Succeeded by Position abolished
Preceded by Ken Baker	President of the Confederation of Shipbuilding and Engineering Unions; 1980–1981	Succeeded by Gerry Eastwood
