= Croydon West =

UK Parliament constituency (1950–1955, 2024 onwards)

- Borough constituency for the House of Commons
- Interactive map of boundaries from 2024
- County: Greater London
- Electorate: 70,812 (March 2020)
- Major settlements: Croydon, South Norwood, Thornton Heath, Waddon

Current constituency
- Created: 2024
- Member of Parliament: Sarah Jones (Labour)
- Seats: One
- Created from: Croydon Central, Croydon North and Croydon South

1950–1955
- Created from: Croydon North, Croydon South and East Surrey
- Replaced by: Croydon North West and Croydon South

Croydon West is a borough constituency which returned one Member of Parliament (MP) to the House of Commons of the Parliament of the United Kingdom from 1950 to 1955 by the first past the post system of election.

Further to the completion of the 2023 review of Westminster constituencies, the seat was re-established for the 2024 general election. It primarily comprises the majority of the abolished constituency of Croydon North, with the addition of Croydon town centre and the community of Waddon.

The seat has been represented since 2024 by Sarah Jones of the Labour Party, previously the MP for the abolished seat of Croydon Central from 2017 to 2024.

== Constituency profile ==
Croydon West is an entirely urban and suburban constituency located in the Borough of Croydon on the outskirts of Greater London. It covers the centre of the large town of Croydon and the neighbourhoods to its north and west, including Waddon, Selhurst and South Norwood. Like much of suburban London, Croydon grew rapidly during the 19th century with the arrival of rail transport and now serves as a commuter town. The constituency has high levels of deprivation, with much of it falling within the 20% most-deprived areas in England.

Residents of Croydon West are generally young and have low levels of income and professional employment compared with the rest of London. House prices are similar to the national average but much lower than the London average. The constituency has a high level of ethnic diversity; at the 2021 census, White people made up 33% of the population, one-third of whom were not of British origin. Black people were 31% and Asians were 23%. At the local borough council, most of the constituency is represented by Labour Party councillors, with a small number of Conservative and Green Party representatives in the south of the constituency. Voters in Croydon West were mostly supportive of remaining in the European Union in the 2016 referendum; an estimated 56% voted to remain compared to 48% nationwide.

== Politics and history ==
Croydon West was a short-lived seat for the 1950 general election, creating three seats in the County Borough of Croydon from the previous two, also taking in areas from the East Surrey constituency to the south.

Croydon West took in areas of the former Croydon North and Croydon South constituencies, and East Surrey. It bordered Croydon East, Croydon North, East Surrey and Mitcham.

All three Croydon constituencies were abolished five years later at the 1955 general election, re-creating Croydon South and creating Croydon North East and Croydon North West seats.

For the entirety of its first iteration in the 1950s, Croydon West's Member of Parliament was Conservative Richard Thompson. It was contested in two elections: the 1950 general election and the 1951 general election. Prior to 1950, Croydon South had been held by Labour and most of the Labour voters were re-drawn into Croydon West, making it a marginal seat.

In 2024, the re-established seat was won by the Labour Party with a majority of 37.3%.

== Boundaries ==
Dates	Local authority	Maps	Wards
1950–1955	County Borough of Croydon	Location within Surrey	Broad Green, Central, South, Waddon, and Whitehorse Manor.
2024-present	London Borough of Croydon	Location within Greater London	Bensham Manor, Broad Green, Fairfield, Selhurst, South Norwood, Waddon, West Thornton, Woodside (small part comprising polling district WDS1)

== Members of Parliament ==
Election	Member	Party	Notes
1950	Richard Thompson	Conservative	Contested Croydon South following redistribution
1955	constituency abolished		
2024	Sarah Jones	Labour	Member for main predecessor seat (2017–2024)

== Election results ==
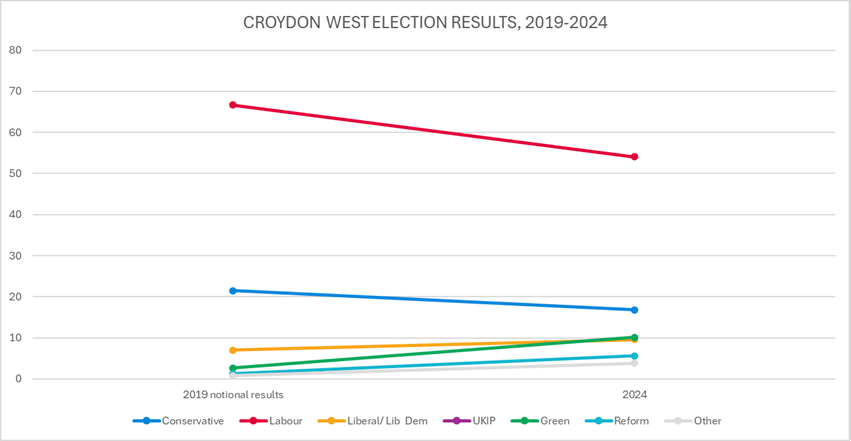
Election results 2019-2024

=== Elections in the 2020s ===
General election 2024: Croydon West
Party	Candidate	Votes	%	±%
Labour	Sarah Jones	20,612	54.1	▼12.6
Conservative	Simon Fox	6,386	16.8	▼4.7
Green	Ria Patel	3,851	10.1	▲7.4
Liberal Democrats	Jahir Hussain	3,667	9.6	▲2.6
Reform	Vinayak Malhotra	2,148	5.6	▲4.3
Workers Party	Ahsan Ullah	708	1.9	N/A
Taking the Initiative	Donna Murray-Turner	503	1.3	N/A
TUSC	April Ashley	247	0.6	N/A
Majority		14,226	37.3	▼7.9
Turnout		38,122	48.9	▼13.9
Registered electors		77,942		
Labour hold		Swing	▼4.0	

=== Elections in the 2010s ===
2019 notional result
Party	Vote	%
Labour	29,651	66.7
Conservative	9,561	21.5
Liberal Democrats	3,097	7.0
Green	1,205	2.7
Brexit Party	587	1.3
Others	348	0.8
Turnout	44,449	62.8
Electorate	70,812	

=== Elections in the 1950s ===
General election 1951: Croydon West
Party	Candidate	Votes	%	±%
Conservative	Richard Thompson	23,484	52.2	+4.9
Labour	Gerald Gardiner	21,534	47.8	+2.7
Majority		1,950	4.3	+2.1
Turnout		45,018		
Conservative hold		Swing	+1.1	

General election 1950: Croydon West
Party	Candidate	Votes	%
Conservative	Richard Thompson	21,411	47.3
Labour	David Rees-Williams	20,424	45.1
Liberal	Arthur Russell Mayne	3,101	6.8
Communist	Bob Jarvie	336	0.7
Majority		987	2.2
Turnout		45,272	
Conservative win (new seat)			

== Sources ==
- The Times House of Commons 1950. Times Media. 1950.
- Leigh Rayment's Historical List of MPs – Constituencies beginning with "C" (part 6) [Archived]
