= Waddon (ward) =

Electoral ward in the London Borough of Croydon

Coordinates: 51°22′37″N 0°06′58″W

- ward for Croydon Council
- Boundary of Waddon in Croydon from 2018.
- County: Greater London

Current ward
- Created: 1965
- Councillor: Rowenna Davis (Labour)
- Councillor: Sam Attwater (Labour)
- Councillor: Ellily Ponnuthurai (Labour)
- Number of councillors: Three
- UK Parliament constituency: Croydon West

Waddon is a ward in the London Borough of Croydon. The new ward gained territory from Broad Green, and lost some residences to South Croydon and Purley Oaks and Riddlesdown wards as a result of the review. The first election since the boundary changes was on 3 May 2018 as part of the 2018 local elections.

== List of Councillors ==
Election	Councillor	Party	Councillor	Party	Councillor	Party
1964	Ward created					
1964	V. Burgos	Labour	J.T. Twitchett	Labour	P. Whitehead	Labour
1968	L.J. Young	Conservative	D.S. Kingsland	Conservative	R.J. Moseley	Conservative
1971	V. Burgos	Labour	A. Brett	Labour	B.H. Davies	Labour
1974	V. Burgos	Labour	A. Brett	Labour	M.E. Crick	Conservative
1976 and 1977 By-elections	James J. Nea	Conservative	A. Brett	Labour	Michael D. Wunn	Conservative
1978	James J. Nea	Conservative	Reginald H. Kent	Conservative	Michael D. Wunn	Conservative
1982	James J. Nea	Conservative	Reginald H. Kent	Conservative	Beverley S. Winborn	Conservative
1986	James J. Nea	Conservative	Reginald H. Kent	Conservative	Christopher R. Allen	Labour
1990	Ann F. Allan	Labour	Marilyn K. Allen	Labour	Christopher R. Allen	Labour
1993 By-election	Charles E. Burling	Labour	Marilyn K. Allen	Labour	Christopher R. Allen	Labour
1998	Charles E. Burling	Labour	Rex A.J. Calvert	Conservative	Graham T. Dare	Conservative
Defection	Charles E. Burling	Labour	Rex A.J. Calvert	Conservative	Graham T. Dare	Liberal Democrat
2002	Alison J. Butler	Labour	Charlotte M. McAree	Labour	Paul J. Smith	Labour
2006	Tony Harris	Conservative	Jonathan Driver	Conservative	Simon Hoar	Conservative
2009 By-election	Tony Harris	Conservative	Clare Hilley	Conservative	Simon Hoar	Conservative
2014	Robert W. Canning	Labour	Andrew J. Pelling	Labour	Joy I.D. Prince	Labour
2022	Robert W. Canning	Labour	Andrew J. Pelling	Independent	Joy I.D. Prince	Labour
2022	Rowenna Davis	Labour	Simon Fox	Conservative	Ellily Ponnuthurai	Labour
2026	Rowenna Davis	Labour	Sam Attwater	Labour	Ellily Ponnuthurai	Labour

== Mayoral election results ==
Below are the results for the candidate which received the highest share of the popular vote in the ward at each mayoral election.

Year	Mayoral Election	Mayoral candidate	Party	Winner?
2004	Mayor of London	Ken Livingstone	Labour	✓
2008	Mayor of London	Boris Johnson	Conservative	✓
2012	Mayor of London	Ken Livingstone	Labour	✗
2016	Mayor of London	Sadiq Khan	Labour	✓
2021	Mayor of London	Sadiq Khan	Labour	✓
2022	Mayor of Croydon	Val Shawcross	Labour	✗
2026	Mayor of Croydon	Rowenna Davis	Labour	✗

== Summary ==
Councillors elected by party at each general borough election.

- Labour
- Conservative

== Ward results ==
=== 2018 to present ===
Croydon Council Election 2026: Waddon (3)
Party	Candidate	Votes	%	±%
Labour	Rowenna Davis	1,890	38.8	
Labour	Sam Attwater	1,476	30.3	
Labour	Ellily Ponnuthurai	1,400	28.7	
Conservative	Simon Fox	1,270	26.1	
Green	Helen Lovesey	1,141	23.4	
Conservative	Donald Ekekhomen	1,076	22.1	
Green	Dan Shelley	1,016	20.8	
Conservative	Laksh Kumar	975	20.0	
Green	Callum Symons	876	18.0	
Reform	Ben Beeches	741	15.2	
Reform	Adnan Ghori	604	12.4	
Reform	Janusz Weyman	588	12.1	
Liberal Democrats	Robert Sherer	356	7.3	
Taking the Initiative	Jadah Archer	67	1.4	
Taking the Initiative	Sienna Rowbury	63	1.3	
Taking the Initiative	Jermaine Sam	55	1.1	
Turnout		4,875	37.55	+5.87
Labour hold		Swing		
Labour gain from Conservative		Swing		
Labour hold		Swing		

Croydon Council Election 2022: Waddon (3)
Party	Candidate	Votes	%	±%
Labour	Rowenna Davis	1,620		
Conservative	Simon Fox	1,406		
Labour	Ellily Ponnuthurai	1,397		
Labour	Jessica Rich	1,394		
Conservative	Donald Ekekhomen	1,238		
Conservative	Sharmmi Jeganmogan	1,174		
Independent	Andrew Pelling*	705		
Green	Simon Jones	497		
Green	Imogen Loucas	487		
Green	Mary Sibtain	414		
Liberal Democrats	Yusuf Osman	377		
Liberal Democrats	Josh Viggiani	363		
Turnout		4,069	31.68%	
Registered electors		12,845		
Labour hold		Swing		
Conservative gain from Labour		Swing		
Labour hold		Swing		

Croydon Council Election 2018: Waddon (3)
Party	Candidate	Votes	%	±%
Labour	Robert William Canning	2,209	17.04	
Labour	Joy Prince	2,134	16.46	
Labour	Andrew John Pelling	2,103	16.22	
Conservative	Alessia Cesana	1,683	12.98	
Conservative	Luke Springthorpe	1,645	12.69	
Conservative	Donald Osaro Ekekhomen	1,622	12.51	
Green	Nicholas Sheridan Barnett	357	2.75	
Green	Grace Onions	326	2.51	
Green	Andy Ellis	260	2.01	
Liberal Democrats	Yusuf Ali Osman	188	1.45	
Liberal Democrats	Karen Lesley Townsend	169	1.30	
Liberal Democrats	Alaric Taylor	145	1.12	
Unity in Action	Marianne Bowness	63	0.49	
Unity in Action	Winston McKenzie	59	0.46	
Majority		420	3.24	
Turnout				
Labour hold		Swing		
Labour hold		Swing		
Labour hold		Swing		

=== 2002 to 2018 ===
Croydon Council Election 2014: Waddon (3)
Party	Candidate	Votes	%	±%
Labour	Robert W. Canning	1,965	14.23	
Labour	Andrew John Pelling	1,937	14.02	
Labour	Joy I.D. Prince	1,924	13.92	
Conservative	Tony Harris	1,803	13.05	
Conservative	Simon Hoar	1,696	12.28	
Conservative	Mark P.A. Johnson	1,565	11.33	
UKIP	Jonathan W. Bailey	585	4.24	
UKIP	Kevin Adamson	575	4.16	
UKIP	Graham Rix	537	3.89	
Green	Mary J. Davey	324	2.35	
Green	Paula G. Onions	293	2.12	
Liberal Democrats	Kirsty S. Armstrong	197	1.43	
Green	Martyn Post	190	1.34	
Liberal Democrats	Michael J. Tavares	151	1.01	
TUSC	Anindya Bhattacharya	71	0.51	
Turnout				
Labour gain from Conservative		Swing		
Labour gain from Conservative		Swing		
Labour gain from Conservative		Swing		

Croydon Council Election 2010: Waddon (3)
Party	Candidate	Votes	%	±%
Conservative	Tony Harris	2,656		
Conservative	Clare V. Hilley	2,627		
Conservative	Simon Hoar	2,423		
Labour	Hamida Ali	2,078		
Labour	Joy Prince	2,047		
Labour	Dave Christison	1,927		
Liberal Democrats	Geoffrey V. Gauge	1,332		
Liberal Democrats	Nicholas L. Katchis	1,285		
Liberal Democrats	Suzanne Roquette	1,152		
Green	Mary J. Davey	539		
Green	Grace Onions	501		
Green	Tony Bishop-Weston	493		
Turnout				
Conservative hold		Swing		
Conservative hold		Swing		
Conservative hold		Swing		

Waddon by-election, 12 February 2009
Party	Candidate	Votes	%	±%
Conservative	Clare Hilley	1,462	46.0	+2.7
Labour	Ian Payne	1,222	38.5	+0.7
BNP	Charlotte Lewis	157	4.9	+4.9
Liberal Democrats	Patricia Gauge	150	4.7	−2.7
Green	Mary J. Davey	115	3.6	−5.4
UKIP	Clinton McKenzie	48	1.5	+1.5
The People's Choice! Exclusively For All	Mark R. L. Samuel	13	0.4	+0.4
Monster Raving Loony	John S. Cartwright	11	0.3	+0.3
Majority		240	7.5	
Turnout		3,178	28.6	
Conservative hold		Swing		

The by-election was called following the death of Cllr. Jonathan M. Driver.

Croydon Council Election 2006: Waddon (3)
Party	Candidate	Votes	%	±%
Conservative	Tony Harris	2,335		
Conservative	Jonathan Driver	2,285		
Conservative	Simon Hoar	2,215		
Labour	Alison Butler	2,040		
Labour	Charlotte McAree	1,973		
Labour	Paul Smith	1,942		
Green	Mary Davey	485		
Liberal Democrats	Valerie Hargrave	402		
Liberal Democrats	Geoffrey Gauge	395		
Pensions Action Alliance	Eileen Daisley	135		
Pensions Action Alliance	Alan Crawley	133		
Pensions Action Alliance	Helen Crawley	117		
Turnout		5,077	45.8%	
Conservative gain from Labour		Swing		
Conservative gain from Labour		Swing		
Conservative gain from Labour		Swing		

Croydon Council Election 2002: Waddon (3)
Party	Candidate	Votes	%	±%
Labour	Alison J. Butler	1,609		
Labour	Charlotte M. McAree	1,585		
Labour	Paul J. Smith	1,532		
Conservative	Jonathan M. Driver	1524		
Conservative	Rex A.J. Calvert	1522		
Conservative	Philip P. Gamble	1475		
Liberal Democrats	Joan Leck	413		
Liberal Democrats	Suzanne U. Roquette	401		
Liberal Democrats	Patricia Gauge	394		
Turnout				
Labour gain from Conservative		Swing		
Labour gain from Conservative		Swing		
Labour hold		Swing		

=== 1978 to 2002 ===
Croydon Council Election 1998: Waddon (3)
Party	Candidate	Votes	%	±%
Conservative	Rex A.J. Calvert	1,610		
Conservative	Graham T. Dare	1,556		
Labour	Charles E. Burling	1,528		
Conservative	Philip P. Gamble	1490		
Labour	Timothy Godfrey	1298		
Labour	Bernardette Khan	1268		
Liberal Democrats	Steven H. Gauge	363		
Liberal Democrats	Henry J. Norton	338		
Liberal Democrats	Helen Hadjicharalambous	299		
Turnout				
Conservative gain from Labour		Swing		
Conservative gain from Labour		Swing		
Labour hold		Swing		

Croydon Council Election 1994: Waddon (3)
Party	Candidate	Votes	%	±%
Labour	Christopher R. Allen	2,094		
Labour	Marilyn K. Allen	2,019		
Labour	Charles E. Burling	1,888		
Conservative	Rex A.J. Calvert	1490		
Conservative	Bryan E. Coatman	1479		
Conservative	Mervyn R. Gatland	1375		
Liberal Democrats	Graham J. Axford	792		
Liberal Democrats	Henry J. Norton	759		
Liberal Democrats	Roger Barnett	728		
Independent	Peter J. Collier	449		
Turnout				
Labour hold		Swing		
Labour hold		Swing		
Labour hold		Swing		

Waddon by-election, 12 August 1993
Party	Candidate	Votes	%	±%
Labour	Charles E. Burling	1,389	43.7	
Liberal Democrats	Henry J. Norton	772	24.3	
Conservative	Patricia F. L. Knight	728	22.9	
Independent Resident	Peter J. Collier	213	6.7	
Green	Phillip D. Duckworth	79	2.5	
Turnout			31.6	
Labour hold		Swing		

The by-election was called following the resignation of Cllr. Ann A. Allan.

Croydon Council Election 1990: Waddon (3)
Party	Candidate	Votes	%	±%
Labour	Christopher R. Allen	2,484		
Labour	Ann F. Allan	2,401		
Labour	Marilyn K. Allen	2,322		
Conservative	James J. Nea	2197		
Conservative	Reginald H. Kent	2101		
Conservative	Beverley S. Winborn	2054		
Liberal Democrats	Joy I.D. Prince	387		
Liberal Democrats	Charles E. Burling	350		
Liberal Democrats	Mahmood I. Bhamji	276		
Turnout				
Labour gain from Conservative		Swing		
Labour gain from Conservative		Swing		
Labour hold		Swing		

Croydon Council Election 1986: Waddon (3)
Party	Candidate	Votes	%	±%
Conservative	James J. Nea	1,994		
Conservative	Reginald H. Kent	1,941		
Labour	Christopher R. Allen	1,876		
Conservative	Beverley S. Winborn	1808		
Labour	Anthony J. Slatcher	1776		
Labour	Andrew C. Theobald	1730		
Alliance	Charles E. Burling	908		
Alliance	Joy I.D. Prince	874		
Alliance	William N. Tucker	852		
National Front	Paul Ballard	144		
Turnout				
Conservative hold		Swing		
Conservative hold		Swing		
Labour gain from Conservative		Swing		

Croydon Council Election 1982: Waddon (3)
Party	Candidate	Votes	%	±%
Conservative	James J. Nea	2,328		
Conservative	Reginald H. Kent	2,285		
Conservative	Beverley S. Winborn	2,151		
Labour	Christopher R. Allen	1480		
Labour	Hartley Dean	1400		
Labour	Martin D. Walker	1382		
Alliance	Janet M. Sinclair	773		
Alliance	Joan M. Leck	764		
Alliance	Ian Wonacott	681		
Turnout				
Conservative hold		Swing		
Conservative hold		Swing		
Conservative hold		Swing		

Croydon Council Election 1978: Waddon (3)
Party	Candidate	Votes	%	±%
Conservative	James J. Nea	2,639		
Conservative	Michael D. Wunn	2,459		
Conservative	Reginald H. Kent	2,419		
Labour	Alan Brett	1682		
Labour	Barry V. Bulled	1655		
Labour	Christopher Wright	1512		
Liberal	J. Scott	242		
Workers Revolutionary	J.E. Bean	82		
Turnout				
Conservative gain from Labour		Swing		
Conservative hold		Swing		
Conservative gain from Labour		Swing		

=== 1964 to 1978 ===
Waddon by-election, 30 June 1977
Party	Candidate	Votes	%	±%
Conservative	Michael D. Wunn	1,943		
Labour	Barry V. Bulled	1,592		
Liberal	Patricia M. Boreham	164		
National Party	William H. Porter	154		
National Front	Roland Dummer	124		
Turnout			33.2	

Waddon By-election 1976
Party	Candidate	Votes	%	±%
Conservative	James J. Nea	2,225		
Labour	Barry V. Bulled	1756		
National Party	William H. Porter	442		
National Front	John A. Fisher	329		
Liberal	Roger W. Stevens	221		
Independent	Charles J. De Val	118		
Turnout				

Croydon Council Election 1974: Waddon (3)
Party	Candidate	Votes	%	±%
Labour	V. Burgos	2,366		
Conservative	M. E. Crick	2,341		
Labour	A. Brett	2,327		
Conservative	J. J. Nea	2317		
Conservative	M. D. Wunn	2227		
Labour	B. H. Davies	2180		
Liberal	Mrs Z. George	537		
Turnout				
Labour hold		Swing		
Conservative gain from Labour		Swing		
Labour hold		Swing		

Croydon Council Election 1971: Waddon (3)
Party	Candidate	Votes	%	±%
Labour	V. Burgos	3,449		
Labour	A. Brett	3,408		
Labour	B.H. Davies	3,367		
Conservative	D.S. Kingsland	2508		
Conservative	R.J. Moseley	2451		
Conservative	M.D. Wunn	2405		
Turnout				
Labour gain from Conservative		Swing		
Labour gain from Conservative		Swing		
Labour gain from Conservative		Swing		

Croydon Council Election 1968: Waddon (3)
Party	Candidate	Votes	%	±%
Conservative	L.J. Young	2,921		
Conservative	D.S. Kingsland	2,892		
Conservative	R.J. Moseley	2,855		
Labour	J.T. Twitchett	1682		
Labour	V. Burgos	1655		
Labour	J.G. Stalley	1512		
National Front	J. Scott	273		
National Front	J.E. Bean	197		
Turnout				
Conservative gain from Labour		Swing		
Conservative gain from Labour		Swing		
Conservative gain from Labour		Swing		

Croydon Council Election 1964: Waddon (3)
Party	Candidate	Votes	%	±%
Labour	V. Burgos	2,708		
Labour	J. T. Twitchett	2,681		
Labour	P. Whitehead	2,651		
Conservative	Mrs. I. A. Bell	2,193		
Conservative	R. Blackford	2,178		
Conservative	L. J. Young	2,139		
Turnout		5,002	43.0	
Labour win (new seat)				
Labour win (new seat)				
Labour win (new seat)				
