= Fairfield (Croydon ward) =

Electoral ward in the London borough of Croydon

Coordinates: 51.3709°N 0.0875°W

- ward for Croydon Council
- Boundary of Fairfield in Croydon from 2018.
- County: Greater London

Current ward
- Created: 1978
- Councillor: Ria Patel (Green)
- Councillor: Chris Clark (Labour)
- Councillor: Esther Sutton (Green)
- Number of councillors: Three
- Created from: Central
- Contributed to new ward(s) of: Park Hill & Whitgift
- UK Parliament constituency: Croydon West

Fairfield is a ward in the London Borough of Croydon in London, in the United Kingdom. Since the 2024 general election, the ward has formed part of the Croydon West parliamentary constituency. The population of the ward at the 2011 Census was 16,569.

The ward returns three councillors every four years. Fairfield contains Croydon town centre, with its retail and office core. Until 2018, it also contained Park Hill and the Whitgift Estate to the east which is mostly 20th century housing bordering Lloyd Park. These became a separate Park Hill and Whitgift ward in 2018, leading to the Fairfield ward having a radically different character to before. Also found in the ward are Ruskin House, the headquarters of the Croydon Labour Party, and the Fairfield Halls concert hall and arts centre. The Vanguard Way passes along the Fairfield Path.

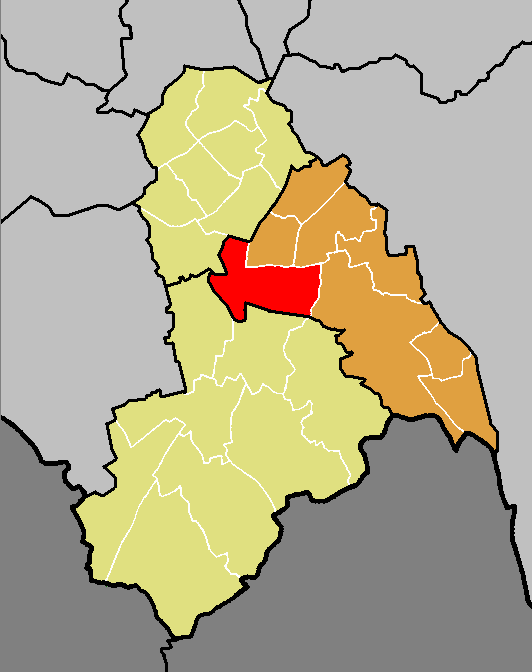
The former Fairfield ward (red) shown within Croydon Central constituency (orange) and the London Borough of Croydon (yellow)

== List of Councillors ==
Election	Councillor	Party	Councillor	Party	Councillor	Party
1978	Ward created					
1978	Bob W. Coatman	Conservative	John L. Aston	Conservative	Peter R. Gilham	Conservative
1982	Bob W. Coatman	Conservative	John L. Aston	Conservative	Michael D. Wunn	Conservative
1994	Bob W. Coatman	Conservative	Richard J. Billington	Conservative	Michael D. Wunn	Conservative
1998	Bob W. Coatman	Conservative	Patricia F. L. Knight	Conservative	Michael D. Wunn	Conservative
2002	Bob W. Coatman	Conservative	Patricia F. L. Knight	Conservative	Audrey-Marie N. Yates	Conservative
July 2002	Bob W. Coatman	Conservative	Patricia F. L. Knight	Labour	Audrey-Marie N. Yates	Conservative
March 2003	Bob W. Coatman	Conservative	Patricia F. L. Knight	Conservative	Audrey-Marie N. Yates	Conservative
2004	Bob W. Coatman	Conservative	Patricia F. L. Knight	Independent	Audrey-Marie N. Yates	Conservative
2005	Bob W. Coatman	Conservative	Patricia F. L. Knight	Liberal Democrat	Audrey-Marie N. Yates	Conservative
2005 by-election	Bob W. Coatman	Conservative	Patricia F. L. Knight	Liberal Democrat	Vidhi Mohan	Conservative
2006	Susan Winborn	Conservative	David Fitze	Conservative	Vidhi Mohan	Conservative
2014	Susan Winborn	Conservative	Helen Pollard	Conservative	Vidhi Mohan	Conservative
2018	Mary Croos	Labour	Chris Clark	Labour	Niroshan Sirisena	Labour
2019 by-election	Mary Croos	Labour	Chris Clark	Labour	Caragh Skipper	Labour
2022	Ria Patel	Green	Chris Clark	Labour	Esther Sutton	Green

== Mayoral election results ==
Below are the results for the candidate which received the highest share of the popular vote in the ward at each mayoral election.

Year	Mayoral Election	Mayoral candidate	Party	Winner?
2004	Mayor of London	Ken Livingstone	Labour	✓
2008	Mayor of London	Boris Johnson	Conservative	✓
2012	Mayor of London	Boris Johnson	Conservative	✓
2016	Mayor of London	Zac Goldsmith	Conservative	✗
2021	Mayor of London	Sadiq Khan	Labour	✓
2022	Mayor of Croydon	Val Shawcross	Labour	✗
2026	Mayor of Croydon	Rowenna Davis	Labour	✗

== Ward results ==
=== 2018 to present ===
Croydon Council Election 2026: Fairfield
Party	Candidate	Votes	%	±%
Green	Ria Patel	1,587	43.7	+6.1
Green	Esther Sutton	1,465	40.3	+3.4
Green	Paul Ainscough	1,452	40.0	
Labour	Davina Brown	1,084	29.8	
Labour	Chris Clark	984	27.1	−10.4
Labour	Cliff Colvin	841	23.2	
Conservative	Steven Jacobs	518	14.3	
Conservative	Peter Jarvis	501	13.8	
Conservative	Hina Amin	479	13.2	
Reform	Ed Marin	378	10.4	
Reform	Jill Thomas	338	9.3	
Liberal Democrats	Michael Hunter	329	9.1	−3.9
Reform	Sujan Mukhiya	313	8.6	
Turnout		3,632	31.06	+6.61
Green hold		Swing		
Green hold		Swing		
Green gain from Labour		Swing		

Croydon Council Election 2022: Fairfield (3)
Party	Candidate	Votes	%	±%
Green	Ria Patel	925		
Labour	Chris Clark*	923		
Green	Esther Sutton	913		
Green	Peter Underwood	890		
Labour	Jose Joseph	883		
Labour	Julie Setchfield	855		
Conservative	Danielle Denton	520		
Conservative	Matthew Dormer	486		
Conservative	Steve Jacobs	448		
Liberal Democrats	Michael Hunter	320		
Liberal Democrats	Syed Mohiuddin	212		
Turnout		2,672	24.45	
Green gain from Labour		Swing		
Labour hold		Swing		
Green gain from Labour		Swing		

Fairfield by-election, 7 November 2019
Party	Candidate	Votes	%	±%
Labour	Caragh Skipper	849	40.8	▼9.7
Conservative	Jayde Edwards	536	25.7	▼4.0
Liberal Democrats	Andrew Rendle	397	19.1	▲10.4
Green	Esther Sutton	237	11.4	▲1.1
Women's Equality	Heather Twindle	40	1.9	N/A
Independent	Mark Samuel	23	1.1	N/A
Majority				
Turnout			22.7	
Labour hold		Swing		

Croydon Council Election 2018: Fairfield (3)
Party	Candidate	Votes	%	±%
Labour	Mary Croos	1,351	18.81	
Labour	Chris Clark	1,329	18.50	
Labour	Niroshan Kantha Sirisena	1,226	17.07	
Conservative	Ben Joce	792	11.02	
Conservative	Philip Richard Smith	753	10.48	
Conservative	Elizabeth Agyepong	750	10.44	
Green	Takudzwa Issaac Chideme	267	3.72	
Green	Alex Gwilt-Cox	266	3.70	
Liberal Democrats	Tomas Foster Garcia de Quiroz	241	3.35	
Liberal Democrats	Alan Edward Reynolds	209	2.91	
Majority		434	6.04	
Turnout				
Labour win (new boundaries)				
Labour win (new boundaries)				
Labour win (new boundaries)				

=== 2002 to 2018 ===
Croydon Council Election 2014: Fairfield
Party	Candidate	Votes	%	±%
Conservative	Vidhi Mohan	2,109		
Conservative	Sue Winborn	2,016		
Conservative	Helen Pollard	1,997		
Labour	Patricia Cummings	1,471		
Labour	Clive Fraser	1,408		
Labour	David Wood	1,363		
UKIP	Daniel Heaton	535		
Green	Timothy Eveleigh	504		
Green	Saima Raza	461		
Green	Jonathan Wharton	397		
Liberal Democrats	Stephanie Offer	282		
Liberal Democrats	Sasha Konechni	273		
Liberal Democrats	Ejnar Sorensen	197		
Majority				
Turnout				
Conservative hold		Swing		
Conservative hold		Swing		
Conservative hold		Swing		

Croydon Council Election 2006: Fairfield
Party	Candidate	Votes	%	±%
Conservative	Vidhi Mohan	2,070		
Conservative	Susan Winborn	2,042		
Conservative	David Fitze	2,010		
Labour	Peter Horah	870		
Labour	Yvonne Gosling	834		
Labour	Dominic O'Donnell	807		
Liberal Democrats	Jill George	640		
Green	Julia Barnsley	629		
UKIP	Edwin Wigley	226		
Monster Raving Loony	John Cartwright	200		
Turnout		3,808	37.6%	
Registered electors		10,127		
Conservative hold		Swing		
Conservative hold		Swing		
Conservative hold		Swing		

Fairfield by-election, 15 December 2005
Party	Candidate	Votes	%	±%
Conservative	Vidhhyacharan R. Mohan	1,459	54.0	+7.8
Labour	Peter N. Horah	871	32.3	−3.8
Liberal Democrats	Michael T. A. Bishopp	223	8.3	−4.1
Green	Bernice C. Golberg	82	3.0	+3.0
The People’s Choice	Holly M. Edmonds	34	1.3	+1.3
Monster Raving Loony	John S. Cartwright	31	1.1	−4.2
Majority		588	21.7	
Turnout		2,700	28.1	
Conservative hold		Swing		

The by-election was called following the resignation of Cllr. Audrey-Marie M. Yates.

Croydon Council Election 2002: Fairfield
Party	Candidate	Votes	%	±%
Conservative	Robert W. Coatman	1,816		
Conservative	Patricia F. L. Knight	1,752		
Conservative	Audrey-Marie N. Yates	1,636		
Labour	Simon A. Hall	1,417		
Labour	Dominic G. O’Donnell	1,381		
Labour	Paul R. M. Dickinson	1,316		
Liberal Democrats	Robert Beadle	486		
Liberal Democrats	Joanna A. Whitehouse	473		
Monster Raving Loony	John S. Cartwright	209		
Majority				
Turnout				
Conservative hold		Swing		
Conservative hold		Swing		
Conservative hold		Swing		

=== 1978 to 2002 ===
Croydon Council Election 1998: Fairfield
Party	Candidate	Votes	%	±%
Conservative	Robert W. Coatman	2,189		
Conservative	Patricia F.L. Knight	2,120		
Conservative	Michael D. Wunn	2,034		
Labour	Dominic G. O’Donnell	1,390		
Labour	Neil McN. Jackson	1,335		
Labour	Paul W. Scott	1,260		
Liberal Democrats	Anthony J. Moss	556		
Liberal Democrats	Mahetabel Hay-Davies	487		
Liberal Democrats	Carl P. Muller	439		
Monster Raving Loony	John S. Cartwright	114		
Majority				
Turnout				
Registered electors				
Conservative hold		Swing		
Conservative hold		Swing		
Conservative hold		Swing		

Croydon Council Election 1994: Fairfield
Party	Candidate	Votes	%	±%
Conservative	Richard J. Billington	2,505		
Conservative	Robert W. Coatman	2,465		
Conservative	Michael D. Wunn	2,359		
Labour	Alexander J. M. Burridge	1,517		
Labour	Robert J. Newman	1,479		
Labour	Richard B. Young	1,434		
Liberal Democrats	Philip H. Barron	809		
Liberal Democrats	Michael G. Gill	757		
Liberal Democrats	Christine T. Hardisty	739		
Chocolate Fudge Cake Party	John S. Cartwright	175		
The People's Choice	Deborah L. Edmonds	108		
Majority		842		
Turnout				
Registered electors				
Conservative hold		Swing		
Conservative hold		Swing		
Conservative hold		Swing		

Croydon Council Election 1990: Fairfield
Party	Candidate	Votes	%	±%
Conservative	John L. Aston	2,943		
Conservative	Robert W. Coatman	2,848		
Conservative	Michael D. Wunn	2,677		
Labour	Maria T. Dennis	1,365		
Labour	Joanna M. Moriarty	1,328		
Labour	John P. Golden	1,292		
Green	William T. Matthews	514		
Liberal Democrats	Philip H. Barron	481		
Liberal Democrats	John M. Jefkins	361		
Liberal Democrats	Roger W. Stephens	351		
SDP	Norman Harris	257		
SDP	Ian Dixie	244		
Majority		1,312		
Turnout				
Registered electors				
Conservative hold		Swing		
Conservative hold		Swing		
Conservative hold		Swing		

Croydon Council Election 1986: Fairfield
Party	Candidate	Votes	%	±%
Conservative	John L. Aston	2,521		
Conservative	Robert W. Coatman	2,483		
Conservative	Michael D. Wunn	2,324		
SDP	Tyrrell Burgess	1,004		
Labour	Stanley L. Eaton	967		
Alliance	Philip H. Barron	952		
Labour	Richard A. Frost	933		
Labour	Vanessa C. Fry	932		
Alliance	Norman Harris	930		
Majority		1,320		
Turnout				
Registered electors				
Conservative hold		Swing		
Conservative hold		Swing		
Conservative hold		Swing		

Croydon Council Election 1982: Fairfield
Party	Candidate	Votes	%	±%
Conservative	John L. Aston	3,195		
Conservative	Robert W. Coatman	3,170		
Conservative	Michael D. Wunn	3,031		
Alliance	Vincent C. Green	1,027		
Alliance	Niccola Swan	984		
Liberal	Desmond J. Stockley	913		
Labour	Frank D.J. Bailey	638		
Labour	Ian E. Chandler	591		
Labour	Edward L. Hall	588		
Turnout				
Conservative hold		Swing		
Conservative hold		Swing		
Conservative hold		Swing		

Croydon Council Election 1978: Fairfield
Party	Candidate	Votes	%	±%
Conservative	Robert W. Coatman, J.P.	3,445		
Conservative	John L. Aston, J.P.	3,436		
Conservative	Peter R. Gilham	3,320		
Labour	Mary E. Curson	925		
Labour	Iain K. Forbes	864		
Labour	Steven Worley	831		
Liberal	John F. Chandler	334		
Liberal	Margaret Slade	322		
Liberal	Kathleen J. Walker	288		
Majority		2,395		
Turnout				
Registered electors				
Conservative win (new seat)				
Conservative win (new seat)				
Conservative win (new seat)				
