= Rylands (ward) =

- Former electoral ward for the Croydon London Borough Council
- Rylands ward boundaries from 1978 to 2002
- Borough: Croydon
- County: Greater London
- Population: 8,081 (1991)
- Electorate: 5,478 (1998)

Former electoral ward
- Created: 1978
- Abolished: 2002
- Councillors: 2
- ONS code: 02AWFR / 00AHFR

Rylands was an electoral ward in the London Borough of Croydon from 1978 to 2002. The ward was first used in the 1978 elections and last used at the 1998 elections. It returned two councillors to Croydon London Borough Council.

== List of councillors ==
Term	Councillor	Party
1978–1982	John Mann	Conservative
1978–1982	Richard Wevill	Conservative
1982–1990	Guy Harding	Conservative
1982–1986	Peter Crockford	Conservative
1986–1990	Keith Wilson	Conservative
1990–1994	Alan Buckfield	Labour
1990–1994	David Petherbridge	Labour
1994–1998	Mark Hourston	Labour
1994–2002	Karen Jewitt	Labour
1998–2002	Louisa Woodley	Labour

== Croydon council elections ==
=== 1998 by-election ===
The by-election took place on 9 July 1998, following the resignation of Louisa Woodley. Woodley was found to have had been ineligible to stand as a candidate in the May 1998 election because she was at that time employed by a local authority school.

1998 Rylands by-election
Party	Candidate	Votes	%	±%
Labour	Louisa Woodley	1,033		
Conservative	George Filbey	623		
Liberal Democrats	Hilary Waterhouse	102		
Monster Raving Loony	John Cartwright	21		
Majority		410		
Turnout		1,779		
Labour hold		Swing		

=== 1998 election ===
The election took place on 7 May 1998.

1998 Croydon London Borough Council election: Rylands
Party	Candidate	Votes	%	±%
Labour	Karen Jewitt	1,323		
Labour	Louisa Woodley	1,115		
Conservative	Colin Gamage	656		
Conservative	Joan North	605		
Majority				
Turnout				
Registered electors				
Labour hold		Swing		
Labour hold		Swing		

=== 1994 election ===
The election took place on 5 May 1994.

1994 Croydon London Borough Council election: Rylands
Party	Candidate	Votes	%	±%
Labour	Mark Hourston	1,693		
Labour	Karen Jewitt	1,625		
Conservative	James Bullen	1,068		
Conservative	Owen Thompson	961		
Registered electors		5,720		
Turnout		2,904		
Rejected ballots		20		
Labour hold		Swing		
Labour hold		Swing		

=== 1990 election ===
The election took place on 3 May 1990.

1990 Croydon London Borough Council election: Rylands
Party	Candidate	Votes	%	±%
Labour	Alan Buckfield	1,488		
Labour	David Petherbridge	1,408		
Conservative	Guy Harding	1,279		
Conservative	Ethel Mann	1,172		
Registered electors				
Turnout				
Labour gain from Conservative		Swing		
Labour gain from Conservative		Swing		

=== 1986 election ===
The election took place on 8 May 1986.

1986 Croydon London Borough Council election: Rylands
Party	Candidate	Votes	%	±%
Conservative	Guy Harding	1,175		
Conservative	Keith Wilson	1,105		
Labour	Patrick Ryan	926		
Labour	Michael Anteney	914		
SDP	Robin Taylor	752		
SDP	Charles Bailey	650		
Majority		179		
Turnout				
Registered electors				
Conservative hold		Swing		
Conservative hold		Swing		

=== 1982 election ===
The election took place on 6 May 1982.

1982 Croydon London Borough Council election: Rylands
Party	Candidate	Votes	%	±%
Conservative	Guy Harding	1,365		
Conservative	Peter Crockford	1,294		
Labour	Robert Brooks	722		
Labour	Philip Durban	678		
SDP	Diana Dawe	488		
Liberal	Joseph Short	273		
Turnout				
Conservative hold		Swing		
Conservative hold		Swing		

=== 1978 election ===
The election took place on 4 May 1978.

1978 Croydon London Borough Council election: Rylands
Party	Candidate	Votes	%	±%
Conservative	John Mann	1,343		
Conservative	Richard Wevill	1,222		
Labour	Stephen Bill	1,140		
Labour	Patricia Knight	1,092		
Liberal	Michael Bethell	133		
Liberal	Maurice Pache	118		
Majority		82		
Turnout				
Registered electors				
Conservative win (new seat)				
Conservative win (new seat)				
