= Purley (ward) =

Former electoral ward in the London Borough of Croydon, England

- Former electoral ward for the Croydon London Borough Council
- Purley ward boundaries from 2002 to 2018
- Borough: Croydon
- County: Greater London
- Population: 14,607 (2011)
- Electorate: 10,925 (1998)
- Major settlements: Purley

Former electoral ward
- Created: 1978
- Abolished: 2018
- Councillors: 3
- Replaced by: Purley and Woodcote; Purley Oaks and Riddlesdown
- ONS code: 00AHGT (2002–2018)
- GSS code: E05000159 (2002–2018)

Purley was an electoral ward in the London Borough of Croydon from 1965 to 2018. The ward was first used in the 1964 elections and last used at the 2014 elections. It returned three councillors to Croydon London Borough Council.

== 2002–2018 Croydon council elections ==
There was a revision of ward boundaries in Croydon in 2002.

=== 2014 election ===
The election took place on 22 May 2014.

2014 Croydon London Borough Council election: Purley
Party	Candidate	Votes	%	±%
Conservative	Simon Brew	2,248		
Conservative	Donald Speakman	1,989		
Conservative	Badsha Quadir	1,878		
Labour	Paola Bagnall	879		
Labour	Peter Horah	842		
Labour	Simbiat Longe	684		
UKIP	Laura Stringer	556		
UKIP	Georgina Guillem	552		
Green	Elizabeth Marsden	443		
Green	Simon Desorgher	409		
Green	Marion Warner	339		
Liberal Democrats	Jill George	312		
Liberal Democrats	Anthony Tucker	295		
Liberal Democrats	Neil Makwana	241		
Majority				
Turnout				
Conservative hold		Swing		
Conservative hold		Swing		
Conservative hold		Swing		

=== 2010 election ===
The election on 6 May 2010 took place on the same day as the United Kingdom general election.

2010 Croydon London Borough Council election: Purley
Party	Candidate	Votes	%	±%
Conservative	Graham Bass	3,573		
Conservative	Donald Speakman	3,328		
Conservative	Badsha Quadir	3,074		
Liberal Democrats	Gordon Burnett	1,495		
Liberal Democrats	Margaret Burnett	1,495		
Labour	Philip Alexander	1,488		
Liberal Democrats	Olive Abdey	1,462		
Labour	Abigail Coombs	1,170		
Labour	Qaiyum Khan	1,126		
UKIP	Kathleen Garner	506		
Green	Anne Martin	466		
Green	Simon Desorgher	391		
Green	Harris Bokhari	372		
Turnout		7,271	68.0%	
Registered electors		10,691		
Conservative hold		Swing		
Conservative hold		Swing		
Conservative hold		Swing		

=== 2006 election ===
The election took place on 4 May 2006.

2006 Croydon London Borough Council election: Purley
Party	Candidate	Votes	%	±%
Conservative	Graham Bass	2,768	53.9	
Conservative	Derek Millard	2,631		
Conservative	Donald Speakman	2,488		
Liberal Democrats	Kathleen Austin	786	15.3	
Labour	Colin Bagnall	700	13.6	
Liberal Democrats	Gordon Burnett	670		
Green	Simon Desorgher	599	11.7	
Labour	Maria Khan	528		
Labour	Suren Pandita	495		
UKIP	Kathleen Garner	280	5.5	
Turnout		4,159	41.0	
Registered electors		10,161		
Conservative hold		Swing		
Conservative hold		Swing		
Conservative hold		Swing		

=== 2002 election ===
The election took place on 2 May 2002.

2002 Croydon London Borough Council election: Purley
Party	Candidate	Votes	%	±%
Conservative	Graham Bass	2,099		
Conservative	Derek Millard	2,056		
Conservative	Donald Speakman	1,985		
Labour	Beata Brooks	696		
Labour	Suren Pandita-Gunawardena	658		
Liberal Democrats	Gordon Burnett	654		
Labour	Barry Paterson	642		
Liberal Democrats	Pamela Randall	604		
Liberal Democrats	Mervyn Gatland	566		
Majority				
Turnout				
Conservative win (new boundaries)				
Conservative win (new boundaries)				
Conservative win (new boundaries)				

== 1978–2002 Croydon council elections ==
Purley ward boundaries from 1978 to 2002

There was a revision of ward boundaries in Croydon in 1978.

=== 1998 election ===
The election took place on 7 May 1998.

1998 Croydon London Borough Council election: Purley
Party	Candidate	Votes	%	±%
Conservative	Graham Bass	2,367		
Conservative	Derek Millard	2,351		
Conservative	Phillip Thomas	2,170		
Labour	Ian Smith	811		
Labour	Douglas Mantell	782		
Liberal Democrats	Sarah Newton	782		
Labour	Kandaswami Parameswaran	759		
Liberal Democrats	Pamela Randall	739		
Liberal Democrats	Jenefer Riley	716		
UKIP	Kathleen Serter	126		
Majority				
Turnout				
Registered electors				
Conservative hold		Swing		
Conservative hold		Swing		
Conservative hold		Swing		
