= Bensham Manor =

Coordinates: 51.397°N 0.105°W

- ward for Croydon Council
- Boundary of Bensham Manor in from 2018.
- County: Greater London

Current ward
- Created: 1965
- Councillor: Humayun Kabir (Labour)
- Councillor: Enid Mollyneaux (Labour)
- Councillor: Eunice O'Dame (Labour)
- Number of councillors: Three
- UK Parliament constituency: Croydon West

Bensham Manor is a ward in the London Borough of Croydon, covering part of the Thornton Heath area of London in the United Kingdom. The ward extends from Thornton Heath railway station westwards and is largely residential with a retail or industrial core. The population of the Ward at the 2011 Census was 16,201.

The ward currently forms part of Sarah Jones MP's Croydon North constituency.

The ward returns three councillors every four years to Croydon Council. At the 2006 Croydon Council election the three Labour Party candidates were elected. One, Councillor Shaw, resigned in 2007 triggering a by-election on 18 February 2007 which was won by Labour's Alison Butler.

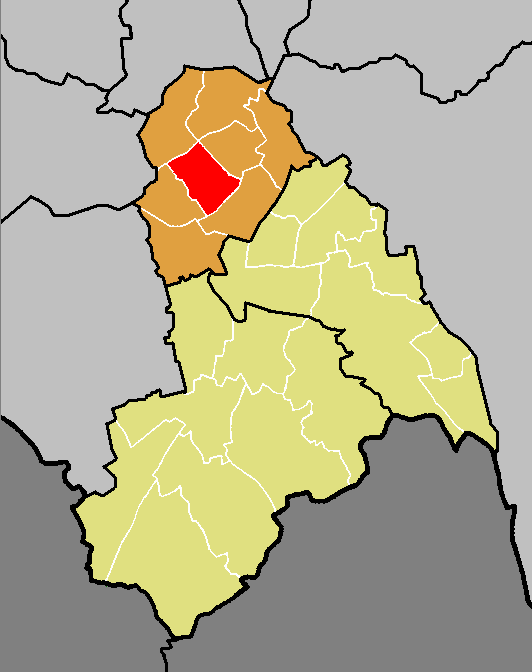
The former Bensham Manor ward (red) shown within Croydon North constituency (orange) and the London Borough of Croydon (yellow)

== List of Councillors ==
Election	Councillor	Party	Councillor	Party	Councillor	Party
1964	Ward created					
1964	F.C. Emmerson	Residents	H.A. Steward	Residents	Ronald J. Bowker	Residents
1971	G.P. Belcher	Labour	Mrs S.E. Lord	Labour	A. Devesar	Labour
1972 By-election	Mrs W.M. Holt	Labour	Mrs S.E. Lord	Labour	A. Devesar	Labour
1974	Ronald J. Bowker	Conservative	Arthur Bourne	Conservative	J.V. Simpson	Conservative
1977 By-election	Ronald J. Bowker	Conservative	Arthur Bourne	Conservative	Christopher B. Wesson	Conservative
1980 By-election	Ronald J. Bowker	Conservative	Ian Smedley	Labour	Christopher B. Wesson	Conservative
1982	Ronald J. Bowker	Conservative	Joan M. Goodman	Conservative	Julia A. Wood	Conservative
1986	Graham A. Dean	Labour	Paul R. Mee	Labour	Hillary A. Key	Labour
1988 By-election	Graham A. Dean	Labour	Paul R. Mee	Labour	Helen S. Salmon	Labour
1990	Alison J. Roberts	Labour	Paul R. Mee	Labour	Helen S. Salmon	Labour
1996 By-election	Paula M. Shaw	Labour	Paul R. Mee	Labour	Helen S. Salmon	Labour
1998	Paula M. Shaw	Labour	Paul R. Mee	Labour	Alexander Burridge	Labour
2002	Paula M. Shaw	Labour	Greta Sohoye	Labour	Alexander Burridge	Labour
2004 By-election	Paula M. Shaw	Labour	Greta Sohoye	Labour	Nanoo Rajendran	Labour
2007 By-election	Alison Butler	Labour	Greta Sohoye	Labour	Nanoo Rajendran	Labour
2009	Alison Butler	Labour	Greta Sohoye	Conservative	Nanoo Rajendran	Labour
2010	Alison Butler	Labour	Donna Gray	Labour	Nanoo Rajendran	Labour
2014	Alison Butler	Labour	Jamie Audsley	Labour	Humayun Kabir	Labour
2022	Enid Mollyneaux	Labour	Eunice O'Dame	Labour	Humayun Kabir	Labour
2026	Ellie Sandover	Labour	Mohana Manoharan	Labour	Humayun Kabir	Labour

== Mayoral election results ==
Below are the results for the candidate which received the highest share of the popular vote in the ward at each mayoral election.

Year	Mayoralty	Mayoral candidate	Party	Winner?
2004	Mayor of London	Ken Livingstone	Labour	✓
2008	Mayor of London	Ken Livingstone	Labour	✗
2012	Mayor of London	Ken Livingstone	Labour	✗
2016	Mayor of London	Sadiq Khan	Labour	✓
2021	Mayor of London	Sadiq Khan	Labour	✓
2022	Mayor of Croydon	Val Shawcross	Labour	✗
2026	Mayor of Croydon	Rowenna Davis	Labour	✗

== Ward Result ==
Croydon Council Election 2026: Bensham Manor (3)
Party	Candidate	Votes	%	±%
Labour Co-op	Humayun Kabir	1,370	35.6	−21.0
Labour Co-op	Mohana Manoharan	1,277	33.2	
Labour Co-op	Ellie Sandover	1,233	32.0	
Green	Caraden Davis	1,037	26.9	
Green	Simon Jones	914	23.7	
Green	Gareth Main	838	21.8	
Independent	Graham Mitchell	622	16.2	−3.0
Conservative	Graeme Fillmore	560	14.5	
Conservative	Gisela James	556	14.4	
Conservative	Jon Sanders	512	13.3	
Liberal Democrats	Ashley Burridge	410	10.6	
Reform	Ben Flook	396	10.3	
Reform	Gay Holder	320	8.3	
Reform	Akintunde Ogunlolu	258	6.7	
Workers Party	Syed Abidi	186	4.8	
Turnout		10,513	32.80	+4.63
Labour Co-op hold		Swing		
Labour Co-op hold		Swing		
Labour Co-op hold		Swing		

Croydon Council Election 2022: Bensham Manor (3)
Party	Candidate	Votes	%	±%
Labour Co-op	Humayan Kabir*	1,616	18.9	
Labour	Enid Mollyneaux	1,577	18.4	
Labour	Eunice O'Dame	1,530	17.9	
Conservative	Joyce Bright	599	7.0	
Independent	Graham Mitchell	548	6.4	
Conservative	John Newberry	519	6.1	
Conservative	Dev Parashar	458	5.3	
Green	Vinod Birdi	424	4.9	
Green	Clifford Fleming	372	4.3	
Green	Alex Raskovic	331	3.9	
Taking the Initiative	Renata Allman	257	3.0	
Taking the Initiative	Carl Collins	168	2.0	
Taking the Initiative	Jayson Miller	167	1.9	
Turnout		3,247	28.17	
Labour hold		Swing		
Labour hold		Swing		
Labour hold		Swing		

Croydon Council Election 2018: Bensham Manor (3)
Party	Candidate	Votes	%	±%
Labour	Alison Jane Butler	2,665	25.05	
Labour	Jamie Audsley	2,652	24.93	
Labour	Humayun Kabir	2,546	23.93	
Conservative	Alan James Bowden	726	6.82	
Conservative	Kumari Anupama	568	5.34	
Conservative	Jebun Quadir	472	4.44	
Green	Varyl Robert Thorndycraft	367	3.45	
Green	Pravina Ellis	332	3.12	
Green	Raj Mehta	311	2.92	
Majority		1,820	17.11	
Turnout				
Labour hold		Swing		
Labour hold		Swing		
Labour hold		Swing		

Bensham Manor (3) - 2006
Party	Candidate	Votes	%	±%
Labour	Raj Rajendran	1,846		
Labour	Paula Shaw	1,805		
Labour	Greta Sohoye	1,670		
Conservative	Roger Taylor	1,117		
Conservative	John Tooze	861		
Conservative	Alan Winborn	774		
Green	Susan Parsons	531		
UKIP	James Feisenberger	305		
Turnout		3,407	32.9%	
