= Beulah (ward) =

- Former electoral ward for the Croydon London Borough Council
- Beulah ward boundaries from 1978 to 2002
- Borough: Croydon
- County: Greater London
- Population: 8,868 (1991)
- Electorate: 6,050 (1998)

Former electoral ward
- Created: 1978
- Abolished: 2002
- Councillors: 2
- ONS code: 02AWFD / 00AHFD

Beulah was an electoral ward in the London Borough of Croydon from 1978 to 2002. The ward was first used in the 1978 elections and last used at the 1998 elections. It returned two councillors to Croydon London Borough Council.

== List of councillors ==
Term	Councillor	Party
1978–1990	Philomena Brown	Conservative
1978–1989	Klemens Zdanowicz	Conservative
1989–1990	Ruth McNerney	Labour
1990–1994	Michael Fisher	Conservative
1990–1994	Steven Hollands	Conservative
1994–2002	Roy Grantham	Labour
1994	Sherwan Chowdhury	Labour
1994–2002	Hugh Malyan	Labour

== Croydon council elections ==
=== 1998 election ===
The election took place on 7 May 1998.

1998 Croydon London Borough Council election: Beulah
Party	Candidate	Votes	%	±%
Labour	Roy Grantham	1,368		
Labour	Hugh Malyan	1,330		
Conservative	Jonathan Bearman	1,131		
Conservative	Gloria Hutchens	1,087		
Liberal Democrats	Jonathan Cope	240		
Majority				
Turnout				
Registered electors				
Labour hold		Swing		
Labour hold		Swing		

=== 1994 by-election ===
The by-election took place on 8 December 1994, following the resignation Sherwan Chowdhury.

1994 Beulah by-election
Party	Candidate	Votes	%	±%
Labour	Hugh Malyan	1,338	63.2	
Conservative	Michael Fisher	625	29.5	
Liberal Democrats	Christopher Pocock	132	6.2	
Green	Bruce Horner	21	1.0	
Majority		713	33.7	
Turnout		2,116	33.2	
Labour hold		Swing		

=== 1994 election ===
The election took place on 5 May 1994.

1994 Croydon London Borough Council election: Beulah
Party	Candidate	Votes	%	±%
Labour	Roy Grantham	1,471	46.17	
Labour	Sherwan Chowdhury	1,454		
Conservative	Michael Fisher	1,365	41.87	
Conservative	Steven Hollands	1,289		
Liberal Democrats	Jonathan Cope	402	11.96	
Liberal Democrats	Christopher Pocock	356		
Registered electors		6,344		
Turnout		3,336	52.59	
Rejected ballots		7	0.21	
Labour gain from Conservative		Swing		
Labour gain from Conservative		Swing		

=== 1990 election ===
The election took place on 3 May 1990.

1990 Croydon London Borough Council election: Beulah
Party	Candidate	Votes	%	±%
Conservative	Michael Fisher	1,442	45.23	
Conservative	Steven Hollands	1,413		
Labour	Ruth McNerney	1,342	39.91	
Labour	David Turner	1,177		
Liberal Democrats	Leo C. E. Held	244	7.73	
Green	Laura M. Hooton	225	7.13	
Registered electors		6,477		
Turnout		3146	48.57	
Rejected ballots		4	0.13	
Conservative hold		Swing		
Conservative gain from Labour		Swing		

=== 1989 by-election ===
The by-election was held on 31 August 1989, following the resignation of Klemens Zdanowicz.

1989 Beulah by-election
Party	Candidate	Votes	%	±%
Labour	Ruth McNerney	1,312		
Conservative	Michael Fisher	918		
Liberal Democrats	Leo Held	118		
Green	Sylvia Matthews	73		
Majority				
Turnout				
Labour gain from Conservative		Swing		

=== 1986 election ===
The election took place on 8 May 1986.

1986 Croydon London Borough Council election: Beulah
Party	Candidate	Votes	%	±%
Conservative	Philomena Brown	1,510		
Conservative	Klemens Zdanowicz	1,447		
Labour	Martin Kender	787		
Labour	Joy Laing	720		
SDP	Julie Armitage	516		
Liberal	Trevor Barker	508		
Majority		660		
Turnout				
Registered electors				
Conservative hold		Swing		
Conservative hold		Swing		

=== 1982 election ===
The election took place on 6 May 1982.

1982 Croydon London Borough Council election: Beulah
Party	Candidate	Votes	%	±%
Conservative	Philomena Brown	1,815		
Conservative	Klemens Zdanowicz	1,751		
SDP	Graham Williams	613		
Liberal	Anthony Everett	598		
Labour	Alice Tyrell	495		
Labour	Roger Borne	479		
Turnout				
Conservative hold		Swing		
Conservative hold		Swing		

=== 1978 election ===
The election took place on 4 May 1978.

1978 Croydon London Borough Council election: Beulah
Party	Candidate	Votes	%	±%
Conservative	Philomena Brown	1,993		
Conservative	Klemens Zdanowicz	1,849		
Labour	Doris George	652		
Labour	William Johnson	596		
Liberal	Brigid Hurn	171		
Liberal	Peter Austin			
Majority		1,197		
Turnout			42.1	
Registered electors		6,988		
Conservative win (new seat)				
Conservative win (new seat)				
