= 2006 Croydon London Borough Council election =

2006 local election in England

Croydon Council Election, 2006
- 4 May 2006

All 70 seats to Croydon London Borough Council 36 seats needed for a majority
	First party	Second party
Leader	Mike Fisher	Tony Newman
Party	Conservative	Labour
Leader since	2005	2005
Leader's seat	Shirley	Woodside
Last election	32 seats, 45.2%	37 seats, 38.0%
Seats won	43	27
Seat change	▲11	▼10
Popular vote	49,341	28,534
Percentage	44.8%	25.9%
Swing	▼0.4%	▼12.1%
- Map of the results of the 2006 Croydon council election. Conservatives in blue and Labour in red.
Leader of the Council before election
Tony Newman
Labour
Elected Leader
Mike Fisher
Conservative

Elections to Croydon Council in London, England were held on 4 May 2006. The whole council was up for election for the first time since the 2002 election. The Labour Party lost control of the council to the Conservative Party for the first time since 1994.

There are 24 wards which represent Croydon Council. All Croydon Council seats were up for re-election for the first time since the 2002 elections, during the election on 4 May 2006. Previously Labour held control of the council. In the election, the Conservatives took 10 seats from Labour and 1 from the Liberal Democrats. Since the election, there was a defection of a Labour councillor to the Conservatives.

== Election result ==
Croydon local election result 2006
Party	Seats	Gains	Losses	Net gain/loss	Seats %	Votes %	Votes	+/−
Conservative	43	11	0	+11	61.4	44.8	49,341	-0.4
Labour	27	0	10	-10	38.6	25.9	28,534	-12.1
Liberal Democrats	0	0	1	-1	0.0	13.4	14,778	+1.2
Green	0	0	0	0	0.0	9.2	10,165	+8.9
UKIP	0	0	0	0	0.0	3.1	3,405	+2.0
BNP	0	0	0	0	0.0	1.3	1,464	N/A
Independent	0	0	0	0	0.0	1.0	1,083	-0.7
Pensions Action Alliance	0	0	0	0	0.0	0.4	406	N/A
People's Choice	0	0	0	0	0.0	0.3	281	-0.9
Croydon Ratepayers Against Croydon Council	0	0	0	0	0.0	0.2	229	N/A
Communist	0	0	0	0	0.0	0.2	177	N/A

=== Political make-up ===
Party political make-up of Croydon Council
Party	Seats		Current Council
Party	2002	2006	Current Council
Conservatives	31	43	
Labour	37	27	
Lib Dems	1	0	

== Ward results ==
=== A-C ===
==== Addiscombe ====
Addiscombe (3)
Party	Candidate	Votes	%	±%
Conservative	Andrew Price	1,948	37.2	
Conservative	Maria de la Huerta	1,842		
Conservative	Russell Jackson	1,793		
Labour	Sean Fitzsimons	1,672	32.0	
Labour	Amanda Campbell	1,653		
Labour	Mark Watson	1,607		
Green	Mario Barnsley	850	16.3	
Liberal Democrats	Paul Rogers	760	14.5	
Majority		170		
Turnout		4,437	40.0	
Registered electors		11,087		
Conservative gain from Labour		Swing		
Conservative gain from Labour		Swing		
Conservative gain from Labour		Swing		

==== Ashburton ====
Ashburton (3)
Party	Candidate	Votes	%	±%
Conservative	Lindsay Frost	2,513	49.4	
Conservative	Eddy Arram	2,431		
Conservative	Avril Slipper	2,390		
Labour	Rona MacDonald	1,057	20.8	
Labour	Peter Spalding	971		
Labour	Jitinder Singh	904		
Green	Bernice Golberg	628	12.4	
Liberal Democrats	Nirma Ramful	550	10.8	
UKIP	Jeanette Nathan	336	6.6	
Majority		1,333		
Turnout		4,324	42.7	
Registered electors		10,115		
Conservative hold		Swing		
Conservative hold		Swing		
Conservative hold		Swing		

==== Bensham Manor ====
Bensham Manor (3)
Party	Candidate	Votes	%	±%
Labour	Raj Rajendran	1,846	48.0	
Labour	Paula Shaw	1,805		
Labour	Greta Sohoye	1,670		
Conservative	Roger Taylor	1,117	29.0	
Conservative	John Tooze	861		
Conservative	Alan Winborn	774		
Green	Susan Parsons	581	15.1	
UKIP	James Feisenberger	305	7.9	
Turnout		3,407	32.9	
Registered electors		10,333		
Labour hold		Swing		
Labour hold		Swing		
Labour hold		Swing		

==== Broad Green ====
Broad Green (3)
Party	Candidate	Votes	%	±%
Labour	Stuart Collins	1,777	50.2	
Labour	Mike Selva	1,600		
Labour	Manju Shahul-Hameed	1,576		
Conservative	Ian Parker	1,076	30.4	
Conservative	Patrick Ratnaraja	1,073		
Conservative	Jill Thomas	975		
Liberal Democrats	Syed Mohiuddin	513	14.5	
Communist	Peter Latham	177	5.0	
Turnout		3,426	31.5	
Registered electors		10,885		
Labour hold		Swing		
Labour hold		Swing		
Labour hold		Swing		

==== Coulsdon East ====
Coulsdon East (3)
Party	Candidate	Votes	%	±%
Conservative	Christopher Wright	3,393	61.5	
Conservative	Brian Udell	3,321		
Conservative	Terry Lenton	3,102		
Liberal Democrats	Ian Atkins	2,124	38.5	
Liberal Democrats	Simon Hargrave	1,817		
Liberal Democrats	Patricia Knight	1,765		
Turnout		5,350	56.8	
Registered electors		9,412		
Conservative gain from Liberal Democrats		Swing		
Conservative hold		Swing		
Conservative hold		Swing		

==== Coulsdon West ====
Coulsdon West (3)
Party	Candidate	Votes	%	±%
Conservative	David Osland	2,706	59.4	
Conservative	Gavin Barwell	2,685		
Conservative	Brian Cakebread	2,640		
Liberal Democrats	Avril Bristow	775	17.0	
Liberal Democrats	Jean Callen	745		
Liberal Democrats	Brian Glaister	627		
Labour	Sarah Ward	481	10.6	
Labour	Richard Ackland	475		
Labour	Lee Findell	435		
Green	Andrew Lindsay	429	9.4	
The People's Choice	Sheila Lockwood	168	3.7	
Turnout		4,226	42.8	
Registered electors				
Conservative hold		Swing		
Conservative hold		Swing		
Conservative hold		Swing		

==== Croham ====
Croham (3)
Party	Candidate	Votes	%	±%
Conservative	Maria Gatland	2,590	51.2	
Conservative	Michael Neal	2,418		
Conservative	Jason Perry	2,378		
Liberal Democrats	Michael Bishopp	861	17.0	
Liberal Democrats	Sheelagh Crampton	739		
Labour	Laura Doughty	722	14.3	
Labour	Paul Anderson	697		
Liberal Democrats	Edward Maxfield	609		
Green	Stephen Harris	569	11.2	
Labour	James Mburu	566		
UKIP	William Bailey	206	4.1	
The People's Choice	Evelyn Lane	113	2.2	
The People's Choice	Debra Cannam	112		
The People's Choice	Mark Samuel	96		
Turnout		4,460	41.4	
Registered electors		10,785		
Conservative hold		Swing		
Conservative hold		Swing		
Conservative hold		Swing		

=== F-N ===
==== Fairfield ====
Fairfield (3)
Party	Candidate	Votes	%	±%
Conservative	Vidhi Mohan	2,070	44.7	
Conservative	Susan Winborn	2,042		
Conservative	David Fitze	2,010		
Labour	Peter Horah	870	18.8	
Labour	Yvonne Gosling	834		
Labour	Dominic O'Donnell	807		
Liberal Democrats	Jill George	640	13.8	
Green	Julia Barnsley	629	13.6	
UKIP	Edwin Wigley	226	4.9	
Monster Raving Loony	John Cartwright	200	4.3	
Turnout		3,808	37.6	
Registered electors		10,127		
Conservative hold		Swing		
Conservative hold		Swing		
Conservative hold		Swing		

==== Fieldway ====
Fieldway (2)
Party	Candidate	Votes	%	±%
Labour	Simon Hall	949	35.1	
Labour	Carole Bonner	862		
BNP	Matthew Bedford	692	25.6	
Conservative	Roland Petit	667	24.7	
Conservative	Andrew Stranack	477		
UKIP	Lynnda Robson	213	7.9	
Liberal Democrats	Heather Jefkins	180	6.7	
Turnout		2,293	34.2	
Registered electors		6,697		
Labour hold		Swing		
Labour hold		Swing		

==== Heathfield ====
Heathfield (3)
Party	Candidate	Votes	%	±%
Conservative	Margaret Mead	3,076	62.7	
Conservative	Helen Pollard	2,936		
Conservative	Enley Taylor	2,749		
Labour	Sarah Jones	761	15.5	
Liberal Democrats	Stephen Cleary	654	13.3	
Labour	Moira O'Donnell	642		
Labour	Romney Tansley	598		
Liberal Democrats	Peter Ladanyi	529		
UKIP	Andrew Paice	411	8.4	
Turnout		4,405	44.7	
Registered electors		9,863		
Conservative hold		Swing		
Conservative hold		Swing		
Conservative hold		Swing		

==== Kenley ====
Kenley (3)
Party	Candidate	Votes	%	±%
Conservative	Jan Buttinger	2,631	57.5	
Conservative	Steve O'Connell	2,530		
Conservative	Steve Hollands	2,523		
Liberal Democrats	Angela Catto	757	16.5	
Green	Tom Voute	729	15.9	
Liberal Democrats	Linda Evans	650		
Labour	Joy Prince	461	10.1	
Labour	Mohammed Mir	406		
Turnout		4,367	41.7	
Registered electors		10,473		
Conservative hold		Swing		
Conservative hold		Swing		
Conservative hold		Swing		

==== New Addington ====
New Addington (2)
Party	Candidate	Votes	%	±%
Labour	Brenda Kirby	1,356	38.0	
Labour	George Ayres	1,257		
Conservative	Peter Kirby	1,046	29.3	
Conservative	Anthony Pearson	1,040		
BNP	Clifford May	772	21.6	
UKIP	Ian Edwards	256	7.2	
Liberal Democrats	Stephanie Offer	139	3.9	
Turnout		3,228	44.8	
Registered electors		7,198		
Labour hold		Swing		
Labour hold		Swing		

==== Norbury ====
Norbury (3)
Party	Candidate	Votes	%	±%
Labour	Maggie Mansell	2,434	46.4	
Labour	Shafi Khan	2,428		
Labour	Sherwan Chowdhury	2,333		
Conservative	Gloria Hutchens	1,751	33.4	
Conservative	Tirena Gunter	1,679		
Conservative	Adam Kellett	1,557		
Liberal Democrats	Leo Held	553	10.5	
Green	Michael O'Sullivan	511	9.7	
Turnout		4,784	43.6	
Registered electors		10,978		
Labour hold		Swing		
Labour hold		Swing		
Labour hold		Swing		

=== P-S ===
==== Purley ====
Purley (3)
Party	Candidate	Votes	%	±%
Conservative	Graham Bass	2,768	53.9	
Conservative	Derek Millard	2,631		
Conservative	Donald Speakman	2,488		
Liberal Democrats	Kathleen Austin	786	15.3	
Labour	Colin Bagnall	700	13.6	
Liberal Democrats	Gordon Burnett	670		
Green	Simon Desorgher	599	11.7	
Labour	Maria Khan	528		
Labour	Suren Pandita	495		
UKIP	Kathleen Garner	280	5.5	
Turnout		4,159	41.0	
Registered electors		10,161		
Conservative hold		Swing		
Conservative hold		Swing		
Conservative hold		Swing		

==== Sanderstead ====
Sanderstead (3)
Party	Candidate	Votes	%	±%
Conservative	Lynne Hale	3,567	72.7	
Conservative	Timothy Pollard	3,470		
Conservative	Yvette Hopley	3,447		
Liberal Democrats	Anne Howard	570	11.6	
Liberal Democrats	Susan Gauge	562		
Labour	Daniel Harvey	429	8.7	
Labour	Barry Buttigieg	393		
Labour	Tejinder Madhar	369		
UKIP	Alan Smith	338	6.9	
Turnout		4,700	48.6	
Registered electors		9,663		
Conservative hold		Swing		
Conservative hold		Swing		
Conservative hold		Swing		

==== Selhurst ====
Selhurst (3)
Party	Candidate	Votes	%	±%
Labour	Timothy Godfrey	1,652	44.5	
Labour	Toni Letts	1,597		
Labour	Gerry Ryan	1,452		
Conservative	Margaret Bird	906	24.4	
Conservative	Audrey Terrey	893		
Conservative	William Proudfoot	861		
Green	Megan Braid-Pittordou	588	15.8	
Liberal Democrats	Lynn Roulstone	570	15.3	
Turnout		3,220	31.4	
Registered electors		10,259		
Labour hold		Swing		
Labour hold		Swing		
Labour hold		Swing		

==== Selsdon and Ballards ====
Selsdon and Ballards (3)
Party	Candidate	Votes	%	±%
Conservative	Sara Bashford	3,396	67.9	
Conservative	Dudley Mead	3,357		
Conservative	Phil Thomas	3,215		
Liberal Democrats	John Jefkins	651	13.0	
Liberal Democrats	Margaret Burnett	625		
Labour	Peter Hopson	535	10.7	
Labour	Rae Goonetilleke	451		
UKIP	Claire Smith	416	8.3	
Labour	Femi Yusoof	373		
Turnout		4,719	50.4	
Registered electors		9,355		
Conservative hold		Swing		
Conservative hold		Swing		
Conservative hold		Swing		

==== Shirley ====
Shirley (3)
Party	Candidate	Votes	%	±%
Conservative	Janet Marshall	3,270	50.8	
Conservative	Richard Chatterjee	2,924		
Conservative	Mike Fisher	2,888		
Independent	Marzia Nicodemi-Ehikioya	1,083	16.8	
Labour	Norman Glass	896	13.9	
Labour	Mark Justice	869		
Labour	Lorraine Walters	799		
Liberal Democrats	Paul West	603	9.4	
Green	Ian Dixon	590	9.2	
Turnout		5,014	48.1	
Registered electors		10,422		
Conservative hold		Swing		
Conservative hold		Swing		
Conservative hold		Swing		

==== South Norwood ====
South Norwood (3)
Party	Candidate	Votes	%	±%
Conservative	Susan Bennett	1,670	34.8	
Conservative	Luke Clancy	1,523		
Labour	Jane Avis	1,492	31.1	
Labour	Kathy Bee	1.393		
Labour	Andy Bagnall	1,385		
Conservative	Mohammed Quadir	1,271		
Green	Tim Fernandes-Bonnar	717	14.9	
Liberal Democrats	Julie Hardy-McBride	684	14.3	
Liberal Democrats	Jan Perry	616		
UKIP	Brian Hutchings	233	4.9	
Turnout		3,997	37.2	
Registered electors		10,732		
Conservative gain from Labour		Swing		
Conservative gain from Labour		Swing		
Labour hold		Swing		

=== T-W ===
==== Thornton Heath ====
Thornton Heath (3)
Party	Candidate	Votes	%	±%
Labour	Pat Clouder	1,644	43.6	
Labour	Matthew Kyeremeh	1,427		
Labour	Louisa Woodley	1,421		
Conservative	Florence Evans	902	23.9	
Conservative	Melanie Hutchens	833		
Liberal Democrats	Jonathan Cope	819	21.7	
Conservative	Michele O'Connell	776		
Liberal Democrats	Stephen Dering	697		
Liberal Democrats	Tomas Howard-Jones	638		
Green	Michael Tink	408	10.8	
Turnout		3,445	31.5	
Registered electors		10,920		
Labour hold		Swing		
Labour hold		Swing		
Labour hold		Swing		

==== Upper Norwood ====
Upper Norwood (3)
Party	Candidate	Votes	%	±%
Conservative	Robert Askey	1,650	39.2	
Labour	Pat Ryan	1,637	38.9	
Conservative	George Filbey	1,566		
Labour	Alisa Flemming	1,561		
Conservative	Clare Hilley	1,489		
Labour	Ian Payne	1,461		
Green	Anna Martin	732	17.4	
Green	Shasha Khan	729		
Green	Tom Real	527		
UKIP	Joan Tyndall	185	4.4	
Turnout		4,092	37.9	
Registered electors		10,795		
Conservative gain from Labour		Swing		
Labour hold		Swing		
Conservative gain from Labour		Swing		

==== Waddon ====
Waddon (3)
Party	Candidate	Votes	%	±%
Conservative	Tony Harris	2,335	43.3	
Conservative	Jonathan Driver	2,285		
Conservative	Simon Hoar	2,215		
Labour	Alison Butler	2,040	37.8	
Labour	Charlotte McAree	1,973		
Labour	Paul Smith	1,942		
Green	Mary Davey	485	9.0	
Liberal Democrats	Valerie Hargrave	402	7.4	
Liberal Democrats	Geoffrey Gauge	395		
Pensions Action Alliance	Eileen Daisley	135	2.5	
Pensions Action Alliance	Alan Crawley	133		
Pensions Action Alliance	Helen Crawley	117		
Turnout		5,077	45.8	
Registered electors		11,096		
Conservative gain from Labour		Swing		
Conservative gain from Labour		Swing		
Conservative gain from Labour		Swing		

==== West Thornton ====
West Thornton (3)
Party	Candidate	Votes	%	±%
Labour	Raj Chandarana	1,660	42.5	
Labour	Bernadette Khan	1,521		
Labour	Mike Mogul	1,387		
Conservative	Christina Blair	1,115	28.6	
Conservative	Mehmet Bezginsoy	919		
Conservative	Bilgin Duven	916		
Liberal Democrats	Mahmud Ahsanollah	590	15.1	
Green	Santheya Natarajan	539	13.8	
Turnout		3,386	31.4	
Registered electors		10,790		
Labour hold		Swing		
Labour hold		Swing		
Labour hold		Swing		

==== Woodside ====
Woodside (3)
Party	Candidate	Votes	%	±%
Labour	Karen Jewitt	1,463	33.9	
Labour	Tony Newman	1,415		
Labour	Paul Scott	1,225		
Conservative	Benjamin Grainger	1,178	27.3	
Conservative	Desmond Wright	1,059		
Conservative	Stephen Ghero	987		
Liberal Democrats	Patricia West	597	13.8	
Green	Ivonne Fernandes-Bonnar	581	13.5	
Pensions Action Alliance	David Young	271	6.3	
Croydon Ratepayers Against Croydon Council	Colin Cole	229	5.3	
Pensions Action Alliance	Daphne Akeroyd	211		
Pensions Action Alliance	John Akeroyd	168		
Turnout		3,485	33.8	
Registered electors		10,314		
Labour hold		Swing		
Labour hold		Swing		
Labour hold		Swing		
