= Heathfield (Croydon ward) =

Electoral ward in London, England

- Former electoral ward for the Croydon London Borough Council
- Borough: Croydon
- County: Greater London

Former electoral ward
- Created: 1978
- Abolished: 2018
- Seats: 3

Heathfield was an electoral ward in the London Borough of Croydon.

== Political history ==
Heathfield was considered an ultra-safe Conservative ward.

== Elections ==
Heathfield (3)
Party	Candidate	Votes	%	±%
Conservative	Margaret Mead	2,048	48.1	
Conservative	Jason Cummings	2,026	47.5	
Conservative	Andy Stranack	1,778	41.7	
UKIP	Crispin Hardy	1,185	27.8	
Labour	Peter Spaulding	1,154	27.1	
Labour	Angela Collins	936	22.0	
Labour	Robert Elliott	795	18.7	
Green	Yasmin Halai-Carter	344	8.1	
Green	Christopher Warner	334	7.8	
Liberal Democrats	Andrew Bennett	296	6.9	
BNP	Michael Collard	258	6.1	
Green	Christopher Whitrow	224	5.3	
Majority				
Turnout		4,262	42.0	
Conservative hold		Swing		
Conservative hold		Swing		
Conservative hold		Swing		

== See also ==
- List of electoral wards in Greater London
