= Norbury (Croydon ward) =

Former electoral ward in the London Borough of Croydon

- Former electoral ward for the Croydon London Borough Council
- Norbury ward boundaries from 2002 to 2018
- Borough: Croydon
- County: Greater London
- Population: 16,476 (2011)
- Electorate: 8,711 (1998)
- Major settlements: Norbury

Former electoral ward
- Created: 1978
- Abolished: 2018
- Councillors: 3
- Replaced by: Norbury and Pollards Hill; Norbury Park
- ONS code: 00AHGS (2002–2018)
- GSS code: E05000158 (2002–2018)

Norbury was an electoral ward in the London Borough of Croydon from 1965 to 2018. The ward was first used in the 1964 elections and last used at the 2014 elections. It returned three councillors to Croydon London Borough Council.

== 2002–2018 Croydon council elections ==
There was a revision of ward boundaries in Croydon in 2002.

=== 2014 election ===
The election took place on 22 May 2014.

2014 Croydon London Borough Council election: Norbury
Party	Candidate	Votes	%	±%
Labour	Maggie Mansell	2,227		
Labour	Sherwan Chowdhury	2,221		
Labour	Shafi Khan	2,134		
Conservative	Tirena Gunter	1,045		
Conservative	Gurmit Singh	982		
Conservative	Ben Flook	945		
UKIP	Rachel Hunte	422		
UKIP	Przemek de Skuba Skwirczynski	356		
Green	Douglas Arrowsmith	321		
Green	Raj Mehta	312		
Green	Marie Norfield	305		
Liberal Democrats	Anne Viney	220		
Independent	Winston Kennedy	47		
Majority				
Turnout				
Labour hold		Swing		
Labour hold		Swing		
Labour hold		Swing		

=== 2010 election ===
The election on 6 May 2010 took place on the same day as the United Kingdom general election.

2010 Croydon London Borough Council election: Norbury
Party	Candidate	Votes	%	±%
Labour	Sherwan Chowdhury	3,666		
Labour	Shafi Khan	3,586		
Labour	Maggie Mansell	3,551		
Conservative	Mike Mogul	2,315		
Conservative	Walter Ross Gower	2,061		
Conservative	Sherman Quintyn	1,974		
Liberal Democrats	Rosemary Aselford	1,480		
Green	Elizabeth De Zoysa	558		
Green	Simon Holland	459		
Green	Stefan Szczelkun	259		
Turnout		7,210	61.7%	
Registered electors		11,682		
Labour hold		Swing		
Labour hold		Swing		
Labour hold		Swing		

=== 2006 election ===
The election took place on 4 May 2006.

2006 Croydon London Borough Council election: Norbury
Party	Candidate	Votes	%	±%
Labour	Maggie Mansell	2,434	46.4	
Labour	Shafi Khan	2,428		
Labour	Sherwan Chowdhury	2,333		
Conservative	Gloria Hutchens	1,751	33.4	
Conservative	Tirena Gunter	1,679		
Conservative	Adam Kellett	1,557		
Liberal Democrats	Leo Held	553	10.5	
Green	Michael O'Sullivan	511	9.7	
Turnout		4,784	43.6	
Registered electors		10,978		
Labour hold		Swing		
Labour hold		Swing		
Labour hold		Swing		

=== 2002 election ===
The election took place on 2 May 2002.

2002 Croydon London Borough Council election: Norbury
Party	Candidate	Votes	%	±%
Labour	Margaret Mansell	2,254		
Labour	Shafi Khan	2,227		
Labour	Peter Hopson	2,147		
Conservative	Susan Bennett	2,014		
Conservative	Gloria Hutchens	2,004		
Conservative	Rukhsana Sheikh	1,885		
Independent	Frederick Sherlock	652		
Majority				
Turnout				
Labour win (new boundaries)				
Labour win (new boundaries)				
Labour win (new boundaries)				

== 1978–2002 Croydon council elections ==
Norbury ward boundaries from 1978 to 2002

There was a revision of ward boundaries in Croydon in 1978.

=== 1998 election ===
The election took place on 7 May 1998.

1998 Croydon London Borough Council election: Norbury
Party	Candidate	Votes	%	±%
Labour	Margaret Mansell	1,858		
Labour	Peter Hopson	1,796		
Labour	Shafi Khan	1,793		
Conservative	Bryan Kendall	1,651		
Conservative	Alan Mason	1,548		
Conservative	Madeleine Marvier	1,516		
Liberal Democrats	David Armer	397		
Liberal Democrats	Peter Scott	358		
Liberal Democrats	Robert Silver	241		
Majority				
Turnout				
Registered electors				
Labour hold		Swing		
Labour hold		Swing		
Labour hold		Swing		
