= South Norwood (ward) =

Electoral ward in the London Borough of Croydon

- ward for Croydon Council
- Boundary of South Norwood in Croydon from 2018.
- County: Greater London
- Electorate: ~10,217

Current ward
- Created: 1965
- Councillor: Tracey Hague (Green)
- Councillor: Melanie Felten (Labour)
- Councillor: Martyn Post (Green)
- Number of councillors: Three
- UK Parliament constituency: Croydon West

South Norwood is a ward in the London Borough of Croydon in the United Kingdom. It covers most of the district of South Norwood. The ward received major boundary changes following Croydon's boundary review. The first election held under the new boundaries was the 2018 Croydon Council election. The most recent election was the 2022 Croydon London Borough Council election, where 2 new councillors were elected.

== History ==
=== 2021 by-elections ===
On 6 May 2021, 5 by-elections were held in Croydon following the resignation of 5 councillors across New Addington North, South Norwood, Kenley, Park Hill and Whitgift and Woodside.

=== Regina Road ===
On 22 March 2021, ITV News released an article documenting the poor conditions of Regina Road flats showing images of the "appalling and dangerous conditions" caused by a water leak that had been present since at least 2017. An independent investigation was put forward to resolve the problems.

== List of Councillors ==
| Election | Councillor | Party | Councillor | Party | Councillor | Party |
|---|---|---|---|---|---|---|
| 1965 | Ward created | | | | | |
| 1965 | Paul Saunders | Conservative Resident | Mrs Beryl Saunders | Conservative Resident | CE Kelly | Conservative Resident |
| 1968 | Paul Saunders | Conservative | Mrs Beryl Saunders | Conservative | CE Kelly | Conservative |
| 1974 | Paul Saunders | Conservative | Mrs Beryl Saunders | Conservative | Miss IS Rodda | Conservative |
| 1978 | Paul Saunders | Conservative | Mrs Beryl Saunders | Conservative | Eileen Longhorn | Conservative |
| 1986 | Paul Saunders | Conservative | Mrs Beryl Saunders | Conservative | David Lipman | Conservative |
| 1990 | Eric J. Kings | Conservative | Mrs Beryl Saunders | Conservative | David Lipman | Conservative |
| 1994 | Clive Fraser | Labour | Jenny Bushell | Labour | Michael Jewitt | Labour |
| 1998 | Clive Fraser | Labour | Jane Avis | Labour | Michael Jewitt | Labour |
| 2002 | Andrew Bagnall | Labour | Jane Avis | Labour | Michael Jewitt | Labour |
| 2006 | Susan Bennett | Conservative | Jane Avis | Labour | Luke Clancy | Conservative |
| 2010 | Kathy Bee | Labour | Jane Avis | Labour | Wayne Lawlor | Labour |
| 2017 | Patsy Cummings | Labour | Jane Avis | Labour | Wayne Lawlor | Labour |
| 2018 | Patsy Cummings | Labour | Jane Avis | Labour | Clive Fraser | Labour |
| 2021 | Patsy Cummings | Labour | Louis Carserides | Labour | Clive Fraser | Labour |
| 2022 | Stella Nabukeera | Labour | Louis Carserides | Labour | Christopher Herman | Labour |
| 2026 | Tracey Hague | Green | Melanie Felten | Labour | Martyn Post | Green |

== Mayoral election results ==
Below are the results for the candidate which received the highest share of the popular vote in the ward at each mayoral election.

| Year | Mayoral candidate | Party | Winner? |
|---|---|---|---|
| 2022 | Val Shawcross | Labour | ✗ |

== Ward Results ==
Croydon Council Election 2026: South Norwood (3)
| Party | Candidate | Votes | % | ±% |
|---|---|---|---|---|
| Green | Tracey Hague | 1,546 | 37.4 | |
| Labour | Melanie Felten | 1,426 | 34.5 | |
| Green | Martyn Post | 1,386 | 33.5 | ▲22.3 |
| Green | Ruban Segaran | 1,331 | 32.2 | |
| Labour | Christopher Herman* | 1,304 | 31.5 | ▼10.6 |
| Labour | Stella Nabukeera* | 1,240 | 30.0 | ▼15.4 |
| Conservative | Jude Ayim-Awusu | 436 | 10.5 | |
| Conservative | Alan Clarke | 415 | 10.0 | |
| Reform | Michael Ryan | 400 | 9.7 | |
| Taking the Initiative | Michael Pusey | 388 | 9.4 | |
| Reform | Jamal Frederick | 378 | 9.1 | |
| Reform | Zachary Stiling | 357 | 8.6 | |
| Conservative | Charles Tye | 337 | 8.1 | |
| Liberal Democrats | Chris Stock | 300 | 7.3 | |
| Taking the Initiative | Valencia Dawson | 211 | 5.1 | |
| Taking the Initiative | Jason Brown | 208 | 5.0 | |
| TUSC | Benjamin Goldstone | 85 | 2.1 | |
| Turnout | | 4,136 | 36.74 | ▲6.35 |
| Green gain from Labour | | Swing | | |
| Labour hold | | Swing | | |
| Green gain from Labour | | Swing | | |

Croydon Council Election 2022: South Norwood (3)
| Party | Candidate | Votes | % | ±% |
|---|---|---|---|---|
| Labour | Louis Carserides* | 1,705 | | |
| Labour | Stella Nabukeera | 1,467 | | |
| Labour | Christopher Herman | 1,361 | | |
| Conservative | Matt O'Flynn | 536 | | |
| Taking the Initiative | Angela Kaler | 533 | | |
| Green | Timothy Coombe | 499 | | |
| Green | Marley King | 470 | | |
| Taking the Initiative | Spencer Fearon | 464 | | |
| Conservative | Sunny Tanna | 462 | | |
| Liberal Democrats | Luke Bonham | 431 | | |
| Conservative | Meenal Sambre | 429 | | |
| Taking the Initiative | Samia Solomon | 409 | | |
| Green | Martyn Post | 361 | | |
| Liberal Democrats | Susan Watson | 324 | | |
| Liberal Democrats | Douglas Tremellen | 239 | | |
| Turnout | | 3,507 | 30.39 | |
| Labour hold | | Swing | | |
| Labour hold | | Swing | | |
| Labour hold | | Swing | | |

South Norwood ward by-election, 6 May 2021
| Party | Candidate | Votes | % | ±% |
|---|---|---|---|---|
| Labour | Louis Carserides | 2,276 | 49.9 | ▼18.9 |
| Conservative | Sonia Marinello | 1,173 | 25.7 | ▲8.9 |
| Green | Ria Patel | 423 | 9.3 | ▲1.0 |
| Liberal Democrats | Luke Bonham | 288 | 6.3 | ▲0.1 |
| Taking the Initiative | Angela Kaler | 251 | | N/A |
| Independent | Jane Nicholl | 154 | | N/A |
| Majority | | 1,103 | 24.2 | |
| Turnout | | 4,565 | 40.2 | |
| Labour hold | | Swing | ▼27.7 | |

Croydon Council Election 2018: South Norwood (3)
| Party | Candidate | Votes | % | ±% |
|---|---|---|---|---|
| Labour | Jane Avis | 2,363 | 23.29 | |
| Labour | Clive Boyd Fraser | 2,356 | 23.22 | |
| Labour | Patsy Janet Cummings | 2,338 | 23.05 | |
| Conservative | Matthew Edward O'Flynn | 593 | 5.85 | |
| Conservative | Tirena Hillary Gunter | 575 | 5.67 | |
| Conservative | Chidi Umez | 559 | 4.29 | |
| Green | Tariq Salim | 305 | 3.01 | |
| Green | Hania Sophie Wisskirchen | 287 | 2.83 | |
| Liberal Democrats | Alexandra Elizabeth Mary Kellert | 262 | 2.58 | |
| Green | Marcus d'Arcy Conall Boyle | 256 | 2.52 | |
| Liberal Democrats | Aoife Noone | 189 | 1.86 | |
| Liberal Democrats | James Alan Ross Clark | 186 | 1.83 | |
| Majority | | 1,745 | 17.20 | |
| Turnout | | | | |
| Labour hold | | Swing | | |
| Labour hold | | Swing | | |
| Labour hold | | Swing | | |

South Norwood by-election, 7 September 2017
| Party | Candidate | Votes | % | ±% |
|---|---|---|---|---|
| Labour | Patsy Cummings | 1,671 | | |
| Conservative | Becca Natrajan | 475 | | |
| Liberal Democrats | Claire Bonham | 388 | | |
| Green | Peter Underwood | 218 | | |
| UKIP | Michael Swadling | 78 | | |
| Majority | | | | |
| Turnout | | | | |
| Labour hold | | Swing | | |

Croydon Council Election 2014: South Norwood (3)
| Party | Candidate | Votes | % | ±% |
|---|---|---|---|---|
| Labour | Katharine Bee | 2,303 | | |
| Labour | Jane Avis | 2,211 | | |
| Labour | Wayne Lawlor | 1,971 | | |
| Conservative | Jonathan Cope | 1,009 | | |
| Conservative | Matthew O'Flynn | 739 | | |
| Conservative | Rosina Mat St. James | 731 | | |
| Green | Graham Jones | 494 | | |
| Green | Andrew Ellis | 486 | | |
| UKIP | Winston McKenzie | 480 | | |
| UKIP | Anette Reid | 437 | | |
| UKIP | Barry Slayford | 437 | | |
| Green | James Seyforth | 359 | | |
| Liberal Democrats | Robert Brown | 314 | | |
| Liberal Democrats | Kimberley Reid | 220 | | |
| Liberal Democrats | Jonathan Regan | 177 | | |
| Majority | | | | |
| Turnout | | | | |
| Labour hold | | Swing | | |
| Labour hold | | Swing | | |
| Labour hold | | Swing | | |

Croydon Council Election 2010: South Norwood (3)
| Party | Candidate | Votes | % | ±% |
|---|---|---|---|---|
| Labour | Katharine Bee | 3,365 | 48.7 | |
| Labour | Jane Avis | 3,338 | 48.3 | |
| Labour | Wayne Lawlor | 2,942 | 42.5 | |
| Conservative | Susan Bennett | 1,928 | 27.9 | |
| Conservative | Richard Hough | 1,603 | 23.2 | |
| Conservative | Luke Clancy | 1,585 | 22.9 | |
| Liberal Democrats | David Boyle | 1,282 | 18.5 | |
| Liberal Democrats | Joanna Corbin | 1,232 | 17.8 | |
| Green | Suzanne Ackon | 791 | 11.4 | |
| Green | Jane Hutley | 400 | 5.8 | |
| Green | Ivonne Fernandes-Bonnar | 371 | 5.4 | |
| UKIP | Jonathan Serter | 295 | 4.3 | |
| Turnout | | 6,916 | 62.7% | |
| Labour gain from Conservative | | Swing | | |
| Labour gain from Conservative | | Swing | | |
| Labour hold | | Swing | | |

Croydon Council Election 2006: South Norwood (3)
| Party | Candidate | Votes | % | ±% |
|---|---|---|---|---|
| Conservative | Susan Bennett | 1,670 | | |
| Conservative | Luke Clancy | 1,523 | | |
| Labour | Jane Avis | 1,492 | | |
| Labour | Kathy Bee | 1.393 | | |
| Labour | Andy Bagnall | 1,385 | | |
| Conservative | Mohammed Quadir | 1,271 | | |
| Green | Tim Fernandes-Bonnar | 717 | | |
| Liberal Democrats | Julie Hardy-McBride | 684 | | |
| Liberal Democrats | Jan Perry | 616 | | |
| UKIP | Brian Hutchings | 233 | | |
| Turnout | | 3,997 | 37.2% | |
| Registered electors | | 10,732 | | |
| Conservative gain from Labour | | Swing | | |
| Conservative gain from Labour | | Swing | | |
| Labour hold | | Swing | | |

Croydon Council Election 2002: South Norwood (3)
| Party | Candidate | Votes | % | ±% |
|---|---|---|---|---|
| Labour | Jane Avis | 1,574 | | |
| Labour | Michael Jewitt | 1,471 | | |
| Labour | Andrew S.K. Bagnall | 1,392 | | |
| Conservative | Pauline Miles | 1,011 | | |
| Conservative | Helena M. Kowalska | 991 | | |
| Conservative | John L. Tooze | 787 | | |
| Liberal Democrats | Julie Hardy-McBride | 469 | | |
| Liberal Democrats | Graham Axford | 450 | | |
| Liberal Democrats | Jan Perry | 442 | | |
| Green | Brian Fewster | 278 | | |
| UKIP | Ronald L.J. Newman | 127 | | |
| UKIP | Alan G. Smith | 104 | | |
| UKIP | Claire J. Smith | 95 | | |
| Majority | | | | |
| Turnout | | | | |
| Labour hold | | Swing | | |
| Labour hold | | Swing | | |
| Labour hold | | Swing | | |

Croydon Council Election 1998: South Norwood (3)
| Party | Candidate | Votes | % | ±% |
|---|---|---|---|---|
| Labour | Jane Avis | 1,587 | | |
| Labour | Clive B. Fraser | 1,519 | | |
| Labour | Michael Jewitt | 1,484 | | |
| Conservative | George A. Filbey | 1,078 | | |
| Conservative | Pauline Miles | 1,054 | | |
| Conservative | John L. Tooze | 957 | | |
| Liberal Democrats | Julie Hardy-McBride | 357 | | |
| Liberal Democrats | Jan Perry | 336 | | |
| Majority | | | | |
| Turnout | | | | |
| Registered electors | | | | |
| Labour hold | | Swing | | |
| Labour hold | | Swing | | |
| Labour hold | | Swing | | |

Croydon Council Election 1994: South Norwood (3)
| Party | Candidate | Votes | % | ±% |
|---|---|---|---|---|
| Labour | Clive B. Fraser | 1,991 | | |
| Labour | Jenny Bushell | 1,935 | | |
| Labour | Michael Jewitt | 1,927 | | |
| Conservative | David Lipman | 1,563 | | |
| Conservative | Eric J. Kings | 1,456 | | |
| Conservative | Pauline Miles | 1,408 | | |
| Liberal Democrats | Philip J. Brown | 467 | | |
| Liberal Democrats | Jan Perry | 446 | | |
| Liberal Democrats | Julie Hardy-McBride | 443 | | |
| Majority | | 364 | | |
| Turnout | | | | |
| Registered electors | | | | |
| Labour gain from Conservative | | Swing | | |
| Labour gain from Conservative | | Swing | | |
| Labour gain from Conservative | | Swing | | |

Croydon Council Election 1990: South Norwood (3)
| Party | Candidate | Votes | % | ±% |
|---|---|---|---|---|
| Conservative | David Lipman | 1,747 | | |
| Conservative | Eric J. Kings | 1,681 | | |
| Conservative | Beryl Saunders | 1,639 | | |
| Labour | Michael Jewitt | 1,613 | | |
| Labour | Ben Earnshaw-Mansell | 1,612 | | |
| Labour | Clive B. Fraser | 1,560 | | |
| Liberal Democrats | Jonathan R. Cope | 474 | | |
| Liberal Democrats | James E. Borkoles | 430 | | |
| Liberal Democrats | Christopher M. Pocock | 413 | | |
| Green | Christine C. M. Roberts | 373 | | |
| Majority | | 26 | | |
| Turnout | | | | |
| Registered electors | | | | |
| Conservative hold | | Swing | | |
| Conservative hold | | Swing | | |
| Conservative hold | | Swing | | |

Croydon Council Election 1986: South Norwood (3)
| Party | Candidate | Votes | % | ±% |
|---|---|---|---|---|
| Conservative | Beryl Saunders | 1,407 | | |
| Conservative | David Lipman | 1,400 | | |
| Conservative | Paul A. Saunders | 1,379 | | |
| Liberal | Jeremy E. Cope | 1,189 | | |
| Liberal | Pamela M. Whirrity | 1,169 | | |
| Liberal | Anthony R. Phillips | 1,148 | | |
| Labour | Iain K. Forbes | 972 | | |
| Labour | Elaine A. Gibbon | 939 | | |
| Labour | Margaret H. Hardley | 907 | | |
| Majority | | 190 | | |
| Turnout | | | | |
| Registered electors | | | | |
| Conservative hold | | Swing | | |
| Conservative hold | | Swing | | |
| Conservative hold | | Swing | | |

Croydon Council Election 1982: South Norwood (3)
| Party | Candidate | Votes | % | ±% |
|---|---|---|---|---|
| Conservative | Beryl Saunders | 1,785 | | |
| Conservative | Paul A. Saunders | 1,752 | | |
| Conservative | Eileen J. Longhorn | 1,745 | | |
| Liberal | Ian S. Manders | 965 | | |
| Liberal | Jeremy E. Cope | 927 | | |
| Liberal | Leslie A. Rowe | 927 | | |
| Labour | Leni Gillman | 600 | | |
| Labour | Jonathan Pickering | 588 | | |
| Labour | Peter Luxton | 585 | | |
| Majority | | 780 | | |
| Turnout | | | | |
| Registered electors | | | | |
| Conservative hold | | Swing | | |
| Conservative hold | | Swing | | |
| Conservative hold | | Swing | | |

Croydon Council Election 1978: South Norwood (3)
| Party | Candidate | Votes | % | ±% |
|---|---|---|---|---|
| Conservative | Beryl Saunders | 1,899 | | |
| Conservative | Paul A. Saunders | 1,889 | | |
| Conservative | Eileen J. Longhorn | 1,838 | | |
| Labour | Patrick Byrne | 1,038 | | |
| Labour | Valerie L. Simanowitz | 998 | | |
| Labour | Alun W. Jones | 978 | | |
| Liberal | John R. Holoway | 242 | | |
| Liberal | Yvonne L. Cattermole | 205 | | |
| Liberal | Alan Taylor | 193 | | |
| Majority | | 800 | | |
| Turnout | | | | |
| Registered electors | | | | |
| Conservative hold | | Swing | | |
| Conservative hold | | Swing | | |
| Conservative hold | | Swing | | |

Croydon Council Election 1974: South Norwood (3)
| Party | Candidate | Votes | % | ±% |
|---|---|---|---|---|
| Conservative | Mrs B. Saunders | 2,197 | | |
| Conservative | P. A. Saunders | 2,180 | | |
| Conservative | Miss I. S. Rodda | 2,067 | | |
| Labour | Mrs A. M. Simpson | 1,742 | | |
| Labour | G. Andrews | 1,716 | | |
| Labour | B. E. A. Evans | 1,701 | | |
| Liberal | T. J. Barker | 475 | | |
| Liberal | D. F. Whyte | 431 | | |
| Liberal | J. H. Hamilton | 419 | | |
| Majority | | 325 | | |
| Turnout | | | 35.5 | ▲4.6% |
| Registered electors | | 12,849 | | |
| Conservative hold | | Swing | | |
| Conservative hold | | Swing | | |
| Conservative hold | | Swing | | |

Croydon Council Election 1971: South Norwood (3)
| Party | Candidate | Votes | % | ±% |
|---|---|---|---|---|
| Conservative | C. E. Kelly | 2,159 | | |
| Conservative | Mrs B. Saunders | 2,088 | | |
| Conservative | P. A. Saunders | 2,050 | | |
| Labour | Mrs W. M. Holt | 1,740 | | |
| Labour | A. D. Goddard | 1,715 | | |
| Labour | K. J. Kinnard | 1,708 | | |
| Turnout | | | 30.9 | ▼1.4% |
| Registered electors | | 12,939 | | |
| Conservative hold | | Swing | | |
| Conservative hold | | Swing | | |
| Conservative hold | | Swing | | |

Croydon Council Election 1968: South Norwood (3)
| Party | Candidate | Votes | % | ±% |
|---|---|---|---|---|
| Conservative | P.A. Saunders | 2,800 | | |
| Conservative | Mrs B. Saunders | 2,789 | | |
| Conservative | C.E. Kelly | 2,684 | | |
| Labour | K.P. Whelan | 667 | | |
| Labour | M. McGovern | 649 | | |
| Labour | E.F. Neckles | 611 | | |
| Liberal | M.E. Pache | 296 | | |
| Liberal | Mrs I.J. Muir | 293 | | |
| Liberal | Miss A.K. Harding | 283 | | |
| Turnout | | | 32.3 | ▼4.4% |
| Registered electors | | 11,871 | | |
| Conservative gain from Conservative Resident | | Swing | | |
| Conservative gain from Conservative Resident | | Swing | | |
| Conservative gain from Conservative Resident | | Swing | | |

Croydon Council Election 1964: South Norwood (3)
| Party | Candidate | Votes | % | ±% |
|---|---|---|---|---|
| Conservative Resident | P. A. Saunders | 2,119 | | |
| Conservative Resident | Mrs. B. Saunders | 2,089 | | |
| Conservative Resident | C. E. Kelly | 2,056 | | |
| Labour | P. Byrne | 1,682 | | |
| Labour | Mrs. M. Johnson | 1,519 | | |
| Labour | M. McGovern | 1,442 | | |
| Liberal | J. Mackenzie | 555 | | |
| Liberal | P. St. Clare Collis | 548 | | |
| Liberal | Mrs. P. Weal | 468 | | |
| Turnout | | 4,305 | 36.7 | |
| Registered electors | | 11,732 | | |
| Conservative Resident win (new seat) | | | | |
| Conservative Resident win (new seat) | | | | |
| Conservative Resident win (new seat) | | | | |
