= Norbury Park (ward) =

Electoral ward in the London borough of Croydon

- ward for Croydon Council
- Boundary of Norbury Park in Croydon from 2018.
- County: Greater London

Current ward
- Created: 2018
- Councillor: Alisa Flemming (Labour)
- Councillor: Appu Srinivasan (Labour)
- Number of councillors: Two
- Created from: Norbury and Upper Norwood
- UK Parliament constituency: Streatham and Croydon North

Norbury Park is a ward in the London Borough of Croydon. It was created from parts of the former Norbury and Upper Norwood wards. The ward's first election is 3 May 2018.

== List of Councillors ==
Election	Councillor	Party	Councillor	Party
2018	Ward created			
2018	Sherwan Chowdhury	Labour	Alisa Flemming	Labour
2022	Appu Srinivasan	Labour	Alisa Flemming	Labour
2026	Appu Srinivasan	Labour	Julie Setchfield	Labour

== Mayoral election results ==
Below are the results for the candidate which received the highest share of the popular vote in the ward at each mayoral election.

Year	Mayoral Election	Mayoral candidate	Party	Winner?
2021	Mayor of London	Sadiq Khan	Labour	✓
2022	Mayor of Croydon	Val Shawcross	Labour	✗
2026	Mayor of Croydon	Rowenna Davis	Labour	✗

== Ward Results ==
Croydon Council Election 2022: Norbury Park (2 seats)
Party	Candidate	Votes	%	±%
Labour Co-op	Alisa Flemming*	1,174		
Labour Co-op	Appu Srinivasan	1,164		
Conservative	Blake O'Donnell	776		
Conservative	Kofi Frimpong	709		
Green	Kirsty Bluck	315		
Liberal Democrats	Daniel O'Donovan	256		
Green	Mick Sullivan	197		
Liberal Democrats	James Woodman	189		
Taking the Initiative	Alan Collins	86		
Taking the Initiative	Claudine Lewis	76		
Turnout		2,765	35.33%	
Registered electors		7,826		
Labour hold		Swing		
Labour hold		Swing		

Croydon Council Election 2018: Norbury Park (2 seats)
Party	Candidate	Votes	%	±%
Labour	Sherwan Hussain Chowdhury	1,730	28.04	
Labour	Alisa Flemming	1,697	27.50	
Conservative	Blake O'Donnell	1,039	16.84	
Conservative	Olaluwa Kolade	976	15.82	
Green	Rebecca Louise Weighell	249	4.04	
Green	Graham Ronald Geoffrey Jones	199	3.23	
Liberal Democrats	Anne Dorothy Viney	159	2.58	
Liberal Democrats	Stephen John Viney	121	1.96	
Majority		658	10.66	
Turnout				
Labour hold		Swing		
Labour hold		Swing		
