= 2022 Croydon London Borough Council election =

2022 local election in Croydon

2022 Croydon local elections
- 5 May 2022
- Mayoral election
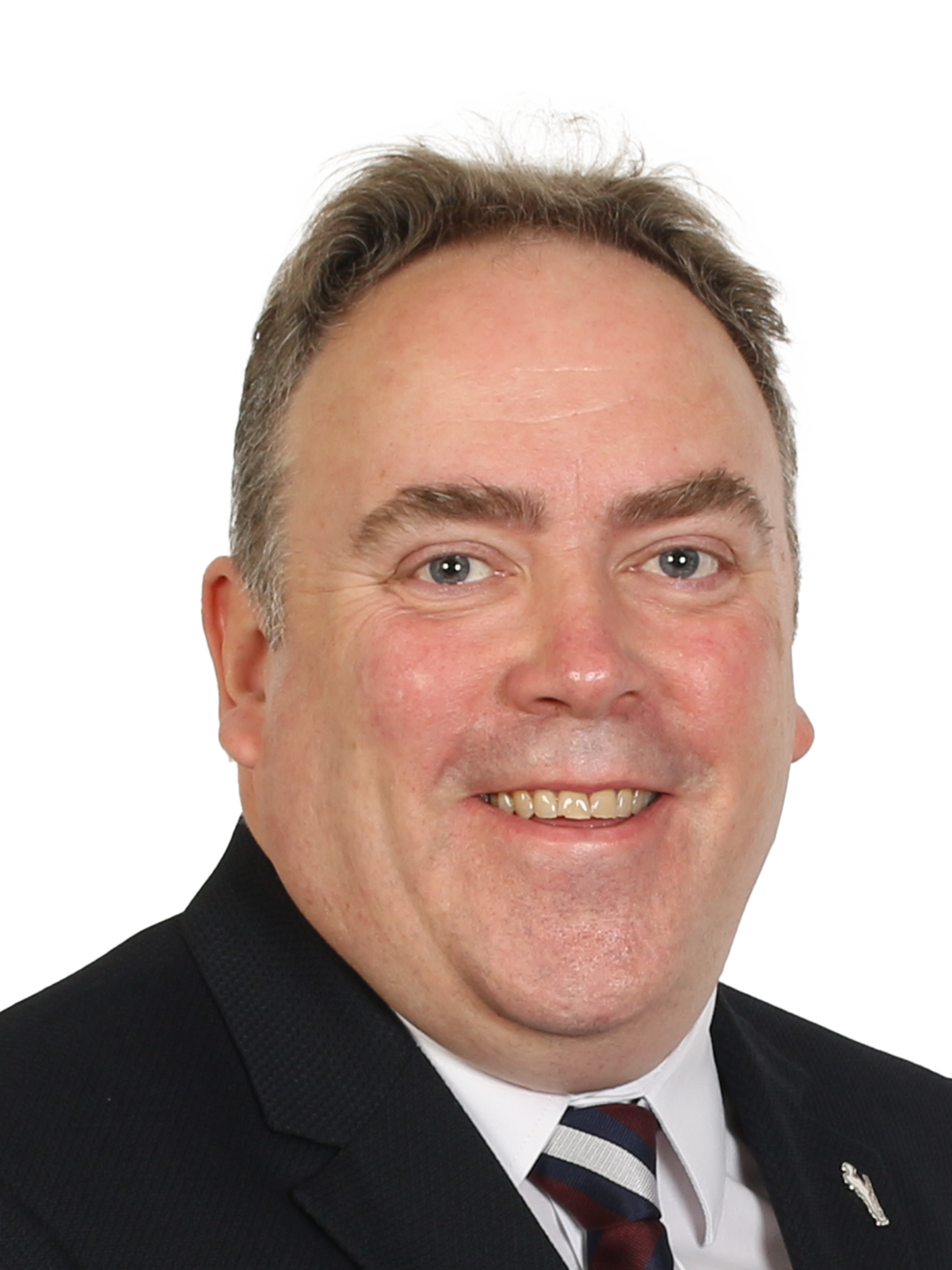

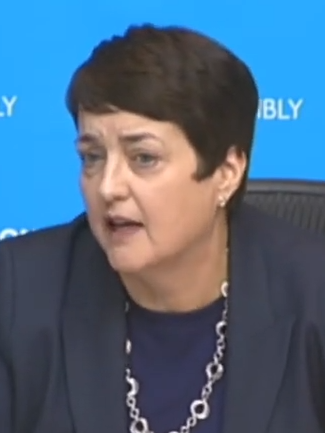

Candidate	Jason Perry	Val Shawcross	Richard Howard
Party	Conservative	Labour	Liberal Democrats
First round	33,413; 34.8%	31,352; 32.7%	9,967; 10.4%
Second round	38,612; 50.4%	38,023; 49.6%	Eliminated
Leader of the Council before election
Hamida Ali
Labour
Elected Mayor of Croydon
Jason Perry
Conservative
- Council election
- All 70 seats of Croydon London Borough Council (Note: The Mayor of Croydon also sits on the council); 36 seats needed for a majority
Party	Vote %	Seats	+/–
Conservative	38.5%	34	+5
Labour	34.5%	34	−7
Green	12.9%	2	+2
Liberal Democrats	11.7%	1	+1
This lists parties that won seats. See the complete results below.

In the 2022 Croydon London Borough Council election, on 5 May 2022, all 70 members of Croydon London Borough Council, and the Mayor of Croydon, were up for election. The elections took place alongside the local elections in the other London boroughs and elections to local authorities across the United Kingdom. Jason Perry of the Conservative Party narrowly won the mayoral election.

In the previous election in 2018, the Labour Party had maintained its control of the council, winning 41 out of the 70 seats with the Conservative Party forming the council opposition with the remaining 29 seats.

== Background ==
=== History ===
Result of the 2018 borough election

The thirty-two London boroughs were established in 1965 by the London Government Act 1963. They are the principal authorities in Greater London and have responsibilities including education, housing, planning, highways, social services, libraries, recreation, waste, environmental health and revenue collection. Some of the powers are shared with the Greater London Authority, which also manages passenger transport, police and fire.

Since its formation, until 2022, Croydon had variously been under Labour control, no overall control and Conservative control. Councillors have usually been elected only from the Labour and Conservative parties, with the most recent exceptions being the election of a single Liberal Democrat councillor in the 1998 and 2002 elections. The council had had an overall Labour majority since the 2014 election, in which Labour won forty seats while the Conservatives won thirty. Croydon Council has had 70 seats since the 1978 Council election, with 36 seats required for a majority. New election boundaries were put in place for the previous council election in 2018, which saw Labour maintain its majority with 41 seats with 44.5% of the vote to the Conservative Party's 29 seats with 40.1% of the vote. The Green Party received 7.7% of the vote and the Liberal Democrats received 5.8% of the vote across the borough, though neither won any seats. The incumbent leader of the council in 2022 was the Labour councillor Hamida Ali, who had held that position since 2020.

=== Council term ===
In January 2019, a Labour councillor for Norbury and Pollards Hill, Maggie Mansell, died. She had served on the council for twenty-five years. A by-election was held in March 2019 to replace her, which was won by the Labour candidate Leila Ben-Hassell. Ben-Hassell was a local party official who was working as a project manager for the City of London Corporation. A Labour councillor for Fairfield, Niroshan Sirisena, resigned in September 2019. Siresena was under police investigation following a "serious incident". The subsequent by-election on 7 November 2019 was won by the Labour candidate Caragh Skipper on a reduced majority, while the Liberal Democrats more than doubled their share of the vote.

In October 2020, after it became clear that the council was facing financial difficulty, the council leader Tony Newman resigned. The Labour councillor Hamida Ali was chosen by the council's Labour group to replace him. Ali established a new cabinet without Newman, Newman's finance lead Simon Hall who had also resigned, and the sitting cabinet members Stuart Collins, Alison Butler and Paul Scott. In November 2020, Croydon council announced its "de facto bankruptcy" by issuing two section 114 notices. In February 2021, Newman and Hall were suspended from the Labour party after a report was produced into their conduct in the lead-up to the effective bankruptcy of the council. In March, they both resigned from the council. A Labour councillor for South Norwood, Jane Avis, resigned for personal reasons in March 2021. A Conservative councillor for Kenley, Steve O'Connell, resigned in March 2021 ahead of the 2021 London Assembly election in which he was also standing down as an Assembly Member. A Conservative councillor for Park Hill & Whitgift, Vidhi Mohan, resigned at the same time "due to increasing demands in [his] professional life".

By-elections to replace all five councillors who had resigned were held on 6 May 2021 alongside the 2021 London mayoral election and London Assembly election. Each of the by-elections was won by its ward's incumbent party. Newman's ward, Woodside, elected the Labour candidate Michael Bonello. Simon Hall's ward, New Addington North, elected the Labour candidate Kola Agboola. South Norwood was won by the Labour candidate Louis Carserides. Kenley was won by the Conservative candidate Ola Kolade and Park Hill & Whitgift was won by the Conservative candidate Jade Appleton.

In February 2021, the Labour councillor and former Conservative MP Andrew Pelling called for Ali to resign unless she could "prove that she asked... questions when she was in Newman's cabinet" about a £37.5 million overspend during the refurbishment of Fairfield Halls. Pelling was expelled from the Labour Party after he registered a new political party called Putting Croydon First.

=== Mayoral referendum ===
A campaign group supporting an elected mayor for Croydon called DEMOC started a petition in February 2020, which they submitted to the council in September 2020. The mayoral system would replace the leader-and-cabinet system, whereby the leader of the council is chosen by the majority party or coalition of parties. In January 2021, the council announced that a referendum would be held in October of that year. The government minister Luke Hall said that the council should hold the referendum in May 2021 instead, alongside elections for the Mayor of London and London Assembly. The Labour councillor Sean Fitzsimons defended the choice to hold the referendum in October, saying that the prospective mayor could then be elected alongside the council in May 2022. The council also cited technical limitations about how it could spend money under the terms of the council's section 114 notice which required Hall to amend the law to facilitate the referendum.

The Conservatives, including the Conservative MP Chris Philp, campaigned in favour of an elected mayor. Labour opposed the mayoral system, including both Croydon Labour MPs. The Green Party also opposed the mayoral system, instead advocating a change to the committee system.

The referendum question was "How would you like the London Borough of Croydon to be run?", with the options being "By a leader who is an elected councillor chosen by a vote of the other elected councillors. This is how the council is run now." or "By a mayor who is elected by voters. This would be a change from how the council is run now." The result of the referendum was a large majority in favour of the mayoral system, with more than 80% of valid votes being cast in favour of the change.

Croydon mayoral referendum 7 October 2021
Choice	Votes	%
Elected mayor	47,165	80.37
Cabinet system	11,519	19.63
Total	58,684	100.00
Registered voters/turnout		21

== Campaign ==
Nick Bowes, the chief executive of the Centre for London, wrote that the election would come down to the Labour council mismanaging finances and the national Conservative government's "unpopularity in London", saying that Labour's mayoral candidate, Val Shawcross, would benefit from not being connected to the council's bankruptcy.

== Electoral process ==
Croydon, like other London borough councils, elects all of its councillors at once every four years. The previous election took place in 2018. The election took place by first-past-the-post voting in single-member constituencies, while in multi-member constituencies election took place by plurality block voting. Each ward is represented by one, two or three councillors. Electors had as many votes as there are councillors to be elected in their ward, and those with the most votes in each ward were to be elected.

In this election, only 1 seat was elected through FPTP which is Park Hill & Whitgift, while the remaining 69 seats were elected through plurality block voting.

All registered electors (British, Irish, Commonwealth and European Union citizens) living in London aged 18 or over were entitled to vote in the election. People who lived at two addresses in different councils, such as university students with different term-time and holiday addresses, were entitled to be registered for and vote in elections in both local authorities. Voting in-person at polling stations took place from 7:00 to 22:00 on election day, and voters were able to apply for postal votes or proxy votes in advance of the election.

== Previous council composition ==
Council composition after the 2018 election

Council composition ahead of the 2022 election

After 2018 election		Before 2022 election	
Party	Seats	Party	Seats
Labour	41	Labour	40
Conservative	29	Conservative	29
Independent	0	Independent	1

== Overall results ==
2022 Croydon London Borough Council election
Party	Seats	Gains	Losses	Net gain/loss	Seats %	Votes %	Votes	+/−
Conservative	34*	3	0	▲4	47.9	38.5	87,907	▼1.6
Labour	34	0	7	▼7	47.9	34.5	78,806	▼10.0
Green	2	2	0	▲2	2.8	12.9	29,390	▲5.2
Liberal Democrats	1	1	0	▲1	1.4	11.7	26,681	▲5.9
Taking the Initiative	0	0	0	Steady	0.0	1.8	4,121	N/A
Independent	0	0	0	Steady	0.0	0.6	1,297	±0.0
Animal Welfare	0	0	0	Steady	0.0	0.1	155	N/A
UKIP	0	0	0	Steady	0.0	0.1	117	▼0.7
Heritage	0	0	0	Steady	0.0	0.0	45	N/A

* The Conservative figure includes Jason Perry who was elected Mayor of Croydon. The Mayor of Croydon is a member of Full Council.

↓
33 plus Mayor	2	1	34
Conservative	Green	Lib Dem	Labour

== Results by ward ==
Statements of persons nominated were published on 10 April 2022. Incumbent councillors seeking re-election are marked with an asterisk (*). Councillors seeking re-election for a different ward are marked with a cross (†).

=== Addiscombe East ===
Addiscombe East (2)
Party	Candidate	Votes	%	±%
Conservative	Jeet Bains*	1,545	40.5	−2.4
Labour	Maddie Henson*	1,377	36.1	−10.4
Conservative	Kyle Knight	1,347	35.3	N/A
Labour	Tom Bowell	1,184	31.0	N/A
Liberal Democrats	Andrew Bennett	434	11.4	+6.3
Green	Bernice Golberg	425	11.1	+6.3
Liberal Democrats	Rachel Howard	400	10.5	N/A
Green	Nicholas Burman-Vince	308	8.1	N/A
Turnout		3,817	43.04	−4.73
Conservative hold		Swing		
Labour hold		Swing		

=== Addiscombe West ===
Addiscombe West (3)
Party	Candidate	Votes	%	±%
Labour Co-op	Sean Fitzsimons*	1,540	43.8	−10
Labour Co-op	Patricia Hay-Justice*	1,480	42.1	−7.9
Labour Co-op	Clive Fraser†	1,305	37.2	N/A
Conservative	Michael Norman	913	26.0	N/A
Conservative	Kosta Dexiades	816	23.2	N/A
Conservative	Fatima Zaman	771	22.0	N/A
Green	Kerry Akif	522	14.7	N/A
Green	Tracey Hague	465	13.2	+6.1
Liberal Democrats	Peter Ladanyi	416	11.8	+7.4
Green	Joseph Hague	397	11.3	+4.6
Liberal Democrats	Sasa Konecni	395	11.2	+5.8
Liberal Democrats	Andrew Thynne	331	9.4	N/A
Animal Welfare	Saffron Gloyne	155	4.4	N/A
Turnout		3,512	32.01	−6.56
Labour hold		Swing		
Labour hold		Swing		
Labour hold		Swing		

=== Bensham Manor ===
Bensham Manor (3)
Party	Candidate	Votes	%	±%
Labour Co-op	Humayan Kabir*	1,616	56.6	
Labour	Enid Mollyneaux	1,577	55.2	
Labour	Eunice O'Dame	1,530	53.6	
Conservative	Joyce Bright	599	21.0	
Independent	Graham Mitchell	548	19.2	
Conservative	John Newberry	519	18.2	
Conservative	Dev Parashar	458	16.0	
Green	Vinod Birdi	424	14.8	
Green	Clifford Fleming	372	13.0	
Green	Alex Raskovic	331	11.6	
Taking the Initiative	Renata Allman	257	9.0	
Taking the Initiative	Carl Collins	168	5.9	
Taking the Initiative	Jayson Miller	167	5.8	
Turnout		3,247	28.17	
Labour hold		Swing		
Labour hold		Swing		
Labour hold		Swing		

=== Broad Green ===
Broad Green (3)
Party	Candidate	Votes	%	±%
Labour	Stuart Collins*	1,885	62.2	
Labour	Sherwan Chowdhury†	1,764	58.2	
Labour	Manju Shahul-Hameed*	1,707	56.4	
Conservative	Jane Parker	775	25.6	
Conservative	Peter Anike	769	25.4	
Conservative	James Rajadurai	721	23.8	
Liberal Democrats	Adrian Waters	420	13.9	
Green	Winston Phillips	389	12.8	
Green	DJ Singh	331	10.9	
Green	Irene Theochari	325	10.7	
Turnout		3,534	26.52	
Labour hold		Swing		
Labour hold		Swing		
Labour hold		Swing		

=== Coulsdon Town ===
Coulsdon Town (3)
Party	Candidate	Votes	%	±%
Conservative	Ian Parker*	2,215	54.0	
Conservative	Mario Creatura*	2,141	52.2	
Conservative	Luke Shortland	2,013	49.1	
Liberal Democrats	Ashley Burridge	965	23.5	
Liberal Democrats	Andy Sparkes	890	21.7	
Labour	Stephen Black	861	21.0	
Labour	Yasmin Dubash	699	17.1	
Liberal Democrats	Frances Conn	690	16.8	
Labour	Femi Yusoof	657	16.0	
Green	Lucy Farndon	517	12.6	
Green	Clive Farndon	348	8.5	
Green	Jay Ginn	300	7.3	
Turnout		4,394	39.33	
Conservative hold		Swing		
Conservative hold		Swing		
Conservative hold		Swing		

=== Crystal Palace and Upper Norwood ===
Crystal Palace & Upper Norwood (3)
Party	Candidate	Votes	%	±%
Labour	Patsy Cummings†	1,753	40.1	
Labour	Nina de Grads	1,671	38.2	
Liberal Democrats	Claire Bonham	1,641	37.5	
Labour	Christine Spooner	1,531	35.0	
Liberal Democrats	Steven Penketh	1,259	28.8	
Liberal Democrats	Costel Petre	1,115	25.5	
Green	Rachel Chance	946	21.6	
Green	Tom Chance	698	16.0	
Green	Marcus Boyle	660	15.1	
Conservative	Don Charles-Lambert	633	14.5	
Conservative	Janet Wilkinson	616	14.1	
Conservative	Gemma Patient	605	13.8	
Turnout		4,665	37.92	
Labour hold		Swing		
Labour hold		Swing		
Liberal Democrats gain from Labour		Swing		

=== Fairfield ===
Fairfield (3)
Party	Candidate	Votes	%	±%
Green	Ria Patel	925	37.6	
Labour	Chris Clark*	923	37.5	
Green	Esther Sutton	913	37.1	
Green	Peter Underwood	890	36.2	
Labour	Jose Joseph	883	35.9	
Labour	Julie Setchfield	855	34.8	
Conservative	Danielle Denton	520	21.2	
Conservative	Matthew Dormer	486	19.8	
Conservative	Steve Jacobs	448	18.2	
Liberal Democrats	Michael Hunter	320	13.0	
Liberal Democrats	Syed Mohiuddin	212	8.6	
Turnout		2,672	24.45	
Green gain from Labour		Swing		
Labour hold		Swing		
Green gain from Labour		Swing		

=== Kenley ===
Kenley (2)
Party	Candidate	Votes	%	±%
Conservative	Gayle Gander	1,720	59.6	
Conservative	Ola Kolade*	1,712	59.3	
Liberal Democrats	Adrian Glendinning	517	17.9	
Liberal Democrats	Benjamin Horne	502	17.4	
Labour	Michael Anteney	376	13.0	
Green	Catherine Morris	346	12.0	
Labour	Shila Halai	340	11.8	
Green	Kristian Atkinson	262	9.1	
Turnout				
Conservative hold		Swing		
Conservative hold		Swing		

=== New Addington North ===
New Addington North (2)
Party	Candidate	Votes	%	±%
Labour	Kola Agboola*	832	52.1	
Conservative	Adele Benson	711	44.5	
Conservative	Michael Castle	679	42.5	
Labour	Sangeeta Gobidaas	653	40.9	
Green	Alison Gillett	172	10.8	
Green	Graham Jones	146	9.1	
Turnout		1,843	25.63	
Labour hold		Swing		
Conservative gain from Labour		Swing		

=== New Addington South ===
New Addington South (2)
Party	Candidate	Votes	%	±%
Conservative	Tony Pearson	953	51.1	
Conservative	Lara Fish	905	48.6	
Labour	Vicky Newton	840	45.1	
Labour	Ben Taylor	647	34.7	
Green	Nick Barnett	195	10.5	
Green	Hannah George	188	10.1	
Turnout		2,154	26.82	
Conservative gain from Labour		Swing		
Conservative gain from Labour		Swing		

=== Norbury and Pollards Hill ===
Norbury & Pollards Hill (2)
Party	Candidate	Votes	%	±%
Labour Co-op	Leila Ben-Hassel*	1,276	53.7	
Labour Co-op	Matthew Griffiths	1,152	48.5	
Conservative	Tirena Gunter	622	26.2	
Conservative	Mike Mogul	495	20.9	
Liberal Democrats	Christopher Adams	315	13.3	
Green	Cheryl Zimmerman	252	10.6	
Green	Larissa Amor	250	10.5	
Liberal Democrats	Mark Chalmers	188	7.9	
Taking the Initiative	Ghazala Akhtar	101	4.3	
Taking the Initiative	Laura Manser	97	4.1	
Turnout		2,706	30.96%	
Registered electors		8,740		
Labour Co-op hold		Swing		
Labour Co-op hold		Swing		

=== Norbury Park ===
Norbury Park (2)
Party	Candidate	Votes	%	±%
Labour Co-op	Alisa Flemming*	1,174	47.5	
Labour Co-op	Appu Srinivasan	1,164	47.1	
Conservative	Blake O'Donnell	776	31.4	−11
Conservative	Kofi Frimpong	709	28.7	
Green	Kirsty Bluck	315	12.7	
Liberal Democrats	Daniel O'Donovan	256	10.4	
Green	Mick Sullivan	197	8.0	
Liberal Democrats	James Woodman	189	7.6	
Taking the Initiative	Alan Collins	86	3.5	
Taking the Initiative	Claudine Lewis	76	3.1	
Turnout		2,765	35.33%	
Registered electors		7,826		
Labour hold		Swing		
Labour hold		Swing		

=== Old Coulsdon ===
Old Coulsdon (2)
Party	Candidate	Votes	%	±%
Conservative	Margaret Bird*	1,999	61.8	
Conservative	Nikhil Thampi	1,555	48.0	
Liberal Democrats	Gill Hickson	1,376	42.5	
Liberal Democrats	John Jefkins	932	28.8	
Green	Mick Kilkelly	209	6.5	
Labour	Jason O'Dwyer	208	6.4	
Labour	Mary Wolf	194	6.0	
Turnout		3,479	45.79	
Conservative hold		Swing		
Conservative hold		Swing		

=== Park Hill and Whitgift ===
Park Hill & Whitgift (1)
Party	Candidate	Votes	%	±%
Conservative	Jade Appleton*	969	53.7	
Labour	Joseph Erber	424	23.5	
Green	James Cork	191	10.6	
Liberal Democrats	Szymon Zaborski	167	9.3	
Taking the Initiative	Caleap Wagner	54	3.0	
Turnout				
Conservative hold		Swing		

=== Purley and Woodcote ===
Purley & Woodcote (3)
Party	Candidate	Votes	%	±%
Conservative	Simon Brew*	2,699	63.3	
Conservative	Holly Ramsey	2,666	62.5	
Conservative	Samir Dwesar	2,389	56.0	
Liberal Democrats	James Arneill	859	20.1	
Labour	Rebecca Chinn	698	16.4	
Labour	James Brady	688	16.1	
Green	Oli Green	628	14.7	
Liberal Democrats	Guy Burchett	609	14.3	
Labour	Mark Justice	596	14.0	
Green	Simon Hargrave	514	12.0	
Green	Anthony Mills	454	10.6	
Turnout		4,685	37.42	
Conservative hold		Swing		
Conservative hold		Swing		
Conservative hold		Swing		

=== Purley Oaks and Riddlesdown ===
Purley Oaks and Riddlesdown (2)
Party	Candidate	Votes	%	±%
Conservative	Alasdair Stewart	1,635	56.7	
Conservative	Endri Llabuti	1,438	49.8	
Liberal Democrats	Anne Howard	556	19.3	
Liberal Democrats	Chris Jordan	509	17.6	
Labour	Robert Barber	475	16.5	
Labour	Karthika Dhamodaran	443	15.4	
Green	James Harrison	389	13.5	
Green	Simon Desorgher	325	11.3	
Turnout		3,142	39.41	
Conservative hold		Swing		
Conservative hold		Swing		

=== Sanderstead ===
Sanderstead (3)
Party	Candidate	Votes	%	±%
Conservative	Yvette Hopley*	3,826	70.0	
Conservative	Lynne Hale*	3,806	69.6	
Conservative	Helen Redfern†	3,596	65.8	
Liberal Democrats	James Clark	718	13.1	
Liberal Democrats	Annie Jordan	705	12.9	
Labour	Laura Doughty	658	12.0	
Green	Helen Buckland	591	10.8	
Labour	Alan Malarkey	572	10.5	
Labour	Tim Rodgers	549	10.0	
Liberal Democrats	Edward Wells	510	9.3	
Green	Connie Muir	465	8.5	
Green	Oliver Duxbury	407	7.4	
Turnout			48.36	
Conservative hold		Swing		
Conservative hold		Swing		
Conservative hold		Swing		

=== Selhurst ===
Selhurst (2)
Party	Candidate	Votes	%	±%
Labour	Catherine Wilson	1,026	53.5	
Labour	Mohammad Islam	997	52.0	
Conservative	Ian Stuart	341	17.8	
Conservative	Shakera Bowen	333	17.4	
Green	Catherine Graham	291	15.2	
Green	Alexander Cox	254	13.2	
Liberal Democrats	Daniel Houghton	252	13.1	
Taking the Initiative	Amaya Emmanuel	178	9.3	
Taking the Initiative	Francesca Dill	164	8.6	
Turnout		2,200	26.08	
Labour hold		Swing		
Labour hold		Swing		

=== Selsdon and Addington Village ===
Selsdon & Addington Village (2)
Party	Candidate	Votes	%	±%
Conservative	Joseph Lee	1,771	58.7	
Conservative	Rob Ward*	1,695	56.2	
Labour	Angela Collins	649	21.5	
Liberal Democrats	Helen Lishmund	513	17.0	
Labour	Anthony Ellis	480	15.9	
Green	Bryony Bullock	360	11.9	
Green	Matt Bullock	263	8.7	
Liberal Democrats	Jean Semadeni	254	8.4	
Heritage	Zachary Stiling	45	1.5	
Turnout		3,327	41.69	
Conservative hold		Swing		
Conservative hold		Swing		

=== Selsdon Vale and Forestdale ===
Selsdon Vale & Forestdale (2)
Party	Candidate	Votes	%	±%
Conservative	Andy Stranack*	1,964	74.3	
Conservative	Badsha Quadir†	1,502	56.8	
Labour	Russell Whitehead	480	18.2	
Green	Adrian Douglas	469	17.7	
Labour	Anwar Hossain	446	16.9	
Green	Gary Kelly	425	16.1	
Turnout				
Conservative hold		Swing		
Conservative hold		Swing		

=== Shirley North ===
Shirley North (3)
Party	Candidate	Votes	%	±%
Conservative	Sue Bennett*	2,069	54.7	
Conservative	Richard Chatterjee*	1,911	50.5	
Conservative	Mark Johnson	1,810	47.9	
Labour	Mark Henson	1,165	30.8	
Labour	Nuala O'Neill	1,027	27.2	
Labour	Peter Spalding	931	24.6	
Liberal Democrats	Sarah Harrison	616	16.3	
Green	Caroline Osland	422	11.2	
Green	Joseph Elliott-Coleman	403	10.7	
Liberal Democrats	Lawrence Sereda	401	10.6	
Liberal Democrats	Kaashif Hymabaccus	315	8.3	
Green	Christopher Sciberras	274	7.2	
Turnout		4,152	35.38	
Conservative hold		Swing		
Conservative hold		Swing		
Conservative hold		Swing		

=== Shirley South ===
Shirley South (2)
Party	Candidate	Votes	%	±%
Conservative	Jason Cummings*	1,520	52.0	
Conservative	Scott Roche*	1,374	47.0	
Labour	Maggie Conway	806	27.6	
Labour	Safwan Chowdhury	682	23.3	
Green	Andy Bebington	480	16.4	
Green	Liz Bebington	445	15.2	
Liberal Democrats	Anna Ruse	296	10.1	
Liberal Democrats	Giacinto Palmieri	246	8.4	
Turnout		3,179	38.78	
Conservative hold		Swing		
Conservative hold		Swing		

=== South Croydon ===
South Croydon (3)
Party	Candidate	Votes	%	±%
Conservative	Maria Gatland*	1,898	43.3	
Conservative	Jason Perry*	1,872	42.7	
Conservative	Michael Neal*	1,688	38.5	
Labour	Bridget Galloway	1,378	31.4	
Labour	Joshua Andrew	1,359	31.0	
Labour	Tariq Hafeez	1,196	27.3	
Green	Steve Harris	682	15.5	
Liberal Democrats	Martin Drake	668	15.2	
Liberal Democrats	Michael Bishopp	659	15.0	
Green	Nayan Patel	605	13.8	
Liberal Democrats	Keith Miller	529	12.1	
Green	Marc Richards	508	11.6	
UKIP	Kathleen Garner	117	2.7	
Turnout		4,788	38.41	−1.67
Conservative hold		Swing		
Conservative hold		Swing		
Conservative hold		Swing		

=== South Norwood ===
South Norwood (3)
Party	Candidate	Votes	%	±%
Labour	Louis Carserides*	1,705	52.8	
Labour	Stella Nabukeera	1,467	45.4	
Labour	Christopher Herman	1,361	42.1	
Conservative	Matt O'Flynn	536	16.6	
Taking the Initiative	Angela Kaler	533	16.5	
Green	Timothy Coombe	499	15.4	
Green	Marley King	470	14.6	
Taking the Initiative	Spencer Fearon	464	14.4	
Conservative	Sunny Tanna	462	14.3	
Liberal Democrats	Luke Bonham	431	13.3	
Conservative	Meenal Sambre	429	13.3	
Taking the Initiative	Samia Solomon	409	12.7	
Green	Martyn Post	361	11.2	
Liberal Democrats	Susan Watson	324	10.0	
Liberal Democrats	Douglas Tremellen	239	7.4	
Turnout		3,507	30.39	−1.03
Labour hold		Swing		
Labour hold		Swing		
Labour hold		Swing		

=== Thornton Heath ===
Thornton Heath (3)
Party	Candidate	Votes	%	±%
Labour	Karen Jewitt*	2,021	59.1	
Labour	Tamar Nwafor	1,789	52.4	
Labour	Callton Young*	1,539	45.0	
Conservative	Richard Harris	681	19.9	9
Conservative	John Tipton	600	17.6	
Independent	Andrea Perry	592	17.3	
Conservative	Folarin Bamgbopa	553	16.2	
Green	Marian Hoffman	549	16.1	
Liberal Democrats	Andrew Barrett	546	16.0	
Green	Ian Bradler	496	14.5	
Green	Angus Hewlett	400	11.7	
Taking the Initiative	Jillette Marquis	183	5.4	
Taking the Initiative	Hanan Lamaallam	180	5.3	
Taking the Initiative	Jason McLean	122	3.6	
Turnout		3,758	30.24	
Labour hold		Swing		
Labour hold		Swing		
Labour hold		Swing		

=== Waddon ===
Waddon (3)
Party	Candidate	Votes	%	±%
Labour	Rowenna Davis	1,620	43.9	
Conservative	Simon Fox	1,406	38.1	
Labour	Ellily Ponnuthurai	1,397	37.9	
Labour	Jessica Rich	1,394	37.8	
Conservative	Donald Ekekhomen	1,238	33.5	
Conservative	Sharmmi Jeganmogan	1,174	31.8	
Independent	Andrew Pelling*	705	19.1	
Green	Simon Jones	497	13.5	
Green	Imogen Loucas	487	13.2	
Green	Mary Sibtain	414	11.2	
Liberal Democrats	Yusuf Osman	377	10.2	
Liberal Democrats	Josh Viggiani	363	9.8	
Turnout		4,069	31.68%	
Registered electors		12,845		
Labour hold		Swing		
Conservative gain from Labour		Swing		
Labour hold		Swing		

Andrew Pelling was previously elected as the Labour candidate.

=== West Thornton ===
West Thornton (3)
Party	Candidate	Votes	%	±%
Labour	Janet Campbell*	1,896	66.2	
Labour	Stuart King*	1,755	61.3	
Labour	Chrishni Reshekaron	1,684	58.8	
Conservative	Patrick Ratnaraja	818	28.6	
Conservative	Tom Lott	803	28.0	
Conservative	Abdul Talukdar	595	20.8	
Green	Barry Buttigieg	418	14.6	
Green	Rosalyn Mott	407	14.2	
Taking the Initiative	Ben Andoh	218	7.6	
Turnout		3,408	27.15	
Labour hold		Swing		
Labour hold		Swing		
Labour hold		Swing		

=== Woodside ===
Woodside (3)
Party	Candidate	Votes	%	±%
Labour	Mike Bonello*	2,098	55.5	
Labour	Amy Foster	1,938	51.3	
Labour	Brigitte Graham	1,763	46.6	
Conservative	Titilope Adeoye	741	19.6	
Conservative	Rebecca Natrajan	678	17.9	
Conservative	Des Wright	675	17.9	
Green	Pravina Ellis	548	14.5	
Green	Elaine Garrod	492	13.0	
Green	Frances Fearon	489	12.9	
Liberal Democrats	Jane Waterhouse	463	12.2	
Liberal Democrats	Tomas Howard-Jones	402	10.6	
Liberal Democrats	Andrew Rendle	391	10.3	
Taking the Initiative	Khataetthaleeya Gibbs	259	6.9	
Taking the Initiative	Mark Emmanuel	246	6.5	
Taking the Initiative	Seugul Metin	159	4.2	
Turnout		4,075	33.12	−1.72
Labour hold		Swing		
Labour hold		Swing		
Labour hold		Swing		

== Mayoral election ==
The Conservatives selected their council group leader Jason Perry to be their mayoral candidate in October 2021. Labour began their selection process in October 2021. The former deputy mayor of London Val Shawcross was selected as the Labour candidate in December 2021. The Green Party selected Peter Underwood as their candidate in November 2021. The businessperson Farah London, who stood as an independent candidate in the 2021 London mayoral election, was announced as the mayoral candidate for the Taking the Initiative Party.

2022 Croydon mayoral election
Party	Candidate	1st round		2nd round			1st round votesTransfer votes, 2nd round
Party	Candidate	Total	Of round	Transfers	Total	Of round	1st round votesTransfer votes, 2nd round
Conservative	Jason Perry	33,413	34.8%	5,199	38,612	50.4	
Labour Co-op	Val Shawcross	31,352	32.7%	6,671	38,023	49.6	
Liberal Democrats	Richard Howard	9,967	10.4%				
Independent	Andrew Pelling	6,807	7.1%				
Green	Peter Underwood	6,193	6.5%				
Taking the Initiative	Farah London	5,768	6.0%				
Independent	Winston McKenzie	1,324	1.4%				
Independent	Gavin Palmer	1,114	1.2%				
Total votes		97,458					
Registered electors		280,960					
Conservative win							

=== Mayoral results by ward ===
==== Addiscombe East ====
Addiscombe East
Party	Candidate	1st round		2nd round			1st round votesTransfer votes, 2nd round
Party	Candidate	Total	Of round	Transfers	Total	Of round	1st round votesTransfer votes, 2nd round
Labour Co-op	Val Shawcross	1,371	36.1%	260	1,631	52.3	
Conservative	Jason Perry	1,315	34.6%	171	1,486	47.7	
Liberal Democrats	Richard Howard	338	8.9%				
Independent	Andrew Pelling	297	7.8%				
Green	Peter Underwood	234	6.2%				
Taking the Initiative	Farah London	176	4.6%				
Independent	Winston McKenzie	33	0.9%				
Independent	Gavin Palmer	32	0.8%				
Total votes		3,840					
Registered electors		8,868					

==== Addiscombe West ====
Addiscombe West
Party	Candidate	1st round		2nd round			1st round votesTransfer votes, 2nd round
Party	Candidate	Total	Of round	Transfers	Total	Of round	1st round votesTransfer votes, 2nd round
Labour Co-op	Val Shawcross	1,444	41.6%	318	1,762	64.9	
Conservative	Jason Perry	786	22.6%	169	955	35.1	
Liberal Democrats	Richard Howard	322	9.3%				
Independent	Andrew Pelling	316	9.1%				
Green	Peter Underwood	290	8.3%				
Taking the Initiative	Farah London	219	6.3%				
Independent	Winston McKenzie	54	1.6%				
Independent	Gavin Palmer	44	1.3%				
Total votes		3,541					
Registered electors		10,971					

==== Bensham Manor ====
Bensham Manor
Party	Candidate	1st round		2nd round			1st round votesTransfer votes, 2nd round
Party	Candidate	Total	Of round	Transfers	Total	Of round	1st round votesTransfer votes, 2nd round
Labour Co-op	Val Shawcross	1,670	52.8%	271	1,941	76.1	
Conservative	Jason Perry	522	16.5%	88	610	23.9	
Taking the Initiative	Farah London	250	7.9%				
Liberal Democrats	Richard Howard	223	7.1%				
Green	Peter Underwood	187	5.9%				
Independent	Andrew Pelling	150	4.7%				
Independent	Winston McKenzie	117	3.7%				
Independent	Gavin Palmer	43	1.4%				
Total votes		3,262					
Registered electors		11,525					

==== Broad Green ====
Broad Green
Party	Candidate	1st round		2nd round			1st round votesTransfer votes, 2nd round
Party	Candidate	Total	Of round	Transfers	Total	Of round	1st round votesTransfer votes, 2nd round
Labour Co-op	Val Shawcross	1,847	53.6%	195	2,042	71.5	
Conservative	Jason Perry	722	21.0%	90	812	28.5	
Liberal Democrats	Richard Howard	254	7.4%				
Taking the Initiative	Farah London	242	7.0%				
Green	Peter Underwood	158	4.6%				
Independent	Andrew Pelling	133	3.9%				
Independent	Gavin Palmer	47	1.4%				
Independent	Winston McKenzie	41	1.2%				
Total votes		3,543					
Registered electors		13,327					

==== Coulsdon Town ====
Coulsdon Town
Party	Candidate	1st round		2nd round			1st round votesTransfer votes, 2nd round
Party	Candidate	Total	Of round	Transfers	Total	Of round	1st round votesTransfer votes, 2nd round
Conservative	Jason Perry	2,161	49.2%	282	2,443	70.2	
Labour Co-op	Val Shawcross	772	17.6%	264	1,036	29.8	
Liberal Democrats	Richard Howard	671	15.3%				
Independent	Andrew Pelling	286	6.5%				
Green	Peter Underwood	248	5.7%				
Taking the Initiative	Farah London	183	4.2%				
Independent	Gavin Palmer	35	0.8%				
Independent	Winston McKenzie	33	0.8%				
Total votes		4,422					
Registered electors		11,173					

==== Crystal Palace & Upper Norwood ====
Crystal Palace & Upper Norwood
Party	Candidate	1st round		2nd round			1st round votesTransfer votes, 2nd round
Party	Candidate	Total	Of round	Transfers	Total	Of round	1st round votesTransfer votes, 2nd round
Labour Co-op	Val Shawcross	1,904	41.3%	573	2,477	74.5	
Liberal Democrats	Richard Howard	1,065	23.1%				
Conservative	Jason Perry	636	13.8%	211	847	25.5	
Green	Peter Underwood	531	11.5%				
Taking the Initiative	Farah London	248	5.4%				
Independent	Andrew Pelling	133	2.9%				
Independent	Winston McKenzie	65	1.4%				
Independent	Gavin Palmer	27	0.6%				
Total votes		4,684					
Registered electors		12,303					

==== Fairfield ====
Fairfield
Party	Candidate	1st round		2nd round			1st round votesTransfer votes, 2nd round
Party	Candidate	Total	Of round	Transfers	Total	Of round	1st round votesTransfer votes, 2nd round
Labour Co-op	Val Shawcross	925	34.8%	355	1,280	67.5	
Green	Peter Underwood	665	25.0%				
Conservative	Jason Perry	456	17.1%	161	617	32.5	
Liberal Democrats	Richard Howard	204	7.7%				
Taking the Initiative	Farah London	201	7.6%				
Independent	Andrew Pelling	144	5.4%				
Independent	Winston McKenzie	37	1.4%				
Independent	Gavin Palmer	28	1.1%				
Total votes		2,699					
Registered electors		10,928					

==== Kenley ====
Kenley
Party	Candidate	1st round		2nd round			1st round votesTransfer votes, 2nd round
Party	Candidate	Total	Of round	Transfers	Total	Of round	1st round votesTransfer votes, 2nd round
Conservative	Jason Perry	1,749	55.8%	225	1,974	77.9	
Labour Co-op	Val Shawcross	417	13.3%	144	561	22.1	
Liberal Democrats	Richard Howard	360	11.5%				
Independent	Andrew Pelling	270	8.6%				
Green	Peter Underwood	167	5.3%				
Taking the Initiative	Farah London	120	3.8%				
Independent	Gavin Palmer	34	1.1%				
Independent	Winston McKenzie	20	0.6%				
Total votes		3,158					
Registered electors		7,948					

==== New Addington North ====
New Addington North
Party	Candidate	1st round		2nd round			1st round votesTransfer votes, 2nd round
Party	Candidate	Total	Of round	Transfers	Total	Of round	1st round votesTransfer votes, 2nd round
Labour Co-op	Val Shawcross	786	43.3%	86	872	56.1	
Conservative	Jason Perry	634	34.9%	49	683	43.9	
Independent	Andrew Pelling	99	5.4%				
Liberal Democrats	Richard Howard	89	4.9%				
Green	Peter Underwood	79	4.3%				
Taking the Initiative	Farah London	77	4.2%				
Independent	Winston McKenzie	36	2.0%				
Independent	Gavin Palmer	17	0.9%				
Total votes		1,862					
Registered electors		7,191					

==== New Addington South ====
New Addington South
Party	Candidate	1st round		2nd round			1st round votesTransfer votes, 2nd round
Party	Candidate	Total	Of round	Transfers	Total	Of round	1st round votesTransfer votes, 2nd round
Conservative	Jason Perry	862	40.4%	83	945	52.0	
Labour Co-op	Val Shawcross	803	37.6%	70	873	48.0	
Independent	Andrew Pelling	119	5.6%				
Liberal Democrats	Richard Howard	135	6.3%				
Green	Peter Underwood	79	3.7%				
Taking the Initiative	Farah London	73	3.4%				
Independent	Winston McKenzie	34	1.6%				
Independent	Gavin Palmer	30	1.4%				
Total votes		2,182					
Registered electors		8,031					

==== Norbury & Pollards Hill ====
Norbury & Pollards Hill
Party	Candidate	1st round		2nd round			1st round votesTransfer votes, 2nd round
Party	Candidate	Total	Of round	Transfers	Total	Of round	1st round votesTransfer votes, 2nd round
Labour Co-op	Val Shawcross	1,289	48.1%	212	1,501	68.7	
Conservative	Jason Perry	588	21.9%	97	685	31.3	
Liberal Democrats	Richard Howard	228	8.5%				
Taking the Initiative	Farah London	195	7.3%				
Green	Peter Underwood	163	6.1%				
Independent	Andrew Pelling	127	4.7%				
Independent	Winston McKenzie	53	2.0%				
Independent	Gavin Palmer	39	1.5%				
Total votes		2,725					
Registered electors		8,740					

==== Norbury Park ====
Norbury Park
Party	Candidate	1st round		2nd round			1st round votesTransfer votes, 2nd round
Party	Candidate	Total	Of round	Transfers	Total	Of round	1st round votesTransfer votes, 2nd round
Labour Co-op	Val Shawcross	1,282	47.0%	170	1,452	61.6	
Conservative	Jason Perry	811	29.7%	95	906	38.4	
Liberal Democrats	Richard Howard	221	8.1%				
Taking the Initiative	Farah London	157	5.8%				
Green	Peter Underwood	133	4.9%				
Independent	Andrew Pelling	72	2.6%				
Independent	Winston McKenzie	33	1.2%				
Independent	Gavin Palmer	18	0.7%				
Total votes		2,774					
Registered electors		7,826					

==== Old Coulsdon ====
Old Coulsdon
Party	Candidate	1st round		2nd round			1st round votesTransfer votes, 2nd round
Party	Candidate	Total	Of round	Transfers	Total	Of round	1st round votesTransfer votes, 2nd round
Conservative	Jason Perry	1,875	54.0%	275	2,150	82.6	
Liberal Democrats	Richard Howard	890	25.6%				
Labour Co-op	Val Shawcross	307	8.8%	145	452	17.4	
Independent	Andrew Pelling	145	4.2%				
Green	Peter Underwood	126	3.6%				
Taking the Initiative	Farah London	75	2.2%				
Independent	Winston McKenzie	29	0.8%				
Independent	Gavin Palmer	24	0.7%				
Total votes		3,501					
Registered electors		7,597					

==== Park Hill & Whitgift ====
Park Hill & Whitgift
Party	Candidate	1st round		2nd round			1st round votesTransfer votes, 2nd round
Party	Candidate	Total	Of round	Transfers	Total	Of round	1st round votesTransfer votes, 2nd round
Conservative	Jason Perry	601	32.9%	158	759	54.1	
Labour Co-op	Val Shawcross	532	29.1%	111	643	45.9	
Independent	Andrew Pelling	249	13.6%				
Liberal Democrats	Richard Howard	180	9.8%				
Green	Peter Underwood	121	6.6%				
Taking the Initiative	Farah London	118	6.5%				
Independent	Gavin Palmer	17	0.9%				
Independent	Winston McKenzie	11	0.6%				
Total votes		1,835					
Registered electors		4,307					

==== Purley & Woodcote ====
Purley & Woodcote
Party	Candidate	1st round		2nd round			1st round votesTransfer votes, 2nd round
Party	Candidate	Total	Of round	Transfers	Total	Of round	1st round votesTransfer votes, 2nd round
Conservative	Jason Perry	2,640	56.3%	277	2,917	75.6	
Labour Co-op	Val Shawcross	711	15.2%	233	944	24.4	
Liberal Democrats	Richard Howard	522	11.1%				
Independent	Andrew Pelling	291	6.2%				
Green	Peter Underwood	228	4.9%				
Taking the Initiative	Farah London	204	4.3%				
Independent	Gavin Palmer	67	1.4%				
Independent	Winston McKenzie	28	0.6%				
Total votes		4,733					
Registered electors		12,521					

==== Purley Oaks & Riddlesdown ====
Purley Oaks & Riddlesdown
Party	Candidate	1st round		2nd round			1st round votesTransfer votes, 2nd round
Party	Candidate	Total	Of round	Transfers	Total	Of round	1st round votesTransfer votes, 2nd round
Conservative	Jason Perry	1,532	48.7%	234	1,766	70.7	
Labour Co-op	Val Shawcross	541	17.2%	191	732	29.3	
Liberal Democrats	Richard Howard	357	11.3%				
Independent	Andrew Pelling	314	10.0%				
Green	Peter Underwood	199	6.3%				
Taking the Initiative	Farah London	149	4.7%				
Independent	Winston McKenzie	31	1.0%				
Independent	Gavin Palmer	26	0.8%				
Total votes		3,174					
Registered electors		7,972					

==== Sanderstead ====
Sanderstead
Party	Candidate	1st round		2nd round			1st round votesTransfer votes, 2nd round
Party	Candidate	Total	Of round	Transfers	Total	Of round	1st round votesTransfer votes, 2nd round
Conservative	Jason Perry	3,599	62.5%	363	3,962	81.7	
Labour Co-op	Val Shawcross	666	11.6%	222	888	18.3	
Liberal Democrats	Richard Howard	569	9.9%				
Independent	Andrew Pelling	413	7.2%				
Green	Peter Underwood	234	4.1%				
Taking the Initiative	Farah London	190	3.3%				
Independent	Gavin Palmer	46	0.8%				
Independent	Winston McKenzie	45	0.8%				
Total votes		5,812					
Registered electors		11,921					

==== Selhurst ====
Selhurst
Party	Candidate	1st round		2nd round			1st round votesTransfer votes, 2nd round
Party	Candidate	Total	Of round	Transfers	Total	Of round	1st round votesTransfer votes, 2nd round
Labour Co-op	Val Shawcross	1,137	52.6%	196	1,333	76.6	
Conservative	Jason Perry	327	15.1%	80	407	23.4	
Taking the Initiative	Farah London	214	9.9%				
Liberal Democrats	Richard Howard	174	8.1%				
Green	Peter Underwood	138	6.4%				
Independent	Andrew Pelling	98	4.5%				
Independent	Winston McKenzie	51	2.4%				
Independent	Gavin Palmer	21	1.0%				
Total votes		2,214					
Registered electors		8,434					

==== Selsdon & Addington Village ====
Selsdon & Addington Village
Party	Candidate	1st round		2nd round			1st round votesTransfer votes, 2nd round
Party	Candidate	Total	Of round	Transfers	Total	Of round	1st round votesTransfer votes, 2nd round
Conservative	Jason Perry	1,640	49.8%	290	1,930	72.7	
Labour Co-op	Val Shawcross	566	17.2%	158	724	27.3	
Independent	Andrew Pelling	383	11.6%				
Liberal Democrats	Richard Howard	271	8.2%				
Green	Peter Underwood	188	5.7%				
Taking the Initiative	Farah London	171	5.2%				
Independent	Winston McKenzie	41	1.2%				
Independent	Gavin Palmer	34	1.0%				
Total votes		3,357					
Registered electors		7,981					

==== Selsdon Vale & Forestdale ====
Selsdon Vale & Forestdale
Party	Candidate	1st round		2nd round			1st round votesTransfer votes, 2nd round
Party	Candidate	Total	Of round	Transfers	Total	Of round	1st round votesTransfer votes, 2nd round
Conservative	Jason Perry	1,597	53.4%	231	1,828	76.5	
Labour Co-op	Val Shawcross	425	14.2%	135	560	23.5	
Independent	Andrew Pelling	348	11.6%				
Liberal Democrats	Richard Howard	245	8.2%				
Taking the Initiative	Farah London	159	5.3%				
Green	Peter Underwood	144	4.8%				
Independent	Gavin Palmer	36	1.2%				
Independent	Winston McKenzie	35	1.2%				
Total votes		3,021					
Registered electors		7,328					

==== Shirley North ====
Shirley North
Party	Candidate	1st round		2nd round			1st round votesTransfer votes, 2nd round
Party	Candidate	Total	Of round	Transfers	Total	Of round	1st round votesTransfer votes, 2nd round
Conservative	Jason Perry	1,756	42.5%	297	2,053	61.9	
Labour Co-op	Val Shawcross	1,046	25.3%	220	1,266	38.1	
Independent	Andrew Pelling	416	10.1%				
Liberal Democrats	Richard Howard	385	9.3%				
Taking the Initiative	Farah London	227	5.5%				
Green	Peter Underwood	188	4.6%				
Independent	Gavin Palmer	66	1.6%				
Independent	Winston McKenzie	44	1.1%				
Total votes		4,195					
Registered electors		11,735					

==== Shirley South ====
Shirley South
Party	Candidate	1st round		2nd round			1st round votesTransfer votes, 2nd round
Party	Candidate	Total	Of round	Transfers	Total	Of round	1st round votesTransfer votes, 2nd round
Conservative	Jason Perry	1,299	40.9%	251	1,550	61.2	
Labour Co-op	Val Shawcross	826	26.0%	156	982	38.8	
Independent	Andrew Pelling	451	14.2%				
Liberal Democrats	Richard Howard	229	7.2%				
Taking the Initiative	Farah London	155	4.9%				
Green	Peter Underwood	141	4.4%				
Independent	Gavin Palmer	47	1.5%				
Independent	Winston McKenzie	25	0.8%				
Total votes		3,199					
Registered electors		8,198					

==== South Croydon ====
South Croydon
Party	Candidate	1st round		2nd round			1st round votesTransfer votes, 2nd round
Party	Candidate	Total	Of round	Transfers	Total	Of round	1st round votesTransfer votes, 2nd round
Conservative	Jason Perry	1,718	36.1%	292	2,010	53.8	
Labour Co-op	Val Shawcross	1,362	28.6%	365	1,727	46.2	
Liberal Democrats	Richard Howard	505	10.6%				
Independent	Andrew Pelling	432	9.1%				
Green	Peter Underwood	325	6.8%				
Taking the Initiative	Farah London	269	5.7%				
Independent	Gavin Palmer	96	2.0%				
Independent	Winston McKenzie	51	1.1%				
Total votes		4,806					
Registered electors		12,465					

==== South Norwood ====
South Norwood
Party	Candidate	1st round		2nd round			1st round votesTransfer votes, 2nd round
Party	Candidate	Total	Of round	Transfers	Total	Of round	1st round votesTransfer votes, 2nd round
Labour Co-op	Val Shawcross	1,572	45.6%	401	1,973	76.1	
Taking the Initiative	Farah London	533	15.5%				
Conservative	Jason Perry	485	14.1%	135	620	23.9	
Liberal Democrats	Richard Howard	312	9.1%				
Green	Peter Underwood	283	8.2%				
Independent	Andrew Pelling	156	4.5%				
Independent	Winston McKenzie	68	2.0%				
Independent	Gavin Palmer	35	1.0%				
Total votes		3,520					
Registered electors		11,540					

==== Thornton Heath ====
Thornton Heath
Party	Candidate	1st round		2nd round			1st round votesTransfer votes, 2nd round
Party	Candidate	Total	Of round	Transfers	Total	Of round	1st round votesTransfer votes, 2nd round
Labour Co-op	Val Shawcross	1,922	52.2%	299	2,221	78.1	
Conservative	Jason Perry	501	13.6%	123	624	21.9	
Liberal Democrats	Richard Howard	348	9.5%				
Taking the Initiative	Farah London	334	9.1%				
Green	Peter Underwood	281	7.6%				
Independent	Andrew Pelling	145	3.9%				
Independent	Winston McKenzie	91	2.5%				
Independent	Gavin Palmer	59	1.6%				
Total votes		3,777					
Registered electors		12,429					

==== Waddon ====
Waddon
Party	Candidate	1st round		2nd round			1st round votesTransfer votes, 2nd round
Party	Candidate	Total	Of round	Transfers	Total	Of round	1st round votesTransfer votes, 2nd round
Labour Co-op	Val Shawcross	1,402	34.7%	305	1,707	53.8	
Conservative	Jason Perry	1,236	30.6%	227	1,463	46.2	
Independent	Andrew Pelling	503	12.5%				
Liberal Democrats	Richard Howard	287	7.1%				
Taking the Initiative	Farah London	246	6.1%				
Green	Peter Underwood	240	5.9%				
Independent	Gavin Palmer	66	1.6%				
Independent	Winston McKenzie	60	1.5%				
Total votes		4,101					
Registered electors		12,845					

==== West Thornton ====
West Thornton
Party	Candidate	1st round		2nd round			1st round votesTransfer votes, 2nd round
Party	Candidate	Total	Of round	Transfers	Total	Of round	1st round votesTransfer votes, 2nd round
Labour Co-op	Val Shawcross	1,846	55.3%	205	2,051	71.8	
Conservative	Jason Perry	704	21.1%	100	804	28.2	
Taking the Initiative	Farah London	209	6.3%				
Liberal Democrats	Richard Howard	200	6.0%				
Independent	Andrew Pelling	131	3.9%				
Green	Peter Underwood	128	3.8%				
Independent	Winston McKenzie	78	2.3%				
Independent	Gavin Palmer	40	1.2%				
Total votes		3,432					
Registered electors		12,554					

==== Woodside ====
Woodside
Party	Candidate	1st round		2nd round			1st round votesTransfer votes, 2nd round
Party	Candidate	Total	Of round	Transfers	Total	Of round	1st round votesTransfer votes, 2nd round
Labour Co-op	Val Shawcross	1,981	49.5%	411	2,392	74.8	
Conservative	Jason Perry	661	16.5%	145	806	25.2	
Liberal Democrats	Richard Howard	382	9.6%				
Taking the Initiative	Farah London	375	9.4%				
Green	Peter Underwood	295	7.4%				
Independent	Andrew Pelling	186	4.7%				
Independent	Winston McKenzie	79	2.0%				
Independent	Gavin Palmer	40	1.0%				
Total votes		4,089					
Registered electors		12,302					

== 2022–2026 by-elections ==
=== South Croydon ===
South Croydon by-election, 30 June 2022
Party	Candidate	Votes	%	±%
Conservative	Danielle Denton	1,306	42.9	▲2.9
Labour	Benjamin Taylor	821	27.0	▼2.1
Liberal Democrats	John Jefkins	448	14.7	▲0.6
Green	Peter Underwood	269	8.8	▼5.3
Independent	Andrew Pelling	158	5.2	New
UKIP	Kathleen Garner	25	0.8	▼1.7
Independent	Mark Samuel	18	0.6	New
Majority		485	15.9	▲5.0
Turnout		3,051		
Conservative hold		Swing	▲2.5	

The South Croydon by-election was triggered by the election of councillor Jason Perry as Mayor of Croydon on 5 May 2022.

=== Selsdon Vale and Forestdale ===
Selsdon Vale and Forestdale by-election, 3 November 2022
Party	Candidate	Votes	%	±%
Conservative	Fatima Zaman	983	46.3	▼21.2
Green	Peter Underwood	530	24.9	▲8.8
Labour	Thomas Bowell	372	17.5	▲1.0
Independent	Andrew Pelling	168	7.9	New
Liberal Democrats	George Holland	72	3.4	New
Majority		453	21.4	▼44.2
Turnout		2,125	29.59	
Conservative hold		Swing		

=== Park Hill and Whitgift ===
Park Hill and Whitgift by-election, 2 May 2024
Party	Candidate	Votes	%	±%
Conservative	Andrew Price	960	42.9	▼10.8
Labour	Melanie Felten	701	31.4	▲7.9
Liberal Democrats	Andrew Pelling	295	13.2	▲3.9
Green	James Cork	229	10.2	▼0.4
Independent	Mark Samuel	32	1.4	New
TUSC	Ben Goldstone	19	0.8	New
Majority		259	11.6	▼18.6
Turnout		2,248	51.8	▲9.7
Registered electors		4,336		
Conservative hold		Swing	▼9.4	

The Park Hill and Whitgift by-election was triggered by the resignation of Conservative councillor Jade Appleton.

=== Woodside ===
Woodside by-election, 2 May 2024
Party	Candidate	Votes	%	±%
Labour	Jessica Rich	2,305	48.5	▼2.6
Conservative	Titilope Adeoye	1,014	21.3	▲2.8
Green	Nicholas Burman-Vince	641	13.5	▲0.2
Liberal Democrats	Jahir Hussain	487	10.2	▼0.8
Taking the Initiative	Shane Sobers	150	3.1	▼2.7
TUSC	Michelle Wall	82	1.7	N/A
Majority		1,291	27.2	
Turnout		4,745	37.9	▲4.8
Registered electors		12,518		▲2.44
Labour hold		Swing	▼2.73	

The Woodside by-election was triggered by the resignation of Labour councillor Mike Bonello.
