= Norbury and Pollards Hill =

- Electoral ward for the Croydon London Borough Council
- Norbury and Pollards Hill ward boundaries
- Borough: Croydon
- County: Greater London
- Population: 12,145 (2021)
- Electorate: 8,740 (2022)
- Major settlements: Norbury
- Area: 1.308 square kilometres (0.505 sq mi)

Current electoral ward
- Created: 2018
- Number of members: 2
- Councillors: Leila Ben-Hassel; John Wentworth
- Created from: Norbury
- GSS code: E05011472

Norbury and Pollards Hill is an electoral ward in the London Borough of Croydon. The ward was first used in the 2018 elections. It returns two councillors to Croydon London Borough Council.

== List of Councillors ==
Election	Councillor	Party	Councillor	Party
2018	Ward created			
2018	Maggie Mansell	Labour	Shafi Khan	Labour
2021	Leila Ben-Hassel	Labour	Shafi Khan	Labour
2022	Leila Ben-Hassel	Labour	Matthew Griffiths	Labour
2026	Leila Ben-Hassel	Labour	John Wentworth	Labour

== Mayoral election results ==
Below are the results for the candidate which received the highest share of the popular vote in the ward at each mayoral election.

Year	Mayoral Election	Mayoral candidate	Party	Winner?
2021	Mayor of London	Sadiq Khan	Labour	✓
2022	Mayor of Croydon	Val Shawcross	Labour	✗
2026	Mayor of Croydon	Rowenna Davis	Labour	✗

== Croydon council elections ==
=== 2026 election ===
The election took place on 7 May 2026.

2026 Croydon London Borough Council election: Norbury and Pollards Hill
Party	Candidate	Votes	%	±%
Labour	Leila Ben-Hassel	1,235	38.7	−15.0
Labour	John Wentworth	979	30.7	
Green	Karim Benze	923	29.0	
Green	Ferha Syed	878	27.5	
Conservative	Shakera Bowen	511	16.0	
Conservative	Tirena Gunter	490	15.4	
Reform	Pabiltan Parameswaran	306	9.6	
Reform	Bryan Whicher	283	8.9	
Liberal Democrats	Steven Penketh	282	8.8	
Turnout		3,188	36.67	+5.71
Labour hold		Swing		
Labour hold		Swing		

=== 2022 election ===
The election took place on 5 May 2022.

2022 Croydon London Borough Council election: Norbury and Pollards Hill (2)
Party	Candidate	Votes	%	±%
Labour Co-op	Leila Ben-Hassel	1,276		
Labour Co-op	Matthew Griffiths	1,152		
Conservative	Tirena Gunter	622		
Conservative	Mike Mogul	495		
Liberal Democrats	Christopher Adams	315		
Green	Cheryl Zimmerman	252		
Green	Larissa Amor	250		
Liberal Democrats	Mark Chalmers	188		
Taking the Initiative	Ghazala Akhtar	101		
Taking the Initiative	Laura Manser	97		
Turnout		2,706	30.96	
Registered electors		8,740		
Labour Co-op hold		Swing		
Labour Co-op hold		Swing		

=== 2019 by-election ===
The by-election took place on 14 March 2019, following the death of Maggie Mansell.

2019 Norbury and Pollards Hill by-election
Party	Candidate	Votes	%	±%
Labour	Leila Ben-Hassel	1,379	64.5	▼3.3
Conservative	Tirena Gunter	324	15.2	▼6.9
Independent	Mark O'Grady	162	7.6	▲7.6
Green	Rachel Chance	91	4.3	▼6.0
Independent	Malgorzata Roznerska	72	3.4	▲3.4
Liberal Democrats	Guy Burchett	70	3.3	▲3.3
UKIP	Kathleen Garner	40	1.9	▲1.9
Majority		1,055		
Turnout		2,145	25.3	
Labour hold		Swing		

=== 2018 election ===
The election took place on 3 May 2018.

2018 Croydon London Borough Council election: Norbury and Pollards Hill (2)
Party	Candidate	Votes	%	±%
Labour	Maggie Mansell	1,981	34.23	
Labour	Shafi Khan	1,934	33.42	
Conservative	Calum Bardsley	644	11.13	
Conservative	Mike Mogul	638	11.02	
Green	Stephen Amor	299	5.17	
Green	Cheryl Zimmerman	291	5.03	
Majority		1,290	22.29	
Turnout				
Labour hold		Swing		
Labour hold		Swing		
