= Woodside (Croydon ward) =

Electoral ward in the London borough of Croydon

Coordinates: 51.399°N 0.066°W

- ward for Croydon Council
- Boundary of Woodside in Croydon from 2018.
- County: Greater London

Current ward
- Created: 1964
- Councillor: Jess Rich (Labour)
- Councillor: Amy Foster (Labour)
- Councillor: Brigitte Graham (Labour)
- Number of councillors: Three (2002-Present), Two (1978–2002), Three (1964–1978)
- UK Parliament constituency: Croydon East

Woodside is an electoral ward in the London Borough of Croydon. The ward has existed since the creation of the borough on 1 April 1965 and was first used in the 1964 elections. It returns councillors to Croydon London Borough Council. The ward covers the Woodside area. On 6 May 2021, 5 by-elections were held in Croydon following the resignation of 5 councillors across New Addington North, South Norwood, Kenley, Park Hill and Whitgift and Woodside. Two current councillors were elected in the 2022 London local elections. A by-election, caused by the resignation of Mike Bonello, was held on 2 May 2024.

== List of councillors ==
| Election | Councillor | Party | Councillor | Party | Councillor | Party |
|---|---|---|---|---|---|---|
| 2018 | Tony Newman | Labour | Hamida Ali | Labour | Paul Scott | Labour |
| 2021 by-election | Mike Bonello | Labour | Hamida Ali | Labour | Paul Scott | Labour |
| 2022 | Mike Bonello | Labour | Amy Foster | Labour | Brigitte Graham | Labour |
| 2024 by-election | Jess Rich | Labour | Amy Foster | Labour | Brigitte Graham | Labour |

== Croydon council elections since 2018 ==
Woodside ward boundaries since 2018

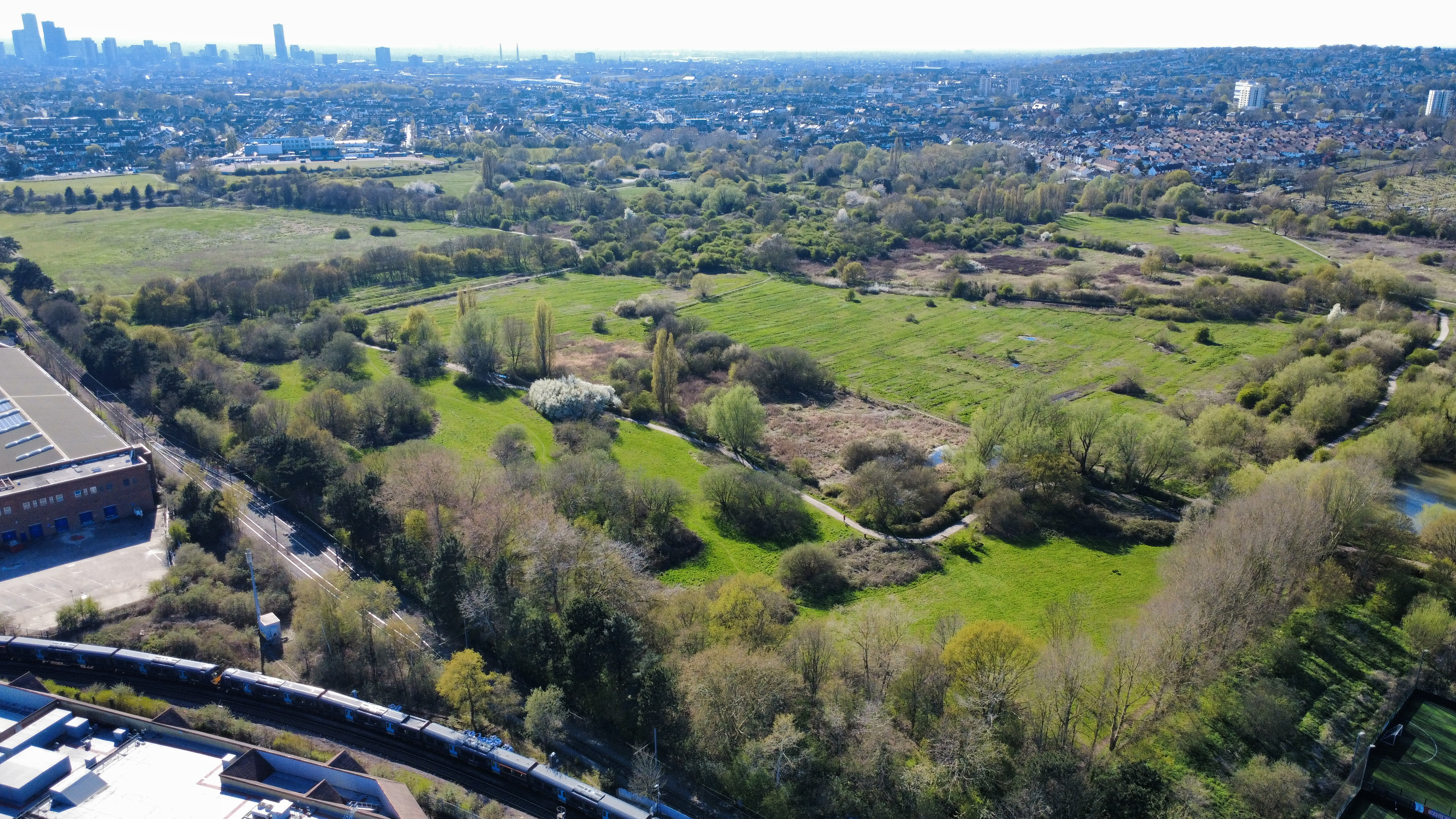
Looking WSW across Woodside Ward over South Norwood Country Park at its eastern limit by Elmers End Road

There was a revision of ward boundaries in Croydon in 2018.

=== 2024 by-election ===
The by-election was held on 2 May 2024, following the resignation of Mike Bonello. It took place on the same day as the 2024 London mayoral election, the 2024 London Assembly election and 14 other borough council by-elections across London.

2024 Woodside by-election
| Party | Candidate | Votes | % | ±% |
|---|---|---|---|---|
| Labour | Jess Rich | 2,305 | 48.5 | ▼2.62 |
| Conservative | Titilope Adeoye | 1,014 | 21.3 | ▲2.84 |
| Green | Nicholas Burman-Vince | 641 | 13.5 | ▲0.02 |
| Liberal Democrats | Jahir Hussain | 487 | 10.2 | ▼0.87 |
| Taking the Initiative | Shane Sobers | 150 | 3.1 | ▼2.75 |
| TUSC | Michelle Wall | 82 | 1.7 | — |
| Turnout | | 4,745 | 38 | ▲4.88 |
| Registered electors | | 12,518 | | ▲2.44 |
| Labour hold | | Swing | 2.73 | |

=== 2022 election ===
The election took place on 5 May 2022.

2022 Croydon London Borough Council election: Woodside (3)
| Party | Candidate | Votes | % | ±% |
|---|---|---|---|---|
| Labour | Mike Bonello | 2,098 | 51.12 | ▲3.61 |
| Labour | Amy Foster | 1,938 | — | |
| Labour | Brigitte Graham | 1,763 | — | |
| Conservative | Titilope Adeoye | 741 | 18.46 | ▼7.85 |
| Conservative | Rebecca Natrajan | 678 | — | |
| Conservative | Des Wright | 675 | — | |
| Green | Pravina Ellis | 548 | 13.48 | ▲8.46 |
| Green | Elaine Garrod | 492 | — | |
| Green | Frances Fearon | 489 | — | |
| Liberal Democrats | Jane Waterhouse | 463 | 11.07 | ▲5.31 |
| Liberal Democrats | Tomas Howard-Jones | 402 | — | |
| Liberal Democrats | Andrew Rendle | 391 | — | |
| Taking the Initiative | Khataetthaleeya Gibbs | 259 | 5.85 | ▲1.47 |
| Taking the Initiative | Mark Emmanuel | 246 | — | |
| Taking the Initiative | Seugul Metin | 159 | — | |
| Turnout | | 4,075 | 33.12 | ▼7.78 |
| Registered electors | | 12,302 | | ▲0.73 |
| Labour hold | | Swing | 5.73 | |
| Labour hold | | Swing | | |
| Labour hold | | Swing | | |

=== 2021 by-election ===
The by-election was held on 6 May 2021. It was held on the same day as the 2021 London mayoral election and 2021 London Assembly election.

2021 Woodside by-election
| Party | Candidate | Votes | % | ±% |
|---|---|---|---|---|
| Labour | Mike Bonello | 2,375 | 47.51 | ▼13.19 |
| Conservative | Michelle Kazi | 1315 | 26.31 | ▲7.45 |
| Green | Peter Underwood | 251 | 5.02 | ▼4.01 |
| Liberal Democrats | Andrew Rendle | 288 | 5.76 | ▲0.81 |
| Taking the Initiative | Alison Johnson | 219 | 4.38 | — |
| Independent | Ian Bone | 125 | 2.50 | — |
| Independent | Mark Robin Lionel Samuel | 40 | 0.8 | — |
| Turnout | | 4998 | 40.9 | ▲6.06 |
| Registered electors | | 12,212 | | ▼2.87 |
| Labour hold | | Swing | 10.67 | |

=== 2018 election ===
The election took place on 3 May 2018.

2018 Croydon London Borough Council election: Woodside (3)
| Party | Candidate | Votes | % | ±% |
|---|---|---|---|---|
| Labour | Tony Newman | 2,647 | 60.70 | — |
| Labour | Hamida Ali | 2,539 | — | — |
| Labour | Paul William Scott | 2,446 | — | — |
| Conservative | Rebecca Natrajan | 823 | 18.86 | — |
| Conservative | Eray Arda Akartuna | 782 | — | — |
| Conservative | Mustafa Osman Tary | 767 | — | — |
| Green | Christopher David Brann | 460 | 9.03 | — |
| Green | Elaine Denise Garrod | 362 | — | — |
| Green | Lydia Jane Regan | 314 | — | — |
| Liberal Democrats | Hilary Jane Waterhouse | 322 | 6.57 | — |
| Liberal Democrats | Sam Bayes | 293 | — | — |
| Liberal Democrats | Luke Robert Bonham | 212 | — | — |
| Turnout | | 4191 | 34.84 | — |
| Registered electors | | 12,573 | | — |
| Labour win (new boundaries) | | | | |
| Labour win (new boundaries) | | | | |
| Labour win (new boundaries) | | | | |

== 2002–2018 Croydon council elections ==
Woodside ward boundaries from 2002 to 2018

There was a revision of ward boundaries in Croydon in 2002.

== 1978–2002 Croydon council elections ==
There was a revision of ward boundaries in Croydon in 1978.

== 1964–1978 Croydon council elections ==
=== 1964 election ===
The election took place on 7 May 1964.

== Croydon mayoral elections ==
Below are the results for the candidate which received the highest share of the popular vote in the ward at each mayoral election.

| Year | Mayoral candidate | Party | Winner? |
|---|---|---|---|
| 2022 | Val Shawcross | Labour | ✗ |
