= Addiscombe West =

Electoral ward in the London borough of Croydon

Coordinates: 51.381°N 0.081°W

- ward for Croydon Council
- Boundary of Addiscombe West in Croydon from 2018.
- County: Greater London

Current ward
- Created: 2018
- Councillor: Sean Fitzsimons (Labour)
- Councillor: Clive Fraser (Labour)
- Councillor: Patricia Hay-Justice (Labour)
- Number of councillors: Three
- Created from: Addiscombe
- UK Parliament constituency: Croydon East

Addiscombe West is a ward in the London Borough of Croydon, covering much of the Addiscombe and East Croydon areas of London in the United Kingdom. It extends from East Croydon railway station towards Woodside Green but does not actually cover the retail centre of Addiscombe, which is in the neighbouring Addiscombe East ward.

For the 2018 London local elections, the ward has been created, consisting of most of the former Addiscombe Ward (as well as part of the old Fairfield ward).

The ward currently forms part of the Croydon East constituency, represented by Labour's Natasha Irons.

== List of Councillors ==
Election	Councillor	Party	Councillor	Party	Councillor	Party
2018	Ward created					
2018	Sean Fitzsimons	Labour Co-op	Jerry Fitzpatrick	Labour Co-op	Patricia Hay-Justice	Labour Co-op
2022	Sean Fitzsimons	Labour Co-op	Clive Fraser	Labour Co-op	Patricia Hay-Justice	Labour Co-op

== Mayoral election results ==
Below are the results for the candidate which received the highest share of the popular vote in the ward at each Croydon mayoral election.

Year	Mayoralty	Mayoral candidate	Party	Winner?
2021	Mayor of London	Sadiq Khan	Labour	✓
2022	Mayor of Croydon	Val Shawcross	Labour	✗
2026	Mayor of Croydon	Rowenna Davis	Labour	✗

== Ward results ==
Croydon Council Election 2026: Addiscombe West (3)
Party	Candidate	Votes	%	±%
Labour Co-op	Nick Beall*	1,547	12.3	−
Labour Co-op	Patricia Hay-Justice*	1,530	12.2	+3.3
Labour Co-op	Sean Fitzsimons*	1,540	12.17	−1.2
Green	Antony Robert Coward	1,134	9.0	
Green	Adrian Robert Douglas	1,100	8.8	
Green	Saba Shafique Khan	1,088	8.7	
Conservative	Brad Michael Cook	706	5.6	
Conservative	Vidhi Mohan	626	5.0	
Conservative	Ranjiv Nagi	573	4.5	
Reform	Paul Reeder	573	4.5	
Reform	Richard Waddingham	533	4.2	
Reform	Leon Wright	499	3.9	
Liberal Democrats	Susan Ashby-Adams	416	4.4	
Liberal Democrats	Sasa Konecni	288	2.3	
Liberal Democrats	Szymon Zaborski	253	2.0	
Trade Union and Socialist Coalition	Athena Alexandra Chidera Reid	74	0.5	
Turnout		12493	39	+7
Labour hold		Swing		
Labour hold		Swing		
Labour hold		Swing		

Croydon Council Election 2022: Addiscombe West (3)
Party	Candidate	Votes	%	±%
Labour Co-op	Sean Fitzsimons*	1,540	16.2	
Labour Co-op	Patricia Hay-Justice*	1,480	15.6	
Labour Co-op	Clive Fraser†	1,305	13.7	
Conservative	Michael Norman	913	9.6	
Conservative	Kosta Dexiades	816	8.6	
Conservative	Fatima Zaman	771	8.1	
Green	Kerry Akif	522	5.5	
Green	Tracey Hague	465	4.9	
Liberal Democrats	Peter Ladanyi	416	4.4	
Green	Joseph Hague	397	4.2	
Liberal Democrats	Sasa Konecni	395	4.2	
Liberal Democrats	Andrew John Thynne	331	3.5	
Animal Welfare	Saffron Gloyne	155	1.6	
Turnout		3,512	32.01	
Labour hold		Swing		
Labour hold		Swing		
Labour hold		Swing		

Croydon Council Election 2018: Addiscombe West (3)
Party	Candidate	Votes	%	±%
Labour Co-op	Sean Eamonn Fitzsimons	2,146	17.8	
Labour Co-op	Jerry Fitzpatrick	2,138	17.8	
Labour Co-op	Patricia Hay-Justice	1,992	16.6	
Conservative	Jade Nadine Appleton	1,280	10.6	
Conservative	Lindsey Blackburn	1,127	9.3	
Conservative	Michael John O'Dwyer	1,101	9.2	
Green	Esther Sutton	494	4.1	
Green	Tracey Jo Hague	285	2.4	
Green	Joe Hague	269	2.3	
Liberal Democrats	Rachel Louise Howard	239	2.0	
Liberal Democrats	Sasa Konechni	215	1.8	
Liberal Democrats	Peter Steven Ladanyi	175	1.5	
Majority		712	6.21	
Turnout		4,000	38.57	
Labour win (new seat)				
Labour win (new seat)				
Labour win (new seat)				
