= 2010 Croydon London Borough Council election =

2010 local election in England

Croydon Council Election, 2010
- 6 May 2010

All 70 seats to Croydon London Borough Council 36 seats needed for a majority
	First party	Second party
Leader	Mike Fisher	Tony Newman
Party	Conservative	Labour
Leader since	2005	2005
Leader's seat	Shirley	Woodside
Last election	43 seats, 44.8%	27 seats, 25.9%
Seats won	37	33
Seat change	▼6	▲6
Popular vote	66,000	55,868
Percentage	37.0%	31.3%
Swing	▼7.8%	▲5.4%
- Map of the results of the 2010 Croydon council election. Conservatives in blue and Labour in red.
Leader of the Council before election
Mike Fisher
Conservative
Elected Leader
Mike Fisher
Conservative

Elections for Croydon Council in London were held on 6 May 2010. The 2010 United Kingdom General Election and other local elections took place on the same day.

In London council elections the entire council is elected every four years, as opposed to some local elections where one councillor is elected every year in three of the four years.

An election petition was lodged against the result in the Waddon ward, concerning allegations that not all voters who wished to vote on election day were allowed to vote. The case, supported by the Electoral Commission as a test case, was later withdrawn at the High Court

== Overall results ==
Croydon local election result 2010
Party	Seats	Gains	Losses	Net gain/loss	Seats %	Votes %	Votes	+/−
Conservative	37			-6	52.9	37.0	66,000	-7.8
Labour	33			+6	47.1	31.3	55,868	+5.4
Liberal Democrats	0			0		18.4	32,801	+5.0
Green	0			0		7.5	13,310	-1.7
UKIP	0			0		2.4	4,231	-0.7
BNP	0			0		1.9	3,363	+0.6
Independent	0			0		0.7	1,257	-0.3
CPA	0			0		0.4	733	N/A
Communist	0			0		0.2	289	±0.0
Putting Croydon First	0			0		0.1	218	N/A
Monster Raving Loony	0			0		0.1	181	-0.1

↓
37	33
Conservative	Labour

== Ward Results ==
=== Addiscombe ===
Addiscombe (3)
Party	Candidate	Votes	%	±%
Labour	Sean Fitzsimons	2,839	38.4	
Labour	Mark Watson	2,683	36.3	
Labour	Patricia Hay-Justice	2,497	33.8	
Conservative	Maria de la Huerta	2,445	33.1	
Conservative	Andrew Price	2,171	29.4	
Conservative	Robert King	2,076	28.1	
Liberal Democrats	Christopher Adams	1,569	21.2	
Liberal Democrats	Gavin Howard-Jones	1,400	19.0	
Liberal Democrats	Ejnar Sorensen	1,195	16.2	
Green	Tracey Hague	432	5.9	
Green	David Petro	353	4.8	
Green	Martyn Post	352	4.8	
UKIP	Peter Staveley	296	4.0	
Turnout		7,387	62.9%	
Registered electors		11,748		
Labour gain from Conservative		Swing		
Labour gain from Conservative		Swing		
Labour gain from Conservative		Swing		

=== Ashburton ===
Ashburton (3)
Party	Candidate	Votes	%	±%
Conservative	Edwin Arram	3,175		
Conservative	Avril Slipper	2,974		
Conservative	Adam Kellett	2,866		
Labour	Mark Justice	2,234		
Labour	Madelaine Goulder	2,206		
Labour	Shorish Barzinji	1,979		
Liberal Democrats	Peter Ladanyi	1,290		
Green	Bernice Goldberg	647		
UKIP	David Aina	557		
BNP	Tony Martin	419		
Green	Tim Fernandes-Bonnar	407		
Green	Sergio Petro	385		
Turnout		7,056	66.6%	▲23.9%
Registered electors		10,596		
Conservative hold		Swing		
Conservative hold		Swing		
Conservative hold		Swing		

=== Bensham Manor ===
Bensham Manor (3)
Party	Candidate	Votes	%	±%
Labour	Donna Gray	3,872		
Labour	Alison Butler	3,781		
Labour	Nanoo Rajendran	3,480		
Conservative	Greta Sohoye	1,314		
Green	Shasha Khan	1,194		
Liberal Democrats	Emerson Roberts	1,142		
Conservative	Abdul Talukdar	982		
Conservative	Kazim Walji	950		
Green	Jade Small	791		
Green	Christopher Sciberras	603		
Turnout		6,749	60.1%	
Registered electors		11,235		
Labour hold		Swing		
Labour hold		Swing		
Labour hold		Swing		

=== Broad Green ===
Broad Green (3)
Party	Candidate	Votes	%	±%
Labour	Stuart Collins	3,707		
Labour	Mike Selva	3,451		
Labour	Manju Shahul-Hameed	3,056		
Conservative	Lance Alleyne	1,661		
Conservative	Favion Emmanuel	1,521		
Conservative	Sarah Davis	1,390		
Liberal Democrats	Simon Curran	1,169		
Green	Kiran Choda	378		
Green	Rebecca Samuel	366		
Green	Jay Patel	355		
Communist	Peter Latham	116		
Turnout		6,437	56.0	
Registered electors		11,504		
Labour hold		Swing		
Labour hold		Swing		
Labour hold		Swing		

=== Coulsdon East ===
Coulsdon East (3)
Party	Candidate	Votes	%	±%
Conservative	Christopher Wright	3,609		
Conservative	Justin Cromie	3,431		
Conservative	Theresa Lenton	3,347		
Liberal Democrats	Ian Atkins	2,164		
Liberal Democrats	Ken George	1,851		
Liberal Democrats	Andy Blake	1,735		
Labour	Adrian Dennis	775		
Labour	Moira O'Donnell	696		
Labour	Rae Goonetilleke	649		
UKIP	George Simpson	460		
Green	Ernest Bullimore	349		
BNP	Marie Mccammon	312		
Green	Jay Ginn	267		
Green	Brendan Walsh	184		
Turnout		7,002	70.6%	
Registered electors		9,523		
Conservative hold		Swing		
Conservative hold		Swing		
Conservative hold		Swing		

=== Coulsdon West ===
Coulsdon West (3)
Party	Candidate	Votes	%	±%
Conservative	David Osland	3,656		
Conservative	Ian Parker	3,473		
Conservative	Jeet Bains	3,421		
Liberal Democrats	Avril Bristow	1,608		
Liberal Democrats	Jean Callen	1,465		
Labour	Charles King	1,268		
Liberal Democrats	Brian Glaister	1,255		
Labour	Ronald Rowland	1,107		
Labour	Sarah Ward	1,073		
UKIP	Jo Parsons	492		
Green	Mark Denley	380		
Green	Sue Parsons	326		
Green	Nick Smith	308		
Turnout		7,032	69.2%	
Registered electors		10,161		
Conservative hold		Swing		
Conservative hold		Swing		
Conservative hold		Swing		

=== Croham ===
Croham (3)
Party	Candidate	Votes	%	±%
Conservative	Maria Gatland	3,389		
Conservative	Michael Neal	3,070		
Conservative	Jason Perry	2,804		
Labour	Natalie Allen	1,806		
Liberal Democrats	John Jefkins	1,795		
Liberal Democrats	Martin Camden	1,778		
Liberal Democrats	Simon Rix	1,758		
Labour	Martin Angus	1,512		
Labour	Adam Bonner	1,343		
Green	Stephen Harris	538		
Green	Muriel Passmore	507		
UKIP	William Bailey	444		
Green	Marc Richards	433		
Putting Croydon First	Mark Samuel	218		
Turnout		7,582	67.04%	
Registered electors		11,309		
Conservative hold		Swing		
Conservative hold		Swing		
Conservative hold		Swing		

=== Fairfield ===
Fairfield (3)
Party	Candidate	Votes	%	±%
Conservative	David Fitze	2,751		
Conservative	Vidhi Mohan	2,589		
Conservative	Sue Winborn	2,555		
Labour	Rob Elliott	1,882		
Labour	Dominc O'Donnell	1,806		
Labour	Peter Horah	1,749		
Liberal Democrats	Philip Barron	1,344		
Liberal Democrats	Maria Menezes	1,170		
Liberal Democrats	Arif Mohiuddin	894		
Green	Esther Sutton	441		
Green	Justin Audibert	420		
UKIP	Audrey Norman	372		
Green	Patrick Wedge	312		
Monster Raving Loony	John Cartwright	181		
Turnout		6,571	59.2%	
Registered electors		11,102		
Conservative hold		Swing		
Conservative hold		Swing		
Conservative hold		Swing		

=== Fieldway ===
Fieldway (2)
Party	Candidate	Votes	%	±%
Labour	Simon Hall	1,812		
Labour	Carole Bonner	1,085		
Conservative	Jayne Laville	1,085		
Conservative	Maria Pearson	924		
BNP	John Clarke	583		
Liberal Democrats	Stephen Dering	453		
BNP	Rowena Savage	400		
Green	Eileen Gale	114		
Green	Mick Holloway	101		
Turnout		3,859	55.7%	
Registered electors		6,933		
Labour hold		Swing		
Labour hold		Swing		

=== Heathfield ===
Heathfield (3)
Party	Candidate	Votes	%	±%
Conservative	Margaret Mead	3,963		
Conservative	Jason Cummings	3,912		
Conservative	Helen Pollard	3,672		
Liberal Democrats	Roger Barnett	1,582		
Labour	Angie Sherlock	1,550		
Labour	Raffi Shahul-Hameed	1,196		
Labour	Femi Yusoof	1,071		
Green	Emily Brunton	538		
BNP	Dave Clarke	518		
Green	Matteo Sciberras	397		
Green	Tim Watson	392		
Independent	Edward Taylor	374		
Turnout		7,132	70.6%	
Registered electors		10,098		
Conservative hold		Swing		
Conservative hold		Swing		
Conservative hold		Swing		

=== Kenley ===
Kenley (3)
Party	Candidate	Votes	%	±%
Conservative	Janice Buttinger	4,170		
Conservative	Steve O'Connell	3,980		
Conservative	Steven Hollands	3,914		
Liberal Democrats	Angela Catto	1,699		
Liberal Democrats	James Knight	1,510		
Liberal Democrats	Heather Jefkins	1,289		
Labour	Laura Doughty	1,230		
Labour	Annmarie Kennedy	1,053		
Labour	Mistaun Kabir	924		
Green	Ian Dixon	582		
Green	Anneka Dixon-King	512		
Green	Tom Voute	365		
Turnout		7,424	67.75%	
Registered electors		10,957		
Conservative hold		Swing		
Conservative hold		Swing		
Conservative hold		Swing		

=== New Addington ===
New Addington (2)
Party	Candidate	Votes	%	±%
Conservative	Tony Pearson	1,399		
Labour	George Ayres	1,390		
Conservative	Robert Hughes	1,310		
Labour	Amanda Campbell	1,306		
BNP	Cliff Le May	691		
Liberal Democrats	Stephanie Offer	453		
BNP	Donna Treanor	496		
Green	Jim Clugston	317		
Green	Martin Cousins	174		
Turnout		4,110	57.2%	
Registered electors		7,189		
Conservative gain from Labour		Swing		
Labour hold		Swing		

=== Norbury ===
Norbury (3)
Party	Candidate	Votes	%	±%
Labour	Sherwan Chowdhury	3,666		
Labour	Shafi Khan	3,586		
Labour	Maggie Mansell	3,551		
Conservative	Mike Mogul	2,315		
Conservative	Walter Ross Gower	2,061		
Conservative	Sherman Quintyn	1,974		
Liberal Democrats	Rosemary Aselford	1,480		
Green	Elizabeth De Zoysa	558		
Green	Simon Holland	459		
Green	Stefan Szczelkun	259		
Turnout		7,210	61.7%	
Registered electors		11,682		
Labour hold		Swing		
Labour hold		Swing		
Labour hold		Swing		

=== Purley ===
Purley (3)
Party	Candidate	Votes	%	±%
Conservative	Graham Bass	3,573		
Conservative	Donald Speakman	3,328		
Conservative	Badsha Quadir	3,074		
Liberal Democrats	Gordon Burnett	1,495		
Liberal Democrats	Margaret Burnett	1,495		
Labour	Philip Alexander	1,488		
Liberal Democrats	Olive Abdey	1,462		
Labour	Abigail Coombs	1,170		
Labour	Qaiyum Khan	1,126		
UKIP	Kathleen Garner	506		
Green	Anne Martin	466		
Green	Simon Desorgher	391		
Green	Harris Bokhari	372		
Turnout		7,271	68.0%	
Registered electors		10,691		
Conservative hold		Swing		
Conservative hold		Swing		
Conservative hold		Swing		

=== Sanderstead ===
Sanderstead (3)
Party	Candidate	Votes	%	±%
Conservative	Lynne Hale	4,491		
Conservative	Yvette Hopley	4,301		
Conservative	Timothy Pollard	3,911		
Liberal Democrats	Anne Howard	1,314		
Liberal Democrats	Toby Keynes	1,281		
Liberal Democrats	John-Paul Macnamara	1,067		
Labour	Maggie Conway	928		
Labour	Richard Ackland	926		
Green	James Furze	912		
Labour	Suren Pandita	807		
Green	Linda Lambert	488		
Green	David Pettener			
Turnout		7,125	72.4%	
Registered electors		9,842		
Conservative hold		Swing		
Conservative hold		Swing		
Conservative hold		Swing		

=== Selhurst ===
Selhurst (3)
Party	Candidate	Votes	%	±%
Labour	Timothy Godfrey	3,355		
Labour	Micheal Ryan	3,353		
Labour	Toni Letts	3,324		
Conservative	Mario Creatura	1,407		
Conservative	Roger Taylor	1,286		
Conservative	Daniel Hing	1,240		
Liberal Democrats	Faisal Rahman	1,150		
Green	Megan Braid-Pittordou	516		
Green	Michael Stevens	515		
Green	Meike Benzler	515		
Communist	John Eden	93		
Turnout		6,158	54.5%	
Registered electors		11,295		
Labour hold		Swing		
Labour hold		Swing		
Labour hold		Swing		

=== Selsdon & Ballards ===
Selsdon & Ballards (3)
Party	Candidate	Votes	%	±%
Conservative	Sara Bashford	4,487		
Conservative	Dudley Mead	4,153		
Conservative	Philip Thomas	3,860		
Liberal Democrats	Michael Bishopp	1,573		
Liberal Democrats	Jill George	1,424		
Liberal Democrats	Carl Muller	1,193		
Labour	Stephen Aselford	992		
Labour	Simon Green	907		
Labour	Louise Szpera	739		
BNP	Mark Skinner	399		
Green	Cassie Neill	314		
Green	Jane James	299		
Green	Gordon Ross	216		
Turnout		7,051	73.9%	
Registered electors		9,544		
Conservative hold		Swing		
Conservative hold		Swing		
Conservative hold		Swing		

=== Shirley ===
Shirley (3)
Party	Candidate	Votes	%	±%
Conservative	Janet Marshall	3,765		
Conservative	Richard Chatterjee	3,744		
Conservative	Michael Fisher	3,718		
Labour	Oliver Lewis	1,768		
Labour	Steven Reekie	1,681		
Labour	Lee Findell	1,673		
Liberal Democrats	Stephen Cleary	1,200		
Independent	Marzia Nicodemi-Ehikioya	883		
Green	Liz Bebington	659		
Green	Andy Bebington	575		
UKIP	Sylvia Pescud	483		
BNP	Charlotte Lewis	441		
Green	Judith Makoff	335		
Turnout		7,786	72.5%	
Registered electors		10,733		
Conservative hold		Swing		
Conservative hold		Swing		
Conservative hold		Swing		

=== South Norwood ===
South Norwood (3)
Party	Candidate	Votes	%	±%
Labour	Katharine Bee	3,365	48.7	
Labour	Jane Avis	3,338	48.3	
Labour	Wayne Lawlor	2,942	42.5	
Conservative	Susan Bennett	1,928	27.9	
Conservative	Richard Hough	1,603	23.2	
Conservative	Luke Clancy	1,585	22.9	
Liberal Democrats	David Boyle	1,282	18.5	
Liberal Democrats	Joanna Corbin	1,232	17.8	
Green	Suzanne Ackon	791	11.4	
Green	Jane Hutley	400	5.8	
Green	Ivonne Fernandes-Bonnar	371	5.4	
UKIP	Jonathan Serter	295	4.3	
Turnout		6,897	62.5%	
Registered electors		11,027		
Labour gain from Conservative		Swing		
Labour gain from Conservative		Swing		
Labour hold		Swing		

=== Thornton Heath ===
Thornton Heath (3)
Party	Candidate	Votes	%	±%
Labour	Pat Clouder	2,596		
Labour	Lousia Woodley	2,444		
Labour	Matthew Kyremeh	2,388		
Liberal Democrats	Shiraz Engineer	1,499		
Conservative	Akram Khan	1,469		
Conservative	Michele O'Connell	1,405		
Conservative	Sohail Qureshi	1,147		
Green	Esther Obiri-Darko	773		
CPA	Bonnie Anderson	733		
Green	Julie Wade	707		
Green	Nisha Patel	694		
CPA	Darren Blades	664		
Turnout		6,463	58.5%	
Registered electors		11,050		
Labour hold		Swing		
Labour hold		Swing		
Labour hold		Swing		

=== Upper Norwood ===
Upper Norwood (3)
Party	Candidate	Votes	%	±%
Labour	Pat Ryan	3,657		
Labour	Alisa Flemming	3,440		
Labour	John Wentworth	3,046		
Conservative	Robert Askey	2,070		
Conservative	Gloria Hutchens	1,716		
Conservative	Tirena Gunter	1,661		
Liberal Democrats	Graham Axford	1,484		
Green	Graham Jones	691		
Green	Michael O'Sullivan	681		
Green	Nicholas Vine	367		
UKIP	Joan Tyndall	326		
Turnout		7,060	63.2%	
Registered electors		11,171		
Labour gain from Conservative		Swing		
Labour gain from Conservative		Swing		
Labour hold		Swing		

=== Waddon ===
Waddon (3)
Party	Candidate	Votes	%	±%
Conservative	Tony Harris	2,656		
Conservative	Clare Hilley	2,627		
Conservative	Simon Hoar	2,423		
Labour	Hamida Ali	2,078		
Labour	Joy Prince	2,047		
Labour	Dave Christison	1,927		
Liberal Democrats	Geoffrey Gauge	1,332		
Liberal Democrats	Nicholas Katchis	1,285		
Liberal Democrats	Suzanne Roquette	1,152		
Green	Mary Davey	539		
Green	Grace Onions	501		
Green	Tony Bishop-Weston	493		
Turnout		6,873	60.1%	
Registered electors		11,437		
Conservative hold		Swing		
Conservative hold		Swing		
Conservative hold		Swing		

=== West Thornton ===
West Thornton (3)
Party	Candidate	Votes	%	±%
Labour	Paul Smith	3,736		
Labour	Bernadette Khan	3,694		
Labour	Humayun Kabir	3,658		
Conservative	Simon Brew	1,611		
Conservative	Jacqueline Purcell	1,486		
Conservative	Selva Jeyadeva	1,418		
Liberal Democrats	Lucy Njomo	958		
Green	David Beall	620		
Green	Kiran Datta	392		
Green	Barry Buttigieg	345		
Communist	Ben Stevenson	80		
Turnout		6,656	57.6%	
Registered electors		11,547		
Labour hold		Swing		
Labour hold		Swing		
Labour hold		Swing		

=== Woodside ===
Woodside (3)
Party	Candidate	Votes	%	±%
Labour	Karen Jewitt	3,451		
Labour	Anthony Newman	3,447		
Labour	Paul Scott	3,207		
Conservative	Mark Johnson	1,949		
Conservative	Mervyn Adon-Wint	1,913		
Conservative	Michael O'Dwyer	1,716		
Liberal Democrats	Kirsty Carden	1,136		
Liberal Democrats	Zachary Gauge	894		
Green	Louise Millard	537		
Green	Sam Jones	421		
Green	Karen Seers	311		
Turnout		6,781	62.3%	
Registered electors		10,892		
Labour hold		Swing		
Labour hold		Swing		
Labour hold		Swing		
