= Sanderstead (ward) =

Electoral ward in the London borough of Croydon

- ward for Croydon Council
- Boundary of Sanderstead in Croydon from 2002.
- County: Greater London

Current ward
- Created: 1978
- Councillor: Lynne Hale (Conservative)
- Councillor: Yvette Hopley (Conservative)
- Councillor: Helen Redfern (Conservative)
- Number of councillors: Three (2002-Present), Two (1978-2002)
- Created from: Sanderstead and Selsdon
- UK Parliament constituency: Croydon South

Sanderstead is a ward in the London Borough of Croydon. The ward received boundary changes in 2018, gaining territory from Croham ward, but losing Riddlesdown to Purley Oaks and Riddlesdown ward. The first election with new boundaries was 3 May 2018.

== List of Councillors ==
| Election | Councillor | Party | Councillor | Party | Councillor | Party |
|---|---|---|---|---|---|---|
| 1978 | Ward created | | | | | |
| 1978 | David N. Bowen | Conservative | Ronald W. Haskins | Conservative | 2 Councillors; 1978-2002 | |
| 1986 | Colin J. Hood | Conservative | Bruce T. H. Marshall | Conservative | 2 Councillors; 1978-2002 | |
| 1990 | Graham T. W. Speed | Conservative | Bruce T. H. Marshall | Conservative | 2 Councillors; 1978-2002 | |
| 1995 | Graham T. W. Speed | Conservative | Eric Shaw | Conservative | 2 Councillors; 1978-2002 | |
| 1998 | Lynne Hale | Conservative | Eric Shaw | Conservative | 2 Councillors; 1978-2002 | |
| 2002 | Lynne Hale | Conservative | Eric Shaw | Conservative | Timothy S. Pollard | Conservative |
| 2006 | Lynne Hale | Conservative | Yvette Hopley | Conservative | Timothy S. Pollard | Conservative |
| 2022 | Lynne Hale | Conservative | Yvette Hopley | Conservative | Helen Redfern | Conservative |

== Mayoral elections ==
Below are the results for the candidate which received the highest share of the popular vote in the ward at each mayoral election.

| Year | Mayoralty | Mayoral candidate | Party | Winner? |
|---|---|---|---|---|
| 2004 | Mayor of London | Steven Norris | Conservative | ✗ |
| 2008 | Mayor of London | Boris Johnson | Conservative | ✓ |
| 2012 | Mayor of London | Boris Johnson | Conservative | ✓ |
| 2016 | Mayor of London | Zac Goldsmith | Conservative | ✗ |
| 2021 | Mayor of London | Shaun Bailey | Conservative | ✗ |
| 2022 | Mayor of Croydon | Jason Perry | Conservative | ✓ |
| 2026 | Mayor of Croydon | Jason Perry | Conservative | ✓ |

== Ward Results ==
Croydon Council Election 2022: Sanderstead (3)
| Party | Candidate | Votes | % | ±% |
|---|---|---|---|---|
| Conservative | Yvette Hopley* | 3,826 | | |
| Conservative | Lynne Hale* | 3,806 | | |
| Conservative | Helen Redfern† | 3,596 | | |
| Liberal Democrats | James Clark | 718 | | |
| Liberal Democrats | Annie Jordan | 705 | | |
| Labour | Laura Doughty | 658 | | |
| Green | Helen Buckland | 591 | | |
| Labour | Alan Malarkey | 572 | | |
| Labour | Tim Rodgers | 549 | | |
| Liberal Democrats | Edward Wells | 510 | | |
| Green | Connie Muir | 465 | | |
| Green | Oliver Duxbury | 407 | | |
| Turnout | | | 48.36 | |
| Conservative hold | | Swing | | |
| Conservative hold | | Swing | | |
| Conservative hold | | Swing | | |

Croydon Council Election 2018: Sanderstead (3)
| Party | Candidate | Votes | % | ±% |
|---|---|---|---|---|
| Conservative | Lynne Carol Hale | 3,971 | 24.26 | |
| Conservative | Yvette Rose Hopley | 3,954 | 24.15 | |
| Conservative | Timothy Stuart Pollard | 3,844 | 23.48 | |
| Labour | Paul Wyn Ednyfed Ainscough | 908 | 5.55 | |
| Labour | Lynda Graham | 904 | 5.52 | |
| Labour | Joshua Jeremy Jack Andrew | 853 | 5.21 | |
| Liberal Democrats | John Malcolm Jefkins | 498 | 3.04 | |
| Liberal Democrats | Annie Samantha Jordan | 462 | 2.82 | |
| Liberal Democrats | Keith Miller | 357 | 2.18 | |
| Green | Matt Bullock | 334 | 2.04 | |
| Green | Hanna Caroline Short | 285 | 1.74 | |
| Majority | | 2,936 | 17.94 | |
| Turnout | | | | |
| Conservative hold | | Swing | | |
| Conservative hold | | Swing | | |
| Conservative hold | | Swing | | |

Croydon Council Election 2014: Sanderstead (3)
| Party | Candidate | Votes | % | ±% |
|---|---|---|---|---|
| Conservative | Lynne Hale | 2,691 | | |
| Conservative | Yvette Hopley | 2,545 | | |
| Conservative | Tim Pollard | 2,463 | | |
| UKIP | Claire Smith | 891 | | |
| Labour | Mathew Hill | 570 | | |
| Labour | Thomas Lovesey | 540 | | |
| Labour | Stella Nabukeera | 491 | | |
| Green | Diane Bindman | 422 | | |
| Green | Stephen Harris | 316 | | |
| Green | Marc Richards | 295 | | |
| Liberal Democrats | Thomas Hesmondhalgh | 266 | | |
| Liberal Democrats | Elizabeth Moran | 242 | | |
| Liberal Democrats | Toby Keynes | 208 | | |
| Majority | | | | |
| Turnout | | | | |
| Conservative hold | | Swing | | |
| Conservative hold | | Swing | | |
| Conservative hold | | Swing | | |

Croydon Council Election 2006: Sanderstead (3)
| Party | Candidate | Votes | % | ±% |
|---|---|---|---|---|
| Conservative | Lynne Hale | 3,567 | | |
| Conservative | Timothy Pollard | 3,470 | | |
| Conservative | Yvette Hopley | 3,447 | | |
| Liberal Democrats | Anne Howard | 570 | | |
| Liberal Democrats | Susan Gauge | 562 | | |
| Labour | Daniel Harvey | 429 | | |
| Labour | Barry Buttigieg | 393 | | |
| Labour | Tejinder Madhar | 369 | | |
| UKIP | Alan Smith | 338 | | |
| Turnout | | 4,700 | 48.6% | |
| Registered electors | | 9,663 | | |
| Conservative hold | | Swing | | |
| Conservative hold | | Swing | | |
| Conservative hold | | Swing | | |

Croydon Council Election 2002: Sanderstead (3)
| Party | Candidate | Votes | % | ±% |
|---|---|---|---|---|
| Conservative | Lynne C. Hale | 2,797 | | |
| Conservative | Eric Shaw | 2,740 | | |
| Conservative | Timothy S. Pollard | 2,678 | | |
| Labour | Richard B. Young | 537 | | |
| Liberal Democrats | Michael T.A. Bishopp | 531 | | |
| Labour | Elizabeth M. Wolf | 517 | | |
| Labour | Robert C.E. Brooks | 511 | | |
| Liberal Democrats | Michael K. Frith | 491 | | |
| Liberal Democrats | Geoffrey V. Gauge | 470 | | |
| Majority | | | | |
| Turnout | | | | |
| Conservative hold | | Swing | | |
| Conservative hold | | Swing | | |
| Conservative hold | | Swing | | |

Croydon Council Election 1998: Sanderstead (3)
| Party | Candidate | Votes | % | ±% |
|---|---|---|---|---|
| Conservative | Eric Shaw | 2,183 | | |
| Conservative | Lynne C. Hale | 2,130 | | |
| Labour | Ronald W. Fisher | 628 | | |
| Liberal Democrats | Spencer A. Grady | 470 | | |
| Liberal Democrats | Gavin T. Howard-Jones | 440 | | |
| Labour | Paul J. Smith | 432 | | |
| Independent Resident | Sheila Lee | 41 | | |
| Independent Resident | David Lee | 26 | | |
| Majority | | | | |
| Turnout | | | | |
| Registered electors | | | | |
| Conservative hold | | Swing | | |
| Conservative hold | | Swing | | |

Sanderstead by-election, 14 September 1995
| Party | Candidate | Votes | % | ±% |
|---|---|---|---|---|
| Conservative | Eric Shaw | 1712 | 52.6 | |
| Liberal Democrats | Gavin T. Howard-Jones | 970 | 29.8 | |
| Labour | Michael P. J. Phelan | 528 | 16.2 | |
| Green | Richard J. Hamlyn | 32 | 1.0 | |
| Ind Green Soc Dem | John S. Cartwright | 15 | 0.5 | |
| Majority | | 742 | 22.8 | |
| Turnout | | 3,257 | | |
| Conservative hold | | Swing | | |

The by-election was called following the death of Cllr. Bruce T. H. Marshall.

Croydon Council Election 1994: Sanderstead (3)
| Party | Candidate | Votes | % | ±% |
|---|---|---|---|---|
| Conservative | Bruce T. H. Marshall | 2,083 | | |
| Conservative | Graham T. W. Speed | 2,024 | | |
| Liberal Democrats | Gavin T. Howard-Jones | 1,104 | | |
| Liberal Democrats | Barry D. Stocker | 909 | | |
| Labour | Roger D. Wicks | 636 | | |
| Labour | Jean-Paul Irtelli | 634 | | |
| The People's Choice | Neville Sprague | 125 | | |
| Majority | | 920 | | |
| Turnout | | | | |
| Registered electors | | | | |
| Conservative hold | | Swing | | |
| Conservative hold | | Swing | | |

Croydon Council Election 1990: Sanderstead (3)
| Party | Candidate | Votes | % | ±% |
|---|---|---|---|---|
| Conservative | Bruce T. H. Marshall | 2,534 | | |
| Conservative | Graham T. W. Speed | 2,331 | | |
| Liberal Democrats | Margaret L. Burnett | 703 | | |
| Liberal Democrats | John Hatherley | 634 | | |
| Labour | Robert J. Irwin | 574 | | |
| Labour | Michael P. J. Phelan | 535 | | |
| Majority | | 1,628 | | |
| Turnout | | | | |
| Registered electors | | | | |
| Conservative hold | | Swing | | |
| Conservative hold | | Swing | | |

Croydon Council Election 1986: Sanderstead (3)
| Party | Candidate | Votes | % | ±% |
|---|---|---|---|---|
| Conservative | Colin J. Hood | 2,178 | | |
| Conservative | Bruce T. H. Marshall | 2,042 | | |
| Alliance | Angela C. Mills | 896 | | |
| Alliance | Raymond W. Bustin | 883 | | |
| Labour | Anthony J. Lear | 352 | | |
| Labour | Rose I. White | 294 | | |
| Green | Edmond M. Rosenthal | 149 | | |
| Majority | | 1,146 | | |
| Turnout | | | | |
| Registered electors | | | | |
| Conservative hold | | Swing | | |
| Conservative hold | | Swing | | |

Croydon Council Election 1982: Sanderstead (3)
| Party | Candidate | Votes | % | ±% |
|---|---|---|---|---|
| Conservative | Ronald W. Haskins | 2,649 | | |
| Conservative | David N. Bowen | 2,570 | | |
| Alliance | Raymond W. Bustin | 889 | | |
| Alliance | Eric J. Mann | 853 | | |
| Labour | Keith M. Roberts | 163 | | |
| Labour | Lillian L. Scott | 158 | | |
| Turnout | | | | |
| Conservative hold | | Swing | | |
| Conservative hold | | Swing | | |

Croydon Council Election 1978: Sanderstead (3)
| Party | Candidate | Votes | % | ±% |
|---|---|---|---|---|
| Conservative | David N. Bowen | 2,823 | | |
| Conservative | Ronald W. Haskins | 2,819 | | |
| Liberal | Trevor J. Barker | 352 | | |
| Liberal | June C. Duffelen | 352 | | |
| Labour | Edward L. Hall | 300 | | |
| Labour | Eileen E. Daisley, J.P. | 298 | | |
| Majority | | 2,467 | | |
| Turnout | | | | |
| Registered electors | | | | |
| Conservative win (new seat) | | | | |
| Conservative win (new seat) | | | | |
