= Purley Oaks and Riddlesdown =

Purley Oaks & Riddlesdown
- ward for Croydon Council
- Boundary of Purley Oaks & Riddlesdown in Croydon from 2018.
- County: Greater London

Current ward
- Created: 2018
- Councillor: Alasdair Stewart (Conservative)
- Councillor: Endri Llabuti (Conservative)
- Number of councillors: Two
- Created from: Purley, Waddon and Sanderstead
- UK Parliament constituency: Croydon South

Purley Oaks & Riddlesdown is a ward in the London Borough of Croydon. It was created from parts of the former Purley, Sanderstead and Waddon wards. The first election was on 3 May 2018.

== List of Councillors ==
Election	Councillor	Party	Councillor	Party
2018	Ward created			
2018	Simon Hoar	Conservative	Helen Redfern	Conservative
2022	Alasdair Stewart	Conservative	Endri Llabuti	Conservative

== Mayoral elections ==
Below are the results for the candidate which received the highest share of the popular vote in the ward at each mayoral election.

Year	Mayoralty	Mayoral candidate	Party	Winner?
2021	Mayor of London	Shaun Bailey	Conservative	✗
2022	Mayor of Croydon	Jason Perry	Conservative	✓
2026	Mayor of Croydon	Jason Perry	Conservative	✓

== Ward Results ==
Croydon Council Election 2022: Purley Oaks & Riddlesdown (2)
Party	Candidate	Votes	%	±%
Conservative	Alasdair Stewart	1,635		
Conservative	Endri Llabuti	1,438		
Liberal Democrats	Anne Howard	556		
Liberal Democrats	Chris Jordan	509		
Labour	Karthika Dhamodaran	443		
Labour	Robert Barber	475		
Green	James Harrison	389		
Green	Simon Desorgher	325		
Turnout		3,142	39.41	
Conservative hold		Swing		
Conservative hold		Swing		

Croydon Council Election 2018: Purley Oaks & Riddlesdown (2)
Party	Candidate	Votes	%	±%
Conservative	Simon James Hoar	2,010	31.51	
Conservative	Helen Dawn Redfern	1,927	30.21	
Labour	Gill Millman	804	12.61	
Labour	Khizar Sahi	725	11.37	
Liberal Democrats	Julian Rees	241	3.78	
Green	Simon Desorgher	230	3.61	
Liberal Democrats	Thomas Hesmondhalgh	227	3.56	
Green	Colette Ramuz	214	3.36	
Majority		1,123	17.61	
Turnout				
Conservative hold		Swing		
Conservative hold		Swing		
