= Park Hill and Whitgift =

- ward for Croydon Council
- Boundary of Park Hill and Whitgift in Croydon from 2018.
- County: Greater London

Current ward
- Created: 2018
- Councillor: Andrew Price (Conservative)
- Number of councillors: One
- Created from: Fairfield
- UK Parliament constituency: Croydon South

Park Hill and Whitgift is a ward in the London Borough of Croydon in the United Kingdom, covering the Park Hill and Whitgift estates. It is the only ward in Croydon with one councillor elected every four years. The ward was created following the Croydon Council boundary change in 2018.

As part of the 2023 Boundary Review, Park Hill and Whitgift moved from Croydon Central constituency to Croydon South at the 2024 general election.

== List of Councillors ==
Election	Councillor	Party
2018	Ward created	
2018	Vidhi Mohan	Conservative
2021	Jade Appleton	Conservative
2024	Andrew Price	Conservative

== Mayoral elections ==
Below are the results for the candidate which received the highest share of the popular vote in the ward at each mayoral election.

Year	Mayoralty	Mayoral candidate	Party	Winner?
2021	Mayor of London	Shaun Bailey	Conservative	✗
2022	Mayor of Croydon	Jason Perry	Conservative	✓
2026	Mayor of Croydon	Jason Perry	Conservative	✓

== Croydon council elections ==
=== 2024 by-election ===
The by-election was held on 2 May 2024, following the resignation of Jade Appleton. It took place on the same day as the 2024 London mayoral election, the GLA election and 14 other borough council by-elections across London.

2024 Park Hill and Whitgift by-election
Party	Candidate	Votes	%	±%
Conservative	Andrew Price	960	42.9	▼10.8
Labour	Melanie Felten	701	31.4	▲7.9
Liberal Democrats	Andrew Pelling	295	13.2	▲3.9
Green	James Cork	229	10.2	▼0.4
Independent	Mark Samuel	32	1.4	New
TUSC	Ben Goldstone	19	0.8	New
Majority		259	11.6	▼18.6
Turnout		2,248	51.8	▲9.7
Registered electors		4,336		
Conservative hold		Swing	▼9.4	

=== 2022 election ===
2022 Croydon London Borough Council election: Park Hill and Whitgift (1)
Party	Candidate	Votes	%	±%
Conservative	Jade Appleton*	969	53.7	▲1.2
Labour	Joseph Erber	424	23.5	▼8.5
Green	James Cork	191	10.6	▲1.8
Liberal Democrats	Szymon Zaborski	167	9.2	▲2.4
Taking the Initiative	Caleap Wagner	54	3.0	▲3.0
Turnout		1812	42.07	▼11.23
Conservative hold		Swing	4.85	

=== 2021 by-election ===
The by-election took place on 6 May 2021. It was held on the same day as the 2021 London mayoral election and 2021 London Assembly election.

2021 Park Hill and Whitgift by-election
Party	Candidate	Votes	%	±%
Conservative	Jade Appleton	1,188	52.5	▼3.5
Labour	Chrishni Reshekaron	724	32.0	▲1.0
Green	Catherine Graham	199	8.8	▲2.4
Liberal Democrats	Richard Howard	153	6.8	▲0.1
Majority		464	20.5	▼4.3
Turnout		2295	53.3	▲7.36
Conservative hold		Swing	2.25	

=== 2018 election ===
2018 Croydon London Borough Council election: Park Hill and Whitgift (1)
Party	Candidate	Votes	%	±%
Conservative	Vidhi Mohan*	1,110	55.86	
Labour	Ranil Perera	618	31.10	
Green	James Cork	126	6.34	
Liberal Democrats	Robert George Williams	133	6.69	
Majority		492	24.76	
Turnout		1,991	45.94	N/A
Conservative win (new seat)				
