= Hughes-Hallett =

Hughes-Hallett may refer to several people with the surname:

- Charles Hughes-Hallett (1898-1985), British Royal Navy officer
- Deborah Hughes Hallett, British mathematics education reformer
- Francis Hughes-Hallett (1838–1903), British politician
- Grace Hughes-Hallett, British documentary filmmaker
- James Hughes-Hallett (1949-2019), British businessman and investor
- John Hughes-Hallett (1901-1972), British politician
- Kathleen Hughes-Hallett (1918-2002), Canadian fencer
- Lucy Hughes-Hallett (born 1951), British cultural historian and biographer
- Norton Hughes-Hallett (1895–1985), British army officer and cricket player
- Sir Thomas Hughes-Hallett (born 1954), British barrister, investment banker and philanthropy executive
