= Henry Marten (regicide) =

English politician and regicide

Henry Marten MP JP
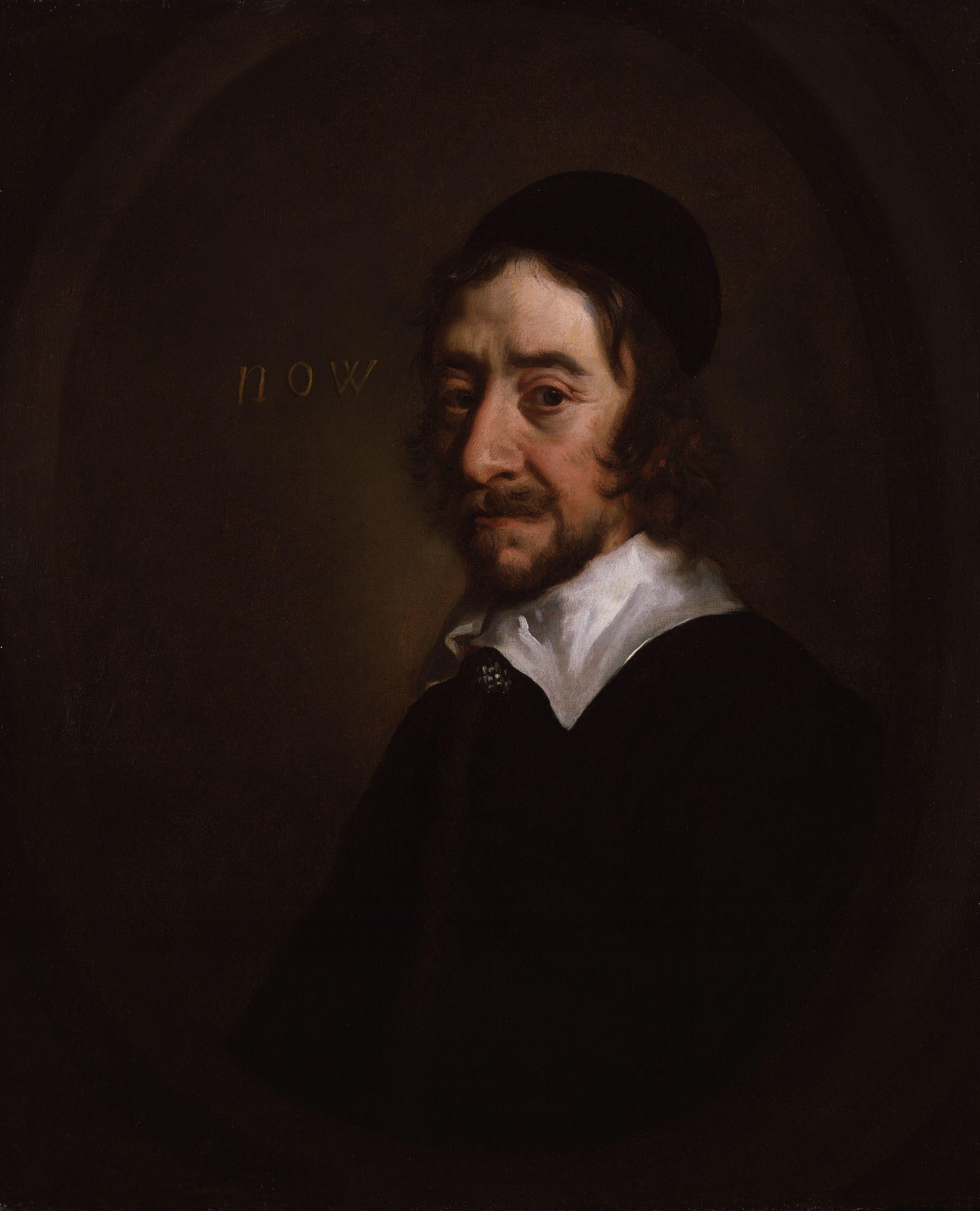
- Henry Marten by Peter Lely, c. 1640

Member of Parliament for Berkshire
- In office March 1640 – April 1640
- In office November 1640 – September 1653

Governor Reading, Berkshire
- In office 1642–1643

Governor Aylesbury
- In office 1644–1646

Personal details
- Born: 20 May 1602 Oxford, Oxfordshire
- Died: 9 September 1680 (aged 78) Chepstow Castle, Monmouthshire
- Resting place: Priory Church of St Mary, Chepstow
- Spouse(s): Elizabeth Lovelace (1617-1634); Margaret Staunton (1635-1679); Mary Ward (1642-1680)
- Parent: Sir Henry Marten
- Education: University College, Oxford
- Occupation: Lawyer and politician

Henry Marten (1602 – 9 September 1680) was a Member of Parliament from Oxford, who sat in the English House of Commons at various times between 1640 and 1653. An ardent republican, he was jailed by Parliament during the First English Civil War in 1643 for demanding the abolition of the monarchy. He approved the execution of Charles I in January 1649 and was found guilty of regicide following the 1660 Stuart Restoration.

Spared execution thanks to his Royalist friends, he was held in captivity until his death at Chepstow Castle in 1680.

== Personal details ==
Henry Marten was born in Oxford in 1602, eldest son of lawyer and diplomat Sir Henry Marten (1561-1641), and his wife Elizabeth (1574-1618). He had a younger brother, George, and three sisters, Elizabeth, Jane, and Mary.

In 1627, Marten married Elizabeth, sister of John Lovelace, 2nd Baron Lovelace, and they had three daughters before her death in 1634, Margaret, Elizabeth, and Mary (1634-1700). He had another five children with his second wife Margaret Staunton, Anne, Jane, Henry (1639-?), Frances, and Rebecca (1642-1693). Shortly after the outbreak of the First English Civil War in August 1642, Marten allegedly abandoned his wife in Berkshire and thereafter lived in London with his partner, Mary Ward.

== Career ==
As a public figure, Marten first came to prominence in 1639 when he refused to contribute to a general loan. In April 1640, he was elected Member of Parliament for Berkshire in the Short Parliament. He was re-elected MP for Berkshire for the Long Parliament in November 1640. He lived at Beckett Hall in Shrivenham (now in Oxfordshire) and soon afterwards, his official residence became Longworth House in nearby Longworth. He preferred to live in London. In the House of Commons, he joined the popular party, spoke in favour of the proposed bill of attainder against Strafford, and in 1642 was a member of the committee of safety. Some of his language about the king was so frank that Charles demanded his arrest and his trial for high treason.

When the English Civil War broke out Marten did not take the field, although he was appointed governor of Reading, Berkshire, but in Parliament he was very active. On one occasion his zeal in the parliamentary cause led him to open a letter from the Earl of Northumberland to his countess, an impertinence for which, says Clarendon, he was cudgelled by the Earl.

In 1643 he was expelled from the Houses of Parliament and briefly imprisoned in the Tower of London for expressing the view that the royal family should be extirpated and monarchy brought to an end.

In 1644, however, he was made governor of Aylesbury, and about this time took direct part in the war. Allowed to return to Parliament in January 1646, Marten again advocated extreme republican views. He spoke of his desire to prepare the king for heaven; he attacked the Presbyterians, and, supporting the New Model Army against the Long Parliament, he signed the agreement of August 1647. He was closely associated with John Lilburne and the Levellers, and was one of those who suspected the sincerity of Oliver Cromwell, whose murder he is said personally to have contemplated.

However, he acted with Cromwell in bringing Charles I to trial; he was one of the most prominent of the 31 of 59 Commissioners to sign the death warrant in 1649. He was then energetic in establishing the Commonwealth and in destroying the remaining vestiges of the monarchical system. He was chosen a member of the Council of State in 1649, and as compensation for his losses and reward for his services during the war, lands valued at £1000 a year were settled upon him. In parliament he spoke often and with effect, but he took no part in public life during the Protectorate, passing part of this time in prison, where he was placed on account of his debts.

Having sat among the restored members of the Long Parliament in 1659, Marten surrendered himself to the authorities as a regicide in June 1660, and with some others he was excepted from the Indemnity and Oblivion Act, but with a saving clause. He behaved courageously at his trial, which took place in October 1660, but he was found guilty of taking part in the king's death. Through the action, or rather the inaction of the House of Lords, he was spared the death penalty, but he remained a captive.

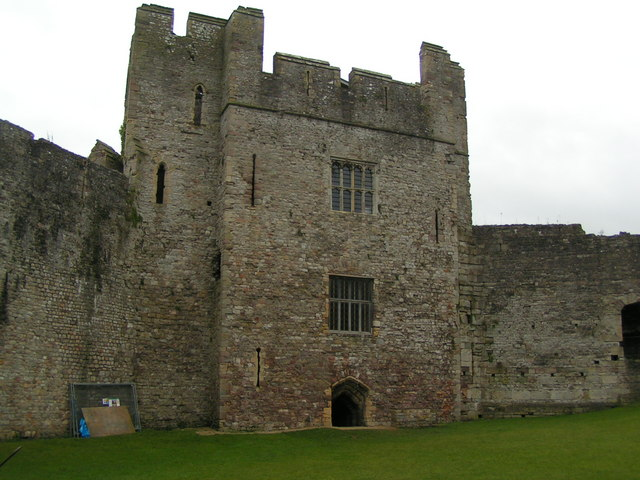
Marten's Tower, his apartments within Chepstow Castle

Having escaped the death penalty for his involvement in the regicide Marten was sent into internal exile, first in the far north of England and then (1665) to Windsor Castle, where he remained until Charles II ordered him to be moved further away from himself. In 1668 Marten was sent to Chepstow, in Wales. Marten's imprisonment there lasted some twelve years but does not appear to have been unduly arduous, at least at first; he had a suite of rooms in what was then known as Bigod's Tower (now known as Marten's Tower) and seems to have been able to travel outside at times. His legitimate wife Margaret lived apart from him, remaining at the family home in Berkshire, but he was attended there by Mary Ward, his common-law wife. Marten died at Chepstow Castle on 9 September 1680, having choked while eating his supper, and was buried beneath the floor at an entryway of Priory and Parish Church of St Mary, Chepstow, Monmouthshire, Wales, UK.

== Character and beliefs ==
Although a leading Puritan, Marten enjoyed good living. He had a contemporary reputation as a heavy drinker and was widely said to be a man of loose morals. According to John Aubrey he was "a great lover of pretty girls to whom he was so liberal that he spent the greatest part of his estate" upon them. In the opinion of King Charles I he was "an ugly rascal and whore-master". He married twice (to Elizabeth Lovelace, daughter of Richard Lovelace, 1st Baron Lovelace; and to Margaret Staunton, née West) but had an open and lengthy relationship with Mary Ward, a woman not his wife, by whom he had three daughters. Ward ultimately was to remain with him throughout his later imprisonment. His enemies branded him an atheist but his religious views were more complex, and influenced his position regarding the need to allow freedom of worship and conscience. His political views throughout his life were constant: he opposed one-man rule and was in favour of representative government. In 1643, even while the king was losing the First Civil War and Parliament's cause was beginning to triumph, Marten's republican sentiments led to his arrest and brief imprisonment. Thus for his time Marten was unusual in his political stance, being unashamedly in favour not of reforming the monarchy but of replacing it with a republic.

== Works ==
Marten was not a copious author, often beginning works and not carrying them through to completion. Nevertheless, he wrote and published several pamphlets, all on political topics:

- A Corrector of the Answerer to the Speech out of Doores (1646)
- An Unhappie Game at Scotch and English (1646)
- The Independency of England Endeavoured to be Maintained (1648)
- The Parliaments Proceedings Justified in Declining a Personall Treaty (1648)

In 1662 there appeared Henry Marten's Familiar Letters to his Lady of Delight, containing letters Marten had written to his common-law wife, Mary Ward, which had been seized and published without permission.

== Sources ==
- Barber, Sarah (2008). "Marten [Martin], Henry [Harry](1601/2–1680". Oxford Dictionary of National Biography (online ed.). Oxford University Press. doi:10.1093/ref:odnb/18168. (Subscription, Wikipedia Library access or UK public library membership required.)
- Gardiner, S.R. (1886). History of the Great Civil War, Volume One 1642–44. London: Longmans Green. p. 238.
- Hibbert, Christopher (1993). Roundheads and Cavaliers: the English at War 1642–1649. London: Harper Collins. p. 124.
- Stroud, Angus (2002). Stuart England (illustrated ed.). Routledge. p. 90. ISBN 9780203067017.
- Willis, Browne (1750). Notitia Parliamentaria, Part II: A Series or Lists of the Representatives in the several Parliaments held from the Reformation 1541, to the Restoration 1660 ... London. pp. 229–239.

Parliament of England
Vacant Parliament suspended since 1629	Member of Parliament for Berkshire; 1640–1643; With: John Fettiplace	Constituency unrepresented
Constituency unrepresented	Member of Parliament for Berkshire; 1646–1653; With: Sir Francis Pile, 2nd Baronet 1646–1648; Philip Earl of Pembroke 1649–1650; Henry Neville 1650–1653	Succeeded by Samuel Dunch; Vincent Goddard; Thomas Wood
