= Croydon East =

Croydon East may refer to:

- East Croydon station, a rail and tram station in Croydon, London, England
- Croydon East (UK Parliament constituency), a constituency in Croydon
