= Longworth =

Village in Oxfordshire, England

Coordinates: 51.697019°N 1.4376°W

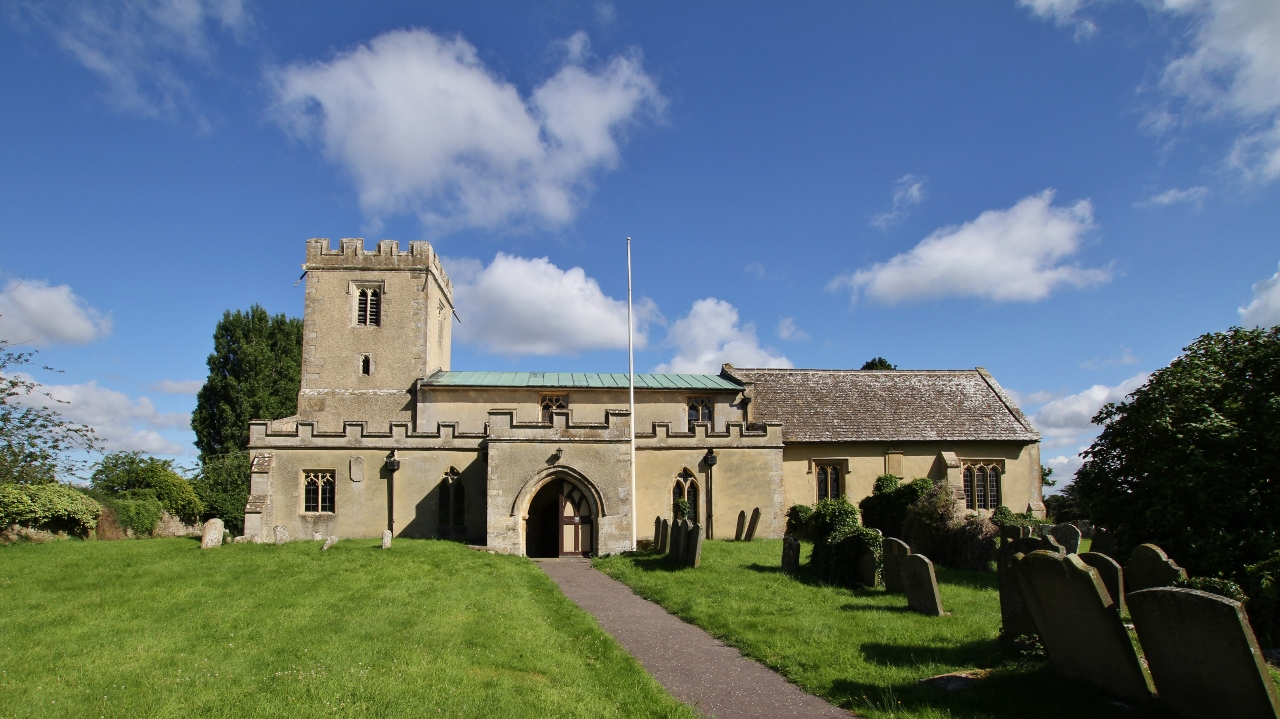
- St Mary's parish church

- Location within Oxfordshire
- Population: 543 (2021 Census)
- OS grid reference: SU3999
- Civil parish: Longworth
- District: Vale of White Horse
- Shire county: Oxfordshire
- Region: South East
- Country: England
- Sovereign state: United Kingdom
- Post town: Abingdon
- Postcode district: OX13
- Dialling code: 01865
- Police: Thames Valley
- Fire: Oxfordshire
- Ambulance: South Central
- UK Parliament: Witney
- Website: Longworth Village on the Web

Longworth is a village and civil parish in the Vale of White Horse, England. Historically within the north-west projection of Berkshire, boundary changes transferred it to Oxfordshire in 1974. The village is between Faringdon, 7 miles (11 km) to the west, and Oxford, 9 miles (14 km) to the northeast. The 2021 Census recorded the parish's population as 543.

The parish is bounded by the River Thames to the north, the A420 road to the south, and field boundaries to the east and west. The land slopes from the A420 road to the river, except at Harrowdown Hill near the northeast corner of the parish, which has a summit of 325 feet (99 m).

== Parish church ==
The oldest parts of the Anglican St Mary's Church, Longworth are 13th-century. The current chancel, west tower and north aisle are 15th-century. The chancel has a reredos by the Arts and Crafts movement painters and sisters, Kate and Myra Bunce. It is a Grade I listed building.

The parish is in the benefice of Cherbury with Gainfield. J. R. Illingworth, a theologian and philosopher, was Rector of St Mary's from 1883 to 1915.

Longworth had a Congregational chapel, built in 1848, and a Primitive Methodist chapel, built in 1861. Both chapels have now been converted into private homes.

== Manor house ==
Longworth's original manor house is early 17th-century. It was built for a judge, Sir Henry Marten, about a mile south of the village on the edge of the Vale of White Horse. It was later the home of his son, Henry Marten, the regicide and republican. In the 20th century, it was home to Sir Clarendon Hyde, a Liberal MP and businessman.

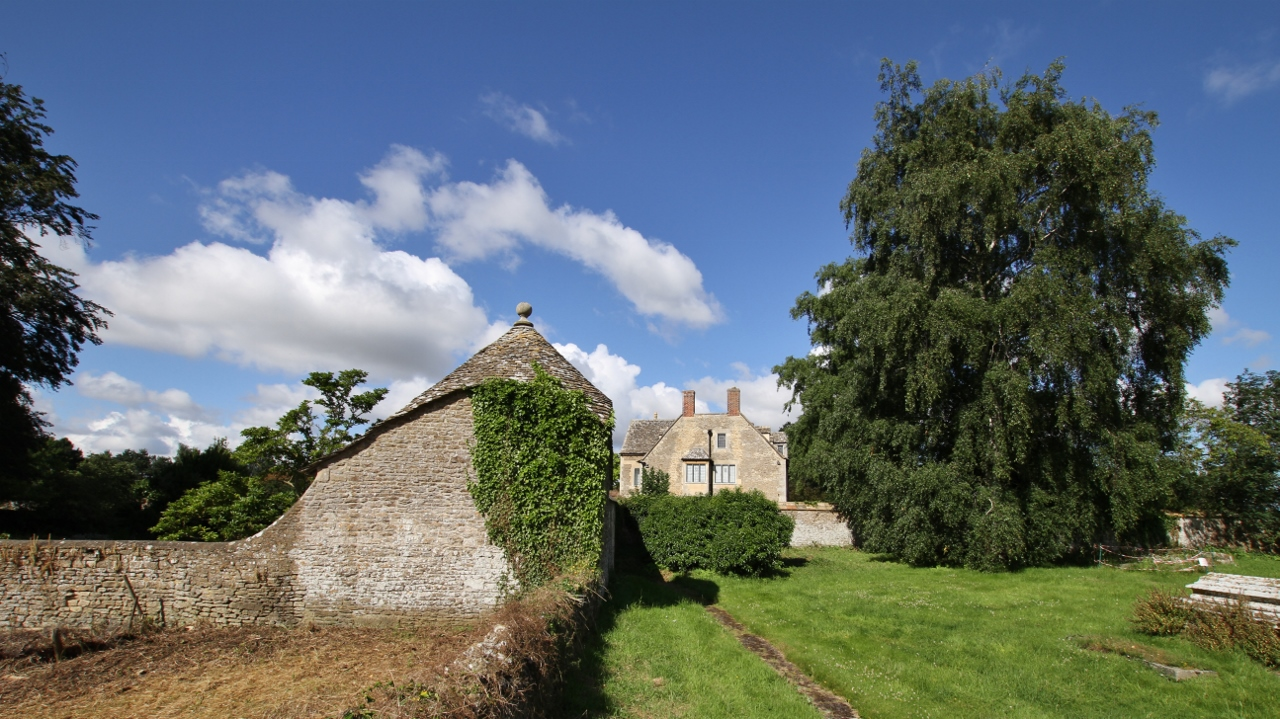
Stone gazebo in the garden of Longworth Manor (centre left), with the manor house in the background (centre right)

The current manor house, Longworth House, was originally called Manor Farm. It is just west of the parish church. It was built in the late 17th century, and remodelled and extended in the early 20th century. It is a Grade II listed building. It was home to Colonel Granville Walton, a leading Scout.

== Economic and social history ==
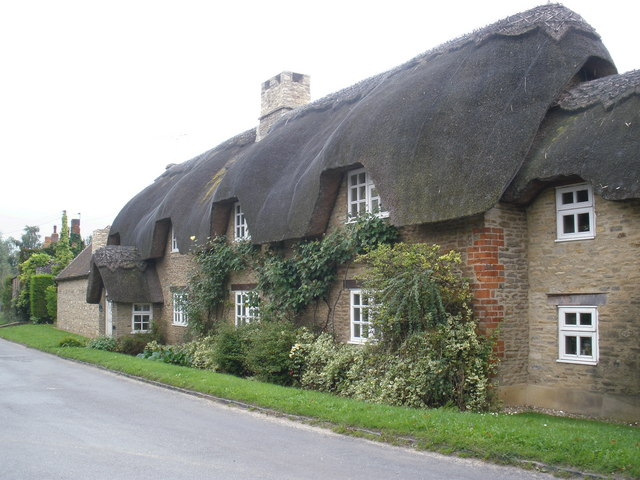
Squirrel Cottage on Hinton Road, south of the village

John Fell (1625–86), an English churchman and influential academic, was born in Longworth; he was Dean of Christ Church, Oxford and later concomitantly Bishop of Oxford.

A farmstead about a quarter of a mile (1.2 km) south of the village has a 17th-century tithe barn, with a queen post roof seven bays long. It is a Grade II* listed building. and a scheduled monument.

The novelist R. D. Blackmore, author of Lorna Doone, was born at the Old Rectory in 1825. His father was briefly curate-in-charge of the parish.

Harrowdown Hill is where biological warfare expert David Kelly died in 2003 during the Iraqi weapons of mass destruction controversy. This gave rise to a public enquiry that concluded with the Hutton Report. A song by Thom Yorke called Harrowdown Hill questioned the Government's handling of the matter.

== Amenities ==
Longworth has a non-denominational county primary school.

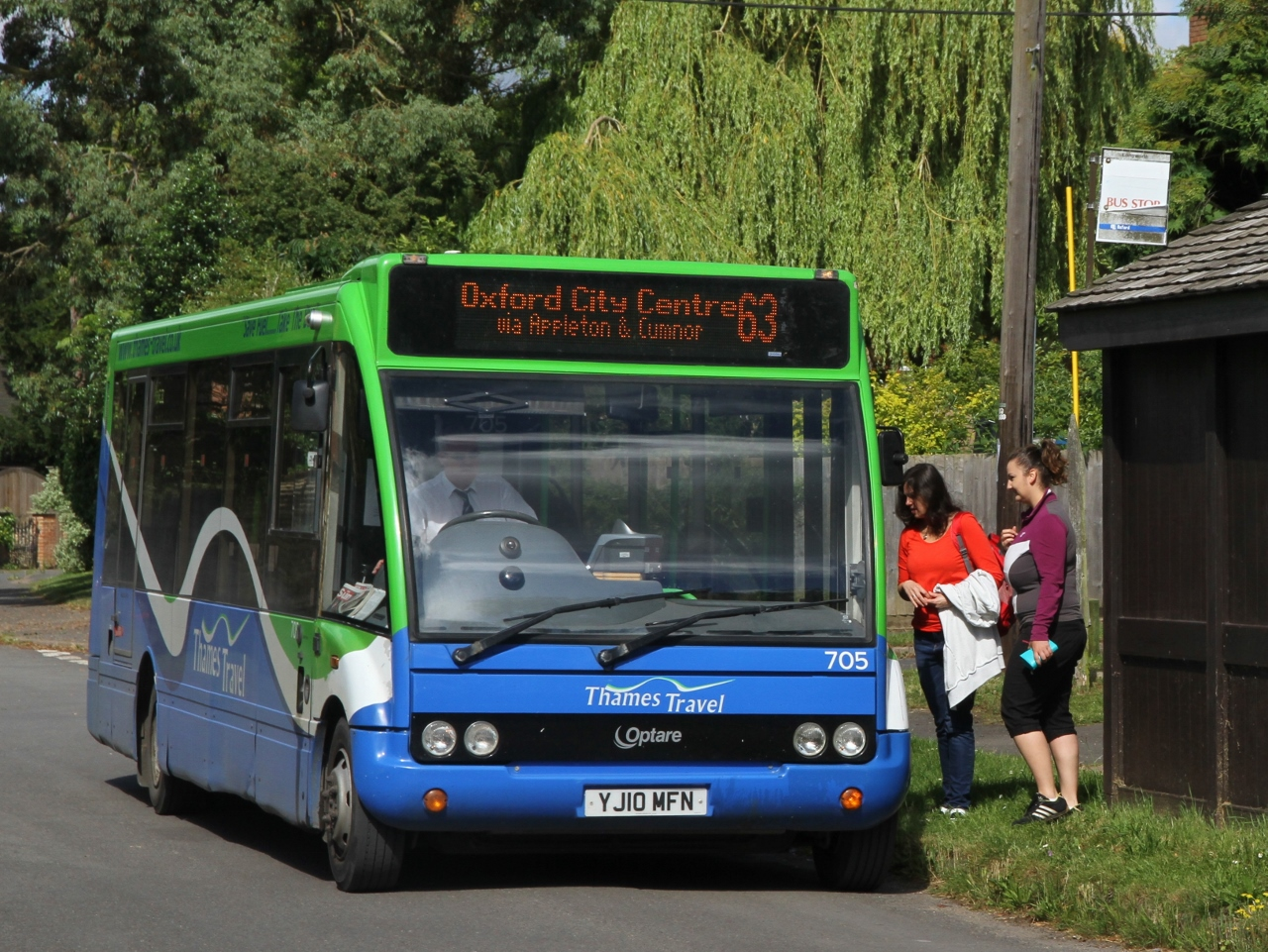
A Thames Travel bus in Longworth

Oxfordshire County Council subsidised bus route 63 between Oxford and Southmoor serves Longworth on weekdays. From Monday to Friday there are five departures a day from Longworth to Oxford, and four buses a day from Oxford to Longworth. There is no service on Saturday, Sunday, or Bank Holidays. The current contractor operating the route is Thames Travel.

=== Public houses ===
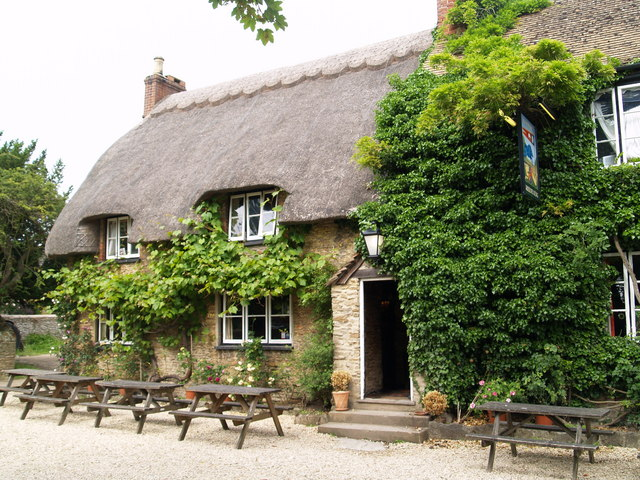
The Blue Boar public house

There is a pub in the village, the Blue Boar, which was built in 1606 and has a thatched roof.

The Lamb and Flag, about 1¼ miles (2 km) southwest of the village, was in the parish until boundary changes in 2011 transferred it to Kingston Bagpuize with Southmoor. It is now a private house. These changes brought the Maybush Inn at Newbridge into the parish.

The white boar and the white rose on the Blue Boar pub sign are symbols of King Richard III. The blue boar was the personal badge of the De Vere family as Earls of Oxford. It is claimed that when Richard was killed at the Battle of Bosworth in 1485, any White Boar pub signs were quickly repainted as Blue Boar, to signify that the white boar was dead and blue had prevailed.

== Blue Boar RFC ==
Blue Boar Rugby Football Club, based at the Blue Boar pub, normally plays home games at the Oxford R.F.C. ground. It played its first rugby game in March 1977, after a challenge by staff of Blackwells Bookshop in Oxford.

In the following season, several more matches were arranged against local sides and the club affiliated to the Oxfordshire Rugby Football Union. The number and quality of its fixtures increased and in May 1981 the club was elected to the Rugby Football Union. In September 1980 it made a first tour of Cornwall, followed by further visits in 1987, 1988 and 1989. Its first foreign tour in 1981 took 35 players and supporters to Brittany. The team returned there a year later. In 1991 the club was the first English RFU club to make an official tour of Hungary, hosted by the Hungarian Rugby Union. The club reached the final of the Oxfordshire Knockout Cup Plate competition in the 2003–04 and 2008–09 seasons.

== Sources and further reading ==
- Page, WH; Ditchfield, PH, eds. (1924). A History of the County of Berkshire. Victoria County History. Vol. 4. assisted by John Hautenville Cope. London: The St Katherine Press. pp. 466–471.
- Pevsner, Nikolaus (1966). Berkshire. The Buildings of England. Harmondsworth: Penguin Books. pp. 171–172.
- Winn, Christopher (2010). I Never Knew That about the River Thames. London: Ebury Press. p. 45.
