= Henry Marten (politician) =

English judge and politician

Sir Henry Marten, also recorded as Sir Henry Martin, (1562 – 26 September 1641) was an English judge and politician who sat in the House of Commons at various times between 1625 and 1640. He served as Judge of the High Court of Admiralty from 1617 to 1641.

== Life ==
There are two main conflicting accounts of Marten's early life.

The Oxford Dictionary of National Biography identifies him as the eldest son of Anthony Marten, a merchant of London, originally from Wokingham, Berkshire, and his wife Margaret, daughter of John Yate of Lydford, Berkshire. It quotes John Aubrey, writing in 1680 (Brief Lives, 1.43), as giving Marten's birthplace as Stoke Poges, Buckinghamshire. Anthony à Wood in Athenae Oxienses, compiled between 1660 and 1669, also identifies Anthony Marten and Margaret as his parents, noting that Margaret was his second wife.

The History of Parliament identifies him as the second son of John Marten (d.1563), a wealthy London baker, and his wife Rose. It describes the identification with the merchant Anthony as "unlikely", as Henry Marten is known to have had an older brother, but suggests (in contrast to the Oxford Dictionary of National Biography) that Anthony Marten appears to have had only one son. It gives the date of Marten's baptism as 2 Aug 1562; John Marten died in October 1563. Further confusion is sown by an anonymous writer in the Gentleman's Magazine for 1830, who refers to Anthony Marten's wife as Anne Jacob.

Marten was educated at Winchester College and matriculated at New College, Oxford on 24 November 1581, aged 19. He became a fellow of the college in 1582 and studied civil and canon law. He graduated BCL in 1587 and DCL in 1592, and was admitted a member of the College of Advocates on 16 October 1596. He developed a large practice as a barrister in the admiralty, prerogative, and high commission courts, and was appointed official of the archdeaconry of Berkshire.

Marten was made King's advocate on 3 March 1609 and in March 1613 was sent abroad in connection with the marriage settlement of the Lady Elizabeth. In 1616, he was made chancellor of the diocese of London. He was knighted at Theobalds on 21 December 1616. and in 1617 became a judge of the admiralty court. Later he was appointed a member of the court of high commission and dean of the arches. Marten started investing in land in Berkshire buying firstly property at West Challow in the Vale of White Horse, secondly Longworth House at Longworth which he bought for £9,500 in 1618, and thirdly Hinton Waldrist Manor.

In 1625 Marten was elected Member of Parliament for St Germans and supported Sir John Eliot in attacking the Duke of Buckingham. His tone was described as studiously moderate. While parliament was prorogued in 1626, he was involved in the committal of Sir Robert Howard by the high commission, and when he was re-elected MP for St Germans in 1626, an attempt was made to exclude him because of the case. He pleaded ignorance of the distinction between prorogation and dissolution and was allowed to take his seat. In 1628 he was elected MP for Oxford University, taking part in the debates on the Petition of Right and sitting until 1629 when King Charles I decided to rule without parliament for eleven years.

In April 1640, Marten was elected MP for St Ives in the Short Parliament. He did not stand for the Long Parliament which fined him £250 for his part in the case of Sir Robert Howard.

Marten married Elizabeth Harding, the sister of John Harding, and had two sons and three daughters. He was father of the regicide Henry Marten. Sir Henry Marten second son George Giles Martin, was a loyalist as well. George was Lord Mayor of Belfast, Ireland, until disposed of home and employment by Oliver Cromwell. George Giles Martin became a tobacco producer and was the Speaker of the House of the Assembly of Barbados in 1665. Sir Henry Marten died on 26 September 1641 at Bray, Berkshire, England and was buried at Saint Mary's Church, at Longworth, Oxfordshire, England with his wife Elizabeth, who had died in 1618.

A portrait of Sir Henry Martin hangs in Trinity Hall, Cambridge. (Note: The portrait is captioned "Sir Henry Martin (c.1562–1641), DCL, Fellow of New College, Oxford, Judge of Admiralty Court (1617–1641) by British (English) School. Date painted: c.1630 Oil on panel, 66.04 x 50.8 cm. Collection: Trinity Hall, University of Cambridge")

== Notes ==
Parliament of England
Preceded by (Sir) John Coke; Sir John Stradling	Member of Parliament for St Germans; 1625–1626; With: (Sir) John Coke 1625; Sir John Eliot	Succeeded by Thomas Cotton; Benjamin Valentine
Preceded by Sir Thomas Edmonds; Sir John Danvers	Member of Parliament for Oxford University; 1628–1629; With: Sir John Danvers	Parliament suspended until 1640
Vacant Parliament suspended since 1629	Member of Parliament for St Ives; 1640; With: William Dell	Succeeded by Lord Lisle; Francis Godolphin
