= Croydon North East =

Parliamentary constituency in the United Kingdom, 1955–1997

- Former borough constituency for the House of Commons
- Boundary of Croydon North East in for the 1983 general election
- County: 1955–1965: Surrey; 1965–1997: Greater London

1955–1997
- Seats: One
- Created from: Croydon East and Croydon North
- Replaced by: Croydon Central and Croydon North

Croydon North East was a borough constituency represented in the House of Commons of the Parliament of the United Kingdom from 1955 to 1997. It elected one Member of Parliament (MP) by the first past the post system of election.

== History ==
Croydon North East was created for the 1955 general election just five years after a previous re-organisation of the three seats in the County Borough of Croydon. It took in areas of the former Croydon North and Croydon East constituencies and bordered Croydon North West and Croydon South, as well as, when originally created, the constituency of Beckenham.

The constituency was abolished at the 1997 general election with one third going to the new Croydon North seat (the Thornton Heath, Upper Norwood and South Norwood wards) and the rest (the wards of Woodside, Rylands, Addiscombe, Ashburton and Monks Orchard) becoming part of an expanded Croydon Central.

For all of its history, Croydon North East had Conservative Members of Parliament, although in 1987 its long-serving and most notable MP, Bernard Weatherill, stood as Speaker. Following its abolition at the 1997 election both successor seats elected Labour MPs.

== Boundaries ==
Dates	Local authority	Maps	Wards
1955–1974	County Borough of Croydon		Addiscombe, East, South Norwood, Thornton Heath, and Woodside.
1974–1983	London Borough of Croydon		Addiscombe, East, South Norwood, Thornton Heath, and Woodside.
1983–1997	London Borough of Croydon		Addiscombe, Ashburton, Monks Orchard, Rylands, South Norwood, Thornton Heath, Upper Norwood, and Woodside.

When first created, Croydon North East included the areas of South Norwood and Addiscombe and parts of Thornton Heath and Shirley. It saw various boundary changes, largely stretching further north. At the time of its abolition in 1997, Croydon North East covered all of South Norwood, Upper Norwood, Addiscombe, northern Shirley and parts of Thornton Heath around Thornton Heath High Street, within the London Borough of Croydon.

== Members of Parliament ==
Election	Member	Party	Notes
1955	John Hughes-Hallett	Conservative	Member for main predecessor seat (1954–1955)
1964	Bernard Weatherill	Conservative	Chairman of Ways and Means 1979–1983
1983	Bernard Weatherill	Speaker	Speaker of the House of Commons 1983–1992
1992	David Congdon	Conservative	Contested Croydon Central following redistribution
1997	constituency abolished: see Croydon Central & Croydon North		

== Elections ==
=== Elections in the 1950s ===
General election 1955: Croydon North East
Party	Candidate	Votes	%
Conservative	John Hughes-Hallett	25,097	55.0
Labour	Gordon Borrie	16,616	36.4
Liberal	James Walters	3,892	8.6
Majority		8,481	18.6
Turnout		45,605	77.7
Registered electors		58,663	
Conservative win (new seat)			

General election 1959: Croydon North East
Party	Candidate	Votes	%	±%
Conservative	John Hughes-Hallett	24,345	53.0	–2.0
Labour	Walter Wolfgang	15,440	33.6	–2.8
Liberal	Arnold Bender	6,109	13.3	+4.8
Majority		8,905	19.4	+0.8
Turnout		45,894	80.3	+2.5
Registered electors		57,174		
Conservative hold		Swing	+0.4	

=== Elections in the 1960s ===
General election 1964: Croydon North East
Party	Candidate	Votes	%	±%
Conservative	Bernard Weatherill	19,930	46.8	–6.3
Labour	D. Storer	16,099	37.8	+4.2
Liberal	Stuart de la Mahotiere	6,567	15.4	+2.1
Majority		3,831	9.0	–10.4
Turnout		42,596	75.0	–5.3
Registered electors		56,765		
Conservative hold		Swing	–5.2	

General election 1966: Croydon North East
Party	Candidate	Votes	%	±%
Conservative	Bernard Weatherill	18,302	43.6	–3.2
Labour	Gerald Elliot	17,714	42.2	+4.4
Liberal	Johndon Henchley	6,007	14.3	–1.1
Majority		588	1.4	–7.6
Turnout		42,023	76.3	+1.2
Registered electors		55,094		
Conservative hold		Swing	–3.8	

=== Elections in the 1970s ===
General election 1970: Croydon North East
Party	Candidate	Votes	%	±%
Conservative	Bernard Weatherill	20,351	49.7	+6.2
Labour	Gerald Elliot	16,373	40.0	–2.3
Liberal	Roger Mayhew	4,210	10.3	–4.0
Majority		3,978	9.7	+8.3
Turnout		40,934	69.6	–6.7
Registered electors		58,819		
Conservative hold		Swing	+4.2	

1970 notional result
Party	Vote	%
Conservative	20,500	50.2
Labour	16,100	39.5
Liberal	4,200	10.3
Turnout	40,800	71.3
Electorate	57,228	

General election February 1974: Croydon North East
Party	Candidate	Votes	%	±%
Conservative	Bernard Weatherill	19,395	42.5	–7.7
Labour	C. R. Coyne	15,575	34.1	–5.3
Liberal	Patrick Streeter	10,659	23.4	+13.1
Majority		3,820	8.4	–2.4
Turnout		45,629	78.7	+7.4
Registered electors		57,951		
Conservative hold		Swing	–1.2	

General election October 1974: Croydon North East
Party	Candidate	Votes	%	±%
Conservative	Bernard Weatherill	17,938	43.3	+0.8
Labour	David Simpson	15,787	38.1	+4.0
Liberal	Patrick Streeter	7,228	17.5	–5.9
Independent British Nationalist	William Stringer	451	1.1	New
Majority		2,151	5.2	–3.2
Turnout		41,404	71.0	–7.7
Registered electors		58,306		
Conservative hold		Swing	–1.6	

General election 1979: Croydon North East
Party	Candidate	Votes	%	±%
Conservative	Bernard Weatherill	21,560	51.0	+7.7
Labour	David Simpson	14,784	35.0	–3.2
Liberal	Patrick Streeter	5,459	12.9	–4.5
National Front	Peter Moss	464	1.1	New
Majority		6,776	16.0	+10.8
Turnout		42,267	74.1	+3.1
Registered electors		57,022		
Conservative hold		Swing	+5.4	

1979 notional result
Party	Vote	%
Conservative	24,253	51.3
Labour	16,454	34.8
Liberal	6,064	12.8
Others	464	1.0
Turnout	47,235	
Electorate		

=== Elections in the 1980s ===
General election 1983: Croydon North East
Party	Candidate	Votes	%	±%
Conservative	Bernard Weatherill	22,292	52.5	+1.2
SDP	Julian Goldie	10,665	25.1	+12.3
Labour	Kathryn Riley	9,503	22.4	–12.5
Majority		11,637	27.4	+10.9
Turnout		38,460	67.5	–6.6
Registered electors		62,923		
Conservative hold		Swing	–5.6	

General election 1987: Croydon North East
Party	Candidate	Votes	%	±%
Speaker	Bernard Weatherill	24,188	55.0	+2.5
Labour	Christine Patrick	11,669	26.5	+4.1
SDP	Julian Goldie	8,128	18.5	–6.6
Majority		12,519	28.5	+1.1
Turnout		43,985	69.7	+2.2
Registered electors		63,129		
Speaker hold		Swing	–0.8	

=== Elections in the 1990s ===
General election 1992: Croydon North East
Party	Candidate	Votes	%	±%
Conservative	David Congdon	23,835	51.4	–3.6
Labour	Mary Walker	16,362	35.3	+8.7
Liberal Democrats	John Fraser	6,186	13.3	–5.1
Majority		7,473	16.1	–12.4
Turnout		46,383	72.0	+2.3
Registered electors		64,405		
Conservative gain from Speaker		Swing	–6.2	

== See also ==
- Parliamentary constituencies in London

== Sources ==
- The Times House of Commons 1955. 1955.

Parliament of the United Kingdom
Preceded by Cardiff West	Constituency represented by the speaker 1983 – 1992	Succeeded by West Bromwich West
