= Bernard Weatherill =

British politician (1920–2007)

The Right Honourable The Lord Weatherill KStJ PC DL

Speaker of the House of Commons of the United Kingdom
- In office 16 June 1983 – 27 April 1992
- Monarch: Elizabeth II
- Prime Minister: Margaret Thatcher; John Major
- Preceded by: George Thomas
- Succeeded by: Betty Boothroyd

Deputy Speaker of the House of Commons Chairman of Ways and Means
- In office 10 May 1979 – 11 June 1983
- Speaker: George Thomas
- Preceded by: Oscar Murton
- Succeeded by: Harold Walker

Opposition Deputy Chief Whip of the House of Commons
- In office 4 March 1974 – 4 May 1979
- Leader: Edward Heath; Margaret Thatcher
- Preceded by: Walter Harrison
- Succeeded by: Walter Harrison

Deputy Chief Whip Treasurer of the Household
- In office 2 December 1973 – 4 March 1974
- Prime Minister: Edward Heath
- Preceded by: Humphrey Atkins
- Succeeded by: Walter Harrison

Comptroller of the Household
- In office 7 April 1972 – 2 December 1973
- Prime Minister: Edward Heath
- Preceded by: Reginald Eyre
- Succeeded by: Walter Clegg

Vice-Chamberlain of the Household
- In office 17 October 1971 – 7 April 1972
- Prime Minister: Edward Heath
- Preceded by: Jasper More
- Succeeded by: Walter Clegg

Member of the House of Lords
- Lord Temporal
- Life peerage 15 July 1992 – 6 May 2007

Member of Parliament for Croydon North East
- In office 15 October 1964 – 16 March 1992
- Preceded by: John Hughes-Hallett
- Succeeded by: David Congdon

Personal details
- Born: Bruce Bernard Weatherill; 25 November 1920 Sunningdale, Berkshire, England
- Died: 6 May 2007 (aged 86) Caterham, Surrey, England
- Party: Conservative (until 1983)
- Other political affiliations: Crossbencher (1992–2007); Speaker (1983–1992)
- Spouse: Lyn Eatwell (m. 1949)
- Relations: Alan Lovell (son-in-law)
- Children: 3
- Education: Malvern College

Military service
- Allegiance: United Kingdom
- Branch/service: British Army
- Years of service: 1939–1946
- Rank: Captain
- Unit: 4th/7th Royal Dragoon Guards

Bruce Bernard Weatherill, Baron Weatherill, (25 November 1920 – 6 May 2007) was a British Conservative Party politician. He served as Speaker of the House of Commons between 1983 and 1992.

== Background ==
Born in Sunningdale in 1920, he was the son of Annie Gertrude (née Creak) and Bernard Bruce Weatherill. He married Lyn Eatwell in 1949 and they had three children. Weatherill was known as "Jack", while his twin sister (baptismal name Margery) was called "Jill".

== Tailor ==
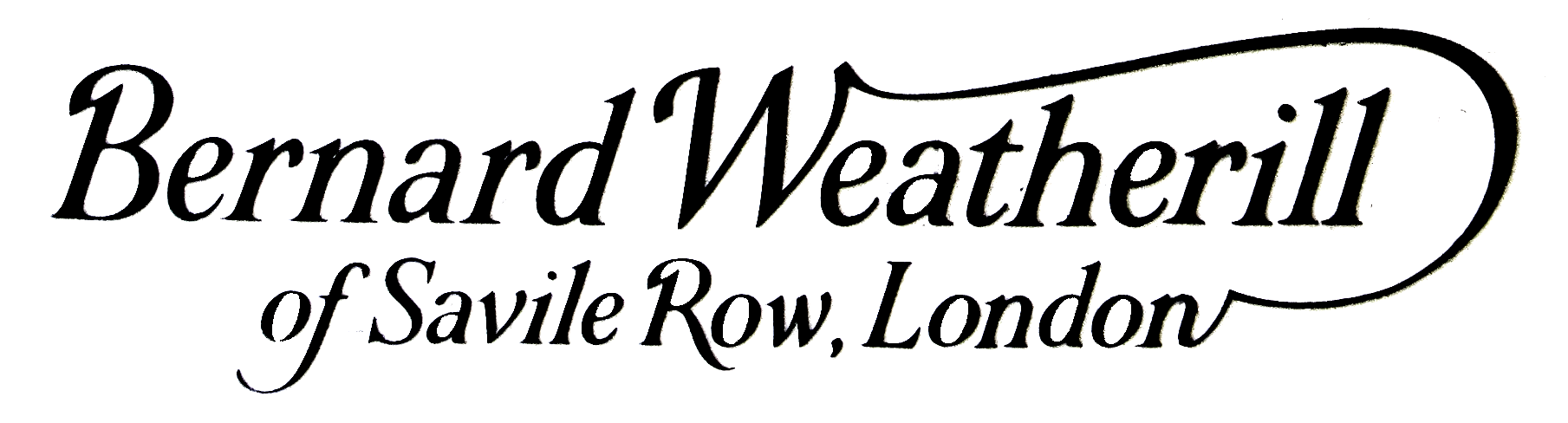
Company logo of Bernard Weatherill Ltd

After attending Malvern College, he was apprenticed at age 17 as a tailor to the family firm Bernard Weatherill Ltd, Sporting Tailors, later of 5 Savile Row. He became Director (1948), Managing Director (1958), and Chairman (1967) of the business. After it merged with Kilgour French & Stanbury Ltd., Tailors in 1969, he became Chairman of the combined firm. He resumed his role with the company after his retirement from the House of Commons in 1992, as president until the firm was acquired by others in 2003. Some of the clothes he designed are in the Victoria and Albert Museum and other museum collections.

Following his mother's advice, he always carried his tailoring thimble in his pocket as a reminder of his trade origins and the need for humility, no matter how high one rises. He said that he desired his epitaph to be "He always kept his word."

He was a member of three City of London Livery Companies: the Worshipful Company of Merchant Taylors, the Worshipful Company of Blacksmiths, and the Worshipful Company of Gold and Silver Wyre Drawers. He became a Freeman of the City of London in 1949, and of the London Borough of Croydon in 1983.

== British Army ==
Weatherill enlisted as a private in the Oxfordshire and Buckinghamshire Light Infantry of the British Army a few days after the start of World War II. He was commissioned into the 4th/7th Royal Dragoon Guards in May 1941 and reached the rank of captain in 1943. He was attached to 19th King George V's Own Lancers, Indian Army, after being posted to Burma.

While on active service, Weatherill spent time in Bengal, where he embraced the local culture, including learning Urdu and taking up meditation. In response to having witnessed the Bengal famine of 1943, he became a vegetarian.

Weatherill was discharged from the Army in 1946, having served for seven years.

== Member of Parliament ==
He was elected Member of Parliament (MP) on 15 October 1964 for Croydon North East as a Conservative. He became a party whip three years later, and deputy Chief Whip six years after that. He was re-elected seven times for the same seat until his retirement in 1992.

From October 1971 to April 1973, Weatherill was Vice-Chamberlain of Her Majesty's Household, an office usually held by a Government whip, as Weatherill then was. He wrote a letter (hand-carried by messenger, or sent by telegram) to the Queen at the end of each day the House of Commons met, describing the debates, reactions, and political gossip. His letters are believed to have been more entertaining than the debates themselves. Weatherill is the most recent Speaker to have served in Government prior to the Speakership; his successors have all been longtime backbench MPs.

In 1979, Weatherill played a critical role in the defeat of the Labour government in a vote of confidence. As the vote loomed, Labour's deputy Chief Whip, Walter Harrison, approached Weatherill to enforce the convention and Gentlemen's agreement (otherwise known as pairing) that if a sick MP from the Government could not vote, an MP from the Opposition would abstain to compensate. Labour MP Alfred Broughton was on his deathbed and could not vote, meaning the Government would probably lose by one vote. Weatherill said that the convention had never been intended for such a critical vote that meant the life or death of the Government and it would be impossible to find a Conservative MP who would agree to abstain. However, after a moment's reflection, he offered that he would abstain, because he felt it would be dishonourable to break his word to Harrison. Harrison was so impressed by Weatherill's offer (which would have effectively ended his political career) that he released Weatherill from his obligation, and the Government fell by one vote.

He was sworn of the Privy Council on 8 January 1980.

== Speaker of the House of Commons ==
He was Speaker of the House of Commons from 1983 to 1992. As Speaker at the time television cameras were first allowed to cover proceedings in the House of Commons, he became widely known due to broadcasts of Prime Minister's Questions.

He was the last Speaker to wear a wig while in the chair. He commented that the wig is a wonderful device that allows the Speaker to pretend not to hear some things. He enforced the rights of Parliament to be publicly told of government policies before they were announced to the press or elsewhere. A portrait of him by Robin-Lee Hall hangs in Portcullis House.

== Life peer ==
He stood down in 1992, and was made a life peer on 15 July 1992 taking the title Baron Weatherill, of North East Croydon in the London Borough of Croydon. As is customary for former Speakers, the government put before the House of Commons an address to the Queen, asking that Weatherill be appointed a peer as a mark of "royal favour". Given a rare opportunity to discuss constitutional arrangements relating to the monarch and the Upper House, left-wing members of Parliament forced a debate on the petition.

He sat in the House of Lords as a crossbencher, the convention for former Speakers, irrespective of their previous party affiliation.

In 1993, he was elected alternate Convenor of the Crossbench Peers, and was a convenor from 1995 until 1999. In the House of Lords he made a major contribution to the House of Lords Act 1999 by stitching together the compromise that allowed a limited number of hereditary peers to remain as members.

In 2006, he became Patron of the Better Off Out campaign, calling for Britain to leave the European Union.

== Later life ==
In 1989, he succeeded Lord Blake as High Bailiff and Searcher of the Sanctuary of Westminster Abbey. He resigned both of those offices at the end of 1998 in protest at the manner in which the Dean and Chapter dealt with terminating the employment of the organist. He was succeeded by Roy Strong.

He was Vice-Chancellor of the British charitable Order of St John from 1983 to 2000, and was a knight of the Order from 1992.

An Urdu speaker, he was decorated with the Hilal-i-Pakistan (Crescent of Pakistan, second class) by the Government of Pakistan in 1993.

In 1994, he was named a deputy lieutenant of Kent.

He was a member of the European Reform Forum.

Weatherill was an advocate of vegetarianism and appeared at the first Vegetarian Rally in Hyde Park, London in 1990, alongside Tony Benn. He once stated, "as a lifelong vegetarian I believe that since man cannot give life he has no moral right to take it away".

In 2005, he announced he was suffering from prostate cancer. On 6 May 2007, he died from cancer at the Marie Curie Community Hospice in Caterham, Surrey, aged 86.

Bernard Weatherill House, council offices in Croydon, is named after him.

== Arms ==
Coat of arms of Bernard Weatherill
Crest A horse rampant Argent supporting a mace erect Or. Escutcheon Azure a cross floretty Or surmounting two lances in saltire Proper flying from each a forked pennon per fess Gules and Argent. Supporters Dexter a captain in the 19th King George V's Own Lancers (Indian Army) sinister a Knight of Justice of the Most Venerable Order of the Hospital of St John of Jerusalem both Proper. Motto A Stitch In Time

== Sources ==
- "Weatherill Papers". Library.kent.ac.uk. 10 October 2023.
- "Lord Weatherill". The Telegraph (obituary). 8 May 2007.

Parliament of the United Kingdom
Preceded by John Hughes-Hallett	Member of Parliament for Croydon North East; 1964–1992	Succeeded by David Congdon
Preceded by Oscar Murton	Chairman of Ways and Means; 1979–1983	Succeeded by Harold Walker
Preceded by George Thomas	Speaker of the House of Commons; 1983–1992	Succeeded by Betty Boothroyd
Preceded by Lady Hylton-Foster	Convenor of the Crossbench Peers; 1995–1999	Succeeded by The Lord Craig
Government offices
Preceded by Jasper More	Vice-Chamberlain of the Household; 1971–1972	Succeeded by Walter Clegg
Preceded by Reginald Eyre	Comptroller of the Household; 1972–1973	Succeeded by Walter Clegg
Preceded by Humphrey Atkins	Deputy Chief Whip of the House of Commons; Treasurer of the Household; 1973–1974	Succeeded by Walter Harrison
Party political offices
Preceded by Humphrey Atkins	Conservative Deputy Chief Whip in the House of Commons; 1973–1979	Succeeded by John Stradling Thomas
