= Walford Davis Green =

British politician (1869–1941)

Green in 1895.

Walford Davis Green (24 August 1869 – 17 November 1941) was a British barrister and Conservative Party politician. He sat in the House of Commons from 1895 to 1906.

Green was born in Blackheath, the son of Rev. Walford Green, a Wesleyan Minister and sometime president of the Wesleyan Methodist conference. He was educated at the Leys School in Cambridge, and at King's College, Cambridge, where he graduated with an honours B.A. in modern history in 1891. He won the Members' Prize in 1892 for his short book The political career of George Canning.

He was called to the bar at the Inner Temple in 1895.

He was elected at the 1895 general election as the Member of Parliament (MP) for the borough Wednesbury in Staffordshire. He was re-elected in 1900, and held the seat until he stood down from Parliament at the 1906 general election. After he had announced his intention to retire on health grounds, the local Unionist Association selected as its candidate F. E. Muntz, who had contested Rugby in 1900. However, Muntz was himself forced to withdraw due to ill-health, and consideration was given to asking Green to stand again since his health had improved. The Times reported that the Liberal Party candidate Clarendon Hyde had been nursing the constituency for some time, and that local unionists wanted Green to reconsider his retirement. However, Green did not stand again and the Unionist candidate Alfred Bird lost the seat to Clarendon Hyde.

He died on 17 November 1941 in Langton, Courtenwell, Tunbridge Wells, aged 72.

Parliament of the United Kingdom
| Preceded by Wilson Lloyd | Member of Parliament for Wednesbury; 1895–1906 | Succeeded by Clarendon Hyde |
