= Aubrey Moore =

English Anglican priest and scholar (1848–1890)

The Reverend Aubrey Moore
- Born: Aubrey Moore; 30 March 1848; Camberwell, England
- Died: 17 January 1890 (aged 41); Oxford, England
- Spouse: Catherine Hunt (m. 1876)

Ecclesiastical career
- Religion: Christianity (Anglican)
- Church: Church of England

Academic background
- Education: Exeter College, Oxford
- Influences: Charles Darwin; Thomas Hill Green

Academic work
- Discipline: Theology; philosophy
- School or tradition: Liberal Anglo-Catholicism
- Institutions: St John's College, Oxford; Magdalen College, Oxford; Keble College, Oxford

Aubrey Lackington Moore (1848–1890) was an English Anglo-Catholic priest and one of the first Christian Darwinians. He has been described as "the clergyman who more than any other man was responsible for breaking down the antagonisms towards Evolution then widely felt in the English Church".

== Life ==
Aubrey Lackington Moore was born on 30 March 1848 in Camberwell, England, the second son of Daniel Moore, vicar of Holy Trinity, Paddington, and prebendary of St Paul's.

He was educated at St Paul's School from 1860 to 1867, which he left with an exhibition, matriculating as a commoner of Exeter College, Oxford, 1867, whence, after obtaining first-class honours in classical moderations and literae humaniores, he graduated B.A. in 1871 (M.A. 1874).

He was fellow of St John's College, Oxford, 1872–1876; became a lecturer and tutor (1874); was assistant tutor at Magdalen College (1875); and was rector of Frenchay, near Bristol, from 1876 to 1881, when he was appointed a tutor of Keble College.

He became examining chaplain to Bishops John Mackarness and William Stubbs of Oxford, select preacher at Oxford 1885–1886, Whitehall preacher 1887–1888, and hon. canon of Christ Church 1887. A few weeks before his death, he accepted an official fellowship as dean of divinity at Magdalen College, Oxford, and when nominated simultaneously to examine in the final honour schools of theology and literae humaniores, accepted the latter post.

He died after a very brief illness on 17 January 1890 and was buried in Holywell Cemetery.

At Oxford, Moore had a position as a theologian and a philosopher of natural science, dealing with the metaphysical and scientific questions affecting theology. He lectured mainly on philosophy and on the history of the Reformation. Though rendered constitutionally weak by physical deformity, he had great powers of endurance and hard work, was a brilliant speaker and preacher, and distinguished as a botanist.

== Family ==
He married in 1876 Catherine, daughter of Frank Hurt, by whom he left three daughters. A fund of nearly £1,000 was subscribed to his memory by friends, from which an 'Aubrey Moore' studentship (for theological research), open to graduates of Oxford, was founded in 1890.

== Theology ==
Moore argued that Darwinism was not in conflict with Christianity. He differed from other religious figures of the time by accepting the theory of natural selection, incorporating it into his Christian beliefs as merely the way God worked. He wrote that evolution

as a theory is infinitely more Christian than the theory of "Special Creation." For it implies the immanence of God in nature, and the omnipresence of His creative power. Those who opposed the doctrine of evolution in defence of "a continued intervention" of God seem to have failed to notice that a theory of occasional intervention implies as its correlative a theory of ordinary absence [emphasis in original].

Moore was curator of the Botanical Gardens in England in 1887. He wrote two books: Science and Faith (1889) and Essays Scientific and Philosophical (1890), and was a contributor to Lux Mundi (1889).

H. O. Wakeman's History of the Church of England (1897) is dedicated to Moore.

== Selected works ==
- Essays Scientific and Philosophical (1890)
- Evolution and Christianity (1889)
- Lectures and Papers on the History of the Reformation in England and on the Continent (1890)
- Note on the Philosophy of Chuang Tzŭ
- Science and Faith (1893)
- Theology and Law (1884)
