= J. R. Illingworth =

English Anglican priest, philosopher, and theologian

The Reverend Canon J. R. Illingworth
- Born: John Richardson Illingworth; 26 June 1848; London, England
- Died: 22 August 1915 (aged 67); Longworth, England
- Spouse: Agnes Louisa Gutteres (m. 1883)

Ecclesiastical career
- Religion: Christianity (Anglican)
- Church: Church of England
- Ordained: 1875 (deacon); 1876 (priest)
- Congregations: St Mary's Church, Longworth

Academic background
- Education: Corpus Christi College, Oxford
- Influences: Augustine of Hippo; Robert Browning; T. H. Green; F. D. Maurice; John Henry Newman; John Ruskin

Academic work
- Discipline: Philosophy; theology
- Sub-discipline: Philosophical theology
- School or tradition: Liberal Anglo-Catholicism
- Institutions: Jesus College, Oxford; Keble College, Oxford

John Richardson Illingworth (26 June 1848 – 22 August 1915) was an English Anglican priest, philosopher, and theologian. He was a notable member of the set of liberal Anglo-Catholic theologians based in Oxford, and he contributed two chapters to the influential Lux Mundi.

== Early life and education ==
Illingworth was born in London on 26 June 1848 to an Anglo-Catholic family, the second son of Edward Arthur Illingworth (1807–1883), chaplain to Middlesex House of Correction, and his wife, Mary Taylor. He was educated at St Paul's School, an all-boys public school in London. As a child, he worshipped at St Alban's Church, Holborn, and at All Saints, Margaret Street. He won both an exhibition and a scholarship to attend the University of Oxford. He then studied literae humaniores (classical studies) at Corpus Christi College, Oxford, and achieved first-class honours in both mods and greats, graduating in 1871 with a Bachelor of Arts (BA) degree.

In 1900, Illingworth was awarded an honorary Doctor of Divinity (DD) degree by the University of Edinburgh.

== Career ==
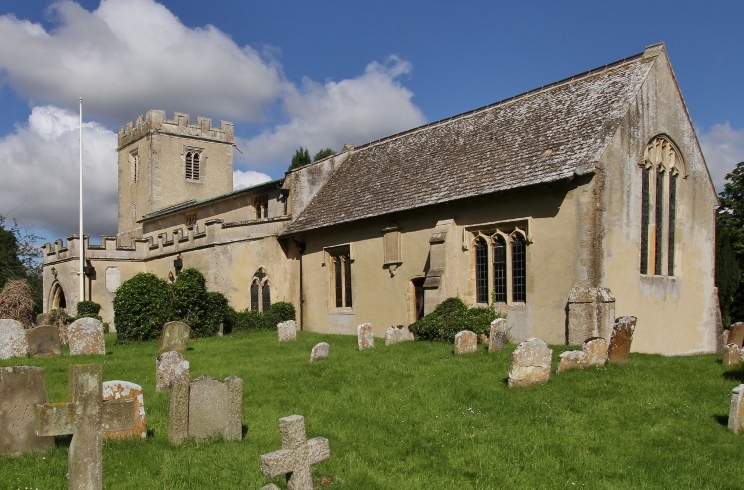
St Mary's Church, Longworth

From 1872 to 1883, Illingworth was a Fellow and Tutor of Jesus College, Oxford, and a Tutor of Keble College, Oxford. He was ordained in the Church of England as a deacon in 1875 and as a priest in 1876. From 1883 until his death, he was Rector of St Mary's Church, Longworth in the Diocese of Oxford. He was also a Select Preacher of the University of Oxford from 1882 to 1891 and of the University of Cambridge from 1884 to 1895. In 1894, he gave the Bampton Lectures at the University of Oxford; the series was titled "Personality, Human and Divine". He was made an honorary canon of Christ Church, Oxford, on 6 February 1905.

== Personal life ==
In June 1883, Illingworth became engaged to Agnes Louisa Gutteres. They were married at St Bartholomew's Church in Nymet Rowland, Devon, on 2 August 1883.

Illingworth died on 22 August 1915 in Longworth, aged 67, and was buried at St Mary's Church.

== Selected works ==
- Illingworth, J. R. (1881). Sermons Preached in a College Chapel. London: Macmillan and Co.
- Illingworth, J. R. (1889). "The Problem of Pain: Its Bearing on Faith in God". In Gore, Charles (ed.). Lux Mundi.
- Illingworth, J. R. (1889). "The Incarnation in Relation to Development". In Gore, Charles (ed.). Lux Mundi.
- Illingworth, J. R. (1893). University and Cathedral Sermons. London: Macmillan and Co.
- Illingworth, J. R. (1894). Personality, Human and Divine: Being the Bampton Lectures for the Year 1894. London: Macmillan and Co.
- Illingworth, J. R. (1898). Divine Immanence: An Essay on the Spiritual Significance of Matter. London: Macmillan and Co.
- Illingworth, J. R. (1902). Reason & Revelation: An Essay in Christian Apology. London: Macmillan and Co.
- Illingworth, J. R. (1907). The Doctrine of the Trinity Apologetically Considered. London: Macmillan and Co.
- Illingworth, J. R. (1911). Divine Transcendence and Its Reflection in Religious Authority. London: Macmillan and Co.
- Illingworth, J. R. (1915). The Gospel Miracles: An Essay with Two Appendices. London: Macmillan and Co.
