= 1954 Croydon East by-election =

UK Parliamentary by-election

The 1954 Croydon East by-election was held on 30 September 1954 after the death of the incumbent Conservative MP, Herbert Williams. It was won by the Conservative candidate John Hughes-Hallett.

Croydon East by-election, 1954
Party	Candidate	Votes	%	±%
Conservative	John Hughes-Hallett	21,640	56.6	−2.2
Labour	JW Wellwood	13,546	35.4	−5.8
Liberal	James Walters	3,060	8.0	New
Majority		8,094	21.2	+3.6
Turnout		38,460	67.5	
Conservative hold		Swing	+1.8	
