= European Reform Forum =

The European Reform Forum (ERF) is a committee of senior British politicians, journalists, academics, and businessmen who are seeking to produce a report on the future direction of the European Union. The members are drawn predominantly from a Conservative background. It was launched on 30 June 2005 in the Houses of Parliament in front of a large number of press. Over the six months of the UK presidency of the European Council the ERF took evidence from numerous people on both sides of the debate and produced a final report in December 2005. It advocated the renegotiation of British membership.

== Membership ==
- Chairman – Lord Waddington GCVO PC QC DL
- Lord Tebbit CH PC
- Lord Weatherill PC DL
- Lord Rees-Mogg
- Lord Blackwell
- Sir Oliver Wright GCMG GCVO DSC
- David Heathcoat-Amory MP
- Bernard Jenkin MP
- Secretary – Bill Cash MP
- Brigadier Geoffrey Van Orden MBE MEP
- Professor Tim Congdon CBE
- Professor Patrick Minford CBE
- Martin Howe QC
- Roger Brooke
- Andrew Roberts
- Ruth Lea
- Janet Daley

== People who have given evidence ==
- Lord Howell of Guildford PC
- Professor Lord Wallace of Saltaire
- Frederick Forsyth CBE
- Charles Grant, Director of the Centre for European Reform
