= Wilson Lloyd =

- Occupation: Politician
- Position held: member of the 25th Parliament of the United Kingdom (1892–1895), member of the 23rd Parliament of the United Kingdom (1885–1886)

Wilson Lloyd (3 September 1835 – 4 September 1908) was a British iron founder and a Conservative Party politician who twice sat in the House of Commons between 1885 and 1895.

Lloyd was the son of Samuel Lloyd (1795-1862), known as "Quaker Lloyd", and his wife, the abolitionist Mary Honychurch Lloyd. His father had developed the Old Park Ironworks at Wednesbury and by the mid-19th century, Messrs. Lloyds Foster and Co. was the town's leading ironworks, employing 1200 men. The family sold the Ironworks in 1867,

Lloyd became a J.P. and an Alderman. He was elected as the Member of Parliament (MP) for Wednesbury at the 1885 general election, but lost the seat in the 1886 election. He was Wednesbury's second Mayor from 1888 to 1890. At the 1892 general election, he was elected again as MP for Wednesbury, but he did not stand again at the 1895 general election.

Parliament of the United Kingdom
Preceded by Alexander Brogden	Member of Parliament for Wednesbury; 1885–1886	Succeeded by Philip Stanhope
Preceded by Philip Stanhope	Member of Parliament for Wednesbury; 1892–1895	Succeeded by Walford Davis Green
