= David Congdon =

British politician

Member of Parliament for Croydon North East
- In office 9 April 1992 – 8 April 1997
- Preceded by: Bernard Weatherill
- Succeeded by: Seat abolished

Personal details
- Party: Conservative

David Leonard Congdon (born 16 October 1949) is a former British Conservative Party politician. He was the member of parliament (MP) for Croydon North East, South London from 1992 to 1997.

== Political career ==
Congdon had served as a councillor for many years and served as Deputy Leader of Croydon Council. He was first elected to the House of Commons at the 1992 general selection, succeeding the outgoing speaker Bernard Weatherill who was retiring from the Commons.

The Croydon seats were reorganised ahead of the 1997 general election, with the loss of one seat. Congdon competed against Paul Beresford, then-MP for Croydon Central, for the Conservative Party nomination for the new merged seat and won. He then lost in the ensuing election in 1997 to Labour's Geraint Davies. Beresford, meanwhile, successfully contested Mole Valley and continued as an MP.

Congdon stood once again against Geraint Davies at the 2001 general election and lost. He then worked for MENCAP, and did not stand again at the 2005 election, when the Conservative candidate Andrew Pelling recaptured the seat from Davies.

== Personal life ==
Congdon is now retired and lives, with his wife Theresa, in Old Coulsdon. He has one daughter Rebecca and two grandchildren.

Parliament of the United Kingdom
Preceded by Bernard Weatherill	Member of Parliament for Croydon North East; 1992–1997	Constituency abolished
