= Sir Herbert Williams, 1st Baronet =

British politician (1884-1954)

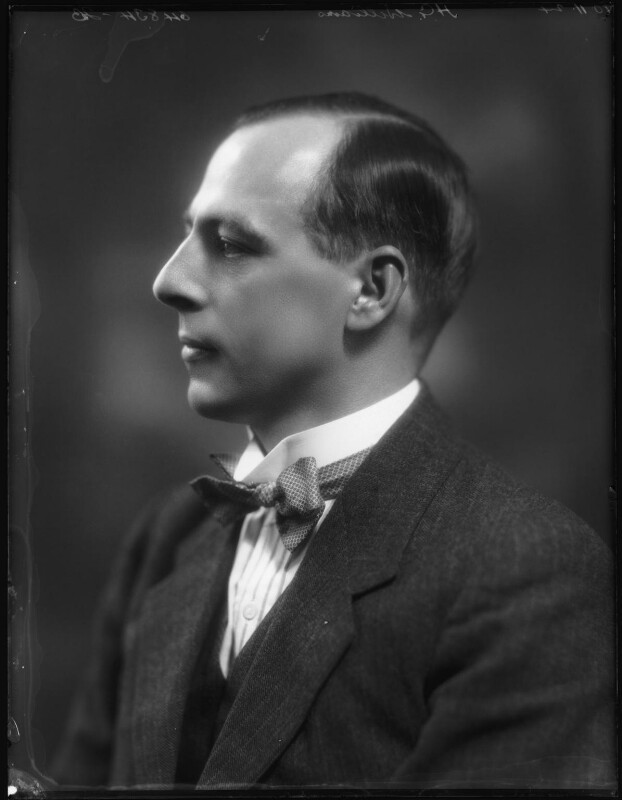
Williams in 1924

Sir Herbert Geraint Williams, 1st Baronet, (2 December 1884 – 25 July 1954) was a British politician and Conservative Member of Parliament (MP).

== Biography ==
Herbert Williams was born in Hooton, Cheshire, on 2 December 1884. He was educated at Liverpool University with degrees in science and engineering. In 1911 he became secretary and manager of the Machine Tools Trade Association. He served on Wimbledon Borough Council.

Williams contested the Combined English Universities in 1918 and Wednesbury in 1922 and 1923 without success. From 1924 to 1929, Williams was MP for Reading and served as Parliamentary Secretary to the Board of Trade. He was a member of the first Court of the University of Reading following its receipt of a Royal Charter in 1926.

Williams was returned to Parliament in Croydon South in a by-election in February 1932. He was comfortably re-elected in 1935 and served through the war. He was vocal in arguing against the Beveridge Report in Parliament, despite it being proposed by his Croydon Conservative colleague, Henry Willink MP. He was an alderman of London County Council in 1940–45.

Sir Herbert lost his seat in the 1945 General Election to Labour's David Rees-Williams. In February 1950, the Croydon seats were rearranged and the Conservatives won all three seats. Sir Herbert was returned in the new Croydon East seat and was re-elected in 1951. He was made a baronet on 3 July 1953.

He died in 1954 aged 69 and a by-election was held in his seat in September.

== Legacy ==
Herbert Williams wrote books on parliamentary matters, including The Member of Parliament and his Constituency.

Sir Herbert's daughter, Rosemary, married Glasgow property millionaire Sir Ian Mactaggart, Bt. Their daughter, Fiona Mactaggart was the Labour MP for Slough from 1997 to 2017

Parliament of the United Kingdom
Preceded by Somerville Hastings	Member of Parliament for Reading; 1924–1929	Succeeded by Somerville Hastings
Preceded by William Mitchell-Thomson	Member of Parliament for Croydon South; 1932–1945	Succeeded by David Rees-Williams
New constituency	Member of Parliament for Croydon East; 1950–1954	Succeeded by John Hughes-Hallett
Baronetage of the United Kingdom
New creation	Baronet (of Cilgeraint); 1953–1954	Succeeded by Robin Philip Williams
