= Natasha Irons (politician) =

British politician

Natasha Irons MP
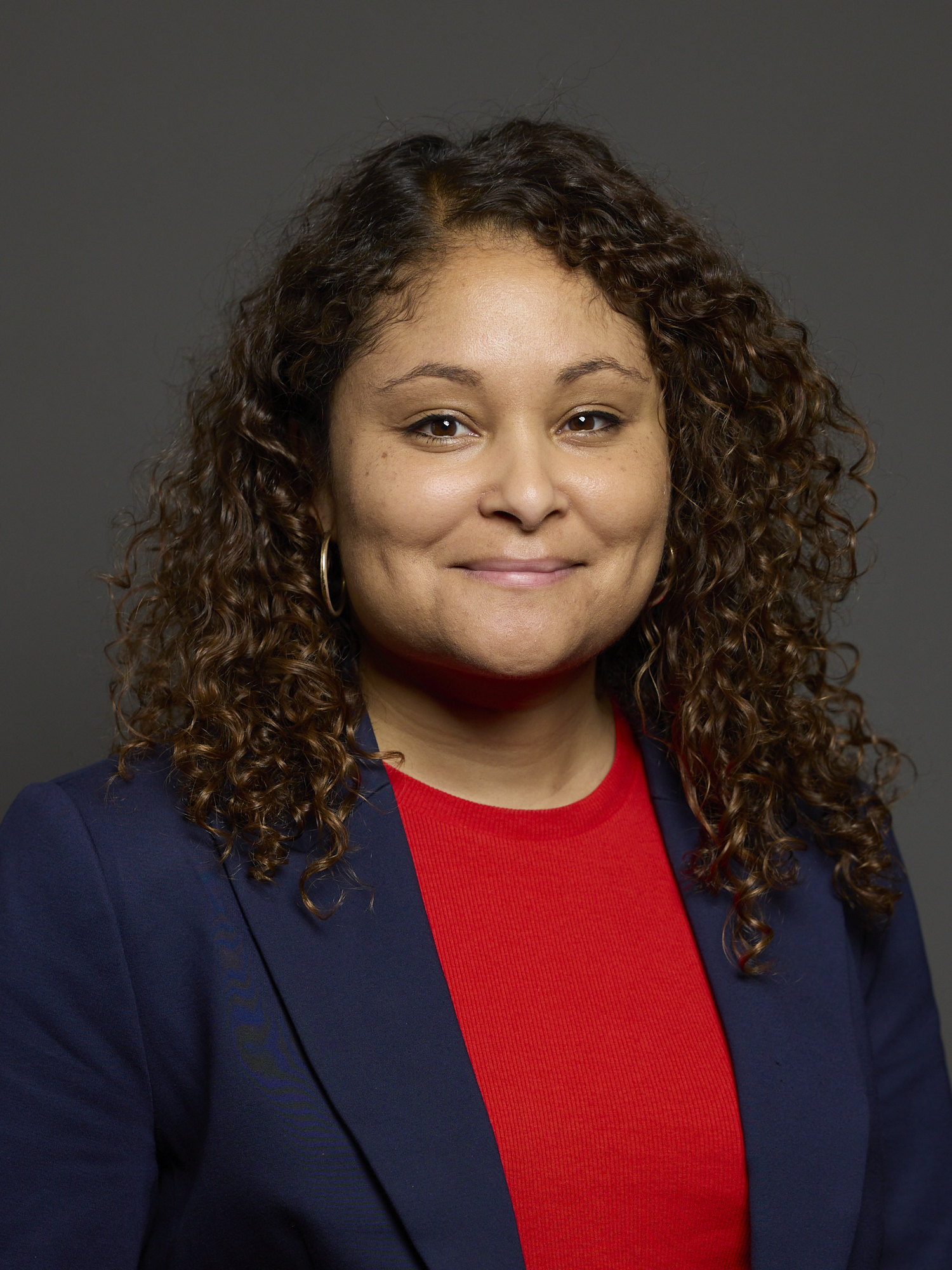
- Official portrait, 2024

Member of Parliament for Croydon East
- Incumbent
- Assumed office 4 July 2024
- Preceded by: Constituency established
- Majority: 6,825 (15.6%)

Personal details
- Born: Natasha Dawn Irons
- Party: Labour

Natasha Dawn Irons is a British Labour politician who has been Member of Parliament for Croydon East since 2024.

== Professional career ==
Irons was previously a media planning manager at Channel 4 Television.

== Political career ==
=== Merton Councillor ===
Irons is a former Labour councillor for Merton Council.

She was first elected to represent Ravensbury ward in 2018. In 2020, she was made Merton Council's cabinet member for local environment and green spaces. She was elected again in 2022 – this time representing Figge's Marsh ward – and took on the expanded role of cabinet member for local environment, green spaces and climate change, a position she held until her resignation.

=== Parliamentary career ===
Irons was elected MP for Croydon East in the 2024 general election and selected as a member of the Culture, Media and Sport Select Committee on 21 October 2024.
