= Wednesbury (constituency) =

Parliamentary constituency in the United Kingdom, 1868–1974

- Former borough constituency for the House of Commons
- County: Staffordshire

1868–1974
- Seats: One
- Created from: South Staffordshire
- Replaced by: Walsall North, Walsall South, West Bromwich West

Wednesbury was a borough constituency in England's Black Country which returned one Member of Parliament (MP) to the House of Commons of the Parliament of the United Kingdom from 1868 until it was abolished for the February 1974 general election.

Wednesbury became a parliamentary borough under the Reform Act 1867, taking territory that previously belonged to the constituency of South Staffordshire.

== Members of Parliament ==
Election	Member	Party
1868	Alexander Brogden	Liberal
1885	Wilson Lloyd	Conservative
1886	Philip Stanhope	Liberal
1892	Wilson Lloyd	Conservative
1895	Walford Davis Green	Conservative
1906	Clarendon Hyde	Liberal
1910	John Norton-Griffiths	Conservative
1918	Alfred Short	Labour
1931	Viscount Ednam	Conservative
1932	John Banfield	Labour
1945	Stanley Evans	Labour
1957	John Stonehouse	Labour Co-operative
Feb 1974	constituency abolished	

== Boundaries ==
1868–1885: The parishes of Wednesbury, West Bromwich, and Tipton.

1885–1918: The parishes of Wednesbury, Tipton, and Darlaston.

1918–1950: The municipal borough of Wednesbury, and the urban districts of Darlaston and Tipton.

1950–1955: The municipal borough of Wednesbury, and the urban districts of Darlaston, Wednesfield and Willenhall.

1955–1974: The municipal borough of Wednesbury, and the urban districts of Darlaston and Willenhall.

Over its existence the constituency had five different sets of boundaries, in each case combining the town of Wednesbury with neighbouring communities and reflecting population and local government boundary changes.

The new constituency was defined in Schedule B of the Representation of the People Act 1867 as comprising three Staffordshire parishes, namely: Wednesbury, West Bromwich and Tipton. Under the Redistribution of Seats Act 1885 West Bromwich was removed to become a separate constituency. In its place the parish of Darlaston was added to the seat. These boundaries were used until 1918 when the Representation of the People Act redefined constituencies in terms of the local government areas as they existed at the time. The Parliamentary Borough of Wednesbury was to comprise the Municipal Borough of Wednesbury and the Urban Districts of Darlaston and Tipton. The next boundary change, under the Representation of the People Act 1948, came into effect at the 1950 general election. Tipton was removed to become part of a new Rowley Regis and Tipton seat. Wednesbury Borough Constituency now comprised the Borough of Wednesbury and Urban District of Darlaston, to which were added the two urban districts of Wednesfield and Willenhall from the abolished seat of Wolverhampton East.

The final adjustment made was as part of a periodic review under the House of Commons (Redistribution of Seats) Act 1949. This came into effect at the 1955 general election, with Wednesfield transferred to the neighbouring county constituency of Cannock.

There were widespread local government changes in the Black Country in 1966, and all the local government districts making up the constituency were abolished and their areas absorbed into neighbouring county boroughs. This was reflected when the Wednesbury constituency was abolished in 1974, with its area being divided between the seats of Walsall North (Willenhall), Walsall South (Darlaston), and West Bromwich West (Wednesbury).

== Elections ==
=== Election in the 1860s ===
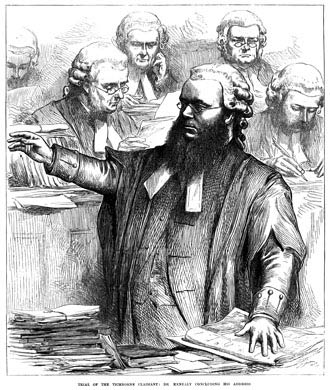
Kenealy

The local people were inclined to vote Liberal so there were several contenders for being the Liberal candidate selected, of whom Alexander Brogden was the man nominated. He was by that time, the senior partner in John Brogden and Sons, coal and ironminers, smelters and railway contractors. The other candidates were: Thomas Eades Walker, of the Patent Shaft Works, Conservative and Dr Edward Vaughan Hyde Kenealy, Independent.

The nominations were made on Monday, 16 November 1868 from a wooden husting erected on the South side of the Market Place. It was a lively occasion with all space taken, including windows and housetops. There was rioting and special constables had to be sworn in. Each candidate arrived in style and made a speech. By a show of hands organised by the Returning Officer, it was decided that the election would be held on the next day.

On Election Day, 300 police officers were marched into the borough, but again, there was rioting. This was the last general election at which voting was open. The state of the voting was collected hourly from the different booths by mounted messengers and announced. 10,995 voted out of 15,000 voters. The result was:

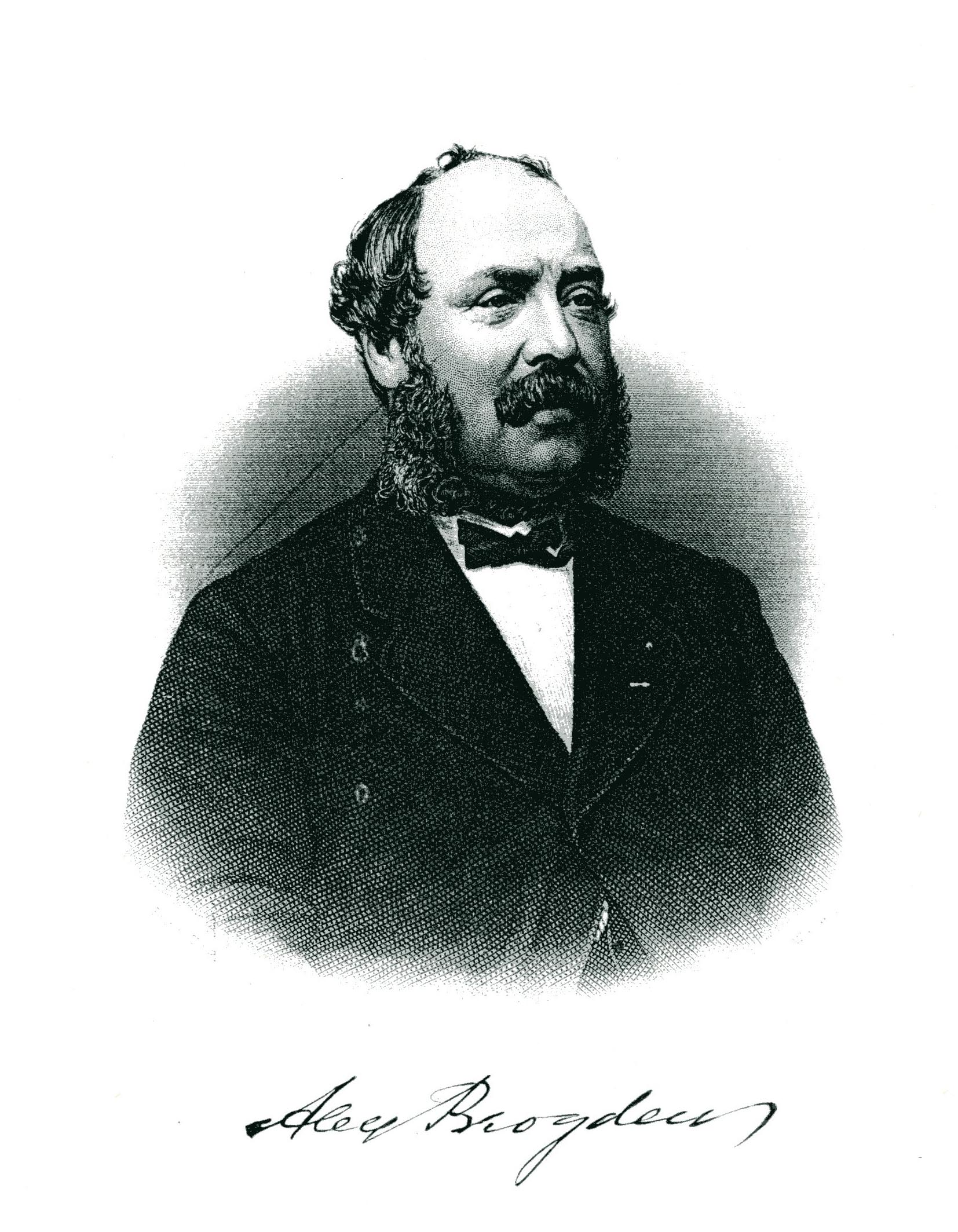
Brogden

General election 1868: Wednesbury
Party	Candidate	Votes	%	±%
Liberal	Alexander Brogden	6,129	56.3	
Conservative	Thomas Eades Walker	3,779	34.7	
Independent	Edward Kenealy	969	8.9	
Majority		2,350	21.6	
Turnout		10,877	76.2	
Registered electors		14,277		
Liberal win (new seat)				

=== Election in the 1870s ===
The second time the seat was contested was at the general election of 1874. Walker, the Conservative candidate at the previous election stood instead at East Worcestershire, where he won a seat. In his place, the Conservatives selected Richard Mills, a Darlaston Ironmaster. The result was:

General election 1874: Wednesbury
Party	Candidate	Votes	%	±%
Liberal	Alexander Brogden	7,530	56.4	+0.1
Conservative	Richard Mills	5,813	43.6	+8.9
Majority		1,717	12.8	−8.8
Turnout		13,343	65.5	−10.7
Registered electors		20,357		
Liberal hold		Swing	−4.4	

=== Elections in the 1880s ===
In the general election of 1880, Frederick Wootton Isaacson opposed the sitting MP. He withdrew shortly before the contest. However, his name remained on the ballot paper and he received a handful of votes:

Isaacson

General election 1880: Wednesbury
Party	Candidate	Votes	%	±%
Liberal	Alexander Brogden	6,912	97.1	+40.7
Conservative	Frederick Wootton Isaacson	207	2.9	−40.7
Majority		6,705	94.2	+81.4
Turnout		7,119	35.5	−30.0
Registered electors		20,035		
Liberal hold		Swing	+40.7	

At the next general election in 1885, there had been large boundary changes, in particular the removal of West Bromwich to form a separate constituency. The sitting MP did not defend his seat: Brogden's liquidation had been gazetted in January 1884 due to the failure of the family business. In his place, the Liberals selected the Hon. Philip James Stanhope. The Conservatives selected Wilson Lloyd, who gained the seat for the party.

General election 1885: Wednesbury
Party	Candidate	Votes	%	±%
Conservative	Wilson Lloyd	4,628	51.1	+48.2
Liberal	Philip Stanhope	4,433	48.9	−48.2
Majority		195	2.2	N/A
Turnout		9,061	83.8	+48.3
Registered electors		10,808		
Conservative gain from Liberal		Swing	+48.2	

Early in 1886, Gladstone introduced the First Home Rule Bill. The legislation divided the Liberal Party, and a general election was held. At Wednesbury, the same two candidates went to the poll and the result was:

Stanhope

General election 1886: Wednesbury
Party	Candidate	Votes	%	±%
Liberal	Philip Stanhope	4,883	53.6	+4.7
Conservative	Wilson Lloyd	4,221	46.4	−4.7
Majority		662	7.2	N/A
Turnout		9,104	84.2	+0.4
Registered electors		10,808		
Liberal gain from Conservative		Swing	+4.7	

=== Elections in the 1890s ===
The same two candidates fought the 1892 general election, with a narrow victory for the Conservatives with a majority of sixty votes:

General election 1892: Wednesbury
Party	Candidate	Votes	%	±%
Conservative	Wilson Lloyd	4,986	50.3	+3.9
Liberal	Philip Stanhope	4,926	49.7	−3.9
Majority		60	0.6	N/A
Turnout		9,912	88.5	+4.3
Registered electors		11,201		
Conservative gain from Liberal		Swing	+3.9	

In 1895, there were two new candidates. The Conservatives selected: Walford Davis Green, a barrister and grandson of Thomas Davis, ironmaster of Hill Top, while the Liberals chose Charles Roberts. Green retained the seat for the Conservatives. The result was:

Green

General election 1895: Wednesbury
Party	Candidate	Votes	%	±%
Conservative	Walford Davis Green	4,924	51.0	+0.7
Liberal	Charles Roberts	4,733	49.0	−0.7
Majority		191	2.0	+1.4
Turnout		9,657	89.0	+0.5
Registered electors		10,855		
Conservative hold		Swing	+0.7	

=== Elections in the 1900s ===
The 1900 general election was held at the height of the Second Anglo-Boer War. In this so-called "khaki election", Green, a supporter of the war, held his seat against the Liberal candidate, Enoch Horton, a Darlaston manufacturer.

General election 1900: Wednesbury
Party	Candidate	Votes	%	±%
Conservative	Walford Davis Green	4,733	50.9	−0.1
Liberal	Enoch Horton	4,558	49.1	+0.1
Majority		175	1.8	−0.2
Turnout		9,291	78.4	−10.6
Registered electors		11,856		
Conservative hold		Swing	-0.1	

At the 1906 general election, Green retired and in his place, the Conservatives nominated Alfred Bird, head of the manufacturers of Bird's Custard to defend the seat. The Liberals nominated Clarendon Hyde, a businessman, as their candidate. The Liberals polled well throughout the country, and they won a large majority in the House of Commons. Wednesbury was one of the seats the party gained from the Conservatives, and Hyde won a majority of 944 votes.

Hyde

General election 1906: Wednesbury
Party	Candidate	Votes	%	±%
Liberal	Clarendon Hyde	6,150	54.2	+5.1
Conservative	Alfred Bird	5,206	45.8	−5.1
Majority		944	8.4	N/A
Turnout		11,356	89.8	+15.4
Registered electors		12,639		
Liberal gain from Conservative		Swing	+5.1	

=== Elections in the 1910s ===
A general election was next held in January 1910: the sitting Liberal MP was opposed by a new Unionist candidate, John Norton-Griffiths, a civil engineer and former army officer. While the election had been called to seek a mandate for the so-called "People's Budget", the campaign in Wednesbury centred on the issue of tariff reform, with both candidates placing large wagers on the effects of policies on future food prices. Norton-Griffiths regained the seat for the Unionists.

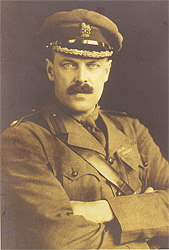
Griffiths

General election January 1910: Wednesbury
Party	Candidate	Votes	%	±%
Conservative	John Norton-Griffiths	6,636	52.4	+6.6
Liberal	Clarendon Hyde	6,040	47.6	−6.6
Majority		596	4.8	N/A
Turnout		12,676	94.0	+4.2
Conservative gain from Liberal		Swing	+6.6	

The result of the general election in January 1910 was inconclusive and another general election was held in December. Norton-Griffiths retained the seat for the Unionist Party against a new Liberal opponent, with an increased majority.

General election December 1910: Wednesbury
Party	Candidate	Votes	%	±%
Conservative	John Norton-Griffiths	6,423	53.0	+0.6
Liberal	Herbert Arthur Baker	5,691	47.0	−0.6
Majority		732	6.0	+1.2
Turnout		12,114	89.9	−4.1
Conservative hold		Swing	+0.6	

The next general election was delayed by the First World War, and was not held until late-December 1918. The sitting MP, Sir John Norton-Griffiths, was chosen to stand at Wandsworth Central in London. The Unionists instead nominated Archibald White Maconochie, a former Scottish Liberal Unionist MP and tinned food manufacturer. Norton-Griffiths that he would support the new candidate by flying by London to Wednesbury, to circle the town while dropping election literature and then landing and addressing a mass meeting, before returning to the capital. Permission was refused by the Air Ministry, however. The election was to be a three-sided contest, with Alfred Short, a Sheffield trade unionist, nominated by the Labour Party in addition to R L G Simpson of the Liberals. The Liberal vote collapsed and seat was one of the Labour Party's gains at the election, although the governing wartime coalition led by David Lloyd George won an overwhelming majority.

Short

General election 1918: Wednesbury
Party		Candidate	Votes	%	±%
	Labour	Alfred Short	11,341	49.8	New
C	Unionist	Archibald White Maconochie	10,464	45.9	−7.1
	Liberal	Robert Leveson Gower Simpson	988	4.3	−42.7
Majority			877	3.9	N/A
Turnout			22,793	66.2	−23.7
Registered electors			34,415		
	Labour gain from Unionist		Swing		
C indicates candidate endorsed by the coalition government.

=== Elections in the 1920s ===
At the next general election in 1922, Short was opposed only by a Unionist candidate, Herbert Geraint Williams, an economist who had worked in the Ministry of Munitions during the First World War. Short narrowly retained the seat.

General election 1922: Wednesbury
Party	Candidate	Votes	%	±%
Labour	Alfred Short	16,087	50.2	+0.4
Unionist	Herbert Williams	15,982	49.8	+3.9
Majority		105	0.4	−3.5
Turnout		32,069	85.5	+19.3
Registered electors		37,501		
Labour hold		Swing	−1.8	

Although the Unionist Party won an overall majority in 1922, another general election was held at the end of 1923. This followed the resignation of Prime Minister Bonar Law in May 1923 and concerns over unemployment and protectionism. The new Conservative Prime Minister, Stanley Baldwin called a general election for December 1923.

The same two candidates contested the constituency, and Short held the seat comfortably as the Labour Party saw an increase in votes.

General election 1923: Wednesbury
Party	Candidate	Votes	%	±%
Labour	Alfred Short	17,810	51.5	+1.3
Unionist	Herbert Williams	16,791	48.5	−1.3
Majority		1,019	3.0	+2.6
Turnout		34,601	88.7	+3.2
Registered electors		39,024		
Labour hold		Swing	+1.3	

The 1923 general election resulted in a hung parliament. Following the collapse of a short-lived minority Labour government, another general election was held in October 1924.

The Unionists chose a new candidate, Benjamin Garnet Lampard-Vachell, an international hockey player. Despite a drop in the Labour vote, Short held the seat by a slim majority.

General election 1924: Wednesbury
Party	Candidate	Votes	%	±%
Labour	Alfred Short	18,170	50.5	−1.0
Unionist	Benjamin Lampard-Vachell	17,832	49.5	+1.0
Majority		338	1.0	−2.0
Turnout		36,002	89.9	+1.2
Registered electors		40,035		
Labour hold		Swing	−1.0	

The next general election was held in May 1929. Four candidates were nominated: the sitting MP, Alfred Short for Labour; Harold Rubin for the Unionists, J. H. Stockdale for the Liberals and Thomas Gee who stood as "The Workers' Candidate". The campaign was very ill-mannered: Rubin issued writs alleging slander against Short, and Gee and was hospitalised after he was hit on the head with a brick thrown at him whilst delivering a speech on 20 May. Short held the seat with an increased majority.

General election 1929: Wednesbury
Party	Candidate	Votes	%	±%
Labour	Alfred Short	22,420	50.1	−0.4
Unionist	Harold Rubin	17,089	38.1	−11.4
Liberal	John Henry Stockdale	5,249	11.7	New
Workers	Thomas Gee	61	0.1	New
Majority		5,331	12.0	+11.0
Turnout		44,819	89.7	−0.2
Registered electors		49,971		
Labour hold		Swing	+5.5	

=== Elections in the 1930s ===
The 1929 general election led to a short-lived minority Labour Party government. The Labour Party split and a National Government was formed in August 1931. The National Government, comprising four parties (National Labour, Conservatives and two factions of the Liberal Party), went to the country in a general election in October 1931. The sitting MP, Alfred Short, remained with the main section of the Labour Party in opposition to the National Government. The National Government won a large majority: their candidate at Wednesbury, Viscount Ednam, a businessman and former Member of Parliament, unseated Short.

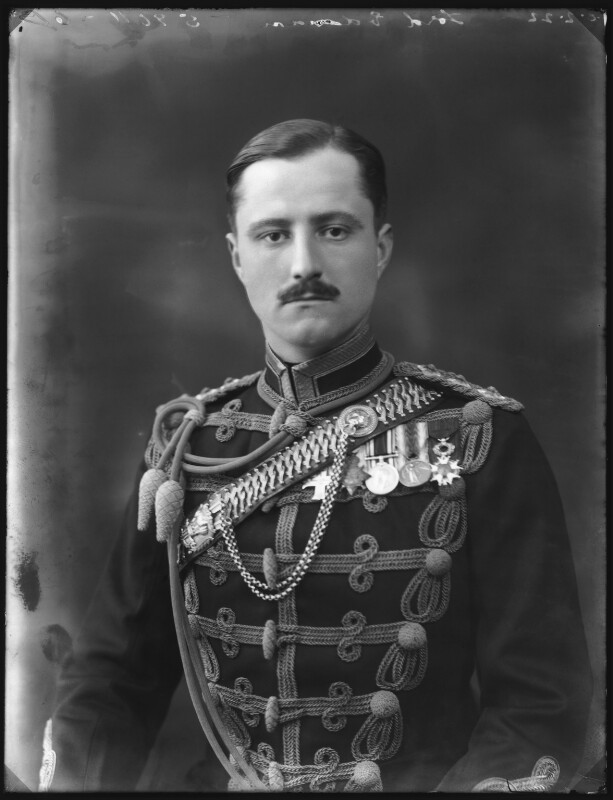
Ednam

General election 1931: Wednesbury
Party	Candidate	Votes	%	±%
Conservative	Viscount Ednam	25,000	54.5	+16.4
Labour	Alfred Short	20,842	45.5	−4.6
Majority		4,158	9.0	N/A
Turnout		45,842	89.0	−0.7
Conservative gain from Labour		Swing	+15.0	

Ednam only served as the Member of Parliament for Wednesbury for about eight months: on 29 June 1932 his father died and he inherited the title of Earl of Dudley and was elevated to the House of Lords. Prime Minister Ramsay MacDonald wanted a National Labour candidate from his party for the seat. He got pushed back from the local Conservative Party association who insisted in nominating their own candidate.

A by-election was held in July 1932: a new Labour candidate, John William Banfield, a trade union official, regained the seat for the party against the Conservative nominee, Captain Rex Davis, formerly of the Middlesex Regiment.

1932 Wednesbury by-election
Party	Candidate	Votes	%	±%
Labour	John Banfield	21,977	54.7	+9.2
Conservative	Rex Davis	18,198	45.3	−9.2
Majority		3,779	9.4	N/A
Turnout		40,175	78.0	−11.0
Labour gain from Conservative		Swing	+9.2	

The next general election was held in November 1935. The National Government candidate was the Rev. Herbert Dunnico, a former Labour Party MP, who had lost his seat in 1931 after which he switched to supporting the government. Banfield held the seat for Labour with a reduced majority.

General election 1935: Wednesbury
Party	Candidate	Votes	%	±%
Labour	John Banfield	22,683	53.3	−1.4
National Labour	Herbert Dunnico	19,883	46.7	+1.4
Majority		2,800	6.6	−2.8
Turnout		42,566		
Labour hold		Swing	-1.4	

=== Election in the 1940s ===
Following the outbreak of the Second World War in 1939, the life of the parliament elected in 1935 was extended, with the next general election not being held until July 1945. The sitting MP, J. W. Banfield, died on 25 May 1945 so the seat was vacant for the final few weeks of the parliament.

The Labour Party selected: Stanley Evans, a Birmingham-born industrialist, to defend the seat. His only opponent was Sebastian Earl, a champion rower and member of the National Labour Organisation. National Labour dissolved itself in June 1945, and Earl stood as a "National" candidate supporting the minority Conservative administration of Winston Churchill. The election resulted in a landslide Labour victory, and Evans was elected with a majority of nearly 16,000 votes.

General election 1945: Wednesbury
Party	Candidate	Votes	%	±%
Labour	Stanley Evans	29,909	68.2	+14.9
National	Sebastian Earl (Note: Due to National Labour dissolving as a party before the 1945 general election, Earl stood as a National candidate.)	13,974	31.8	−14.9
Majority		15,935	36.4	+29.8
Turnout		43,883		
Labour hold		Swing	+14.9	

=== Elections in the 1950s ===
The next general election was held in 1950. Evans was opposed by both Conservative and Liberal candidates. Henry Wilkins, a managing director of Wilkins & Mitchell Limited, washing machine manufacturers of Darlaston, was the Conservative candidate. The Liberals nominated J Bowker, a land agent and former chairman of the Worcestershire Liberal Federation. The constituency's boundaries had been considerably altered, and Evans held the redrawn seat with a similar majority to the one that he had achieved in 1945.

General election 1950: Wednesbury
Party	Candidate	Votes	%	±%
Labour	Stanley Evans	33,215	55.85	
Conservative	Henry Ravenscroft Wilkins	17,761	29.87	
Liberal	Ronald James Bowker	8,494	14.28	New
Majority		15,454	25.98	
Turnout		59,470		
Labour hold		Swing		

The 1950 general election resulted in a Labour government with a very slim majority in the House of Commons. In October 1951, the Prime Minister, Clement Attlee, called a general election seeking to increase his party's majority.

At Wednesbury, there was straight fight between Labour and the Conservatives, who nominated the same candidates as in the previous year. Evans was re-elected with a reduced majority.

General election 1951: Wednesbury
Party	Candidate	Votes	%	±%
Labour	Stanley Evans	35,196	60.51	
Conservative	Henry Ravenscroft Wilkins	22,971	39.49	
Majority		12,225	21.02	
Turnout		58,167		
Labour hold		Swing		

The 1951 general election, resulted in a Conservative government under the leadership of Winston Churchill. In April 1955, Anthony Eden succeeded Churchill as Prime Minister, and he called a general election in the following month.

There were once again two candidates at Wednesbury. The sitting Labour Party MP, Stanley Evans was opposed by Ronald Hall, a divisional inspector for the West Midlands Gas Board, running for the Conservative Party. Evans retained the seat, which had substantially changed boundaries.

General election 1955: Wednesbury
Party	Candidate	Votes	%	±%
Labour	Stanley Evans	26,064	60.4	−0.1
Conservative	Ronald Edgar Hall	17,120	39.6	+0.1
Majority		8,944	20.8	−0.2
Turnout		43,184		
Labour hold		Swing		

In November 1956, there was a vote of confidence in the Conservative government caused by the Suez Crisis. Evans abstained on the vote, being the only Labour MP not to follow the party whip. Although he was not disciplined by the Parliamentary Labour Party, the Wednesbury Divisional Labour Party were highly critical of him. On 17 November the Divisional Party unanimously passed a resolution calling on him to resign, and on 20 November Evans announced his resignation from both the House of Commons and the Labour Party. He formally resigned his seat by taking the office of Crown Steward and Bailiff of the three Chiltern Hundreds of Stoke, Desborough and Burnham on 26 November. The resulting by-election was held on 28 February 1957. The Labour Party selected John Stonehouse, a lecturer who had previously unsuccessfully contested two general elections at Twickenham and Burton-upon-Trent. The Conservatives chose Peter Tapsell, a former member of the Conservative Research Department. An independent candidate, Wolverhampton solicitor Michael Wade, announced his candidacy hours before the close of nominations on 18 February.

Stonehouse held the seat for Labour with an increased majority.

1957 Wednesbury by-election
Party	Candidate	Votes	%	±%
Labour Co-op	John Stonehouse	22,235	62.17	+1.77
Conservative	Peter Tapsell	9,999	27.96	−11.64
Independent	Michael Wade	3,529	9.87	New
Majority		12,236	34.21	+13.41
Turnout		35,763		
Labour Co-op hold		Swing		

The next general election was held in October 1959. The Conservative government, now under the leadership of Harold Macmillan, was re-elected with an increased majority. At Wednesbury, there was a three-way contest with Stonehouse holding the seat for Labour against the Conservative candidate Ernest Knight, Chairman of the West Midlands Conservative Teachers' Association, and Francis Wilmott, an industrialist standing for the Liberal Party.

General election 1959: Wednesbury
Party	Candidate	Votes	%	±%
Labour Co-op	John Stonehouse	24,157	52.1	−8.3
Conservative	Ernest Knight	17,464	37.7	−1.9
Liberal	Francis B Wilmott	4,780	10.3	New
Majority		6,683	14.4	−6.4
Turnout		46,401		
Labour Co-op hold		Swing		

=== Elections in the 1960s ===
The next general election was held in October 1964. Macmillan had resigned from the premiership in October 1963, and his successor, Alec Douglas-Home, failed to win the election for the Conservatives. The Labour Party under Harold Wilson won a narrow majority, returning Labour to government after thirteen years in opposition.

John Stonehouse faced a straight fight with the Conservative candidate David Harman, an electrical engineer and member of County Borough of West Bromwich Borough Council. He held the seat with a reduced majority.

General election 1964: Wednesbury
Party	Candidate	Votes	%	±%
Labour Co-op	John Stonehouse	23,473	53.7	+1.6
Conservative	David Michael Harman	20,251	46.4	+8.7
Majority		3,222	7.3	−7.1
Turnout		43,724		
Labour Co-op hold		Swing		

Wilson called a general election in March 1966 in an attempt to secure a larger majority. He succeeded, and the Labour Party were comfortably re-elected. At Wednesbury, the same two candidates fought the election, and Stonehouse saw his majority more than double.

General election 1966: Wednesbury
Party	Candidate	Votes	%	±%
Labour Co-op	John Stonehouse	26,041	58.9	+5.2
Conservative	David Michael Harman	18,213	41.2	−5.2
Majority		7,828	17.7	+10.4
Turnout		44,254		
Labour Co-op hold		Swing		

=== Election in the 1970s ===
The next general election was held in June 1970: the Conservatives under Edward Heath defeated the Labour government. At Wednesbury, the same two candidates fought for a third time. Stonehouse held the seat with a reduced majority.

General election 1970: Wednesbury
Party	Candidate	Votes	%	±%
Labour Co-op	John Stonehouse	23,998	53.8	−5.1
Conservative	David Michael Harman	20,627	46.2	+5.0
Majority		3,371	7.6	−10.1
Turnout		44,265		
Labour Co-op hold		Swing		

The constituency was abolished prior to the next election in February 1974. Stonehouse was subsequently elected MP for Walsall North which included part of the abolished seat.

== Sources ==
- Craig, F. W. S. (1983) [1969]. British parliamentary election results 1918–1949 (3rd ed.). Chichester: Parliamentary Research Services. ISBN 0-900178-06-X.
- Leigh Rayment's Historical List of MPs – Constituencies beginning with "W" (part 2)
