= Croydon Central =

UK Parliament constituency (1974–2024)

Coordinates: 51.369°N 0.054°W

- Former borough constituency for the House of Commons
- Boundary of Croydon Central in Greater London for the 2019 general election
- County: Greater London
- Electorate: 76,980 (December 2010)

1974–2024
- Seats: One
- Created from: Croydon South
- Replaced by: Croydon East, Croydon West

Croydon Central was a constituency created in 1974 and represented in the House of Commons of the UK Parliament from 2017 until its abolition for the 2024 general election by Labour MP Sarah Jones. (Note: A borough constituency (for the purposes of election expenses and type of returning officer)) (Note: As with all constituencies, the constituency elected one Member of Parliament (MP) by the first past the post system of election at least every five years.) The seat bucked the trend in national results in 2019, with Labour holding the seat with a slightly increased majority.

Under the 2023 review of Westminster constituencies, the majority of the constituency was incorporated into the re-established seat of Croydon East. Croydon town centre was included in the re-established seat of Croydon West.

== Constituency profile ==
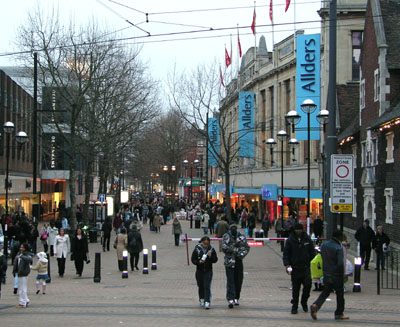
Central Croydon's main shopping area

Croydon Central covered a wedge of the London Borough of Croydon to the east of central Croydon and was more marginal than the other two parliamentary divisions in the borough; Croydon South (which was safely Conservative) and Croydon North (which was safely Labour).

The northern parts were characterised by terraced houses and urban areas, with small council estates. Labour gained much support from, in particular, Addiscombe, Fieldway, Woodside and Ashburton. The southern area, largely Conservative, consisted of suburban semi-detached houses, populated by commuters, surrounded by golf courses and parkland. The wards of Shirley, Heathfield and Fairfield gave large Conservative votes.

In the south-east corner was a large former council estate, New Addington; home to more than 10,000 people. The estate was largely White and has included the whole or vast bulk of one or two wards of the United Kingdom in its history.

The New Addington wards saw one of the highest turnouts of British National Party supporters during the 2002 and 2006 council elections, which the BNP described as their "heyday decade," however it never elected a local councillor from the party – its slate of councillors has been consistently from the Labour Party. Except on one occasion in 2010, where a Conservative councillor was elected for the first time since 1968. Historically, Labour's strength in the area had been on the council estates, particularly New Addington, but in 2014, Labour support was reduced by UKIP, gauging 24% of the overall vote.

The two major-stop railway stations on the national network, (Note: East Croydon station operates as a regional-level stop; West Croydon station has stopping and semi-fast services.) most office buildings, businesses and shopping centres of Croydon were within the constituency. A wide range of flats formed a major part of the housing sector unlike neighbouring seats, from upmarket expensively-built apartments with dedicated gym and restaurant facilities to ex-local authority brutalist architecture tower blocks, most of which had been replaced by the 2010s.

== Political history ==
The constituency that preceded Croydon Central, Croydon South (1918–1950) and (1955–1974) had the modern borough area's two periods of brief Labour Party parliamentary representation — David Rees-Williams held the seat from the 1945 Labour landslide until unfavourable boundary changes in 1950. David Winnick was MP 1966–1970. (Note: Winnick was returned to the House of Commons (1979–2017) for Walsall North in Staffordshire) Otherwise, the area at parliamentary level has elected, since 1918, Conservative MPs.

In 1997, Croydon's seats were reduced from four to three and the displaced Conservative members had to face one another for the right to stand in the new Croydon Central seat (Croydon North by then a Labour-held seat). The MP for Croydon North East, David Congdon was chosen over Sir Paul Beresford, the MP for the former Croydon Central seat. However, three years after Labour had taken control of Croydon Council, Labour's Geraint Davies saw off Congdon with a majority of 4,000 votes. He retained the seat with a similar majority in 2001, but lost by just 75 votes to Conservative Andrew Pelling in 2005, with the Liberal Democrats and Green Party gaining a local record of 7,000 votes between them.

The 2015 general election result, gave the seat the third-most marginal majority of the Conservative Party's 331 seats by percentage of majority. In 2017, Labour's Sarah Jones gained the seat with a majority of 5,652 votes, the largest in the seat for any party since 1992. Croydon Central was one of five constituencies, the others being Enfield Southgate, Leeds North West, Peterborough and Reading East; which elected Labour MPs in 2017 having not done so since 2001.

== Boundaries ==
Map of boundaries 2010-2024

Dates	Local authority	Maps	Wards
1974–1983	London Borough of Croydon		Broad Green, Central, New Addington, Shirley, and Waddon.
1983–1997	London Borough of Croydon		Fairfield, Fieldway, Heathfield, New Addington, Spring Park, and Waddon.
1997–2010	London Borough of Croydon		Addiscombe, Ashburton, Fairfield, Fieldway, Heathfield, Monks Orchard, New Addington, Rylands, Spring Park, and Woodside.
2010–2024	London Borough of Croydon		Addiscombe, Ashburton, Fairfield, Fieldway, Heathfield, New Addington, Shirley, and Woodside.

Croydon Central covered the central and eastern parts of the London Borough of Croydon, one of the Borough's three seats. It is bordered by Croydon North and Croydon South, as well as Beckenham to the east.

The seat was redrawn in the 1997 redistribution, taking in territory from most of the pre-1997 Croydon Central constituency (losing Waddon ward to the redrawn Croydon South) and part of the abolished Croydon North East constituency. It covered an area that was Croydon South constituency until 1974 when part of Surrey East was incorporated into a new Croydon South constituency, following the creation of the London Borough of Croydon in 1965.

== Members of Parliament ==
Election	Member	Party	Notes
February 1974	John Moore	Conservative	
1992	Sir Paul Beresford	Conservative	Lost preselection following redistribution
1997	Geraint Davies	Labour	
2005	Andrew Pelling	Conservative	
2007	Andrew Pelling	Independent	
2010	Gavin Barwell	Conservative	
2017	Sarah Jones	Labour	

== Election results ==
Results of UK House of Commons seat Croydon Central, created in 1974, since 2001.

=== Elections in the 2010s ===
General election 2019: Croydon Central
Party	Candidate	Votes	%	±%
Labour	Sarah Jones	27,124	50.2	–2.1
Conservative	Mario Creatura	21,175	39.2	–3.2
Liberal Democrats	Simon Sprague	3,532	6.5	+4.6
Green	Esther Sutton	1,215	2.2	+1.2
Brexit Party	Peter Sonnex	999	1.8	New
Majority		5,949	11.0	+1.1
Turnout		54,045	66.4	–4.9
Registered electors		81,410		
Labour hold		Swing	+0.6	

General election 2017: Croydon Central
Party	Candidate	Votes	%	±%
Labour	Sarah Jones	29,873	52.3	+9.6
Conservative	Gavin Barwell	24,221	42.4	–0.6
Liberal Democrats	Gill Hickson	1,083	1.9	–0.3
UKIP	Peter Staveley	1,040	1.8	–7.3
Green	Tracey Hague	626	1.1	–1.7
CPA	John Boadu	177	0.3	New
Independent	Don Locke	71	0.1	New
Majority		5,652	9.9	N/A
Turnout		57,091	71.3	+3.6
Registered electors		80,045		
Labour gain from Conservative		Swing	+5.1	

General election 2015: Croydon Central
Party	Candidate	Votes	%	±%
Conservative	Gavin Barwell	22,753	43.0	+3.6
Labour	Sarah Jones	22,588	42.7	+9.1
UKIP	Peter Staveley	4,810	9.1	+7.1
Green	Esther Sutton	1,454	2.7	+1.6
Liberal Democrats	James Fearnley	1,152	2.2	–11.0
TUSC	April Ashley	127	0.2	New
Progressive Democracy	Martin Camden	57	0.1	New
Majority		165	0.3	–5.5
Turnout		52,941	67.7	+2.7
Registered electors		78,171		
Conservative hold		Swing	–2.7	

General election 2010: Croydon Central
Party	Candidate	Votes	%	±%
Conservative	Gavin Barwell	19,567	39.4	–1.2
Labour Co-op	Gerry Ryan	16,688	33.6	–7.5
Liberal Democrats	Peter Lambell	6,553	13.2	+0.6
Independent	Andrew Pelling	3,239	6.5	New
BNP	Cliff le May	1,448	2.9	New
UKIP	Ralph Atkinson	997	2.0	–0.2
Green	Bernice Golberg	581	1.2	–1.0
Christian	James Gitau	264	0.5	New
Monster Raving Loony	John Cartwright	192	0.4	±0.0
Independent	Michael Castle	138	0.3	New
Majority		2,879	5.8	N/A
Turnout		49,667	65.1	+4.5
Registered electors		76,349		
Conservative gain from Labour (Notional.)		Swing	+3.1	

=== Elections in the 2000s ===
2005 notional result
Party	Vote	%
Labour	18,711	41.1
Conservative	18,490	40.6
Liberal Democrats	5,744	12.6
Others	2,585	5.7
Turnout	45,530	60.6
Electorate	75,166	

General election 2005: Croydon Central
Party	Candidate	Votes	%	±%
Conservative	Andrew Pelling	19,974	40.8	+2.3
Labour	Geraint Davies	19,899	40.6	−6.5
Liberal Democrats	Jeremy Hargreaves	6,384	13.0	+1.8
UKIP	Ian Edwards	1,066	2.2	+1.0
Green	Bernice Golberg	1,036	2.1	New
Veritas	Marianne Bowness	304	0.6	New
Monster Raving Loony	John Cartwright	193	0.4	–0.5
The People's Choice! Exclusively For All	Janet Stears	101	0.2	New
Majority		75	0.2	N/A
Turnout		48,957	60.6	+1.2
Registered electors		81,149		
Conservative gain from Labour		Swing	+4.4	

General election 2001: Croydon Central
Party	Candidate	Votes	%	±%
Labour	Geraint Davies	21,643	47.2	+1.6
Conservative	David Congdon	17,659	38.5	–0.1
Liberal Democrats	Paul Booth	5,156	11.2	+0.4
UKIP	James Feisenberger	545	1.2	+0.7
BNP	Linda Miller	449	1.0	New
Monster Raving Loony	John Cartwright	408	0.9	New
Majority		3,984	8.7	+1.7
Turnout		45,860	59.1	–10.5
Registered electors		77,568		
Labour hold		Swing	+0.9	

=== Elections in the 1990s ===
General election 1997: Croydon Central
Party	Candidate	Votes	%	±%
Labour	Geraint Davies	25,432	45.6	+14.1
Conservative	David Congdon	21,535	38.6	–16.9
Liberal Democrats	George W. Schlich	6,061	10.9	–2.1
Referendum	Charles Cook	1,886	3.4	New
Green	Mario−Simon Barnsley	595	1.1	New
UKIP	John Woollcott	290	0.5	New
Majority		3,897	7.0	N/A
Turnout		55,799	69.6	–5.2
Registered electors		80,152		
Labour gain from Conservative		Swing	+15.5	

1992 notional result
Party	Vote	%
Conservative	33,940	55.5
Labour	19,279	31.5
Liberal Democrats	7,934	13.0
Turnout	61,153	74.8
Electorate	81,757	

General election 1992: Croydon Central
Party	Candidate	Votes	%	±%
Conservative	Paul Beresford	22,168	55.4	−1.2
Labour	Geraint Davies	12,518	31.3	+6.9
Liberal Democrats	Deborah Richardson	5,342	13.3	−5.7
Majority		9,650	24.1	−8.2
Turnout		40,028	71.7	+1.2
Registered electors		55,798		
Conservative hold		Swing	−4.1	

=== Elections in the 1980s ===
General election 1987: Croydon Central
Party	Candidate	Votes	%	±%
Conservative	John Moore	22,133	56.6	+2.8
Labour	Bridget Prentice	9,516	24.4	+1.0
SDP	Tyrell Burgess	7,435	19.0	–3.8
Majority		12,617	32.2	+1.8
Turnout		39,084	70.5	+1.9
Registered electors		55,410		
Conservative hold		Swing	+0.9	

General election 1983: Croydon Central
Party	Candidate	Votes	%	±%
Conservative	John Moore	20,866	53.8	–1.4
Labour	Andrew MacKinlay	9,045	23.3	–11.2
SDP	Tyrell Burgess	8,864	22.9	+13.3
Majority		11,821	30.5	+14.7
Turnout		38,775	68.6	–7.1
Registered electors		56,531		
Conservative hold		Swing	+4.9	

=== Elections in the 1970s ===
1979 notional result
Party	Vote	%
Conservative	23,592	55.2
Labour	14,781	34.6
Liberal	4,093	9.6
Others	301	0.7
Turnout	42,767	
Electorate		

General election 1979: Croydon Central
Party	Candidate	Votes	%	±%
Conservative	John Moore	26,457	52.5	+10.4
Labour	David White	18,499	36.7	–5.1
Liberal	John Johnson	5,112	10.1	–6.0
Ind. Conservative	Michael Soper	238	0.5	New
Workers Revolutionary	Peter Gibson	116	0.2	New
Majority		7,958	15.8	+15.4
Turnout		50,422	75.7	+3.09
Registered electors		66,629		
Conservative hold		Swing	+7.7	

General election October 1974: Croydon Central
Party	Candidate	Votes	%	±%
Conservative	John Moore	20,390	42.1	+1.6
Labour	David Winnick	20,226	41.7	+3.7
Liberal	Ian Maxwell	7,834	16.2	–5.3
Majority		164	0.3	–2.2
Turnout		48,450	72.6	–7.1
Registered electors		66,746		
Conservative hold		Swing	–1.1	

General election February 1974: Croydon Central
Party	Candidate	Votes	%	±%
Conservative	John Moore	21,353	40.5	–6.8
Labour	Richard Rosser	20,039	38.0	–7.1
Liberal	Ian Maxwell	11,346	21.5	+14.5
Majority		1,314	2.5	+0.4
Turnout		52,738	79.7	+8.4
Registered electors		66,140		
Conservative win (new seat)				

1970 notional result
Party	Vote	%
Conservative	22,300	47.2
Labour	21,300	45.1
Liberal	3,300	7.0
Others	300	0.6
Turnout	47,200	71.4
Electorate	66,138	

== See also ==
- List of parliamentary constituencies in London
