= Lux Mundi (book) =

1889 collection of essays

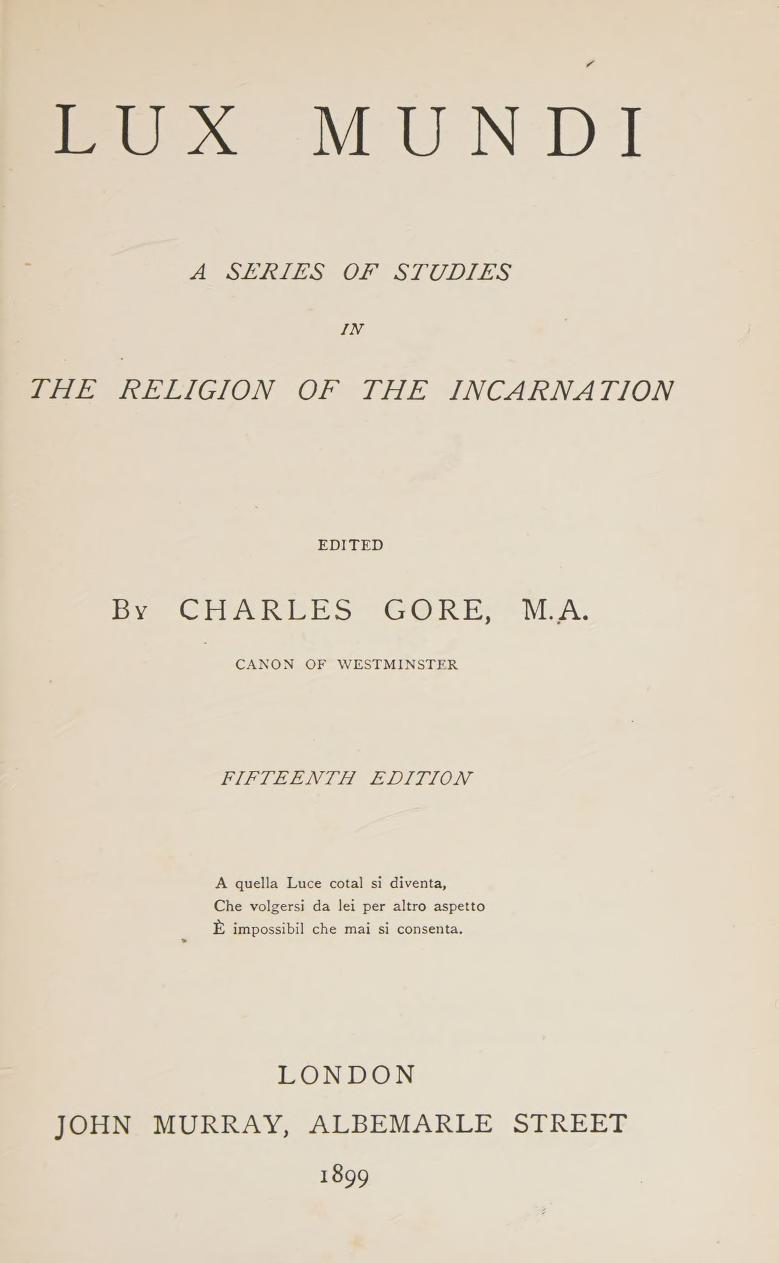
- Title page for Lux Mundi: A Series of Studies in the Religion of the Incarnation (1899 edition)
- Editor: Charles Gore
- Language: English
- Publisher: John Murray
- Publication date: 1889
- Publication place: England
- Media type: Print
- Pages: 525
- OCLC: 18790536

Lux Mundi: A Series of Studies in the Religion of the Incarnation is a collection of 12 essays by liberal Anglo-Catholic theologians published in 1889. It was edited by Charles Gore, then the principal of Pusey House, Oxford, and a future Bishop of Oxford.

Gore's essay, "The Holy Spirit and Inspiration", which showed an ability to accept discoveries of contemporary science, marked a break from the conservative Anglo-Catholic thought of figures such as Edward Bouverie Pusey. He subsequently remedied Christological deficiency in his 1891 Bampton Lectures, The Incarnation of the Son of God.

Gore and Lux Mundi came to influence the 20th-century Archbishop of Canterbury William Temple.

== List of contributors ==
- H. S. Holland ("Faith")
- Aubrey Moore ("The Christian Doctrine of God")
- J. R. Illingworth ("The Problem of Pain: its bearing on faith in God" and "The Incarnation in relation to Development")
- E. S. Talbot ("The Preparation in History for Christ")
- R. C. Moberley ("The Incarnation as the Basis of Dogma")
- Arthur Lyttelton ("The Atonement")
- Charles Gore ("The Holy Spirit and Inspiration")
- Walter Lock ("The Church")
- Francis Paget ("Sacraments")
- W. J. H. Campion ("Christianity and Politics")
- R. L. Ottley ("Christian Ethics")

== In popular culture ==
The novel Absolute Truths by Susan Howatch, the sixth novel in her "Starbridge" series, often refers to and quotes Lux Mundi in order to underpin the context of the Church of England in the book.
