= Croydon East (constituency) =

UK Parliament constituency (1950–1955, 2024 onwards)

- Borough constituency for the House of Commons
- Interactive map of boundaries from 2024
- Location within Greater London
- County: Greater London
- Electorate: 75,346 (March 2020)
- Major settlements: Addiscombe, New Addington, Selsdon, Shirley, Woodside

Current constituency
- Created: 2024
- Member of Parliament: Natasha Irons (Labour)
- Seats: One
- Created from: Croydon Central and Croydon South

1950–1955
- Seats: One
- Created from: Croydon North and Croydon South
- Replaced by: Croydon North East and Croydon South

Croydon East is a borough constituency which returned one Member of Parliament (MP) to the House of Commons of the Parliament of the United Kingdom from 1950 to 1955 by the first past the post system of election.

Further to the completion of the 2023 review of Westminster constituencies, the seat was re-established for the 2024 general election. It primarily comprises the abolished Croydon Central constituency – excluding Croydon town centre.

The seat has been represented since 2024 by Natasha Irons of the Labour Party.

== Constituency profile ==
Croydon East is a suburban constituency located in the Borough of Croydon on the outskirts of Greater London. It covers the eastern neighbourhoods of the large town of Croydon, including Addiscombe, Woodside, Shirley, Monks Orchard, Selsdon and New Addington. Like much of suburban London, Croydon grew rapidly during the 19th century with the arrival of rail transport and now serves as a commuter town. Wealth in the constituency is divided; the constituency contains four golf courses in the highly affluent area around Selsdon and Shirley, whilst New Addington has high levels of deprivation.

On average, residents of Croydon East have similar levels of income and professional employment to the rest of London, although they are less likely to be degree-educated. At the 2021 census, White people made up 55% of the population. Black people were the largest ethnic minority group at 22% and Asians were 13%. At the local borough council, most of the constituency is represented by Conservatives, although the areas closer to Croydon town centre (Addiscombe and Woodside) elected Labour Party councillors. In the 2016 referendum on European Union membership, an estimated 51% of voters in Croydon East favoured leaving the EU, similar to the country as a whole.

== Politics and history ==
Croydon East was a short-lived seat for the 1950 general election, creating three seats in the County Borough of Croydon from the previous two, taking in areas from the East Surrey constituency to the south. Croydon East took in areas of the former Croydon North and Croydon South constituencies, and East Surrey. It bordered Croydon West, Croydon North and East Surrey, and, when created, Beckenham.

All three Croydon constituencies were abolished at the 1955 general election, re-creating Croydon South and creating Croydon North East and Croydon North West seats.

During its first existence, Croydon East had Conservative Members of Parliament. It saw three elections: the 1950 general election, the 1951 general election and a 1954 by-election. Prior to 1950, Croydon South had been held by Labour but most of its voters were re-drawn into Croydon West.

In 2024, the re-established seat was won by the Labour Party with a majority of 15.6%.

In April 2026, four Labour party activists were charged with criminal offences over allegations that a party database was manipulated to increase a candidate's chance of selection for the 2024 election.

== Boundaries ==
Dates	Local authority	Map	Wards
1950–1955	County Borough of Croydon	Location within Surrey	Addington, Addiscombe, East, South Norwood, and Woodside
2024-present	London Borough of Croydon	Location within Greater London	Addiscombe East, Addiscombe West, New Addington North, New Addington South, Selsdon & Addington Village, Selsdon Vale & Forestdale, Shirley North, Shirley South, Woodside (most comprising polling districts WDS2, WDS3, WDS4, WDS5 and WDS6).

== Members of Parliament ==
Election	Member	Party	Notes
1950	Herbert Williams	Conservative	Died July 1954
1954 by-election	John Hughes-Hallett	Conservative	
1955	constituency abolished		
2024	Natasha Irons	Labour	

== Election results ==
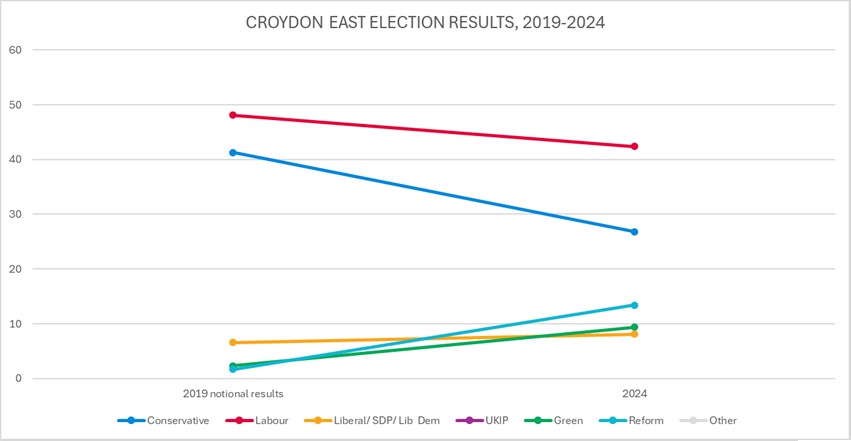
Election results 2019-2024

=== Elections in the 2020s ===
General election 2024: Croydon East
Party	Candidate	Votes	%	±%
Labour	Natasha Irons	18,541	42.4	–5.7
Conservative	Jason Cummings	11,716	26.8	–14.6
Reform	Scott Holman	5,862	13.4	+11.7
Green	Peter Underwood	4,097	9.4	+7.0
Liberal Democrats	Andrew Pelling	3,563	8.1	+1.5
Majority		6,825	15.6	+8.9
Turnout		43,779	57.1	–10.1
Registered electors		76,660		
Labour hold		Swing	+4.5	

=== Elections in the 2010s ===
2019 notional result
Party	Vote	%
Labour	24,340	48.1
Conservative	20,927	41.3
Liberal Democrats	3,341	6.6
Green	1,177	2.3
Brexit Party	837	1.7
Turnout	50,622	67.2
Electorate	75,346	

=== Elections in the 1950s ===
1954 Croydon East by-election
Party	Candidate	Votes	%	±%
Conservative	John Hughes-Hallett	21,640	56.6	−2.2
Labour	JW Wellwood	13,546	35.4	−5.8
Liberal	James Walters	3,060	8.0	New
Majority		8,094	21.2	+3.6
Turnout		38,460	57.5	
Conservative hold		Swing	+1.8	

General election 1951: Croydon East
Party	Candidate	Votes	%	±%
Conservative	Herbert Williams	32,282	58.8	+5.5
Labour	Alexander Bain	22,615	41.2	+3.4
Majority		9,667	17.6	+2.1
Turnout		54,897		
Conservative hold		Swing	+1.0	

General election 1950: Croydon East
Party	Candidate	Votes	%
Conservative	Herbert Williams	29,484	53.3
Labour	Marion Billson	20,903	37.8
Liberal	George Laing Gray	4,882	8.8
Majority		8,581	15.5
Turnout		55,269	
Conservative win (new seat)			

== Sources ==
- The Times House of Commons 1950. 1950.
- Leigh Rayment's Historical List of MPs – Constituencies beginning with "C" (part 6)
