= Longworth House =

Manor house in Longworth, Oxfordshire, England

Coordinates: 51.69196°N 1.44688°W

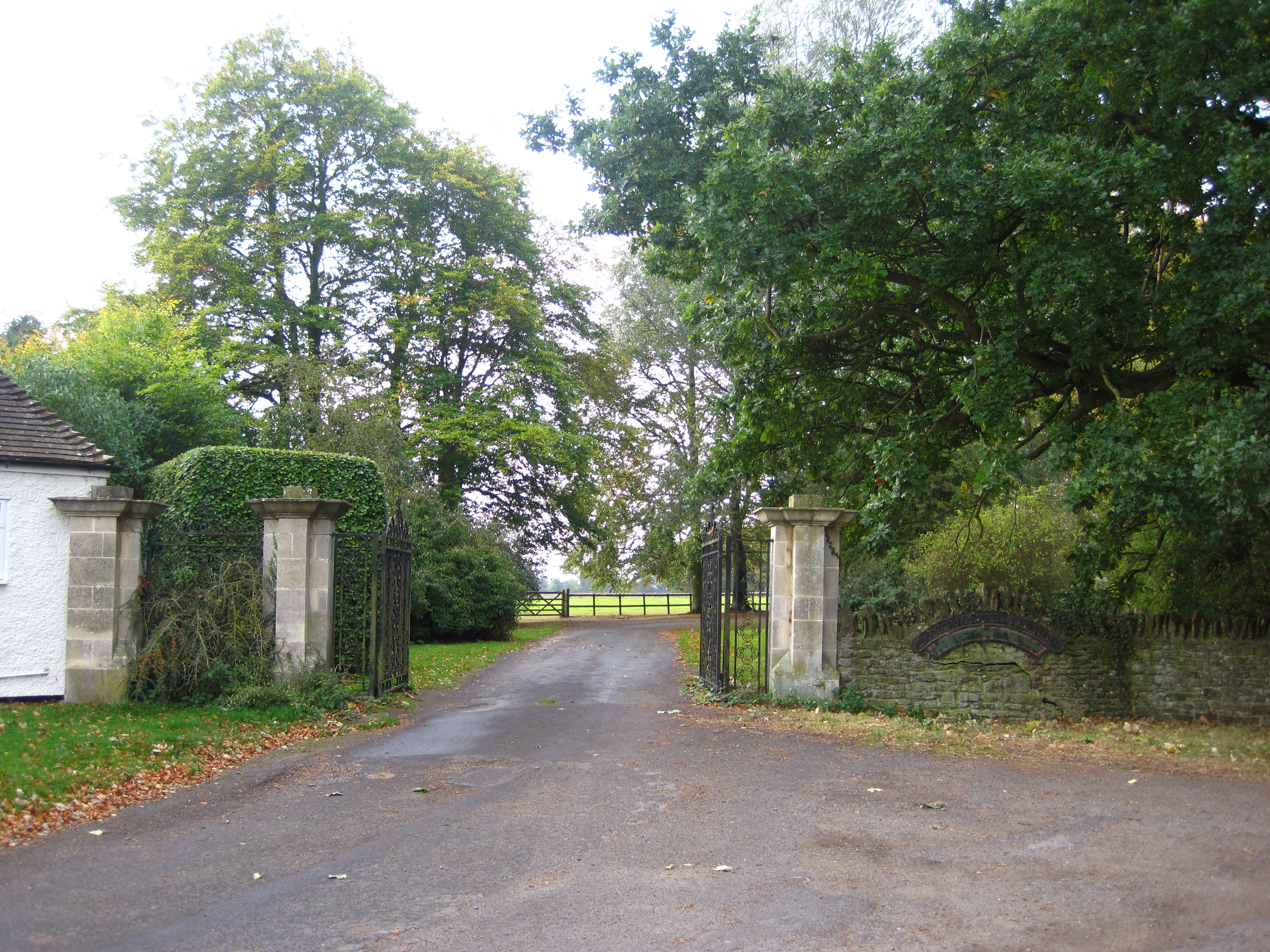
Longworth Manor gates

Longworth House is an historic country house at Longworth in the English county of Oxfordshire (formerly in Berkshire). It is a Grade II listed building.

It was owned by the Marten family during the 16th and 17th centuries and known as Longworth Lodge. Former residents include Sir Henry Marten, Judge of the Admiralty Court. Also Daniel Bunce who died in 1754 and William White who died in 1774.
