= John Hughes-Hallett =

British naval commander and politician

Vice-Admiral John Hughes-Hallett CB DSO

Parliamentary Secretary to the Ministry of Transport
- In office 26 April 1961 – 16 October 1964
- Prime Minister: Harold Macmillan; Alec Douglas-Home
- Succeeded by: Stephen Swingler

Member of Parliament for Croydon North East Croydon East (1954–1955)
- In office 30 September 1954 – 15 October 1964
- Preceded by: Herbert Williams
- Succeeded by: Bernard Weatherill

Personal details
- Born: 1 December 1901
- Died: 5 May 1972 (aged 70) Arundel, Sussex, UK
- Party: Conservative
- Relatives: Charles Hughes-Hallett (Brother)
- Education: Bedford School

Military service
- Branch/service: Royal Navy
- Years of service: 1918–1954
- Rank: Vice-Admiral
- Commands: HMS Illustrious, HMS Vernon, HMS Jamaica
- Battles/wars: Dieppe Raid, Norwegian campaign
- Awards: Distinguished Service Order

Vice-Admiral John Hughes-Hallett CB DSO (1 December 1901 – 5 April 1972) was a British naval commander and politician. He was the Naval Commander during the Dieppe Raid of 1942.

== Early life and career ==
Hughes-Hallett was born in December 1901, to a distinguished armed services family. His father was Colonel Wyndham Hughes-Hallett, his mother Clementina Mary Loch (25 Mar 1869 – 8 Dec 1948). They were relatively old at 56 and 31 years old, respectively, at the time of his birth.

Hughes-Hallett was educated at Bedford School, Royal Naval College, Osborne, Royal Naval College, Dartmouth and Gonville and Caius College, Cambridge. He had a distinguished career in the Royal Navy, beginning as a Midshipman on HMS Lion, May 1918. He was promoted to staff rank and during the Second World War served in a variety of roles. During the Norwegian campaign of 1940 he saw active service on HMS Devonshire and was mentioned in despatches.

== Later naval career ==
In 1940 to 1941 Hughes-Hallett played a key role in cross-Channel raids. He assisted in planning raids under Mountbatten and was the Naval Commander during the misconceived Dieppe Raid of 1942. Although the raid itself was not successful and cost many lives, it did lead to new strategies for cross-Channel operations. The actual proposer of the idea of the Mulberry Harbour is disputed, but it is believed by some to have been Hughes-Hallett. At a meeting following the Dieppe raid, he declared that if a port could not be captured, then one should be taken across the Channel. Although this was met with derision at the time, the concept of Mulberry Harbours began to take shape when Hughes-Hallett moved to be Naval Chief of Staff to the Operation Overlord planners.

Hughes-Hallett became Commodore commanding the Channel Assault Force and Naval Chief of Staff (X) from 1942 to 1943. Of the five Assault Forces, Hughes-Hallett's Force "J" started its training with a decided advantage over the other four; its nucleus having been formed as far back as October 1942, with headquarters at Cowes. On 1 May 1943, Commodore Hughes-Hallett succeeded Rear Admiral Philip Vian as the head of the Naval Branch at Supreme Allied Command. He served as Captain of HMS Jamaica from December 1943. After the war, he was in command of HMS Vernon, (1946-8). Vernon in Portsmouth was the navy's Torpedo training centre and he had to cope with the problems arising from the recent creation of the Electrical branch. Until this a ship's electrics had been looked after by torpedomen but they had become so complex a new separate branch was deemed necessary. He then commanded HMS Illustrious'(1948–1949) and after that was Vice-Controller of the Navy in Bath, 1950–1952, and then Flag Officer, Heavy Squadron, Home Fleet, 1952–3. A strict disciplinarian, he was sometimes known as 'Hughes-Hitler'.

== Political career ==
Hughes-Hallett retired from the Royal Navy in 1954 as Vice-Admiral on his adoption as a Conservative Parliamentary candidate. A problem arose when he enquired of the Secretary of the Admiralty what pension he could expect, at that time MPs got no pension, and the Secretary erroneously gave him a figure that was far too high. When he discovered this he threatened legal proceedings and as he was now an MP this was very embarrassing to the Government; it was discussed at Cabinet level on at least two occasions. (Cabinet Minutes in National Archives).

First elected in September 1954, he served as the Member of Parliament for Croydon East, later Croydon North East, until the 1964 election, defeating Labour's Walter Wolfgang at the 1959 general election.

He was a British Representative at the Council of Europe between 1958 and 1960 and Parliamentary Secretary to the Ministry of Transport for Shipping and Shipbuilding, 1961 to 1964. In the 1958–59 parliament, he successfully piloted his private members bill through parliament, although only tenth in the ballot. It became the Road Traffic (Driving of Motor Cycles) Act.

He was popular among the Young Conservatives and always interested in their activities.

== Later years ==
In the late 1960s he suffered a serious stroke which hampered further activities. In his last years he lived in Slindon, near Arundel, Sussex, England and died in 1972. He never married. His brother, Charles Hughes-Hallett was a Rear Admiral. He had drafted memoirs, but they have not as yet been published.

== Film portrayals ==
Captain Hughes-Hallett was a major character in the Canadian CBC miniseries Dieppe, in which he was played by actor Robert Joy.

== Homage ==
Around 1990, a street in Caen (France) was named after Commodore Hughes-Hallett, linking avenue Admiral Mountbatten to avenue Maréchal Montgomery and rue Colonel Rémy, in a district close to the Mémorial pour la Paix museum, where a majority of streets commemorate personalities linked with the Second World War, the Résistance, and the subsequent making of the European Economic Community. Unfortunately, the surname is misspelt: rue Commodore J.H. Hallet.

== Notes ==
Parliament of the United Kingdom
Preceded by Herbert Williams	Member of Parliament for Croydon East; 1954–1955	Constituency abolished
New constituency	Member of Parliament for Croydon North East; 1955–1964	Succeeded by Bernard Weatherill
