= Charles Hughes-Hallett =

Royal Navy admiral (1898–1985)

Vice-Admiral Sir Charles Hughes-Hallett KCB CBE
- Born: 6 April 1898
- Died: 2 December 1985 (aged 87)
- Military career
- Allegiance: United Kingdom
- Branch: Royal Navy
- Rank: Vice-Admiral
- Commands: HMS Implacable
- Conflicts: World War I World War II
- Awards: KCB, CBE
- Education: Bedford School
- Alma mater: Emmanuel College, Cambridge
- Relatives: Vice Admiral John Hughes-Hallett CB DSO (brother)

Vice-Admiral Sir Cecil Charles Hughes-Hallett KCB CBE (6 April 1898 – 2 December 1985) was a senior Royal Navy officer.

== Biography ==
Born on 6 April 1898, Charles Hughes-Hallett was educated at Bedford School, Emmanuel College, Cambridge, the Royal Naval College, Osborne and at the Royal Naval College, Dartmouth. He served in the Royal Navy during the First World War and was present at the Battle of the Dardanelles and at the Battle of Jutland. After distinguished service during the Second World War he was appointed as Chief of Staff to the Commander-in-Chief, Home Fleet between 1950 and 1951. He was appointed as Head of British Naval Mission, Washington between 1952 and 1954.

The brother of Vice Admiral John Hughes-Hallett CB DSO, Vice Admiral Charles Hughes-Hallett died on 2 December 1985.
