= St Mary's Church, Longworth =

Coordinates: 51.692657°N 1.445783°W

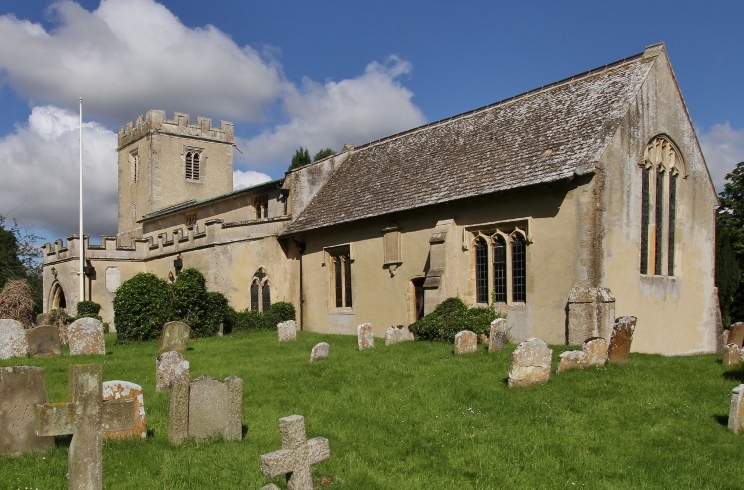
- St Mary's Church, Longworth
- OS grid reference: SU 38405 99468
- Location: Longworth, Oxfordshire
- Country: England
- Denomination: Church of England
- Previous denomination: Roman Catholic Church
- Churchmanship: Central

History
- Status: Active

Architecture
- Functional status: Parish church
- Years built: 13th century

Administration
- Diocese: Oxford
- Archdeaconry: Dorchester
- Deanery: Vale of White Horse
- Parish: Longworth

Clergy
- Rector: Talisker Tracey-MacLeod

St Mary's Church is a Church of England parish church in Longworth, Oxfordshire (formerly Berkshire). The church is a Grade I listed building.

== History ==
The oldest parts of the church date to the 13th-century. The current chancel, west tower, and north aisle were built in the 15th century.

The tower has a ring of five bells. Richard Keene of Woodstock cast the third, fourth and tenor bells in 1662. Henry III Bagley of Chacombe, Northamptonshire, cast the second bell in 1746, presumably at his foundry at Witney. James Wells of Aldbourne, Wiltshire, cast the treble bell in 1807. St Mary's has also a Sanctus bell that was cast in about 1890 by an unknown founder. The five bells are currently unringable.

On 21 November 1966, the church was designated a Grade I listed building.

== Present day ==
St Mary's parish is part of the benefice of Cherbury with Gainfield in the Archdeaconry of Dorchester of the Diocese of Oxford. It stands in the central tradition of the Church of England.

== Notable clergy ==
- J. R. Illingworth, served as Rector from 1883 to 1915
