= Clarendon Hyde =

British businessman and Liberal Party politician (1858–1934)

Clarendon Hyde

Sir Clarendon Golding Hyde (5 February 1858 – 24 June 1934) was a British businessman and Liberal Party politician. He sat in the House of Commons from 1906 to 1910, but his most significant public service was his participation in numerous government committees.

== Early life ==
Hyde was educated at the Royal Institution School in Liverpool and at King's College London, and was called to the bar in 1881 at the Middle Temple. He joined the Oxford Circuit, but soon gave up his law practice.

== Career ==
Hyde unsuccessfully contested Southampton at the 1900 general election. He was elected at the 1906 general election as the Member of Parliament (MP) for the borough Wednesbury in Staffordshire. He had been nursing the Unionist-held constituency for some time, and won the seat with a majority of 944, 8.4% of the votes. However, he was defeated at the January 1910 general election.

He was knighted in the King's Birthday Honours in June 1910, and contested Cardiff Boroughs at the December 1910 general election, where the sitting Liberal MP David Alfred Thomas had retired from politics. However, the seat was won by the Unionist Lord Ninian Crichton-Stuart. The Times reported that "the result is remarkable".

He was a partner in the construction firm S. Pearson & Son, and had written several treatises on company law. However, both before and after his term in Parliament, Hyde was a member of a long range of government committees and other bodies. Before World War I he served on the Board of Trade's Court of Arbitration in 1909, the Lace makers Trade Board, the Taxi Cab Inquiry and as chairman of the Cannock Chase Miner's Minimum Wage Board.

During the First World War, he served on a long list of committees, mostly related to industrial policy.

== Family ==
In 1886 Hyde married Laura Adrie Palmer, daughter of Canon G. T. Palmer. They had one daughter.

He died of pneumonia, aged 76, on 24 June 1934, at Longworth, Farringdon, Berkshire.

Parliament of the United Kingdom
Preceded by Walford Green	Member of Parliament for Wednesbury; 1906 – January 1910	Succeeded by John Norton-Griffiths
