= Parliamentary constituencies in Oxfordshire =

The county of Oxfordshire in relation to England

The county of Oxfordshire is divided into 7 parliamentary constituencies: 1 borough constituency and 6 county constituencies.

== Constituencies ==
† Conservative ‡ Labour ¤ Liberal Democrat ♣ Green

Constituency (Note: BC denotes borough constituency, CC denotes county constituency.)	Electorate	Majority	Member of Parliament	Nearest opposition	Electoral wards	Map
Banbury CC	69,943	3,256	Sean Woodcock‡	Victoria Prentis†	Cherwell District Council: Adderbury, Bloxham & Bodicote; Banbury Calthorpe & Easington; Banbury Grimsbury & Hightown; Banbury Cross & Neithrop; Banbury Hardwick; Banbury Ruscote; Cropredy, Sibfords & Wroxton; Deddington. West Oxfordshire District Council: Chadlington and Churchill; Charlbury and Finstock; Chipping Norton; Kingham, Rollright and Enstone; The Bartons.	
Bicester and Woodstock CC	70,389	4,958	Calum Miller¤	Rupert Harrison†	Cherwell District Council: Bicester East; Bicester North & Caversfield; Bicester South & Ambrosden; Bicester West; Fringford & Heyfords; Kidlington East; Kidlington West; Launton & Otmoor. West Oxfordshire District Council: Eynsham and Cassington; Freeland and Hanborough; North Leigh; Stonesfield and Tackley; Woodstock and Bladon.	
Didcot and Wantage CC	74,356	6,233	Olly Glover¤	David Johnston	South Oxfordshire District Council: Cholsey; Didcot North East; Didcot South; Didcot West; Sandford & the Wittenhams; Wallingford. Vale of White Horse District Council: Blewbury & Harwell; Drayton; Grove North; Hendreds; Ridgeway; Stanford; Steventon & the Hanneys; Sutton Courtenay; Wantage & Grove Brook; Wantage Charlton.	
Henley and Thame CC	70,626	6,267	Freddie Van Mierlo¤	Caroline Newton	South Oxfordshire District Council: Benson & Crowmarsh; Berinsfield; Chalgrove; Chinnor; Forest Hill & Holton; Garsington & Horspath; Goring; Haseley Brook; Henley-on-Thames; Kidmore End & Whitchurch; Sonning Common; Thame; Watlington; Wheatley; Woodcote & Rotherfield.	
Oxford East BC	72,371	14,465	Anneliese Dodds‡	Sushila Dhall♣	Oxford City Council: Barton & Sandhills; Blackbird Leys; Churchill; Cowley; Donnington; Headington; Headington Hill & Northway; Hinksey Park; Littlemore; Lye Valley; Marston; Northfield Brook; Quarry & Risinghurst; Rose Hill & Iffley; St. Clement's; St. Mary's; Temple Cowley.	
Oxford West and Abingdon CC	72,004	14,894	Layla Moran¤	Vinay Raniga	Oxford City Council: Carfax & Jericho; Cutteslowe & Sunnymead; Holywell; Osney & St Thomas; Summertown; Walton Manor; Wolvercote. Vale of White Horse District Council: Abingdon Abbey Northcourt; Abingdon Caldecott; Abingdon Dunmore; Abingdon Fitzharris; Abingdon Peachcroft; Botley & Sunningwell; Cumnor; Kennington & Radley; Marcham; Wootton.	
Witney CC	70,042	4,339	Charlie Maynard¤	Robert Courts	Vale of White Horse District Council: Faringdon; Kingston Bagpuize; Thames; Watchfield & Shrivenham. West Oxfordshire District Council: Alvescot and Filkins; Ascott and Shipton; Bampton and Clanfield; Brize Norton and Shilton; Burford; Carterton North East; Carterton North West; Carterton South; Ducklington; Hailey, Minster Lovell and Leafield; Milton-under-Wychwood; Standlake, Aston and Stanton Harcourt; Witney Central; Witney East; Witney North; Witney South; Witney West.	

== 2024 changes ==
See 2023 Periodic Review of Westminster constituencies for further details.

Former name
1. Banbury
2. Henley
3. Oxford East
4. Oxford West and Abingdon
5. Wantage
6. Witney
Boundaries 2010-2024

2010-2024 constituencies in Oxfordshire

Current name
1. Banbury
2. Bicester and Woodstock
3. Didcot and Wantage
4. Henley and Thame
5. Oxford East
6. Oxford West and Abingdon
7. Witney
Boundaries 2024–present

Current constituencies in Oxfordshire

For the 2023 Periodic Review of Westminster constituencies, which redrew the constituency map ahead of the 2024 United Kingdom general election, the Boundary Commission for England increased the number of seats in Oxfordshire from six to seven, due to the electorates of all six existing constituencies being above the maximum allowed quota. This resulted in the formation of the new constituency of Bicester and Woodstock. Wantage was renamed Didcot and Wantage, and Henley renamed Henley and Thame.

The following constituencies resulted from the review:

Containing electoral wards from Cherwell

- Banbury (part)
- Bicester and Woodstock (part)

Containing electoral wards from Oxford

- Oxford East
- Oxford West and Abingdon (part)

Containing electoral wards from South Oxfordshire

- Henley and Thame
- Didcot and Wantage (part)

Containing electoral wards from Vale of White Horse

- Didcot and Wantage (part)
- Oxford West and Abingdon (part)
- Witney (part)

Containing electoral wards from West Oxfordshire

- Banbury (part)
- Bicester and Woodstock (part)
- Witney (part)

== Results history ==
Primary data source: House of Commons research briefing - General election results from 1918 to 2019

=== 2024 ===
The number of votes cast for each political party who fielded candidates in constituencies comprising Oxfordshire in the 2019 general election were as follows:

Party	Votes	%	Change from 2019	Seats	Change from 2019
Liberal Democrats	117,151	34.7%	▲5.3%	5	▲4
Conservative	92,622	27.4%	▼19.2%	0	▼4
Labour	68,618	20.3%	▼0.5%	2	▲1
Reform	33,776	10.0%	▲9.5%	0	Steady
Greens	19,693	5.8%	▲3.6%	0	Steady
Others	10,350	3.1%	▲2.6%	0	Steady
Total	337,751	100.0		7	▲1

=== Percentage votes ===
Election year	1983	1987	1992	1997	2001	2005	2010	2015	2017	2019	2024
Liberal Democrat^{1}	29.3	26.6	23.5	24.7	27.3	29.0	28.0	12.8	18.1	29.4	34.7
Conservative	51.5	52.7	51.3	38.0	37.9	40.9	47.2	49.0	48.4	46.6	27.4
Labour	18.4	20.3	23.7	31.7	29.5	23.4	18.0	21.1	29.4	20.8	20.3
Reform^{2}	-	-	-	-	-	-	-	-	-	0.6	10.0
Green Party	-	*	*	*	*	*	2.5	6.2	2.1	2.2	5.8
UKIP	-	-	-	*	*	*	3.5	10.1	1.6	*	-
Other	0.8	0.4	1.5	5.6	5.3	6.8	0.8	0.9	0.4	0.6	3.1

^{1}pre-1979: Liberal Party; 1983 & 1987– SDP–Liberal Alliance ^{2}2019: Brexit Party

* Included in Other

=== Seats ===
Election year	1983	1987	1992	1997	2001	2005	2010	2015	2017	2019	2024
Liberal Democrat^{1}	0	0	0	1	1	1	0	0	1	1	5
Labour	0	1	1	1	1	1	1	1	1	1	2
Conservative	6	5	5	4	4	4	5	5	4	4	0
Total	6	6	6	6	6	6	6	6	6	6	7

^{1}1983 & 1987– SDP–Liberal Alliance

=== Maps ===
==== 1885-1910 ====
1885

1886

1892

1895

1900

1906

Jan 1910

Dec 1910

==== 1918-1945 ====
1918

1922

1923

1924

1929

1931

1935

1945

==== 1950-1979 ====
1950

1951

1955

1959

1964

1966

1970

Feb 1974

Oct 1974

1979

==== 1983-present ====
1983

1987

1992

1997

2001

2005

2010

2015

2017

2019

2024

== Historical representation by party ==
A cell marked → (with a different colour background to the preceding cell) indicates that the previous MP continued to sit under a new party name.

=== 1885 to 1918 ===
Conservative Liberal Liberal Unionist

Constituency	1885	1886	91	1892	95	1895	1900	1906	Jan 1910	Dec 1910	17	18
Banbury	Samuelson					A. Brassey		Twisleton-Wykeham-Fiennes	R. Brassey	Twisleton-Wykeham-Fiennes		Rhys-Williams
Henley	Harcourt	Parker				Hodge		P. Morrell	Fleming		Hermon-Hodge	
Oxford	Hall			Chesney	Annesley						Marriott	
Woodstock	Maclean	→	G. Morrell	Benson		G. Morrell		Bennett	Hamersley			

=== 1918 to 1983 ===
Coalition Liberal (1918–22) / National Liberal (1922-23) Conservative Labour Liberal

Constituency	1918	1922	1923	24	1924	1929	1931	32	1935	38	1945	1950	50	1951	1955	1959	1964	1966	1970	Feb 1974	Oct 1974	1979
Banbury	Rhys-Williams	Edmondson									Dodds-Parker					Marten						
Henley	Terrell				Henderson			Fox				Hay								Heseltine		
Oxford	Marriott	Gray		Bourne						Hogg			Turner			Woodhouse		Luard	Woodhouse		Luard	Patten
Oxfordshire Mid																				Hurd		

=== Since 1983 ===
Conservative Labour Liberal Democrats

Constituency	1983	1987	1992	1997	99	2001	05	2005	08	2010	2015	16	2017	2019	2024
Banbury	Baldry										Prentis				Woodcock
Henley / Henley & Thame (2024)	Heseltine					Johnson			Howell						Van Mierlo
Oxford East	Norris	Smith											Dodds		
Oxford West and Abingdon	Patten			Harris						Blackwood			Moran		
Wantage / Didcot & Wantage ('24)	Jackson						→	Vaizey						Johnston	Glover
Witney	Hurd			Woodward	→	Cameron						Courts			Maynard
Bicester and Woodstock															Miller

== See also ==
- List of parliamentary constituencies in the South East (region)
- History of parliamentary constituencies and boundaries in Oxfordshire
