= History of parliamentary constituencies and boundaries in Oxfordshire =

The ceremonial county of Oxfordshire has returned seven MPs to the UK Parliament since 2024.

As a result of the local government reorganisation introduced by the Local Government Act 1972, which came into effect on 1 April 1974, the boundaries of the historic/administrative county were altered to include northern parts of the county of Berkshire. This was reflected in the following redistribution of parliamentary seats which came into effect for the 1983 general election and effectively increased the county's representation from four to six MPs.

== Number of seats ==
The table below shows the number of MPs representing Oxfordshire at each major redistribution of seats affecting the county.

Year	County seats^{1}	Borough seats^{1}	Total
Prior to 1832	2	5	7
1832–1885	3	4	7
1885–1918	3	1	4
1918–1974	2	1	3
1974–1983	3	1	4
1983–2024	5	1	6
2024–present	6	1	7

^{1}Prior to 1950, seats were classified as County Divisions or Parliamentary Boroughs. Since 1950, they have been classified as County or Borough Constituencies.

== Timeline ==
County seat Borough seat

Constituency	Prior to 1832	1832–1885	1885–1918	1918–1974	1974–1983	1983–2024	2024–present
Oxfordshire	1290–1832 (2 MPs)	1832–1885 (3 MPs)					
Banbury	1553–1885		1885–present				
Woodstock^{1}	1553–1832 (2 MPs)	1832–1885	1885–1918				
Bicester and Woodstock							2024–present
Mid-Oxon					1974–1983		
Witney						1983–present	
Henley			1885–2024				
Henley and Thame							2024–present
Oxford	1295–1885 (2 MPs)		1885–1983				
Oxford East						1983–present	
Oxford West and Abingdon	Part of Berkshire prior to April 1974 (Abingdon)					1983–present	
Wantage	Part of Berkshire prior to April 1974 (Abingdon)					1983–2024	
Didcot and Wantage	Part of Berkshire prior to April 1974 (Abingdon)						2024–present

^{1}Formally known as New Woodstock prior to 1885

== Boundary reviews ==
Prior to 1832	Since 1290, the parliamentary county of Oxfordshire, along with all other English counties regardless of size or population, had elected two MPs (knights of the shire) to the House of Commons. The county also included the parliamentary boroughs of Oxford (partly in Berkshire) and New Woodstock both returning two MPs (burgesses) and Banbury (partly in Northamptonshire) which returned one MP (one of only a handful of English boroughs to do so).	
1832	The Reform Act 1832 radically changed the representation of the House of Commons. The county's representation was increased to three MPs, whilst that of New Woodstock was reduced to one MP.	
1885	Under the Redistribution of Seats Act 1885, the county was divided into three single-member constituencies, namely the Northern or Banbury Division, the Mid or Woodstock Division and the Southern or Henley Division. The boroughs of Banbury and Woodstock were abolished and absorbed into the county divisions which took their names and Oxford had its representation reduced to one MP.	Oxfordshire 1885–1918
1918	Under the Representation of the People Act 1918, Woodstock was abolished. Its contents were divided between the two other county seats, with western parts, including Witney and Woodstock, being transferred to Banbury, and eastern parts, including Bicester, to Henley. Caversham, to the north of Reading, had been absorbed by the county borough thereof and was now transferred from Henley to the constituency of Reading in Berkshire. The boundaries of Oxford were aligned to those of the county borough.	Oxfordshire 1918–1950
1950	The representation of the county was unchanged by the Representation of the People Act 1948. The boundaries of Oxford were expanded further to match the earlier expansion of the county borough, primarily into the Henley constituency to include the suburbs of Cowley and Headington.	Oxfordshire 1950–1974
1974	Under the Second Periodic Review of Westminster Constituencies, representation was increased back up to 4 MPs with the creation of the constituency of Mid Oxfordshire (formally known as Mid-Oxon). This was formed largely from the constituency of Banbury, incorporating the Urban and Rural Districts of Witney as well as the village of Kidlington, to the north of Oxford. It also included rural areas to the south of Bicester and the east of Oxford, transferred from Henley. Bicester and areas to the north were transferred from Henley to Banbury.	Oxfordshire 1974–1983
1983	The Third Periodic Review reflected the changes to Oxfordshire resulting from the Local Government Act 1972 and saw the county's representation increase from 4 to 6 MPs combined with major boundary changes. The bulk of the area comprising the constituency of Abingdon in Berkshire had been moved to Oxfordshire, with the majority of its contents, including Wantage, Wallingford, Didcot and Faringdon, being included in the new seat of Wantage. The town of Abingdon-on-Thames itself, together with areas to the west of Oxford, was included in the new constituency of Oxford West and Abingdon, along with western parts of the abolished constituency of Oxford, including the city centre. Eastern parts of Oxford (comprising the majority thereof) formed the new constituency of Oxford East, which also included further suburban areas transferred from Henley and Mid-Oxon. Mid-Oxon was abolished and largely replaced by the new constituency of Witney, which included Witney and Kidlington. Eastern, rural, areas were transferred to Banbury (parts in Cherwell District) and Henley (parts in South Oxfordshire District). Woodstock, Chipping Norton and surrounding rural areas were transferred from Banbury and added to Witney.	Oxfordshire 1983–1997
1997	The Fourth Review resulted in relatively few changes. They including the transfer of Kidlington from Witney to Oxford West and Abingdon, which in turn lost the South ward of the City of Oxford to Oxford East. Witney gained the two remaining wards of the West Oxfordshire District which had been included in Banbury in the previous review.	Oxfordshire 1997–2010
2010	At the Fifth Review the Boundary Commission for England retained Oxfordshire's 6 constituencies, with minor changes to realign constituency boundaries with those of current local government wards, and to reduce the electoral disparity between constituencies. They included the transfer of Oxford city centre from Oxford West and Abingdon to Oxford East.	Oxfordshire 2010–2024
2024	For the 2023 Periodic Review of Westminster constituencies, which redrew the constituency map ahead of the 2024 United Kingdom general election, the Boundary Commission for England increased the number of seats in Oxfordshire from six to seven, due to the electorates of all six existing constituencies being above the maximum allowed quota. This resulted in the formation of the new constituency of Bicester and Woodstock, incorporating the town of Bicester, transferred from Banbury, Kidlington from Oxford West and Abingdon, and Woodstock from Witney. To partly compensate for their losses, Oxford city centre was moved back from Oxford East to Oxford West and Abingdon, Chipping Norton was transferred from Witney to Banbury and Faringdon from Wantage (renamed Didcot and Wantage) to Witney. Other small changes to align with new ward boundaries. Henley renamed Henley and Thame.	Oxfordshire 2024–present

== See also ==
- List of parliamentary constituencies in Oxfordshire
