= Henley by-election =

Henley by-election may refer to any of three by-elections in the UK parliamentary constituency of Henley:

- 1917 Henley by-election
- 1932 Henley by-election
- 2008 Henley by-election
