= 2008 Henley by-election =

UK parliamentary by-election

- 26 June 2008

Constituency of Henley
- Turnout: 50.5%
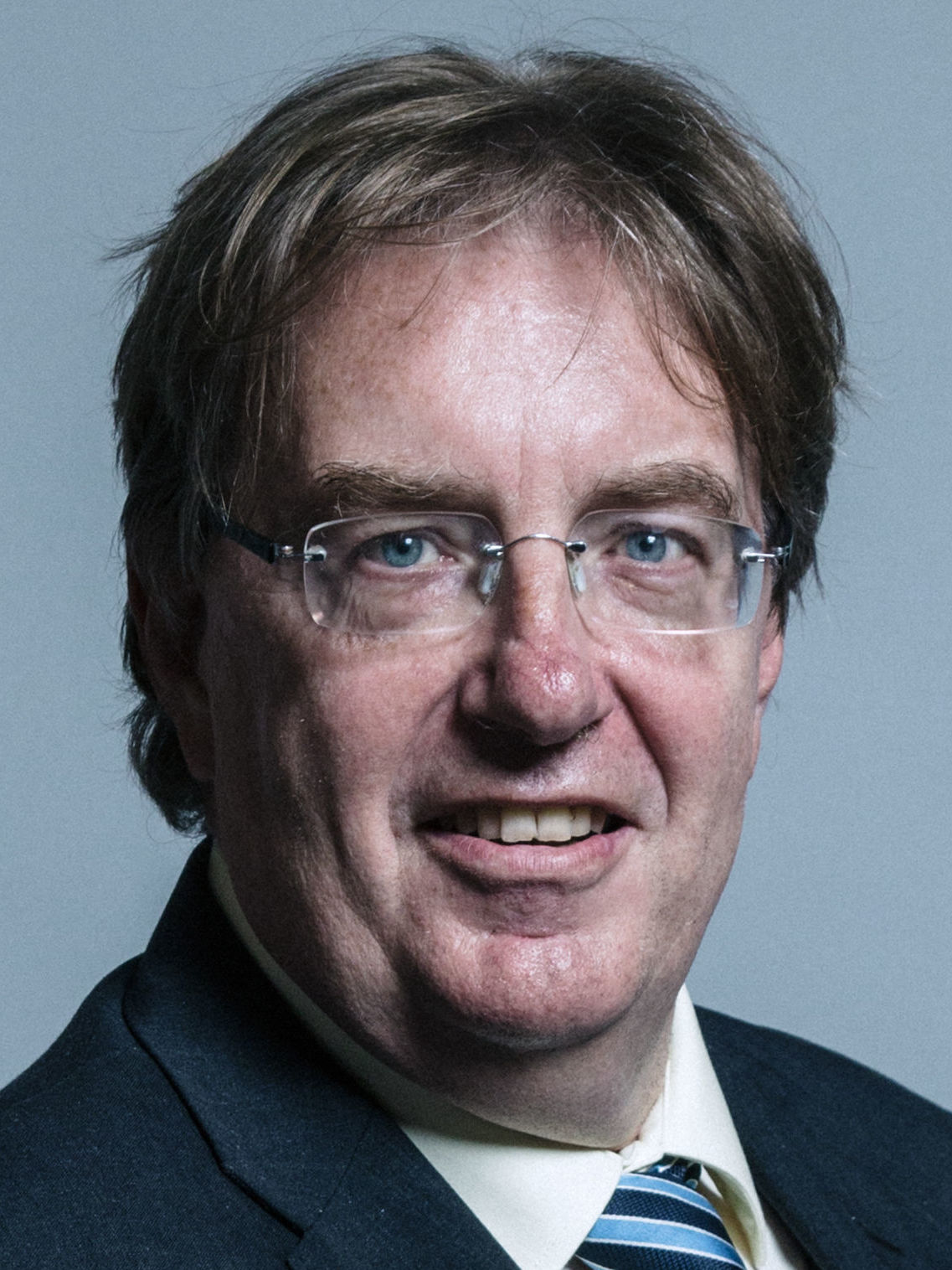
	First party	Second party
		LD
Candidate	John Howell	Stephen Kearney
Party	Conservative	Liberal Democrats
Popular vote	19,796	9,680
Percentage	56.9%	27.8%
Swing	▲3.4%	▲1.8%
MP before election
Boris Johnson
Conservative
Elected MP
John Howell
Conservative

A by-election for the United Kingdom parliamentary constituency of Henley was held on 26 June 2008, triggered by the resignation of incumbent Conservative Party MP Boris Johnson following his election as Mayor of London the previous month. The by-election was won comfortably by the Conservative candidate John Howell, who held the seat with an increased percentage of the vote. The governing Labour Party's vote fell by 11% and they finished fifth, losing their deposit.

== Background ==
Henley was considered a safe seat for the Conservative Party, having been held by the party continuously since 1910 up to this election. Johnson had gained a 12,793 majority over the Liberal Democrats at the previous election, though recent local elections had seen the Liberal Democrats' vote rise. Despite this, an easy win for the Conservative Party candidate was predicted, with the Labour Party being given little to no chance of victory. It had been expected that the by-election would be held after the parliamentary summer recess. However, following their victory in the Crewe and Nantwich by-election, the Conservatives brought the by-election forward to 26 June, in order to capitalise on their strong support.

== Candidates ==
For the 2010 general election, candidates had been chosen for the Labour and Liberal Democrat parties, but internal party rules may have required re-selection before any by-election was called.

Boris Johnson's father Stanley Johnson was widely expected to seek the Conservative Party's nomination. However, John Howell, an Oxfordshire county councillor, was selected as the Conservative candidate, in preference to Ann Ducker, leader of South Oxfordshire district council, and John Cotton, a South Oxfordshire district councillor.

The Liberal Democrats' candidate was Stephen Kearney, head of a development charity who had previously owned and ran a small business. The Liberal Democrats had previously selected Oxfordshire councillor Susan Cooper for the general election, but under Liberal Democrat policies, such selections are not valid for by-elections. When it became apparent a by-election was to be held, a new selection process was run.

The Labour candidate was Richard McKenzie, who was previously a local councillor in Reading, having lost his seat in the local council elections of May 2008.

The Green Party continued with its 2005 general election candidate Mark Stevenson.

The British National Party candidate, Tim Rait, previously stood for European Parliament election in 2004, for Maidenhead in the 2005 general election and the Lothians Region in the 2007 Scottish election.

The UK Independence Party selected Chris Adams, Buckinghamshire County Organiser for the UKIP and also PPC for Aylesbury. He previously stood in Aylesbury at the 2005 general election.

Following the candidature of the then-Miss Great Britain, Gemma Garrett, at the Crewe and Nantwich by-election in 2008, the "Beauties for Britain" group stood two candidates - one blonde, the other brunette - in Henley: Amanda Harrington and Louise Cole, respectively. However, the party was not registered with the Electoral Commission so they were considered Independent candidates.

The Monster Raving Loony Party fielded candidate Bananaman Owen, whose name was taken from a British television programme. The Harry Bear candidate is the fictional creation of Mail on Sunday columnist Richard Heller.

== Election result ==
Polling day was Thursday 26 June. The results were declared shortly after 0130 BST on Friday 27 June by the returning officer for South Oxfordshire council.

Henley by-election, 2008
Party	Candidate	Votes	%	±%
Conservative	John Howell	19,796	56.9	+3.4
Liberal Democrats	Stephen Kearney	9,680	27.8	+1.8
Green	Mark Stevenson	1,321	3.8	+0.5
BNP	Tim Rait	1,243	3.6	New
Labour	Richard McKenzie	1,066	3.1	–11.6
UKIP	Chris Adams	843	2.4	–0.1
Monster Raving Loony	Bananaman Owen	242	0.7	New
English Democrat	Derek Allpass	157	0.4	New
Independent	Amanda Harrington	128	0.4	New
Common Good	Dick Rodgers	121	0.3	New
Independent	Louise Cole	91	0.3	New
Fur Play Party	Harry Bear	73	0.2	New
Majority		10,116	29.1	+1.6
Turnout		34,761	50.5	–17.4
Conservative hold		Swing	+0.8	

== General election 2005 result ==
General election 2005: Henley
Party	Candidate	Votes	%	±%
Conservative	Boris Johnson	24,894	53.5	+7.4
Liberal Democrats	David Turner	12,101	26.0	–1.0
Labour	Kaleem Saeed	6,862	14.7	–6.4
Green	Mark Stevenson	1,518	3.3	+0.7
UKIP	Delphine Gray-Fisk	1,162	2.5	–0.7
Majority		12,793	27.5	+8.4
Turnout		46,537	67.9	+3.6
Conservative hold		Swing	+4.2	

== Campaign ==
The nature of campaign was seen as quite aggressive from both sides. The Liberal Democrats attacked both the green-belt credentials of the Conservative candidate and his participation in the campaign to save the local hospital, as well as producing leaflets which were alleged to imply that the previous MP, Boris Johnson backed their candidate and incorrectly asserted a local school's budget was under threat. The Conservatives in return threatened to sue, claiming the allegations of non-involvement were untrue and played on the fact that the Liberal Democrat candidate was not local, but from Plymouth. The Lib Dems responded by saying that their candidate had moved into the constituency and would remain there, the same way the former Conservative MP Boris Johnson had done when he stood.

Reaction from voters to the hard campaigning indicated that some constituents were turned off and some commentators raised questions on the effectiveness of the Liberal Democrat campaign after the results which saw an increased swing to the Conservatives.

== See also ==
- List of United Kingdom by-elections (1979–2010)
- 1932 Henley by-election
- 1917 Henley by-election
