= Fox baronets =

Extinct baronetcy in the Baronetage of the United Kingdom

The Fox Baronetcy, of Liverpool in the County Palatine of Lancaster, was a title in the Baronetage of the United Kingdom. It was created on 30 January 1924 for the philanthropist Gilbert Fox. The second Baronet sat as Conservative Member of Parliament for Henley. The title became extinct on his death in 1959.

== Fox baronets, of Liverpool (1924) ==
- Sir Gilbert Wheaton Fox, 1st Baronet (1863–1925)
- Sir Gifford Wheaton Grey Fox, 2nd Baronet (1903–1959)

== Arms ==
Coat of arms of Fox baronets

Crest
A demi-fox Proper resting the sinister paw on a rose as in the arms.
Escutcheon
Per chevron Azure and Or in chief two foxes' heads erased of the second and in base a rose Gules barbed and seeded Proper.
Motto
Vigila Et Aude
