= 1942 Maldon by-election =

1942 UK parliamentary by-election

← 1935	25 June 1942	1945 →

Constituency of Maldon
- Turnout: 44.4% (▼29.4%)
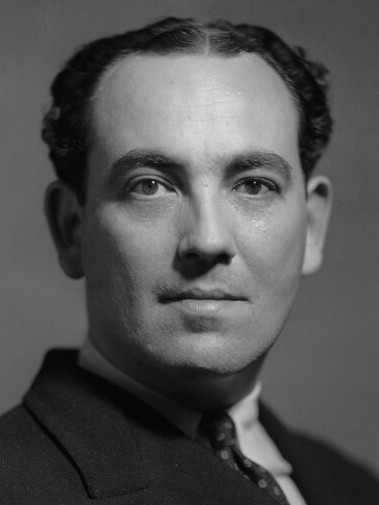

	First party	Second party	Third party
Candidate	Tom Driberg	R. J. Hunt	Richard Borlase Matthews
Party	Independent Labour	Conservative	National Independent and Agricultural
Popular vote	12,219	6,226	1,476
Percentage	61.3%	31.3%	7.4%
Swing	N/A	▼22.1%	N/A
MP before election
Edward Ruggles-Brise
Conservative
Elected MP
Tom Driberg
Independent Labour

The 1942 Maldon by-election was a parliamentary by-election held on 25 June 1942 for the British House of Commons constituency of Maldon in Essex. It was one a series of by-elections in World War II won by radical independent candidates.

== Previous MP ==
The seat had become vacant when the constituency's Conservative Member of Parliament (MP), Sir Edward Ruggles-Brise, had died on 12 May, aged 59. He had been Maldon's MP since the 1922 general election, with a brief interruption from 1923 to 1924.

== Candidates ==
During World War II, unopposed by-elections were common, since the major parties had agreed not to contest by-elections when vacancies arose in seats held by the other parties; contests occurred only when independent candidates or minor parties chose to stand.

The Conservative candidate in Maldon, R. J. Hunt, thus faced neither a Labour Party nor a Liberal candidate. However, the left-wing journalist Tom Driberg stood as an "Independent Labour" candidate. Driberg was well known as the Daily Express columnist "William Hickey" and had a home in Bradwell-on-Sea – the only candidate who lived in the constituency. He was a member of the "1941 Committee", a group of progressive intellectuals who met under the chairmanship of J. B. Priestley at the home of Edward G. Hulton, the owner of the Picture Post newspaper. At the start of May, the committee had published a "Nine-Point Plan" calling for works councils and the publication of "post-war plans for the provision of full and free education, employment and a civilized standard of living for everyone." The plan formed the basis of Driberg's campaign.

The third contestant was 64-year-old Borlase Matthews, standing as a National Independent and Agricultural candidate. He was Liberal candidate at Henley in the 1931 general election, in the 1932 Henley by-election, at Ashford for the 1935 general election, and at the 1937 Tonbridge by-election. He was an engineer but left engineering to take up farming. He was a Member of the Council of the Royal Agricultural Society. He was a Member of the Electricity Commissioners Rural Electrification Conference. He was Chairman of the Rural Reconstruction Association. He was also an author of several books and papers on farming. Matthews supported Churchill's Coalition government but felt that it was too dominated by the Conservatives and wanted it to be more progressive in nature.

== Result ==
On a much-reduced turnout, the result was a massive victory for Driberg, who won 61.3% of the votes. Ruggles-Brise had held the seat at the 1935 general election with 53.4% of the votes, a majority of 24.5%; but Hunt won only 31.3%.

Driberg sat as an Independent Labour MP until January 1945, when he took the Labour Whip in the House of Commons. As a Labour Party candidate, he held the seat comfortably at the 1945 general election, and remained Maldon's MP until he stepped down at the 1955 election.

The rejection of the government candidate was widely linked to the Axis capture of Tobruk only a few days beforehand, the latest in a string of British defeats, although Driberg denied that this had been a major factor.

== Previous election ==
General election, 1935: Maldon
Party	Candidate	Votes	%	±%
Conservative	Edward Ruggles-Brise	17,072	53.4	−17.4
Labour	W. F. Toynbee	9,264	28.9	−0.3
Liberal	Hilda Buckmaster	5,680	17.7	New
Majority		7,808	24.5	−16.1
Turnout		32,016	73.8	−0.9
Conservative hold		Swing		

== Result of by-election ==
Maldon by-election, 25 June 1942
Party	Candidate	Votes	%	±%
Independent Labour	Tom Driberg	12,219	61.3	New
Conservative	R. J. Hunt	6,226	31.3	−22.1
National Independent and Agricultural	Richard Borlase Matthews	1,476	7.4	New
Majority		5,993	30.0	N/A
Turnout		19,921	44.4	−29.4
Independent Labour gain from Conservative		Swing		

== Aftermath ==
General election, 1945: Maldon
Party	Candidate	Votes	%	±%
Labour	Tom Driberg	22,480	60.4	−0.9
Conservative	Melford Stevenson	14,753	39.6	+6.3
Majority		7,727	20.8	−9.2
Turnout		37,233	74.5	+30.1
Labour gain from Independent Labour		Swing		

== See also ==
- Maldon constituency
- Maldon
- Lists of United Kingdom by-elections
- United Kingdom by-election records
