= Bicester and Woodstock =

UK Parliament constituency (since 2024)

Coordinates: 51.87°N 1.25°W

Bicester & Woodstock
- County constituency for the House of Commons
- Boundaries since 2024
- Boundary of Bicester and Woodstock in South East England
- County: Oxfordshire
- Electorate: 70,389 (2020)
- Major settlements: Bicester, Kidlington and Woodstock

Current constituency
- Created: 2024
- Member of Parliament: Calum Miller (Liberal Democrats)
- Seats: One
- Created from: Banbury (part), Henley (part), Oxford West & Abingdon (part), Witney (part)

Bicester and Woodstock is a constituency of the House of Commons in the UK Parliament. It was created as part of the 2023 Periodic Review of Westminster constituencies, being first contested at the 2024 general election. The incumbent Member of Parliament is Calum Miller of the Liberal Democrats.

== Constituency profile ==
The Bicester and Woodstock constituency is located in Oxfordshire and covers parts of the Cherwell and West Oxfordshire local government districts. It is predominantly rural and agricultural and contains the towns and villages lying to the north of Oxford. The largest settlement in the constituency is the market town of Bicester with a population of around 37,000. Other settlements include the small towns of Woodstock and Kidlington and the village of Yarnton.

Bicester is a historic town and is home to Bicester Village, a popular tourist and retail destination. Residents of the constituency have a similar ethnic makeup to the country as a whole and are considerably wealthier than the national average. Both Bicester and the constituency's rural areas elected primarily Liberal Democrat councillors at the most recent local council elections in 2024. The constituency is estimated to have voted marginally in favour of remaining in the European Union in the 2016 referendum.

== Boundaries ==
The constituency is composed of the following (as they existed on 1 December 2020):

- The District of Cherwell wards of: Bicester East; Bicester North & Caversfield; Bicester South & Ambrosden; Bicester West; Fringford & Heyfords; Kidlington East; Kidlington West; Launton & Otmoor.
- The District of West Oxfordshire wards of: Eynsham and Cassington; Freeland and Hanborough; North Leigh; Stonesfield and Tackley; Woodstock and Bladon.

It comprises the following areas:

- The town of Bicester, transferred from Banbury
- The large village of Kidlington, transferred from Oxford West and Abingdon
- Largely rural areas, including the small market town of Woodstock, transferred from Witney
- A small rural area transferred from Henley

== Members of Parliament ==
Banbury, Witney, Oxford West & Abingdon and Henley prior to 2024

Election	Member	Party
2024	Calum Miller	Liberal Democrats

== Elections ==
=== Elections in the 2020s ===
General election 2024: Bicester and Woodstock
Party	Candidate	Votes	%	±%
Liberal Democrats	Calum Miller	19,419	38.7	▲12.1
Conservative	Rupert Harrison	14,461	28.8	▼25.1
Labour	Veronica Oakeshott	8,236	16.4	▼0.5
Reform	Augustine Obodo	5,408	10.8	▲10.5
Green	Ian Middleton	2,404	4.8	▲2.4
SDP	Tim Funnell	291	0.6	new
Majority		4,958	9.9	
Turnout		50,219	67.5	▼6.4
Registered electors		74,350		
Liberal Democrats gain from Conservative		Swing	▲18.6	

=== Elections in the 2010s ===
2019 notional result
Party	Vote	%
Conservative	28,030	53.9
Liberal Democrats	13,825	26.6
Labour	8,762	16.9
Green	1,225	2.4
Brexit Party	149	0.3
Turnout	51,991	73.9
Electorate	70,389	

== See also ==
- List of parliamentary constituencies in Oxfordshire
- List of parliamentary constituencies in the South East England (region)
