= Freddie van Mierlo =

British politician

Freddie van Mierlo MP
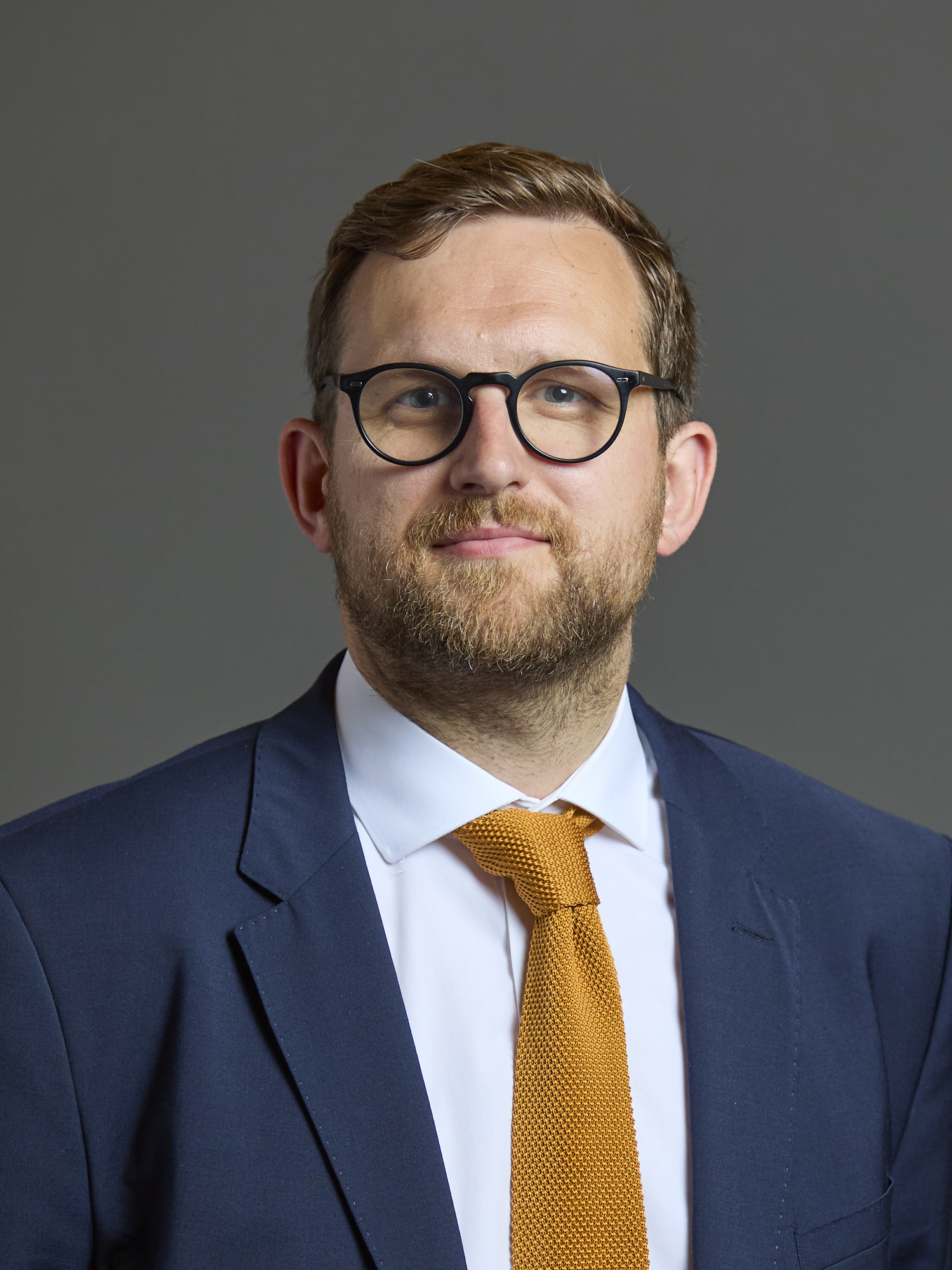
- Official portrait, 2024

Member of Parliament for Henley and Thame
- Incumbent
- Assumed office 4 July 2024
- Preceded by: Constituency established
- Majority: 6,267 (11.8%)

Member of Oxfordshire County Council for Chalgrove and Watlington
- In office 10 May 2021 – 11 March 2025
- Preceded by: Steve Harrod

Member of South Oxfordshire District Council for Watlington
- In office 8 May 2023 – 11 March 2025

Personal details
- Born: Frederick Isaac van Mierlo; 1989 or 1990 (age 35–36)
- Party: Liberal Democrats
- Education: University of Bristol (BSc); Leiden University (MA); Joseph Fourier University

Frederick Isaac van Mierlo (born 1989 or 1990) is a British Liberal Democrat politician who has been Member of Parliament (MP) for Henley and Thame since 2024. He was also a member of Oxfordshire County Council from 2021 until 2025 and South Oxfordshire District Council from 2023 until 2025. Before his election to Parliament, van Mierlo worked as a consultant to companies and patient groups.

== Early life and education ==
Van Mierlo grew up in Preston, Lancashire. His father moved to England from the Netherlands to work as a physiotherapist. He has a Bachelor of Science (BSc) degree in geographical sciences from the University of Bristol and a Master of Arts (MA) degree in European Union studies from Leiden University in the Netherlands, and also studied geographical sciences at Joseph Fourier University in Grenoble, France.

== Career ==
Van Mierlo lived and worked in Belgium before moving to South Oxfordshire in 2020. He was a director at the strategy consultancy Harwood Levitt Consulting, and worked as a consultant to companies, NGOs, foundations and patient groups.

In the 2019 European Parliament election in the United Kingdom, van Mierlo was on the Liberal Democrat party list for North West England. Since the 2021 election, van Mierlo has been a member of the Oxfordshire County Council for the division of Chalgrove and Watlington, and since the 2023 election a member of South Oxfordshire District Council for the ward of Watlington. He served as South Oxfordshire's cabinet member for climate change and nature recovery from 2023 to 2024.

Van Mierlo stood as a Liberal Democrat parliamentary candidate in the Lancashire constituency of Fylde at the 2015 and 2017 general elections. He was elected as Member of Parliament for Henley and Thame in the 2024 general election, receiving 45.0 per cent of the vote, with a majority of 6,267 over the second-placed Conservative candidate. Its predecessor constituency of Henley had been held by the Conservatives for 114 years, since the January 1910 general election.

== Personal life ==
Van Mierlo lives in Henley-on-Thames with his wife and daughter. He is a distant relative of Hans van Mierlo, a co-founder of the Dutch liberal party Democrats 66.

Parliament of the United Kingdom
New constituency	Member of Parliament for Henley and Thame; 2024–present	Incumbent
