= Oxford East =

UK Parliament constituency (since 1983)

Coordinates: 51.75°N 1.21°W

- Borough constituency for the House of Commons
- Boundaries since 2024
- Boundary of Oxford East in South East England
- County: Oxfordshire
- Electorate: 72,371 (2023)

Current constituency
- Created: 1983
- Member of Parliament: Anneliese Dodds (Labour Co-op)
- Seats: One
- Created from: Oxford (majority) (abolished); Mid Oxfordshire; Henley

Oxford East is a constituency (Note: A borough constituency (for the purposes of election expenses and type of returning officer)) represented in the House of Commons of the UK Parliament since 2017 by Anneliese Dodds of the Labour Party.

Created in 1983, the constituency covers the eastern and southern parts of Oxford in Oxfordshire. It borders Oxford West and Abingdon to the west and Henley and Thame to the north, east and south.

== Constituency profile ==
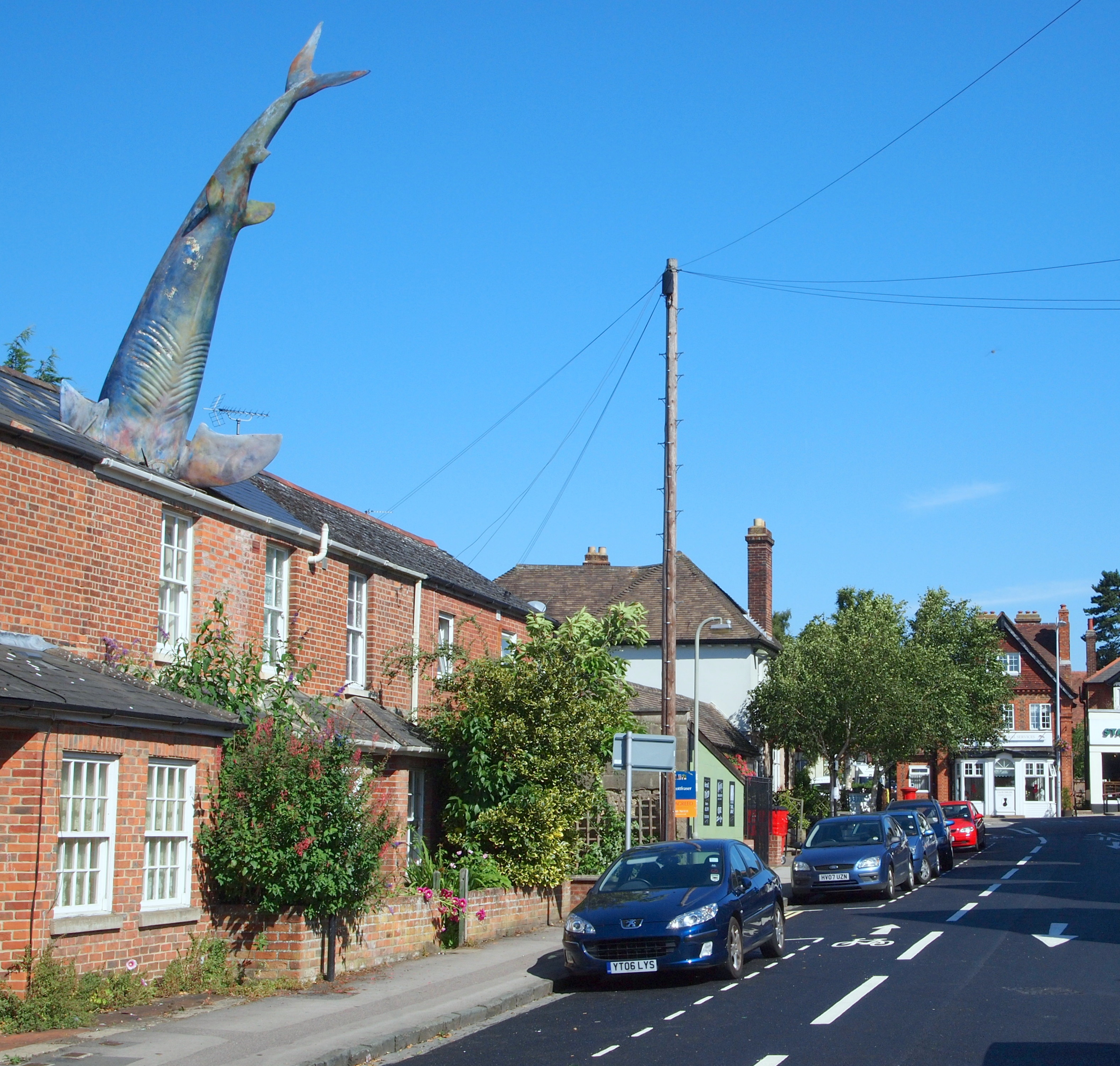
Suburban Headington, including the Headington Shark

Oxford East is a constituency in Oxfordshire in South East England. It covers the southern and eastern neighbourhoods of the city of Oxford, including New Hinksey, St Clement's, Cowley, Iffley, Blackbird Leys, Headington, Barton and Marston.

Oxford is a cathedral city and popular tourist destination known for its university, one of the oldest in the world, and its historic architecture. This constituency does not include the city centre and instead covers most of Oxford's suburbs, which were largely developed in the early 20th century. This constituency includes Oxford Brookes University, which has around 26,000 students. The city's two major hospitals (John Radcliffe and Churchill) and the BMW Plant Oxford car factory in Cowley are located in Oxford East and are significant local employers.

The northern suburbs like Headington and Marston are highly affluent, whilst there is some deprivation in the southern neighbourhoods like Blackbird Leys which contain a large quantity of post-war council housing. House prices across the constituency are generally higher than the regional and UK averages.

Oxford East has a large population of students and young adults and a low proportion of retirees. Residents have above-average levels of income but low rates of homeownership, and the child poverty rate is below-average. Residents are generally well-educated and a high proportion work in the health and education sectors. The percentage claiming unemployment benefits is low.

White people made up 69% of the Oxford East population at the 2021 census, around a quarter of whom were of non-British origin including large Portuguese and Polish communities. Asians, mostly of Indian or Pakistani origin, were the largest ethnic minority group at 16%. Black people made up 6% of residents.

At the local council level, St Clement's and Cowley are mostly represented by Green Party and independent councillors whilst the other suburbs elected Labour Party and some Liberal Democrat representatives. Voters in Oxford East strongly supported remaining in the European Union in the 2016 referendum; an estimated 67% voted to remain compared to the UK-wide rate of 48%.

== History ==
From 1885 until 1983 the vast bulk of the area of the seat, as it has variously been drawn since 1983, was in the abolished Oxford constituency, historically Liberal then for some decades Conservative, and which then alternated with the Labour Party, who took that seat in the late 1960s and late 1970s.

For the first four years (from 1983) Oxford East was served by Conservative Steven Norris. He was defeated by Labour candidate Andrew Smith who held the seat for the next 30 years before retiring. The Conservative share of the vote fell to a low to date, of 16.7%, in 2005, a year when the seat became an emphatic Labour–Liberal Democrat contest, and the votes for Andrew Smith were only 963 more than the "Lib Dem" candidate: a majority of 2.3% of the votes (electorate voting).

Smith held the seat in 2015 with a much increased majority; it was the 80th-safest of Labour's 232 seats won that year by percentage of majority. On his retirement the local Labour party selected Anneliese Dodds. At the 2017 general election she took the seat with a majority of 23,284 votes (43.2%) – reduced to 17,832 (36.1%) in 2019. From 2015 the runner-up returned to being a Conservative.

The Green Party's candidate has stood in all eight contests since the party was branded as such, twice retaining its deposit, in 2015, with almost 12% of the vote, and in 2024.

Ousted ex-MP Norris won the largest runner-up's share of the vote to date (40.4%) during the 1987 general election. Turnout has ranged between 78.9% in 1987 and 55.8% in 2001.

== Boundaries and boundary changes ==
=== 1983–1997 ===
- The City of Oxford wards of Blackbird Leys, East, Headington, Iffley, Marston, Quarry, St Clement's, Temple Cowley, and Wood Farm; and
- The District of South Oxfordshire wards of Littlemore, Marston, and Risinghurst.

The constituency was formed largely from the majority of the abolished Borough Constituency of Oxford. it also included three wards in the District of South Oxfordshire, previously part of Henley (Littlemore) and the abolished constituency of Mid-Oxon (Marston and Risinghurst).

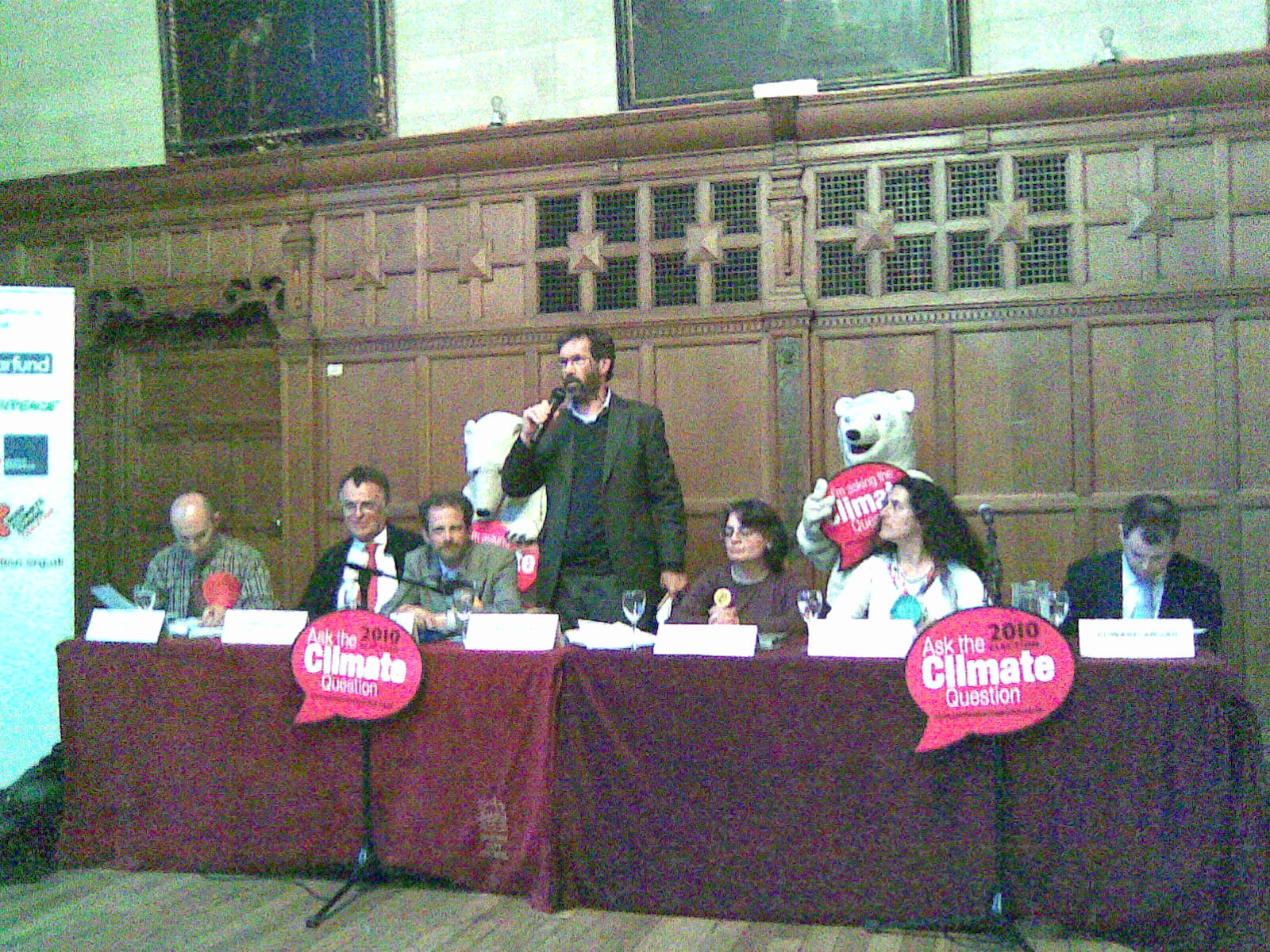
Oxford East candidates in the 2010 general election at a climate change hustings

=== 1997–2010 ===
- The City of Oxford wards of Blackbird Leys, East, Headington, Iffley, Littlemore, Marston, Old Marston and Risinghurst, Quarry, St Clement's, South, Temple Cowley, and Wood Farm.

The 1997 boundary changes reflected changes to local government boundaries with the majority of the area comprising the three South Oxfordshire wards having been absorbed into the City of Oxford. The remaining, semi-rural Conservative-leaning areas were transferred back to Henley. The urban City of Oxford South ward, which was strong for the Liberal Democrats and Labour, was transferred from Oxford West and Abingdon.

=== 2010–2024 ===
Map of 2010–2024 boundaries

- The City of Oxford wards of Barton and Sandhills, Blackbird Leys, Carfax, Churchill, Cowley, Cowley Marsh, Headington, Headington Hill and Northway, Hinksey Park, Holywell, Iffley Fields, Littlemore, Lye Valley, Marston, Northfield Brook, Quarry and Risinghurst, Rose Hill and Iffley, St Clement's, and St Mary's.

Under the fifth periodic review of Westminster constituencies the constituency was slightly altered, in order to equalise electorates and take account of changes to the City's ward structure. These changes added Carfax and Holywell wards from Oxford West and Abingdon; this meant that Oxford city centre and the majority of Oxford colleges, which had previously been mainly in Oxford West and Abingdon, now fell into Oxford East.

=== 2024–present ===
Further to the 2023 review of Westminster constituencies, which came into effect for the 2024 general election, the constituency is composed of the following (as they existed on 1 December 2020):

- The City of Oxford wards of: Barton & Sandhills; Blackbird Leys; Churchill; Cowley; Donnington; Headington; Headington Hill & Northway; Hinksey Park; Littlemore; Lye Valley; Marston; Northfield Brook; Quarry & Risinghurst; Rose Hill & Iffley; St. Clement’s; St. Mary’s; Temple Cowley.

The electorate was reduced to bring it within the permitted range by transferring areas to the west of the River Cherwell, including the city centre and Oxford University colleges, back to Oxford West and Abingdon.

== Members of Parliament ==
Election	Member	Party
1983	Steven Norris	Conservative
1987	Andrew Smith	Labour
2017	Anneliese Dodds	Labour Co-op

== Elections ==
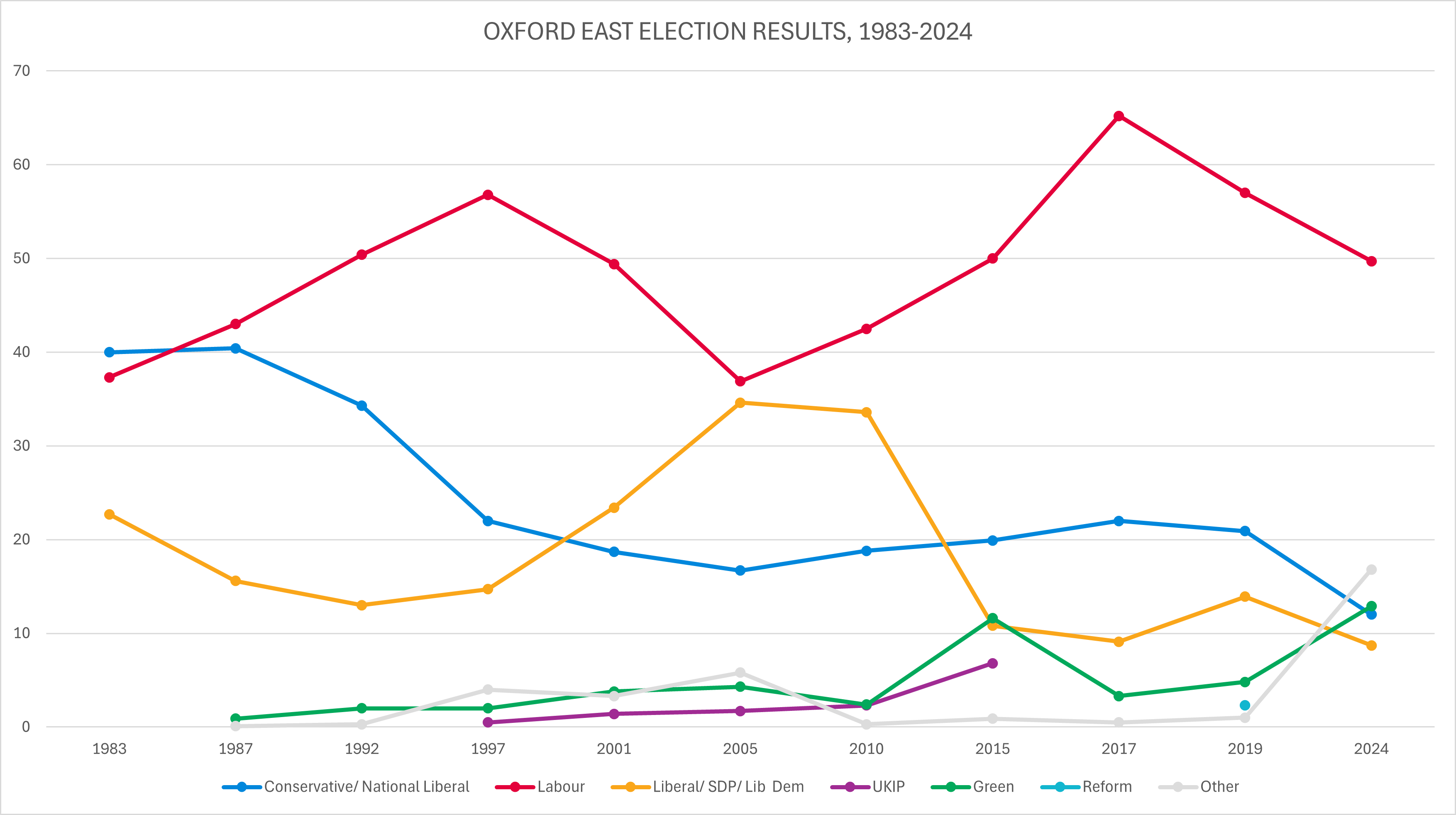
Election results 1983-2024

=== Elections in the 2020s ===
General election 2024: Oxford East
Party	Candidate	Votes	%	±%
Labour Co-op	Anneliese Dodds	19,541	49.7	−6.7
Green	Sushila Dhall	5,076	12.9	+8.2
Conservative	Louise Brown	4,739	12.0	−9.4
Liberal Democrats	Theodore Jupp	3,437	8.7	−5.3
IOA	David Henwood	2,381	6.1	N/A
Independent	Amir Ali	1,761	4.5	N/A
Workers Party	Zaid Marham	615	1.6	N/A
Independent	Jabu Nala-Hartley	600	1.5	N/A
Rejoin EU	Andrew Smith	425	1.1	N/A
Party of Women	Katherine Longthorp	337	0.9	N/A
SDP	Benjamin Adams	232	0.6	N/A
Workers Revolutionary	Brandon French	197	0.5	N/A
Majority		14,465	36.8	+1.8
Turnout		39,341	54.0	–9.0
Registered electors		71,845		
Labour Co-op hold		Swing	▼7.5	

=== Elections in the 2010s ===
2019 notional result
Party	Vote	%
Labour	25,738	56.4
Conservative	9,779	21.4
Liberal Democrats	6,391	14.0
Green	2,143	4.7
Brexit Party	1,048	2.3
Others	499	1.1
Turnout	45,598	63.0
Electorate	72,371	

General election 2019: Oxford East
Party	Candidate	Votes	%	±%
Labour Co-op	Anneliese Dodds	28,135	57.0	▼8.2
Conservative	Louise Staite	10,303	20.9	▼1.1
Liberal Democrats	Alistair Fernie	6,884	13.9	▲4.8
Green	David Williams	2,392	4.8	▲1.5
Brexit Party	Roger Carter	1,146	2.3	New
Independent	David Henwood	238	0.5	New
Independent	Chaka Artwell	143	0.3	▼0.2
Independent	Phil Taylor	118	0.2	New
Majority		17,832	36.1	▼7.1
Turnout		49,359	63.3	▼5.5
Labour Co-op hold		Swing	▼3.6	

General election 2017: Oxford East
Party	Candidate	Votes	%	±%
Labour Co-op	Anneliese Dodds	35,118	65.2	▲15.2
Conservative	Suzanne Bartington	11,834	22.0	▲2.1
Liberal Democrats	Kirsten Johnson	4,904	9.1	▼1.7
Green	Larry Sanders	1,785	3.3	▼8.3
Independent	Chaka Artwell	255	0.5	▲0.2
Majority		23,284	43.2	▲13.1
Turnout		53,896	68.8	▲4.6
Labour Co-op hold		Swing	▲6.5	

General election 2015: Oxford East
Party	Candidate	Votes	%	±%
Labour	Andrew Smith	25,356	50.0	+7.5
Conservative	Melanie Magee	10,076	19.9	+1.1
Green	Ann Duncan	5,890	11.6	+9.2
Liberal Democrats	Alasdair Murray	5,453	10.8	−22.8
UKIP	Ian Macdonald	3,451	6.8	+4.5
Independent	Chaka Artwell	160	0.3	New
Monster Raving Loony	Mad Hatter	145	0.3	New
TUSC	James Morbin	108	0.2	New
Socialist (GB)	Kevin Parkin	50	0.1	New
Majority		15,280	30.1	+21.2
Turnout		50,689	64.2	+1.1
Labour hold		Swing		

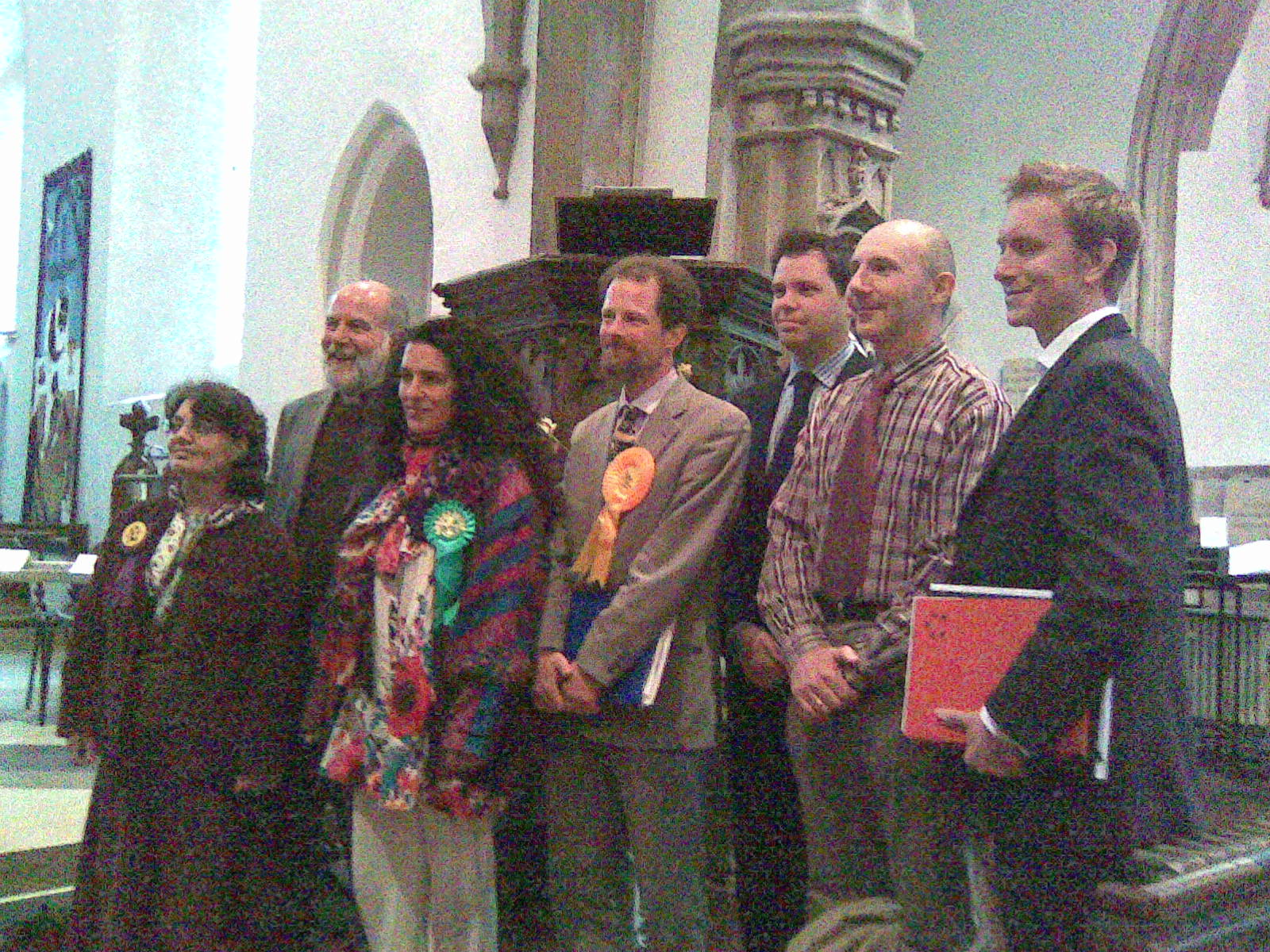
Oxford East parliamentary election 2010 candidates (Andrew Smith represented by a colleague) with hustings chair the Very Revd Bob Wilkes

General election 2010: Oxford East
Party	Candidate	Votes	%	±%
Labour	Andrew Smith	21,938	42.5	+6.5
Liberal Democrats	Steve Goddard	17,357	33.6	−1.6
Conservative	Edward Argar	9,727	18.8	+1.5
Green	Sushila Dhall	1,238	2.4	−2.1
UKIP	Julia Gasper	1,202	2.3	+0.6
Socialist Equality	David O'Sullivan	116	0.2	New
Equal Parenting Alliance	Roger Crawford	73	0.1	New
Majority		4,581	8.9	+6.6
Turnout		51,651	63.1	+5.6
Labour hold		Swing	+2.45	

=== Elections in the 2000s ===
General election 2005: Oxford East
Party	Candidate	Votes	%	±%
Labour	Andrew Smith	15,405	36.9	−12.5
Liberal Democrats	Steve Goddard	14,442	34.6	+11.2
Conservative	Virginia Morris	6,992	16.7	−2.0
Green	Jacob Sanders	1,813	4.3	+0.5
Independent ('New Loony')	Honest Blair	1,485	3.6	New
Ind. Working Class	Maurice Leen	892	2.1	New
UKIP	Peter Gardner	715	1.7	+0.3
Independent	Pathmanathan Mylvaganam	46	0.1	−0.1
Majority		963	2.3	−23.7
Turnout		41,790	57.9	+2.1
Labour hold		Swing	−11.8	

General election 2001: Oxford East
Party	Candidate	Votes	%	±%
Labour	Andrew Smith	19,681	49.4	−7.4
Liberal Democrats	Steve Goddard	9,337	23.4	+8.7
Conservative	Cheryl Potter	7,446	18.7	−3.3
Green	Pritam Singh	1,501	3.8	+1.8
Socialist Alliance	John Lister	708	1.8	New
UKIP	Peter Gardner	570	1.4	+0.9
Socialist Labour	Fahim Ahmed	274	0.7	New
ProLife Alliance	Linda Hodge	254	0.6	−0.1
Independent	Pathmanathan Mylvaganam	77	0.2	0.0
Majority		10,344	26.0	−8.8
Turnout		39,848	55.8	−12.6
Labour hold		Swing		

=== Elections in the 1990s ===
General election 1997: Oxford East
Party	Candidate	Votes	%	±%
Labour	Andrew Smith	27,205	56.8	+6.6
Conservative	Jonathan Djanogly	10,540	22.0	−11.5
Liberal Democrats	George Kershaw	7,038	14.7	+0.7
Referendum	John Young	1,391	2.9	New
Green	Craig Simmons	975	2.0	0.0
ProLife Alliance	David Harper-Jones	318	0.7	New
UKIP	Peter Gardner	234	0.5	New
Natural Law	John Thompson	108	0.2	New
Independent Anti-majority Democracy	Pathmanathan Mylvaganam	68	0.2	New
Majority		16,665	34.8	+18.1
Turnout		47,877	68.4	−5.8
Labour hold		Swing	+9.1	

General election 1992: Oxford East
Party	Candidate	Votes	%	±%
Labour	Andrew Smith	23,702	50.4	+7.4
Conservative	Mark Mayall	16,164	34.3	−6.1
Liberal Democrats	Martin Horwood	6,105	13.0	−2.6
Green	Caroline Lucas	933	2.0	+1.1
Natural Law	Ann Wilson	101	0.2	New
Revolutionary Communist	Keith Thompson	48	0.1	New
Majority		7,538	16.1	+13.5
Turnout		47,053	74.6	−4.3
Labour hold		Swing	+6.8	

=== Elections in the 1980s ===
General election 1987: Oxford East
Party	Candidate	Votes	%	±%
Labour	Andrew Smith	21,103	43.0	+5.7
Conservative	Steven Norris	19,815	40.4	+0.4
Liberal	Margaret Godden	7,648	15.6	−7.1
Green	Dave Dalton	441	0.9	New
Independent	Pathmanathan Mylvaganam	60	0.1	New
Majority		1,288	2.6	N/A
Turnout		49,067	78.9	+5.0
Labour gain from Conservative		Swing	+2.7	

General election 1983: Oxford East
Party	Candidate	Votes	%	±%
Conservative	Steven Norris	18,808	40.0	
Labour	Andrew Smith	17,541	37.3	
Liberal	Margaret Godden	10,690	22.7	
Majority		1,267	2.7	
Turnout		47,039	73.9	
Conservative win (new seat)				

== See also ==
- Parliamentary constituencies in Oxfordshire
- List of parliamentary constituencies in the South East England (region)
- Boundary Commission for England
  - Fifth periodic review of Westminster constituencies
  - First-past-the-post voting
  - History of local government in England
  - Rural districts
  - Urban districts

== Sources ==
- Election result 2015
- Election result, 2015 (BBC)
- Election result, 2010 (BBC)
- Election result, 2005 (BBC)
- Election results, 1997–2001 (BBC)
- Election results, 1997–2001 (Election Demon)
- Election results, 1983–1992 (Election Demon)
