= R. Henry Rew =

British agricultural statistician

Sir Henry Rew

Sir Robert Henry Rew KCB (4 August 1858 – 7 April 1929) was a British agricultural statistician. He had a long career in public service and was a prominent member of the Royal Statistical Society serving as its President from 1920–22.

== Life ==
He was the son of Robert Rew (1835–1917), a Congregational minister in Somerset and Buxton. In 1890 Rew became Secretary of the Central Chamber of Agriculture. He was secretary of the Royal Statistical Society from 1902 to 1920, and their Guy Medallist in 1905.

At the beginning of World War I, in November 1914, Rew was put in charge of the government's Grain Supplies Committee, which he chaired to 1916.

Rew was knighted as a Knight Commander of the Order of the Bath in 1916. He stood twice for the Liberals in Henley (UK Parliament constituency) in 1922 and 1923 but lost on both occasions to Conservative Reginald Terrell.

== Works ==
- Stack Ensilage (1888)
- An Agricultural Faggot: a Collection of Papers on Agricultural Subjects (1913)
- 1917, a chapter on wheat supply in a new edition of The Wheat Problem by William Crookes, publication subsidised by Lord Rhondda. Wartime conditions allowed Rew to reinforce the original message of Crookes, on the connection of food security and chemistry.

Rew was an Assistant Commissioner of the Royal Commission on Agricultural Depression from 1894. He produced reports on Norfolk and Dorset in 1895.
