= Francis Parker (UK politician) =

British politician (1851–1931)

The Hon. Francis Parker (1851–1931) was a Conservative Party member of the Parliament of the United Kingdom for Henley from 15 July 1886 to 24 July 1895.

Parker was a younger son of Thomas Parker, 6th Earl of Macclesfield.

Parliament of the United Kingdom
Preceded by Edward Vernon Harcourt	Member of Parliament for Henley; 1886–1895	Succeeded by Robert Hermon-Hodge
