= Anneliese Dodds =

British politician (born 1978)

The Right Honourable Dame Anneliese Dodds DBE MP
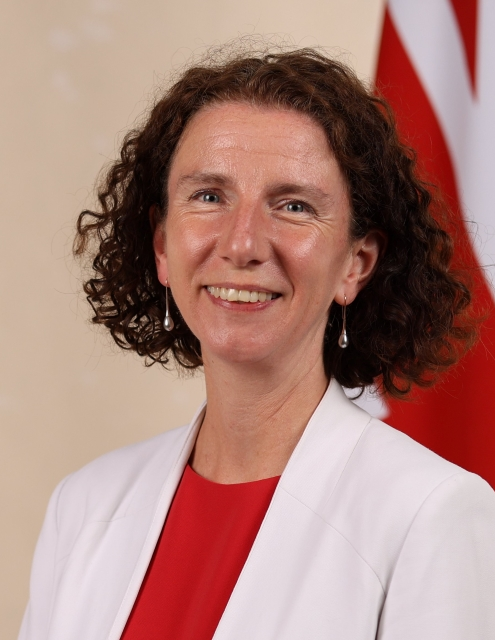
- Official portrait, 2024

Minister of State for Development
- In office 8 July 2024 – 28 February 2025
- Prime Minister: Keir Starmer
- Preceded by: Andrew Mitchell
- Succeeded by: The Baroness Chapman of Darlington

Minister of State for Women and Equalities
- In office 8 July 2024 – 28 February 2025
- Prime Minister: Keir Starmer
- Preceded by: Stuart Andrew (Equalities); Maria Caulfield (Women)
- Succeeded by: The Baroness Smith of Malvern

Chair of the Labour Party
- In office 9 May 2021 – 6 July 2024
- Leader: Keir Starmer
- Preceded by: Angela Rayner
- Succeeded by: Ellie Reeves
Shadow portfolios 2017–2024
Shadow Cabinet portfolios
2021–2024	Shadow Secretary of State for Women and Equalities
2020–2021	Shadow Chancellor of the Exchequer
Junior Shadow portfolios
2017–2020	Shadow Financial Secretary to the Treasury

Member of Parliament for Oxford East
- Incumbent
- Assumed office 8 June 2017
- Preceded by: Andrew Smith
- Majority: 14,465 (36.8%)

Member of the European Parliament for South East England
- In office 1 July 2014 – 8 June 2017
- Preceded by: Peter Skinner
- Succeeded by: John Howarth

Personal details
- Born: Anneliese Jane Dodds; 16 March 1978 (age 48) Aberdeen, Scotland
- Party: Labour Co-op
- Domestic partner: Ed Turner
- Children: 2
- Education: St. Hilda's College, Oxford (BA); University of Edinburgh (MA); London School of Economics (PhD)
- Website: Official website

Dame Anneliese Jane Dodds DBE (born 16 March 1978) is a British Labour and Co-operative politician and public policy analyst who served as Minister of State for Development and Minister of State for Women and Equalities from July 2024 to February 2025. She previously served as Chair of the Labour Party from 2021 to 2024. She has been Member of Parliament (MP) for Oxford East since 2017 and was a Member of the European Parliament (MEP) for South East England from 2014 to 2017.

After joining the Labour Party, Dodds contested Billericay unsuccessfully at the 2005 general election and Reading East at the 2010 general election. Dodds was elected to the European Parliament at the 2014 European Parliament election. She resigned her South East England seat when she was elected to the House of Commons at the 2017 general election.

She served in the Shadow Treasury Team of Shadow Chancellor John McDonnell as Shadow Financial Secretary to the Treasury from 2017 to 2020. In this role, she supported calls for a confirmatory referendum on Britain's withdrawal from the European Union. In April 2020, she was appointed Shadow Chancellor of the Exchequer by new Labour leader Keir Starmer. She was demoted from the role in a reshuffle after the 2021 local elections, and appointed Chair of the Party and Policy Review. She gained the additional Shadow Women and Equalities Secretary brief in September 2021, following Marsha de Cordova's resignation.

== Early life and career ==
Anneliese Dodds was born in Aberdeen, Scotland, and was educated at Dunnottar Primary School in Stonehaven and the private co-educational day school Robert Gordon's College in Aberdeen. She then studied philosophy, politics and economics at St Hilda's College, Oxford. While at Oxford, she was involved with student activism and ran for president of Oxford University Student Union (OUSU) in 1998. She was fined £75 for breaking election rules by canvassing using email. In 1999, she became OUSU president, serving until 2000. She took part in protests against the introduction of tuition fees in 2000 and in support of LGBT rights. She graduated in 2001 with a first-class degree.

Dodds later studied for a master's degree in Social Policy at the University of Edinburgh, and a PhD degree in government at the London School of Economics, where she completed a thesis on liberalisation in higher education in France and the UK in 2006. She also had her postdoctoral fellowship at the LSE funded by the Economic and Social Research Council.

Dodds was a lecturer in Public Policy at King's College London from 2007 to 2010 and a senior lecturer in Public Policy at Aston University from 2010 to 2014. Her research interests were in regulation and risk in the public sector, and she has been published in journals such as The Political Quarterly, Public Policy and Administration, and the British Journal of General Practice. In 2018, the second edition of her book, Comparative Public Policy, was published by Red Globe Press, an imprint of Palgrave Macmillan.

== Political career ==
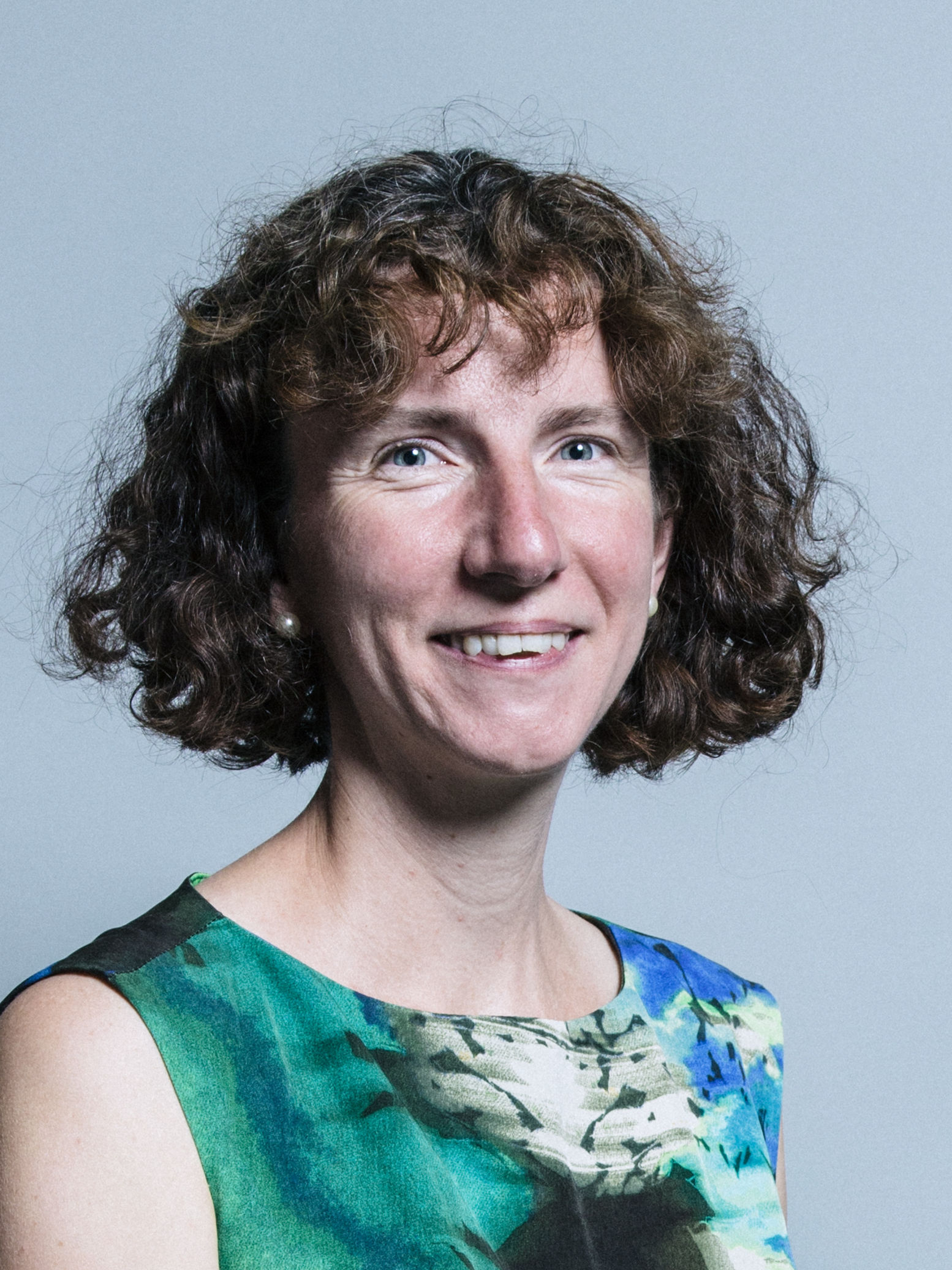
Official portrait, 2017

At the 2005 general election, Dodds stood unsuccessfully as the Labour Party candidate in Billericay, where she finished second with 29.2% of the vote behind the incumbent Conservative Party MP John Baron.

She was also unsuccessful in the 2006 Oxford City council elections for the ward of Holywell.

Dodds also stood unsuccessfully in the 2010 general election in Reading East, finishing third with 25.5% of the vote behind the incumbent Conservative MP Rob Wilson and the Liberal Democrat candidate.

Dodds was elected as a Member of the European Parliament for the South East England region in 2014. In the European Parliament, she sat on the Committee on Economic and Monetary Affairs. In the 2015 Labour leadership election, she supported Yvette Cooper.

At the snap 2017 general election, Dodds was elected to Parliament as MP for Oxford East, winning with 65.2% of the vote and a majority of 23,284.

On 3 July 2017, she was appointed as a Shadow Treasury Minister by Labour leader Jeremy Corbyn. In April 2019, she supported calls for a second Brexit referendum. She was vice-chair of the All-Party Parliamentary Group on Whistleblowing from 2018 to 2019.

Dodds was re-elected as MP for Oxford East at the 2019 general election with a decreased vote share of 57% and a decreased majority of 17,832.

On 5 April 2020, Dodds was appointed Shadow Chancellor of the Exchequer by the newly elected Labour leader Keir Starmer, becoming the first woman to hold this position. Some commentators argued that she struggled to make an impact on the political discussion in the context of generous government spending during the COVID-19 pandemic. In March 2021, The Sunday Times reported that Starmer was preparing to dismiss Dodds. Two months later, after a set of relatively poor results for Labour at the 2021 local elections she was removed from her position in a shadow cabinet reshuffle and replaced with Rachel Reeves. She was then given a role previously held by Deputy Leader Angela Rayner as the party's chair.

Dodds became Shadow Secretary of State for Women and Equalities in September 2021, following the resignation of previous office holder Marsha de Cordova.

In June 2024, Dodds was reselected as the Labour candidate for Oxford East at the 2024 general election. In July 2024 she was re-elected as MP for Oxford East with a decreased vote share of 49.7% and a decreased majority of 14,465. In July 2024, Dodds was appointed International Development Minister and Women and Equalities Minister.

At the end of 2024 she went to southern Africa and announced that £39m would be made available in Malawi to allow 1,500 secondary schoolgirls to receive educational support, scholarships and teacher training.

In February 2025, Dodds resigned as International Development Minister after the UK Government announced that spending on international aid would fall from 0.5% of gross national income to 0.3% in 2027 to fund an increase in defence spending. Dodds argued that the move would "remove food and healthcare from desperate people – deeply harming the UK's reputation".

== Political positions ==
LabourList has described Dodds as a "unity candidate", explaining that although she is not a "Corbynite", she was supported by her predecessor as Shadow Chancellor, John McDonnell, and the Financial Times has said that she is on the "soft left" of the party. In terms of her position on Brexit, she is a remainer, and supported calls for a second referendum on the issue.

While Labour candidate for Reading East in the 2010 election, she explained several of her policy positions, including how she wouldn't take the full salary available to MPs if elected, instead, only taking the average salary of the constituency and "invest[ing] the rest in an improved service" for constituents. On the economy, she argued for increased support for those who need retraining, and those who are long-term unemployed. Furthermore, she stated her desire for "smarter" regulation of the financial system. In terms of criminal justice, she said that helping drug addicts end their dependency, and prosecuting drug dealers whose customers end up dying was important; and in terms of education, she maintained it was important to "better join up children's services across the fields of education, child care, health care and social services".

She described the problem of climate change as a "climate 'emergency'", and wanted to see "far more radical change" to protect against the risks of climate change, suggesting several actions that could help do so, such as banning domestic flights, making it easier to build wind farms, and increased investment in green technology. However, she further explained how these actions should be "realistic and fair", and not be funded by "expensive green taxes". In September 2019, she wrote on her website that she had taken part in climate marches, and explained her interest in ideas to promote increasing cycling and public transport in Oxford, and how "we simply cannot return to business as usual in the next parliamentary session".

During the 2019 general election campaign, she argued in support of Labour's plans to increase corporation tax because she believes "those with the broadest shoulders" should contribute more.

After being appointed Shadow Chancellor in early 2020, she stated that she remained committed to "co-operative and mutual ownership", as was supported under Corbyn's leadership of the party, and opposed the introduction of a universal basic income.

On transgender rights, Dodds has affirmed Labour's commitment to "trans people and women" but also affirmed the requirement for gender dysphoria for legal changes in gender, in addition to claiming the necessity of "places where it is reasonable for biological women only to have access." This has prompted criticism from PinkNews as "sitting on the fence" and Spiked magazine for sacrificing "sex-based rights at the altar of gender ideology".

On the Gaza war, in 2023 Dodds abstained on a motion calling for all parties to agree to a ceasefire. At protests on 23 February 2024, a fundraising event for Dodds was gate-crashed by both Palestinian activists and members of Just Stop Oil. The event was held in a restaurant in Cowley Road, Oxford. Footage of the protest was uploaded to YouTube by Middle East Eye. In April 2024 the Oxford Mail contacted Dodds asking if she would back a ban on arms sales from the UK to Israel. While Dodds told the Mail her sympathies were with the British aid workers killed by Israel during the World Central Kitchen aid convoy attack, she did not confirm her support for banning arms sales to Israel.

In December 2024 she visited Malawi for three days as the UK Minister for Development to talk about "economic growth". She was received by the British High Commissioner Fiona Ritchie before flying on to Zambia.

She is a member of the Fabian Society.

== Personal life ==
Dodds lives in Rose Hill, Oxford and is the partner of Labour Party councillor Ed Turner, the deputy leader of Oxford City Council, and has a son and daughter.

Dodds was sworn of the Privy Council on 10 July 2024, entitling her to be styled "The Right Honourable" for life.

== Publications ==
- Comparative Public Policy (2018, 2nd ed.) ISBN 9781137607041 OCLC 1040263476

European Parliament
Preceded by Peter Skinner	Member of the European Parliament for South East England; 2014–2017	Succeeded by John Howarth
Parliament of the United Kingdom
Preceded by Andrew Smith	Member of Parliament for Oxford East; 2017–present	Incumbent
Political offices
Preceded by John McDonnell	Shadow Chancellor of the Exchequer; 2020–2021	Succeeded by Rachel Reeves
Preceded by Andrew Mitchell	Minister of State for Development; 2024–2025	Vacant
Preceded by Stuart Andrew (Equalities); Maria Caulfield (Women)	Minister of State for Women and Equalities; 2024–2025	Vacant
Party political offices
Preceded by Angela Rayner	Chair of the Labour Party; 2021–2024	Succeeded by Ellie Reeves
