= John Howell (politician) =

British politician

John Howell OBE FSA FRGS
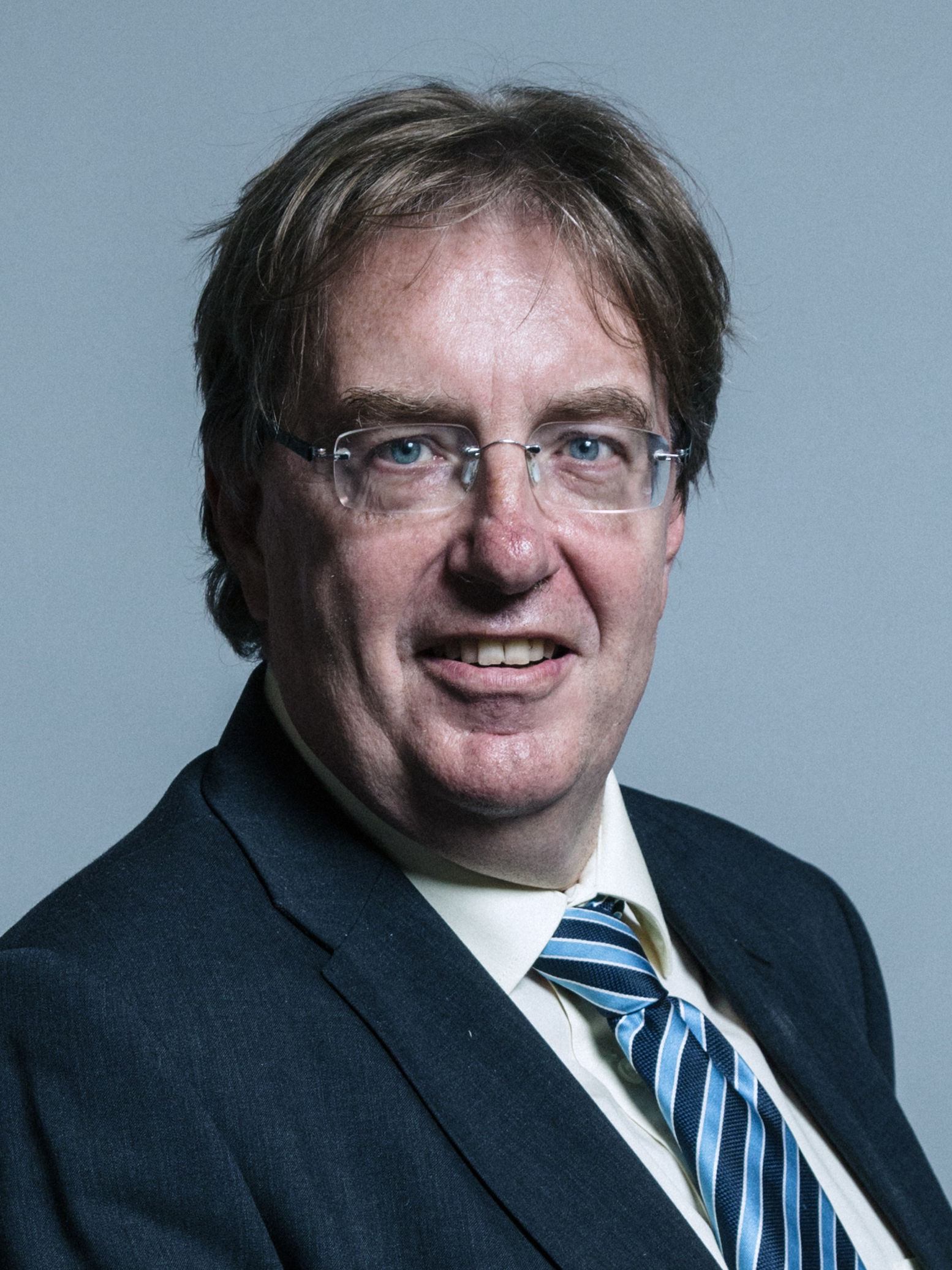
- Official portrait, 2017

Member of Parliament for Henley
- In office 26 June 2008 – 30 May 2024
- Preceded by: Boris Johnson
- Succeeded by: Constituency abolished

Member of Oxfordshire County Council for Dorchester and Berinsfield
- In office 2004–2009
- Preceded by: Roy Tudor-Hughes
- Succeeded by: Lorraine Lindsay-Gale

Personal details
- Born: 27 July 1955 (age 71) Wandsworth, London, England
- Party: Conservative
- Spouse: Alison Parker (m. 1987)
- Children: 3
- Education: University of Edinburgh (BA); St John's College, Oxford (DPhil)
- Website: johnhowell.org.uk

Academic background
- Thesis: Settlement & economy in Neolithic northern France (1981)

John Michael Howell OBE FSA FRGS (born 27 July 1955) is a British politician who served as the Member of Parliament (MP) for Henley from 2008 to 2024. A member of the Conservative Party, he won a by-election to replace Boris Johnson, who resigned following his election as Mayor of London.

== Early life ==
Howell was born in Wandsworth. He studied at the University of Edinburgh and holds a doctorate in archaeology from St John's College, Oxford.

== Career before Parliament ==
He worked as a tax inspector (1982–1985) for the Inland Revenue (now known as HM Revenue and Customs) before moving into the world of accountancy and consultancy as a tax adviser at Arthur Andersen and Ernst & Young. He is a former partner at Ernst & Young.

Howell was a business presenter for BBC World around 1994–1995, though according to Michael Crick "the most remarkable thing about his presenting, apparently, was that he used to wear a bow-tie."

In May 1996, Howell helped set up Fifth World Productions Company. He was one of the directors there until his resignation in October 2003. Howell also held directorships with associated media production companies – Land & Vision Ltd (1998–2002) and The Solution Channel Ltd (2000–2002).

In the 2000 New Year Honours, he was appointed an Officer of the Order of the British Empire (OBE) for "services to Export in Central and Eastern Europe".

Howell was a councillor on Oxfordshire County Council, serving from 2004 to 2009.

== Parliamentary career ==
Howell first became MP for Henley at the 2008 by-election, when the newly elected Mayor of London Boris Johnson resigned as MP.

Following his retaining his seat at the 2010 general election, Howell was appointed the Parliamentary Private Secretary to the Leader of the House of Commons and the Lord Privy Seal, then Sir George Young, Bt. He served on the Work and Pensions Select Committee and Justice Committee.

In 2012 Howell reported receiving death threats after responding to a question on whether he would be acting to try to halt Israeli military actions with a reference to Hamas rocket attacks in an online exchange. Howell was a member of the Parliamentary Group of the Conservative Friends of Israel. Howell declared having received free flights to and accommodation in Israel in 2012, 2015, 2016, 2018 and 2019.

Howell was opposed to Brexit prior to the 2016 referendum. He voted in favour of the withdrawal agreement of the UK from the EU, and advocated against a second referendum to ensure the referendum result was honoured.

At the Conservative Party Conference in 2017, he was quoted by the Henley Standard as saying: "My message to Boris is to keep his bloody mouth shut!" regarding Johnson's demand that the post-Brexit transition should last "not a second longer" than two years. A year later, at the party conference in 2018, when Theresa May was reportedly being undermined by Johnson, The Guardian reported Howell as saying: "As far as I'm concerned Boris can just fuck off."

In 2019, following the election of Johnson to the leadership of the Conservative Party, Howell was quoted by the Henley Standard as saying: "Boris has been elected by a large majority of the party members and I'm a democrat and we must follow that."

In the July–September 2022 Conservative Party leadership election, Howell backed Rishi Sunak to replace Boris Johnson. Howell said he supported Liz Truss after her victory.

In 2023, Howell criticised the proposed construction of a large solar farm in Botley West.

Howell confirmed on 11 April 2023 that he would not stand for re-election at the 2024 general election, citing old age and his intention to pursue "other avenues".

== Other interests ==
Howell is a Fellow of the Society of Antiquaries (who own and run Kelmscott Manor in West Oxfordshire) and of the Royal Geographical Society.

== Books ==
- Settlement and Economy in Neolithic Northern France, British Archaeological Reports, 1983. ISBN 978-0-86054-199-8.
- Understanding Eastern Europe: The Context of Change, 1994. ISBN 978-0-74941-510-5.

Parliament of the United Kingdom
Preceded by Boris Johnson	Member of Parliament for Henley; 2008–2024	Constituency abolished
