= Robert Henderson (British politician) =

British politician

Robert Ronald Henderson (1876 – 16 January 1932) was a Conservative Party politician in the United Kingdom who served as a member of parliament (MP) for Henley from 1924 to 1932.

== Career ==
Henderson was born in 1876, the son of John Henderson.

He was commissioned into the British Army as a second lieutenant in the 3rd Hussars on 15 May 1897, promoted to lieutenant on 14 January 1899, and to captain on 12 July 1901. He saw active service in South Africa during the Second Boer War. Following the end of this war he left Point Natal for British India on the SS Ionian in October 1902 with other officers and men of his regiment, and after arrival in Bombay was stationed in Sialkot in Punjab Province.

Henderson was first elected to Parliament in the 1924 general election for the Oxfordshire constituency of Henley. He remained the constituency's MP until his death in 1932, aged 55. A by-election was held to replace him.

== Family ==
Henderson was married on 20 July 1909 to Margaret Frances Dashwood, the daughter of Sir George Dashwood, 6th Baronet and Lady Mary Seymour, the daughter of the 5th Marquess of Hertford.

Parliament of the United Kingdom
Preceded by Reginald Terrell	Member of Parliament for Henley; 1924 – 1932	Succeeded by Sir Gifford Fox, Bt.
