= Calum Miller =

British politician

Calum Miller MP
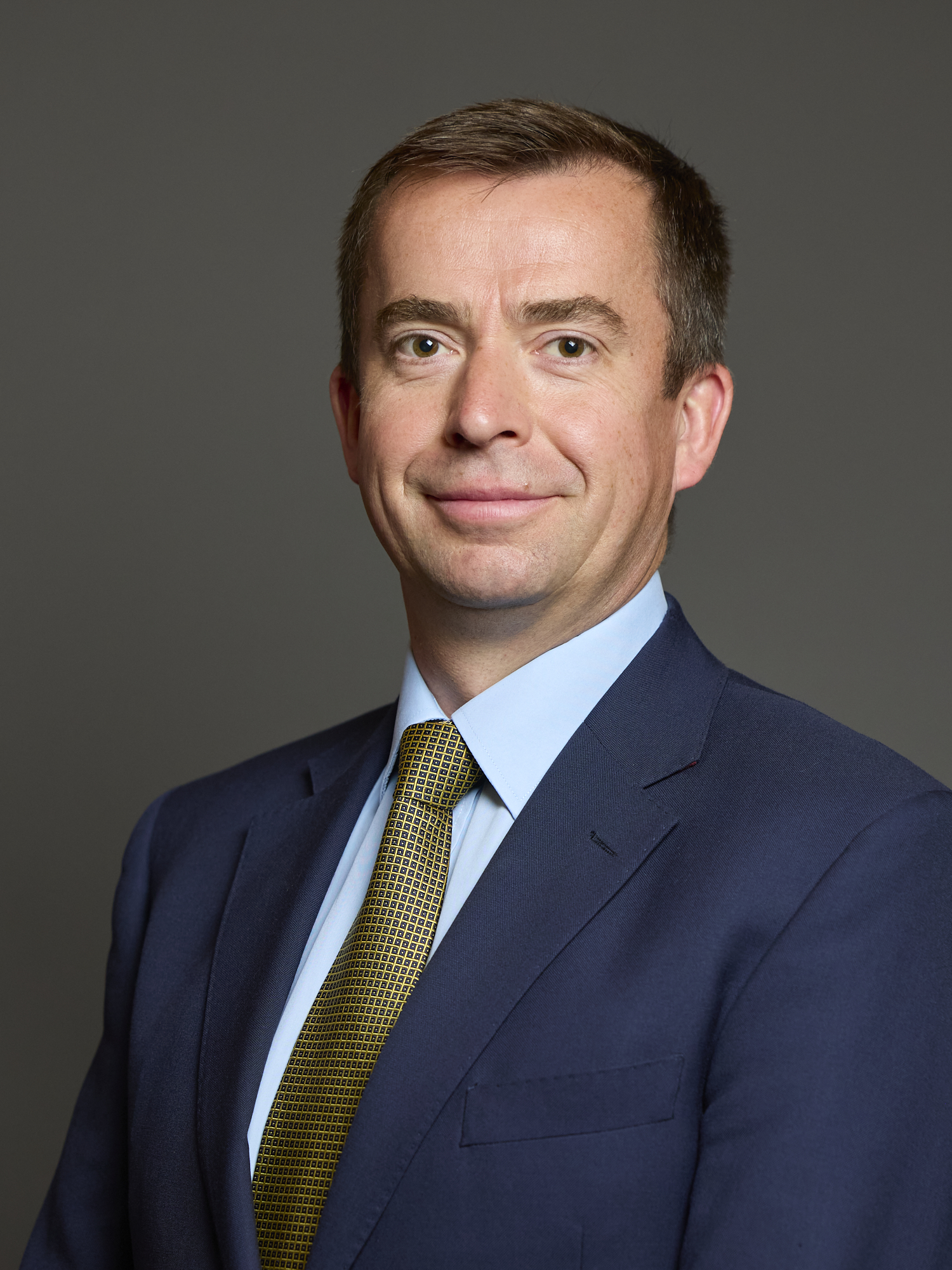
- Official portrait, 2024

Member of Parliament for Bicester and Woodstock
- Incumbent
- Assumed office 4 July 2024
- Preceded by: Constituency established
- Majority: 4,958 (9.9%)

Liberal Democrat Foreign Affairs spokesperson
- Incumbent
- Assumed office 18 September 2024
- Leader: Ed Davey
- Preceded by: Layla Moran

Member of Oxfordshire County Council for Otmoor
- In office 10 May 2021 – 1 May 2025

Personal details
- Born: Calum Alexander Miller
- Party: Liberal Democrats
- Education: University College, Oxford (BA, MPhil)

Calum Alexander Miller is a British Liberal Democrat politician who has been Member of Parliament (MP) for Bicester and Woodstock since 2024.

Formerly a public policy academic and a senior civil servant, he was the principal private secretary to Gus O'Donnell, then head of the Civil Service, and Nick Clegg, then leader of the Liberal Democrats.

In 2021, Miller became a councillor on Oxfordshire County Council and served as the council's cabinet member for finance.

== Early life and education ==
Miller attended University College, Oxford, from 1996. He graduated with a Bachelor of Arts (BA) degree in philosophy, politics and economics, followed by a Master of Philosophy (MPhil) degree in international relations. From 2003 to 2005, he was a research associate of the Global Economic Governance Programme at Oxford.

== Career ==
Miller worked for 13 years in the Civil Service, serving as principal private secretary to Gus O'Donnell, the cabinet secretary, from 2009 to 2010; and to Nick Clegg, the deputy prime minister, from 2010 to 2012.

In 2012, Miller joined the University of Oxford's Blavatnik School of Government, where he has served as its chief operating officer, co-director of Research on Improving Systems of Education (RISE), and senior fellow of practice in public management. He is a supernumerary fellow of University College, his alma mater.

Miller was elected to Oxfordshire County Council for the division of Otmoor in the 2021 election. He was appointed the council's cabinet member for finance in the Oxfordshire Fair Deal Alliance, a coalition comprising the Liberal Democrats, the Green Party and the Labour Party. He stepped down as a cabinet member in October 2023 after being selected as a Liberal Democrat prospective parliamentary candidate.

In the 2024 general election, Miller was elected as MP for the new constituency of Bicester and Woodstock, gaining 38.7 per cent of the vote and a majority of 4,958 over the Conservative candidate.

On 24 July 2024 he asked new Prime Minister Keir Starmer his first question at Prime Minister's Questions on the subject of pollution and sewage in the River Evenlode which is in his constituency.

== Personal life ==
Miller is a member of the Church of England and the Church of Scotland. His father was the general secretary of the Scottish Liberal Democrats before becoming a Church of Scotland minister.

Parliament of the United Kingdom
New constituency	Member of Parliament for Bicester and Woodstock; 2024–present	Incumbent
