= Gifford Fox =

British politician (1903–1959)

Sir Gifford Wheaton Grey Fox, 2nd Baronet (2 February 1903 – 11 February 1959) was a British politician. He served as a Conservative Member of Parliament (MP) from 1932 to 1950.

Gifford Fox succeeded his father, Gilbert Fox, as a baronet, of Liverpool, Lancashire on 21 February 1925. The baronetcy had been created on 30 January 1924. His first marriage took place on 20 October 1927 to The Honourable Myra Newton, daughter of George Newton, 1st Baron Eltisley. They divorced in 1952. His second wife was Maryoth Hay, the paternal granddaughter of the 10th Marquess of Tweeddale, whom he married on 2 March 1954.

Fox was first elected to Parliament on 25 February 1932 in a by-election in the Oxfordshire constituency of Henley. The by-election had been caused by the death on 16 January 1932 of Robert Henderson. Fox remained as the MP for Henley until the 1950 general election.

Fox died in 1959, aged 56, and the baronetcy became extinct.

== Arms ==
Coat of arms of Gifford Fox

Crest
A demi-fox Proper resting the sinister paw on a rose as in the arms.
Escutcheon
Per chevron Azure and Or in chief two foxes' heads erased of the second and in base a rose Gules barbed and seeded Proper.
Motto
Vigila Et Aude

Baronetage of the United Kingdom
Preceded by Gilbert Fox	Baronet (of Liverpool); 1925–1959	Extinct
Parliament of the United Kingdom
Preceded by Robert Henderson	Member of Parliament for Henley; 1932 – 1950	Succeeded by John Hay
