= John Hay (Henley MP) =

British solicitor and politician (1919–1998)

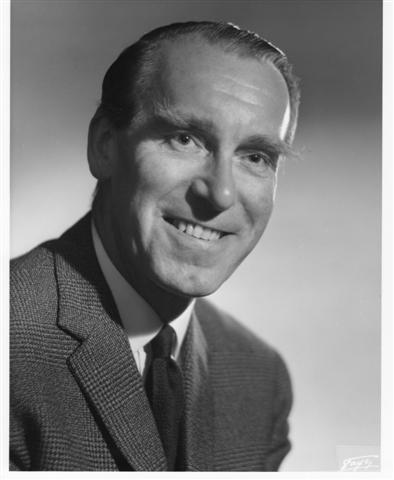
John Hay

John Albert Hay (24 November 1919 – 27 January 1998) was a British Conservative politician.

Hay was born in Brighton, Sussex, to John Edward Hay (Mayor of Brighton 1953) and May Hollingdale. He was a brother to author Peter Thomas Hay. He was educated at Brighton, Hove and Sussex Grammar School. He served as a Sub-Lieutenant in the Royal Navy during World War II and was invalided out.

He married Beryl Found, the only daughter of Ret. Commander Herbert Found R.N. and Alice Found. They had two children, Victoria (born 1949) and Richard (born 1953). Their marriage ended in divorce.

Hay worked as a solicitor practicing in Brighton and London. He served as Chairman of the Young Conservatives 1947–49 and was elected to Parliament in 1950 as Member for Henley, South Oxfordshire. He became Parliamentary Private Secretary to the President of the Board of Trade, 1951–55, and later served as Parliamentary Secretary to the Ministry of Transport from 1959 to 1963 under Ernest Marples, where he introduced parking meters, and as the last Civil Lord of the Admiralty from 1963 to 1964, whereupon the reorganisation of the Ministry of Defence, he became Parliamentary Under-Secretary of State for the Army until the Labour Party won the October 1964 general election.

Hay retired from politics and Parliament in 1974 and married Janet Spruce in 1975. They emigrated to Canada and he died in West Vancouver in 1998.

Parliament of the United Kingdom
Preceded by Gifford Fox	Member of Parliament for Henley; 1950 – February 1974	Succeeded by Michael Heseltine
