= Andrew Smith (British politician) =

British politician (born 1951)

The Right Honourable Andrew Smith
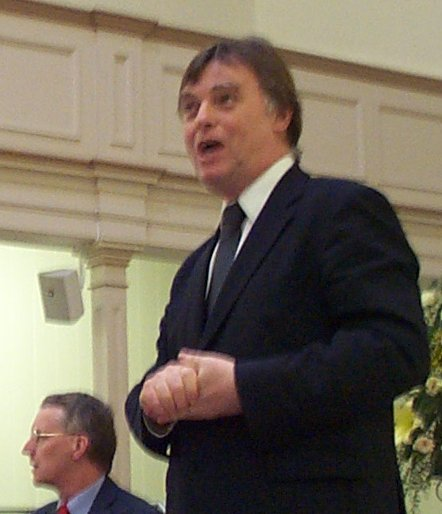
- Smith in 2005

Secretary of State for Work and Pensions
- In office 29 May 2002 – 8 September 2004
- Prime Minister: Tony Blair
- Preceded by: Alistair Darling
- Succeeded by: Alan Johnson

Chief Secretary to the Treasury
- In office 11 October 1999 – 29 May 2002
- Prime Minister: Tony Blair
- Chancellor: Gordon Brown
- Preceded by: Alan Milburn
- Succeeded by: Paul Boateng

Minister of State for Employment and Disability Rights
- In office 2 May 1997 – 11 October 1999
- Prime Minister: Tony Blair
- Preceded by: Eric Forth
- Succeeded by: Tessa Jowell

Shadow Secretary of State for Transport
- In office 25 July 1996 – 2 May 1997
- Leader: Tony Blair
- Preceded by: Clare Short
- Succeeded by: George Young

Shadow Chief Secretary to the Treasury
- In office 21 July 1994 – 25 July 1996
- Leader: Tony Blair
- Preceded by: Harriet Harman
- Succeeded by: Alistair Darling

Member of Parliament for Oxford East
- In office 11 June 1987 – 3 May 2017
- Preceded by: Steven Norris
- Succeeded by: Anneliese Dodds

Personal details
- Born: 1 February 1951 (age 75) Wokingham, Berkshire, England
- Party: Labour
- Spouse: Val Miles (1976–2015)
- Education: St John's College, Oxford
- Website: Official website (archived)

Andrew David Smith (born 1 February 1951) is a British Labour Party politician who was the Member of Parliament (MP) for Oxford East from 1987 until 2017. He served in the Cabinet as Chief Secretary to the Treasury from 1999 to 2002 and then as Secretary of State for Work and Pensions from 2002 to 2004.

Smith retired from the House of Commons at the 2017 general election.

== Early life ==
Smith was educated at Reading School and St John's College, Oxford, where he gained a BA and BPhil. He was the Member Relations Officer for Oxford and Swindon Co-op Society from 1979 to 1987. He became an Oxford city councillor in 1976, leaving the council in 1987. He contested Oxford East in 1983.

== Parliamentary career ==
Smith was the Member of Parliament for Oxford East, which he won in 1987, defeating Conservative MP Steven Norris. After Labour won government in the 1997 general election he was made a minister in the Department for Education and Employment. He was Chief Secretary to the Treasury from 1999 to 2002, when he became Secretary of State for Work and Pensions; he resigned from this post on 6 September 2004, to spend more time with his family. He won re-election in his Oxford East seat in the 2005 General Election, but saw his majority slashed by 90%.

Smith is best remembered by some for his opposing of the privatisation of air traffic control in 1996 stating "Our air is not for sale" only for Labour to switch policies and thereby propose a public–private partnership for the National Air Traffic Services. Others point to his stewardship of the Department for Work and Pensions and his focus on reducing child poverty when minister there.

Smith was the chair and one of the founding members of the International Parliamentarians for West Papua, launched in October 2008.

Smith occasionally rebelled against his party in Parliament, on issues such as a third runway at Heathrow, the Government's renewal of Trident, and notably backed opposition Liberal Democrats motions on votes concerning the rights of Gurkhas to remain in Britain and the introduction of single transferable vote for elections.

In 2005 the Liberal Democrats came within 963 votes of winning the seat, with the drop in support for Labour widely attributed to the Iraq War, but in 2010 Smith secured a comfortable victory with a 4.1% swing to Labour, bucking the national trend. Similarly, in 2015, he was re-elected with 50% of the vote, an increase of 7.5% over 2010.

In the 2010 Labour leadership election, Smith supported Ed Balls. In the 2015 Labour leadership election, with minutes to spare before the deadline for nominees ended, he nominated Jeremy Corbyn despite not actually supporting Corbyn. Smith nominated Corbyn because he wanted a "broad debate" about the direction of the Labour Party. Smith was the 35th Labour MP to nominate Corbyn, which gave Corbyn the minimum number of votes he needed to appear on the ballot.

Smith supported Owen Smith's unsuccessful candidacy in the 2016 Labour leadership election after the Parliamentary Labour Party declared non-confidence in Corbyn's leadership.

On 19 April 2017, Smith announced that he would not seek re-election in the 2017 general election.

== Personal life ==
Smith was married to Valerie Miles, a former Lord Mayor of Oxford, county councillor on Oxfordshire County Council and city councillor on Oxford City Council from 26 March 1976 until her death in 2015. They had a son, Luke. Smith lives in Blackbird Leys, Oxford.

Parliament of the United Kingdom
Preceded by Steven Norris	Member of Parliament for Oxford East; 1987–2017	Succeeded by Anneliese Dodds
Political offices
Preceded by Clare Short	Shadow Secretary of State for Transport; 1996–1997	Succeeded by George Young
Preceded by Alan Milburn	Chief Secretary to the Treasury; 1999–2002	Succeeded by Paul Boateng
Preceded by Alistair Darling	Secretary of State for Work and Pensions; 2002–2004	Succeeded by Alan Johnson
