= Reginald Terrell =

British politician

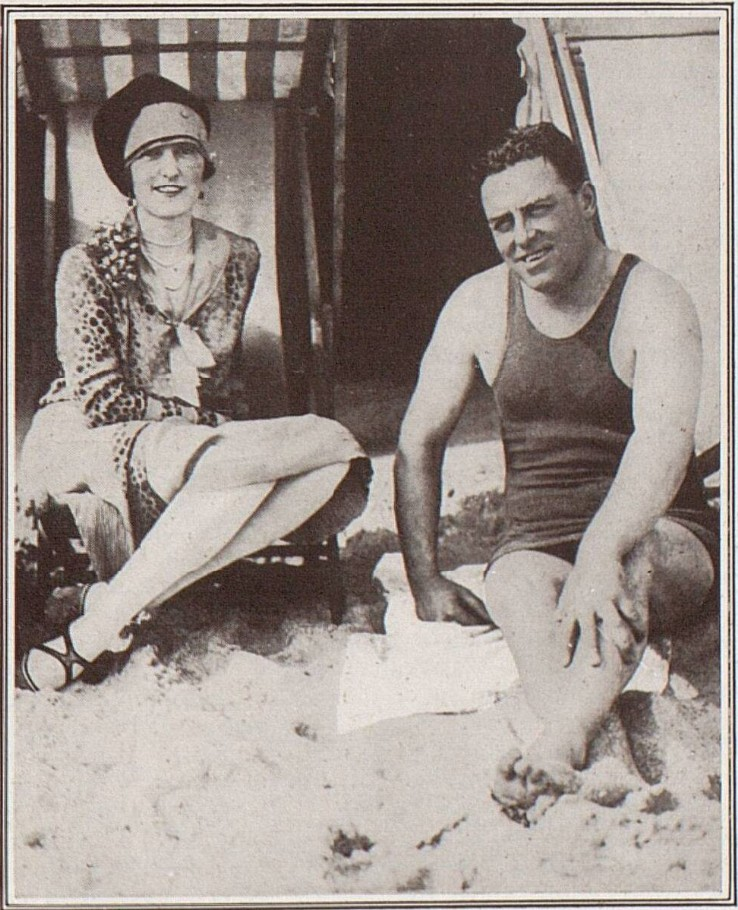
Reginald Terrell, pictured with his wife, in The Tatler, Wednesday 23 February 1927

Sir Thomas Antonio Reginald Terrell (18 January 1889 – 5 February 1979) was a British Conservative politician, MP for Henley (UK Parliament constituency) from 1918 until 1924. Prior to becoming an MP he served in the First World War. He was knighted in 1959.

He was born in Mortlake, Surrey, the son of George Terrell and his first wife, Mary Terrell née Logan. Unusually, he and his father both sat in Parliament at the same time, with his father representing Chippenham from 1910 until 1922. He married Marjorie E O'Connor in Kensington in 1923.

Parliament of the United Kingdom
Preceded by Sir Robert Hermon-Hodge, Bt	Member of Parliament for Henley; 1918 – 1924	Succeeded by Robert Henderson
