= Henley and Thame =

UK Parliament constituency (since 2024)

- County constituency for the House of Commons
- Boundaries since 2024
- Boundary of Henley and Thame in South East England
- County: Oxfordshire
- Electorate: 70,626 (2023)
- Major settlements: Henley-on-Thames; Thame

Current constituency
- Created: 2024
- Member of Parliament: Freddie van Mierlo (Liberal Democrats)
- Seats: One
- Created from: Henley

Henley and Thame is a constituency of the House of Commons in the UK Parliament. Further to the completion of the 2023 Periodic Review of Westminster constituencies, it was first contested at the 2024 general election. The seat was won by Freddie van Mierlo representing the Liberal Democrats.

The constituency name comes from the towns of Henley-on-Thames and Thame in Oxfordshire.

== Constituency profile ==
The Henley and Thame constituency is located in Oxfordshire and covers a large rural area between Oxford and Reading. A large part of the constituency is covered by the Chilterns, a protected National Landscape of chalk hills. The constituency is named after its two main towns, Henley-on-Thames and Thame, which each have populations of around 13,000. Other settlements include the small market town of Watlington and the villages of Sonning Common, Goring-on-Thames, Benson, Chalgrove, Chinnor and Wheatley. Henley-on-Thames and Thame are affluent, historic towns which fall within the 10% least-deprived areas in England. The average house price in the constituency is higher than the rest of South East England and almost double the national average.

In general, residents of the constituency are older, more religious, well-educated and have very high levels of income compared to the rest of the country. A high proportion of residents work in professional or scientific occupations. White people made up 94% of the population at the 2021 census. At the local council level, most of the constituency is represented by Liberal Democrats with some Green Party councillors elected in the rural areas and villages. An estimated 56% of voters in the constituency supported remaining in the European Union in the 2016 referendum, higher than the nationwide figure of 48%.

== Boundaries ==
The constituency is composed of the following (as they existed on 1 December 2020):

- The District of South Oxfordshire wards of: Benson & Crowmarsh; Berinsfield; Chalgrove; Chinnor; Forest Hill & Holton; Garsington & Horspath; Goring; Haseley Brook; Henley-on-Thames; Kidmore End & Whitchurch; Sonning Common; Thame; Watlington; Wheatley; Woodcote & Rotherfield.

It comprises the bulk of the former Henley parliamentary constituency.

== Members of Parliament ==
Henley prior to 2024

Election	Member	Party
2024	Freddie van Mierlo	Liberal Democrats

== Elections ==
=== Elections in the 2020s ===
General election 2024: Henley and Thame
Party	Candidate	Votes	%	±%
Liberal Democrats	Freddie van Mierlo	23,904	45.0	+12.6
Conservative	Caroline Newton	17,637	33.2	−21.3
Reform	Peter Shields	5,213	9.8	N/A
Labour	Nanda Manley-Browne	3,574	6.7	−2.2
Green	Jo Robb	2,008	3.8	−0.4
SDP	Maryse Pomlett	515	1.0	N/A
Independent	David Carpin	306	0.6	N/A
Majority		6,267	11.8	N/A
Turnout		53,157	72.1	−4.1
Registered electors		73,749		
Liberal Democrats gain from Conservative		Swing	+17.0	

=== Elections in the 2010s ===
2019 notional result
Party	Vote	%
Conservative	29,333	54.5
Liberal Democrats	17,432	32.4
Labour	4,809	8.9
Green	2,268	4.2
Turnout	53,842	76.2
Registered electors	70,626	

== See also ==
- List of parliamentary constituencies in Oxfordshire
- List of parliamentary constituencies in the South East England (region)
