= 1932 Henley by-election =

UK parliamentary by-election

The 1932 Henley by-election was a parliamentary by-election held on 25 February 1932 for the UK House of Commons constituency of Henley.

== Vacancy ==
The seat had become vacant when the Conservative Member of Parliament Robert Henderson died on 16 January 1932. He had represented the seat in Parliament since the 1924 general election.

== Electoral history ==
Created for the 1885 general election, Henley had been won by the Conservative candidate at every election except for 1906; when it was won by a Liberal. Liberal candidate Sir Henry Rew came very close to winning at both the 1922 and 1923 general elections. The Labour Party, had only ever run candidates at the two previous elections, 1929 and 1931, finishing in third place on both occasions. At the last election, the Conservative victory was comfortable.

General election 1931: Henley
Party	Candidate	Votes	%	±%
Conservative	Robert Henderson	24,015	72.2	+20.3
Liberal	Borlase Matthews	5,411	16.3	−13.6
Labour	Frederick J Hembury	3,809	11.5	−6.7
Majority		18,604	55.9	+33.9
Turnout		33,235	68.6	−4.7
Conservative hold		Swing	+16.95	

== Candidates ==
The Liberal challenger was 54 year-old Borlase Matthews. He had been the Liberal candidate at the 1931 general election. He was an engineer but left engineering to take up farming. He was a Member of the Council of the Royal Agricultural Society. He was a Member of the Electricity Commissioners Rural Electrification Conference. He was Chairman of the Rural Reconstruction Association. He was also an author of several books and papers on farming.

== Campaign ==
The key issue of the election was free trade v tariffs. Both the Conservative and Liberal parties were members of the National Government and a debate was going on within the government over this issue with the Liberals favouring free trade and the Conservatives, protection. The debate in Henley was identical to that national debate. Former Liberal leader Lloyd George, who had split from his party over their support for the National Government, sent a public letter of support to the Liberal candidate.

== Result ==
The Conservative candidate Sir Gifford Fox, held the seat for the party. The Conservative share of the vote fell by 2.3% while the Liberal share, helped by the absence of a Labour candidate, went up by 13.8%. This gave a swing from Conservative to Liberal of 8%. The Conservative share of the vote was still higher than it had been at the free trade v tariff general election in 1923.

Henley by-election, 1932
Party	Candidate	Votes	%	±%
Conservative	Gifford Fox	16,553	69.9	–2.3
Liberal	Borlase Matthews	7,129	30.1	+13.8
Majority		9,424	39.8	–16.1
Turnout		23,682	48.9	–19.7
Conservative hold		Swing	-8.05	

== Aftermath ==
The difference of opinion inside the National Government on the issue of trade, led to the Liberal Party withdrawing from the National Government. At the following general election, Sir Gifford Fox faced a new Liberal challenger and comfortably won re-election. Borlase Matthews was the unsuccessful Liberal candidate at Ashford.

General election 1935: Henley
Party	Candidate	Votes	%	±%
Conservative	Gifford Fox	22,024	70.4	−1.8
Liberal	John Herbert May	9,254	29.6	+13.3
Majority		12,770	40.8	−15.1
Turnout		31,278	56.9	−11.7
Conservative hold		Swing	+1.0	
