= Mid Oxfordshire =

UK Parliament constituency (1974–1983)

- Former county constituency for the House of Commons

February 1974–1983
- Seats: one
- Created from: Banbury, Henley
- Replaced by: Witney, Oxford East, Henley and Banbury

Mid Oxfordshire was a parliamentary constituency in Oxfordshire, returning one Member of Parliament (MP) to the House of Commons of the Parliament of the United Kingdom. Unusually, its official name - Mid-Oxon - incorporated an abbreviation (Oxon, for Oxonia) but the full form of the county name was and is normally used in referring to the constituency.

The constituency was created for the February 1974 general election from parts of the seats of Banbury and Henley, and abolished for the 1983 general election.

Throughout its existence, the seat was represented for the Conservatives by Douglas Hurd with comfortable majorities.

== Boundaries ==
- The Urban District of Witney;
- The Rural District of Witney; and
- Parts of the Rural Districts of Bullingdon and Ploughley.

The constituency was formed largely from the constituency of Banbury, incorporating the Urban and Rural Districts of Witney and the parts of the Rural District of Ploughley in Banbury, including Kidlington. It also included further parts of the Rural District of Ploughley (to the south of Bicester) and northernmost parts of the Rural District of Bullingdon (to the east of Oxford), transferred from Henley.

It was abolished in 1983, following the reform of local government districts which came into effect in 1974. The bulk of the constituency, including the areas constituting the former Urban and Rural Districts of Witney, together with the town of Kidlington, formed the new constituency of Witney. Eastern rural areas were transferred to Banbury and Henley, with the wards of Marston and Risinghurst being included in the new constituency of Oxford East.

== Members of Parliament ==
Election	Member	Party
Feb 1974	Douglas Hurd	Conservative
1983	constituency abolished	

== Elections ==
=== Elections in the 1970s ===
General election February 1974: Mid Oxfordshire
Party	Candidate	Votes	%	±%
Conservative	Douglas Hurd	22,148	45.23	
Labour	Eric Parsloe	14,175	28.95	
Liberal	Robert Sparrow	12,160	24.83	
Ind. Conservative	John Playford Myhill	488	1.00	
Majority		7,973	16.28	
Turnout		48,951	82.73	
Conservative win (new seat)				

General election October 1974: Mid Oxfordshire
Party	Candidate	Votes	%	±%
Conservative	Douglas Hurd	20,944	45.94	+0.71
Labour	Malcolm John Saunders	13,641	29.92	+0.97
Liberal	Muriel Eda Burton	11,006	24.14	−0.69
Majority		7,303	16.02	−0.26
Turnout		45,591	76.37	−6.36
Conservative hold		Swing	-0.13	

General election 1979: Mid Oxfordshire
Party	Candidate	Votes	%	±%
Conservative	Douglas Hurd	28,465	56.92	+10.98
Labour	John Hedge	13,004	26.00	−3.92
Liberal	Muriel Eda Burton	8,367	16.73	−7.41
Independent	P Madden	174	0.35	New
Majority		15,461	30.92	+14.90
Turnout		50,010	79.11	+2.74
Conservative hold		Swing	+7.45	
