= 1917 Henley by-election =

UK parliamentary by-election

The 1917 Henley by-election was a by-election in Henley caused by the death of Major Valentine Fleming during World War I. The Conservative candidate Robert Hermon-Hodge won the subsequent by-election on 20 June 1917. He was unopposed due to a War-time electoral pact.
