= Henley (constituency) =

Parliamentary constituency in the United Kingdom, 1885–2024

Coordinates: 51.65°N 1.05°W

- Former county constituency for the House of Commons
- Boundary of Henley in Oxfordshire

- Location of Oxfordshire within England
- County: Oxfordshire
- Electorate: 73,851 (December 2010)
- Major settlements: Henley, Thame and Chinnor

1885–2024
- Seats: One
- Created from: Oxfordshire
- Replaced by: Henley and Thame

Henley was a constituency (Note: A county constituency (for the purposes of election expenses and type of returning officer)) in Oxfordshire represented in the House of Commons of the UK Parliament from 2008 to 2024 by John Howell, a Member of Parliament from the Conservative Party. (Note: As with all constituencies, the constituency elects one Member of Parliament (MP) by the first past the post system of election at least every five years.)

Under the 2023 review of Westminster constituencies, the constituency was subject to minor boundary changes. It was renamed Henley and Thame, and was first contested at the 2024 general election.

== Constituency profile ==
The seat has throughout its history consisted of the town of Henley, a part of the Chiltern Hills AONB interspersed by the larger settlements of Thame and Chinnor, and a narrow, more developed area adjoining the Thames on one bank. The local economy, interconnected with London, Oxford and in the far south Reading, ensures a high rate of employment and its natural environment attracts retirees and high income owners. The seat has good rail connections to Central London. As of 2021, the largest town in the constituency is Thame.

== History ==
The constituency was established under the Redistribution of Seats Act 1885 for the 1885 general election when the three-member Parliamentary County of Oxfordshire was divided into the three single-member seats of Banbury, Woodstock and Henley.

Prominent members

Two prominent Cabinet ministers have been elected for Henley. Michael Heseltine served as the MP for Henley from 1974–2001. Heseltine was succeeded by the future Mayor of London and Prime Minister Boris Johnson, rapidly made a shadow minister during the period of the Labour government. (Note: Johnson returned to Parliament in 2015, as the MP for Uxbridge and South Ruislip, and was in 2016 appointed Foreign Secretary in the May Ministry.) In May 2008, Johnson was elected as Mayor of London, and he subsequently resigned from the Commons on 4 June 2008, resulting in a by-election in the constituency, which was won by John Howell.

Political history

An unbroken succession of Conservative candidates have won the seat since 1910. The 2008 by-election was closer than general elections since 2001 and won by the Conservative candidate, John Howell. Howell was re-elected at the 2010 general election and again in 2015, when Labour finished second for the first time since 1970 in Henley. The 2015 GE result made the seat the twelfth safest of the Conservative Party's 331 seats by percentage of majority.

Other parties

All five parties' candidates achieved more than deposit-retaining threshold of 5% of the vote in 2015, reflecting frequent such results for the Green Party and UKIP in that election. Liberal Democrat or predecessor-party Liberal candidates were second-placed between February 1974 and 2010 (inclusive). The closest contest for Henley was in 1966, when Labour's George Cunningham took 44.6% of the vote in a two-candidate contest.

Turnout

At general elections, turnout in the constituency has ranged between 52.9% in the "khaki election" of 1918 to 81.7% in 1950.

== Boundaries and boundary changes ==
=== 1885–1918 ===
- The Municipal Borough of Henley-on-Thames
- The Sessional Divisions of Henley and Wallington
- Part of the Sessional Division of Bullingdon; and
- The part of the Municipal Borough of Abingdon in the county of Oxfordshire.

=== 1918–1950 ===
- The Municipal Borough of Henley-on-Thames;
- The Urban Districts of Bicester, Thame, and Wheatley; and
- The Rural Districts of Bicester, Crowmarsh, Culham, Goring, Headington, Henley, and Thame.

Expanded to include eastern half of the abolished Woodstock Division, including Bicester. Caversham, which had been absorbed by the County Borough of Reading, was transferred to the Parliamentary Borough of Reading in Berkshire.

=== 1950–1974 ===
- The Municipal Borough of Henley-on-Thames;
- The Urban Districts of Bicester and Thame;
- The Rural Districts of Bullingdon and Henley; and
- Part of the Rural District of Ploughley.

Change to contents due to reorganisation of urban and rural districts. Minor losses to the Oxford constituency, including Cowley and Headington, as a result of the expansion of the County Borough of Oxford.

=== 1974–1983 ===
- The Municipal Borough of Henley-on-Thames;
- The Urban District of Thame;
- The Rural District of Henley; and
- Part of the Rural District of Bullingdon.

Bicester and northern parts of Rural District of Ploughley transferred to Banbury. Southern parts of the Rural District of Ploughley and northernmost parts of the Rural District of Bullingdon included in the new County Constituency of Mid-Oxon.

=== 1983–1997 ===
- The District of South Oxfordshire wards of Aston Rowant, Benson, Berinsfield, Chalgrove, Chinnor, Clifton Hampden, Crowmarsh, Dorchester, Forest Hill, Garsington, Goring, Goring Heath, Great Milton, Henley, Kidmore End, Nettlebed, Rotherfield Peppard, Shiplake, Sonning Common, Thame North, Thame South, Watlington, Wheatley, and Woodcote.

Gained the rural area to the east of Oxford from the abolished County Constituency of Mid-Oxon. The Littlemore ward to the south of Oxford was included in the new Borough Constituency of Oxford East.

=== 1997–2010 ===
As above plus Horspath ward which was added following a change to local authority boundaries.

Minor gain from Oxford East.

=== 2010–2024 ===
Map of boundaries 2010–2024

- The District of South Oxfordshire wards of Aston Rowant, Benson, Berinsfield, Chalgrove, Chilton Woods, Chinnor, Clifton Hampden, Crowmarsh, Forest Hill, Garsington, Goring, Great Milton, Henley North, Henley South, Stoke Row, Kidmore End, Nettlebed, Rotherfield Peppard, Shiplake, Sonning Common, Thame North, Thame South, Watlington, Wheatley, and Woodcote; and
- The District of Cherwell wards of Fringford & Heyfords and Launton & Otmoor.

The two wards in the District of Cherwell, to the south of Bicester, were transferred from Banbury.

The constituency covered most of the local government district of South Oxfordshire, excluding Wallingford, Didcot and surrounding areas in the west. Main settlements include Henley-on-Thames itself, Thame, Chinnor and Sonning Common. The two wards of Cherwell are to the north, close to Oxford; they are predominantly rural.

== Members of Parliament ==
Election	Member	Party
1885	Edward Vernon Harcourt	Conservative
1886	Francis Parker	Conservative
1895	Robert Hermon-Hodge	Conservative
1906	Philip Morrell	Liberal
1910	Valentine Fleming	Conservative
1917 by-election	Sir Robert Hermon-Hodge	Conservative
1918	Reginald Terrell	Coalition Conservative
1922	Reginald Terrell	Conservative
1924	Robert Henderson	Conservative
1932 by-election	Gifford Fox	Conservative
1950	John Hay	Conservative
February 1974	Michael Heseltine	Conservative
2001	Boris Johnson	Conservative
2008 by-election	John Howell	Conservative

== Elections ==
=== Elections in the 2010s ===
General election 2019: Henley
Party	Candidate	Votes	%	±%
Conservative	John Howell	32,189	54.8	−4.3
Liberal Democrats	Laura Coyle	18,136	30.9	+16.0
Labour	Zaid Marham	5,698	9.7	−10.4
Green	Jo Robb	2,736	4.7	+1.4
Majority		14,053	23.9	−14.9
Turnout		58,759	76.6	+0.3
Conservative hold		Swing	−10.2	

General election 2017: Henley
Party	Candidate	Votes	%	±%
Conservative	John Howell	33,749	59.1	+0.6
Labour	Oliver Kavanagh	11,455	20.1	+7.6
Liberal Democrats	Laura Coyle	8,485	14.9	+3.7
Green	Robin Bennett	1,864	3.3	−3.6
UKIP	Tim Scott	1,154	2.0	−8.9
The Radical Party	Patrick Gray	392	0.7	New
Majority		22,294	39.0	−7.0
Turnout		57,218	76.3	+5.4
Conservative hold		Swing	−3.5	

General election 2015: Henley
Party	Candidate	Votes	%	±%
Conservative	John Howell	32,292	58.5	+2.3
Labour	Sam Juthani	6,917	12.5	+1.6
Liberal Democrats	Sue Cooper	6,205	11.2	−14.0
UKIP	Christopher Jones	6,007	10.9	+7.5
Green	Mark Stevenson	3,815	6.9	+4.4
Majority		25,375	46.0	+15.0
Turnout		55,236	70.9	−0.5
Conservative hold		Swing		

General election 2010: Henley
Party	Candidate	Votes	%	±%
Conservative	John Howell	30,054	56.2	+3.0
Liberal Democrats	Andy Crick	13,466	25.2	−0.9
Labour	Richard McKenzie	5,835	10.9	−4.1
UKIP	Laurence Hughes	1,817	3.4	+0.9
Green	Mark Stevenson	1,328	2.5	−0.8
BNP	John Bews	1,020	1.9	−1.7
Majority		16,588	31.0	+3.5
Turnout		53,520	71.4	+3.6
Conservative hold		Swing	+1.9	

=== Elections in the 2000s ===
2008 Henley by-election
Party	Candidate	Votes	%	±%
Conservative	John Howell	19,796	56.9	+3.4
Liberal Democrats	Stephen Kearney	9,680	27.8	+1.8
Green	Mark Stevenson	1,321	3.8	+0.5
BNP	Tim Rait	1,243	3.6	New
Labour	Richard McKenzie	1,066	3.1	−11.6
UKIP	Chris Adams	843	2.4	−0.1
Monster Raving Loony	Bananaman Owen	242	0.7	New
English Democrat	Derek Allpass	157	0.4	New
Independent	Amanda Harrington	128	0.4	New
Common Good	Dick Rodgers	121	0.3	New
Independent	Louise Cole	91	0.3	New
Fur Play Party	Harry Bear	73	0.2	New
Majority		10,116	29.1	+1.6
Turnout		34,761	50.5	−17.4
Conservative hold		Swing	+0.8	

General election 2005: Henley
Party	Candidate	Votes	%	±%
Conservative	Boris Johnson	24,894	53.5	+7.4
Liberal Democrats	David Turner	12,101	26.0	−1.0
Labour	Kaleem Saeed	6,862	14.7	−6.4
Green	Mark Stevenson	1,518	3.3	+0.7
UKIP	Delphine Gray-Fisk	1,162	2.5	−0.7
Majority		12,793	27.5	+8.4
Turnout		46,537	67.9	+3.6
Conservative hold		Swing	+4.2	

General election 2001: Henley
Party	Candidate	Votes	%	±%
Conservative	Boris Johnson	20,466	46.1	−0.3
Liberal Democrats	Catherine Bearder	12,008	27.0	+2.3
Labour	Janet Matthews	9,367	21.1	−1.6
UKIP	Philip Collings	1,413	3.2	New
Green	Oliver Tickell	1,147	2.6	+1.6
Majority		8,458	19.1	−2.6
Turnout		44,401	64.3	−13.3
Conservative hold		Swing	−1.3	

=== Elections in the 1990s ===
General election 1997: Henley
Party	Candidate	Votes	%	±%
Conservative	Michael Heseltine	23,908	46.4	−13.3
Liberal Democrats	Tim Horton	12,741	24.7	+0.6
Labour	Duncan Enright	11,700	22.7	+7.8
Referendum	Sebastian Sainsbury	2,299	4.5	New
Green	Susan Miles	514	1.0	New
Natural Law	Nigel Barlow	221	0.4	−0.1
Whig Party	Thomas Hibbert	160	0.3	New
Majority		11,167	21.7	−13.9
Turnout		51,543	77.6	−2.2
Conservative hold		Swing	−7.0	

General election 1992: Henley
Party	Candidate	Votes	%	±%
Conservative	Michael Heseltine	30,835	59.7	−1.4
Liberal Democrats	David G. Turner	12,443	24.1	−2.2
Labour	Ivan J. Russell-Swinnerton	7,676	14.9	+2.3
Independent	Alan S. Plane	431	0.8	New
Natural Law	Sara A. Banerji	274	0.5	New
Majority		18,392	35.6	+0.8
Turnout		51,659	79.8	+4.8
Conservative hold		Swing	+0.4	

=== Elections in the 1980s ===
General election 1987: Henley
Party	Candidate	Votes	%	±%
Conservative	Michael Heseltine	29,978	61.1	+1.4
Liberal	John Madeley	12,896	26.3	−3.0
Labour	Michael Barber	6,173	12.6	+3.1
Majority		17,082	34.8	+4.4
Turnout		49,047	75.0	+2.1
Conservative hold		Swing		

General election 1983: Henley
Party	Candidate	Votes	%	±%
Conservative	Michael Heseltine	27,039	59.7	+1.0
Liberal	Ian Brook	13,258	29.3	+6.4
Labour	Iain Roxburgh	4,282	9.5	−9.0
Women for Life On Earth	R. Johnson	517	1.1	New
One Nation Conservative	T. Rogers	213	0.5	New
Majority		13,781	30.4	−5.4
Turnout		45,309	72.9	−5.4
Conservative hold		Swing		

=== Elections in the 1970s ===
General election 1979: Henley
Party	Candidate	Votes	%	±%
Conservative	Michael Heseltine	29,982	58.7	+9.7
Liberal	Steve Atack	11,693	22.9	−3.9
Labour	D. J. Whiting	9,435	18.5	−5.8
Majority		18,289	35.8	+13.6
Turnout		51,110	77.5	+4.0
Conservative hold		Swing		

General election October 1974: Henley
Party	Candidate	Votes	%	±%
Conservative	Michael Heseltine	22,504	49.0	+0.6
Liberal	S. R. C. Evans	12,288	26.8	−3.9
Labour	I. M. Haig	11,141	24.3	+3.4
Majority		10,216	22.2	+4.5
Turnout		45,933	73.5	−7.8
Conservative hold		Swing		

General election February 1974: Henley
Party	Candidate	Votes	%	±%
Conservative	Michael Heseltine	24,367	48.4	
Liberal	S. R. C. Evans	15,467	30.7	
Labour	A. Alexander	10,500	20.9	
Majority		8,900	17.7	
Turnout		50,334	81.3	
Conservative hold		Swing		

General election 1970: Henley
Party	Candidate	Votes	%	±%
Conservative	John Hay	33,452	53.4	−2.0
Labour	Maeve Judith Denby	19,310	30.8	−13.8
Liberal	Arthur William Giles	8,907	14.2	New
Anti-Common Market	Daniel Brunner	960	1.5	New
Majority		14,142	22.6	+11.8
Turnout		62,629	74.0	−1.2
Conservative hold		Swing		

=== Elections in the 1960s ===
General election 1966: Henley
Party	Candidate	Votes	%	±%
Conservative	John Hay	28,994	55.4	+6.2
Labour	George Cunningham	23,320	44.6	+11.8
Majority		5,674	10.8	−5.6
Turnout		52,314	75.2	−3.1
Conservative hold		Swing		

General election 1964: Henley
Party	Candidate	Votes	%	±%
Conservative	John Hay	24,898	49.2	−4.2
Labour Co-op	Arthur Ledger	16,614	32.8	−0.1
Liberal	Arthur William Giles	9,081	18.0	+4.3
Majority		8,284	16.4	−4.1
Turnout		50,593	78.3	−0.1
Conservative hold		Swing		

=== Elections in the 1950s ===
General election 1959: Henley
Party	Candidate	Votes	%	±%
Conservative	John Hay	24,417	53.4	−5.2
Labour Co-op	Arthur Ledger	15,014	32.9	−8.5
Liberal	Frederick Charles Truman	6,261	13.7	New
Majority		9,403	20.5	+3.3
Turnout		45,692	78.4	+3.0
Conservative hold		Swing		

General election 1955: Henley
Party	Candidate	Votes	%	±%
Conservative	John Hay	24,061	58.6	+0.6
Labour	Nora J T Wiles	16,980	41.4	−0.6
Majority		7,081	17.2	+1.2
Turnout		41,041	75.4	−2.9
Conservative hold		Swing		

General election 1951: Henley
Party	Candidate	Votes	%	±%
Conservative	John Hay	23,621	58.0	+8.6
Labour	Constantine Gallop	17,090	42.0	+6.5
Majority		6,531	16.0	+2.1
Turnout		40,711	78.3	−3.4
Conservative hold		Swing		

General election 1950: Henley
Party	Candidate	Votes	%	±%
Conservative	John Hay	20,488	49.4	
Labour	Alan Hawkins	14,709	35.5	
Liberal	Peter Minoprio	6,255	15.1	
Majority		5,779	13.9	
Turnout		41,452	81.7	
Conservative hold		Swing		

=== Elections in the 1940s ===
General election 1945: Henley
Party	Candidate	Votes	%	±%
Conservative	Gifford Fox	22,286	42.5	−27.9
Labour	James Stewart Cook	19,457	37.1	New
Liberal	Lionel Brett	10,718	20.4	−9.2
Majority		2,829	5.4	−35.4
Turnout		52,461	66.3	+9.4
Conservative hold		Swing		

=== Elections in the 1930s ===
General election 1935: Henley
Party	Candidate	Votes	%	±%
Conservative	Gifford Fox	22,024	70.4	−1.8
Liberal	John Herbert May	9,254	29.6	+13.3
Majority		12,770	40.8	−15.1
Turnout		31,278	56.9	−11.7
Conservative hold		Swing	+1.0	

1932 Henley by-election
Party	Candidate	Votes	%	±%
Conservative	Gifford Fox	16,553	69.9	−2.3
Liberal	Richard Matthews	7,129	30.1	+13.8
Majority		9,424	39.8	−16.1
Turnout		23,682	48.9	−19.7
Conservative hold		Swing	−8.05	

General election 1931: Henley
Party	Candidate	Votes	%	±%
Conservative	Robert Henderson	24,015	72.2	+20.3
Liberal	Richard Matthews	5,411	16.3	−13.6
Labour	Frederick J Hembury	3,809	11.5	−6.7
Majority		18,604	55.9	+33.9
Turnout		33,235	68.6	−4.7
Conservative hold		Swing	+16.95	

=== Elections in the 1920s ===
General election 1929: Henley
Party	Candidate	Votes	%	±%
Unionist	Robert Henderson	16,943	51.9	−12.9
Liberal	Geoffrey Tritton	9,786	29.9	−5.3
Labour	Bernard Benjamin Gillis	5,962	18.2	New
Majority		7,157	22.0	−7.6
Turnout		32,691	73.3	+3.1
Registered electors		44,624		
Unionist hold		Swing	−3.8	

General election 1924: Henley
Party	Candidate	Votes	%	±%
Unionist	Robert Henderson	14,830	64.8	+13.0
Liberal	Charles Alan Bennett	8,060	35.2	−13.0
Majority		6,770	29.6	+26.0
Turnout		22,890	70.2	−3.1
Registered electors		32,613		
Unionist hold		Swing	+13.0	

Sir Henry Rew

General election 1923: Henley
Party	Candidate	Votes	%	±%
Unionist	Reginald Terrell	12,092	51.8	−1.3
Liberal	R. Henry Rew	11,266	48.2	+1.3
Majority		826	3.6	−2.6
Turnout		23,358	73.3	+3.7
Registered electors		31,873		
Unionist hold		Swing	−1.3	

General election 1922: Henley
Party	Candidate	Votes	%	±%
Unionist	Reginald Terrell	11,545	53.1	−14.6
Liberal	R. Henry Rew	10,204	46.9	+14.6
Majority		1,341	6.2	−29.2
Turnout		21,749	69.6	+17.4
Registered electors		31,246		
Unionist hold		Swing	−14.6	

=== Elections in the 1910s ===
General election 1918: Henley
Party		Candidate	Votes	%	±%
C	Unionist	Reginald Terrell	10,757	67.7	+8.6
	Liberal	Edmund Loftus MacNaghten	5,138	32.3	−8.6
Majority			5,619	35.4	+17.2
Turnout			15,895	52.2	−33.6
Registered electors			30,457		
	Unionist hold		Swing	+8.6	
C indicates candidate endorsed by the coalition government.

1917 Henley by-election
Party	Candidate	Votes	%	±%
Unionist	Robert Hermon-Hodge	Unopposed		
Unionist hold				

General election December 1910: Henley
Party	Candidate	Votes	%	±%
Conservative	Valentine Fleming	5,340	59.1	+0.8
Liberal	G.C.N. Nicholson	3,701	40.9	−0.8
Majority		1,639	18.2	+1.6
Turnout		9,041	85.8	−6.2
Registered electors		10,536		
Conservative hold		Swing	+0.8	

General election January 1910: Henley
Party	Candidate	Votes	%	±%
Conservative	Valentine Fleming	5,649	58.3	+11.3
Liberal	Philip Morrell	4,046	41.7	−11.3
Majority		1,603	16.6	N/A
Turnout		9,695	92.0	+4.4
Registered electors		10,536		
Conservative gain from Liberal		Swing	+11.3	

=== Elections in the 1900s ===
General election 1906: Henley
Party	Candidate	Votes	%	±%
Liberal	Philip Morrell	4,562	53.0	+4.2
Conservative	Robert Hermon-Hodge	4,050	47.0	−4.2
Majority		512	6.0	N/A
Turnout		8,612	87.6	+9.4
Registered electors		9,828		
Liberal gain from Conservative		Swing	+4.2	

General election 1900: Henley
Party	Candidate	Votes	%	±%
Conservative	Robert Hermon-Hodge	3,622	51.2	−1.3
Liberal	H. L. Samuel	3,450	48.8	+1.3
Majority		172	2.4	−2.6
Turnout		7,072	78.2	−3.5
Registered electors		9,039		
Conservative hold		Swing	−1.3	

=== Elections in the 1890s ===
General election 1895: Henley
Party	Candidate	Votes	%	±%
Conservative	Robert Hermon-Hodge	3,831	52.5	−0.5
Liberal	Herbert Samuel	3,470	47.5	+0.5
Majority		361	5.0	−1.0
Turnout		7,301	81.7	+2.0
Registered electors		8,932		
Conservative hold		Swing	−0.5	

General election 1892: Henley
Party	Candidate	Votes	%	±%
Conservative	Francis Parker	3,688	53.0	−5.6
Liberal	Walter Phillimore	3,269	47.0	+5.6
Majority		419	6.0	−11.2
Turnout		6,957	79.7	+6.4
Registered electors		8,731		
Conservative hold		Swing	−5.6	

=== Elections in the 1880s ===
General election 1886: Henley
Party	Candidate	Votes	%	±%
Conservative	Francis Parker	3,674	58.6	+4.9
Liberal	Walter Phillimore	2,600	41.4	−4.9
Majority		1,074	17.2	+9.8
Turnout		6,274	73.3	−8.9
Registered electors		8,555		
Conservative hold		Swing	+4.9	

General election 1885: Henley
Party	Candidate	Votes	%	±%
Conservative	Edward Vernon Harcourt	3,778	53.7	
Liberal	Frederick William Maude	3,258	46.3	
Majority		520	7.4	
Turnout		7,036	82.2	
Registered electors		8,555		
Conservative win (new seat)				

== See also ==
- parliamentary constituencies in Oxfordshire
- Boundary Commission for England
  - Fifth Periodic Review of Westminster constituencies
  - First-past-the-post voting
  - History of local government in England
  - Rural districts
  - Urban districts
  - Homogeneity

== Sources ==
- Iain Dale, ed. (2003). The Times House of Commons 1929, 1931, 1935. Politico's (reprint). ISBN 1-84275-033-X.
- "The Times House of Commons 1945", The Times, 1945
- "The Times House of Commons 1950", The Times, 1950
- "The Times House of Commons 1955", The Times, 1955
