= Baron Wyfold =

Extinct barony in the Peerage of the United Kingdom

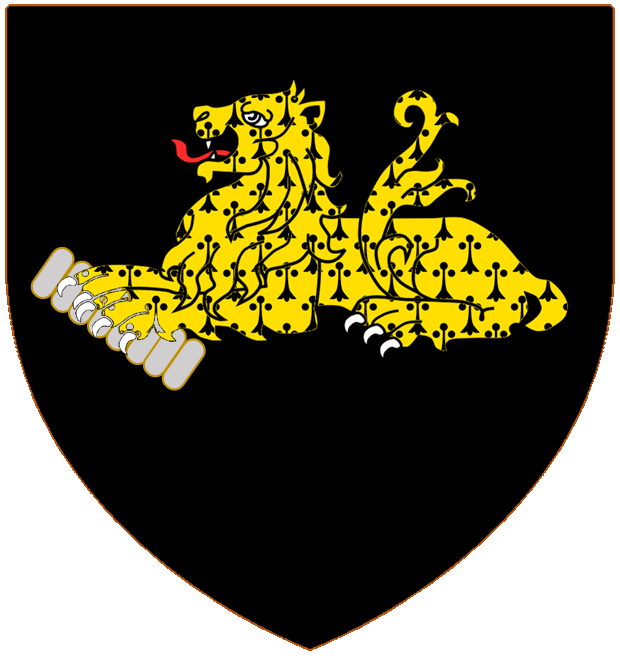
Shield of arms of the Lord Wyfold

Baron Wyfold, of Accrington in the County Palatine of Lancaster, was a title in the Peerage of the United Kingdom. It was created on 17 May 1919 for Sir Robert Hermon-Hodge, 1st Baronet, the former Conservative Member of Parliament for Accrington, Henley and Croydon. He had already been created a baronet, of Wyfold Court in the Parish of Checkendon in the County of Oxford, in the Baronetage of the United Kingdom in 1902. Born Robert Hodge, he assumed in 1903 by Royal licence the additional surname of Hermon, which was that of his father-in-law, Edward Hermon. The titles became extinct on the death of Lord Wyfold's grandson, the third Baron, on 8 April 1999.

== Barons Wyfold (1919) ==
- Robert Trotter Hermon-Hodge, 1st Baron Wyfold (1851–1937)
- Roland Hermon Hermon-Hodge, 2nd Baron Wyfold (1880–1942)
- Hermon Robert Fleming Hermon-Hodge, 3rd Baron Wyfold (1915–1999)

Baronetage of the United Kingdom
Preceded by Henderson baronets	Hermon-Hodge baronets of Wyfold Court; 24 July 1902	Succeeded by Porter baronets
