= 1919 Croydon South by-election =

By-election for the House of Commons

- 14 November 1919
- Turnout: 45.5%
	Uni
Candidate	Allan Smith	Howard Houlder
Party	Unionist	Liberal
Alliance	Coalition
Popular vote	11,777	9,573
Percentage	55.2%	44.8%
Swing	▼16.6%	New
MP before election
Ian Malcolm
Unionist
Subsequent MP
Allan Smith
Unionist

The 1919 Croydon South by-election was a parliamentary by-election for the British House of Commons constituency of Croydon South on 14 November 1919.

== Vacancy ==
The by-election was caused by the resignation of the sitting Unionist MP, Sir Ian Malcolm on 28 October 1919. He had been the MP for Croydon since December 1910.

== Electoral history ==
Croydon was a traditionally strong area for the Unionists. The Croydon constituency was created in 1885 and won by the Unionists at every election. In 1918, it was divided into two seats, and its MP, Ian Malcolm, was elected for the new Croydon South seat. He was helped by the absence of a Liberal opponent and the official support of the Coalition government;

1918 general election: Croydon South
Party		Candidate	Votes	%
C	Unionist	Ian Malcolm	17,813	71.8
	Labour	H. T. Muggeridge	7,006	28.2
Majority			10,807	43.6
Turnout			24,819	55.0
Registered electors				
	Unionist win (new seat)			
C indicates candidate endorsed by the coalition government.

== Candidates ==
- The Unionists selected 49-year-old Sir Allan Smith to defend the seat. He was a solicitor and Chairman of the Management Board of the Engineering and Allied Employers’ National Federation.
- On 30 October, the Croydon Liberal and Radical Association unanimously adopted 60-year-old Alderman Howard Houlder to challenge for the seat. He had not stood for parliament before but been elected to Croydon Council. He served as Mayor of Croydon from 1916 to 1919. He worked for the family shipping business.
- The Labour Party did not run a candidate this time.

== Campaign ==
Polling Day was set for 14 November, just 17 days after the resignation of Malcolm. Close of Nominations occurred on 4 November to reveal a two cornered contest. Smith received official backing from the Coalition Government, while Houlder's candidacy was backed by the Liberal opposition.

== Result ==
There was a big drop in the Unionist majority.

1919 Croydon South by-election
Party		Candidate	Votes	%	±%
C	Unionist	Allan Smith	11,777	55.2	–16.6
	Liberal	Howard Houlder	9,573	44.8	New
Majority			2,204	10.4	−33.2
Turnout			21,359	45.5	−9.5
Registered electors					
	Unionist hold		Swing		
C indicates candidate endorsed by the coalition government.

Sir Allan Smith thought the result "was a victory for the forces of unity".

== Aftermath ==
Smith retained the seat at the following election because the anti-Unionist vote was split when Muggeridge intervened. Houlder did not stand for parliament again. The result at the following General election;

1922 general election: Croydon South
Party	Candidate	Votes	%	±%
Unionist	Allan Smith	15,356	47.3	−24.5
Labour	H.T. Muggeridge	8,942	27.5	−0.7
Liberal	Thomas Dobson	8,183	25.2	N/A
Majority		6,414	19.8	−23.8
Turnout		32,481	66.4	+11.4
Registered electors				
Unionist hold		Swing	-11.9	

== See also ==
- List of United Kingdom by-elections
- United Kingdom by-election records
