= Archibald Hall =

Scottish serial killer (1924–2002)

Archibald Thomson Hall
- Born: Archibald Thomson Hall; 17 June 1924; Glasgow, Scotland
- Died: 16 September 2002 (aged 78); HMP Kingston, Portsmouth, England
- Other names: Roy Fontaine; Killer Butler; Monster Butler
- Conviction: Murder
- Penalty: Life Imprisonment

Details
- Victims: 5
- Span of crimes: 1977–1978
- Date apprehended: 16 January 1978

Archibald Thomson Hall, also known as Roy Fontaine (17 June 1924 – 16 September 2002) was a Scottish serial killer and thief. Born in Glasgow, Scotland, he became known as the Killer Butler or the Monster Butler after committing crimes while working in service to members of the British aristocracy. At the time of his death, he was the oldest person serving a whole life tariff in prison.

== Criminal activities ==
Hall's criminal career began as a thief at the age of 15. He soon progressed to housebreaking. Capitalising on his bisexuality, he then infiltrated the gay scene in London, after moving there with the profits of his criminal ventures. He served his first jail sentence for attempting to sell jewellery in London that he had stolen in Scotland. During his sentence, he studied antiques and learned the etiquette of the aristocracy, as well as taking elocution lessons to soften his Scottish accent.

Upon his release he began using the name Roy Fontaine, after the actress Joan Fontaine, and worked as a butler, occasionally returning to prison for further jewel thefts. He married and divorced during this time.

In 1975, Hall was released from prison and returned to Scotland. He began working as butler to Margaret ('Peggy'), Lady Hudson, a dowager (widow of Sir Austin Hudson, 1st Baronet, a Conservative member of parliament) who lived at Kirtleton House, Dumfriesshire. Hall had initially planned to steal her valuables but he never carried this out when he realised that he liked both his job and employer too much.

When David Wright, an acquaintance from his last prison term, was also given a job on the estate as a gamekeeper in 1977, the two had an altercation after Wright stole some of Lady Hudson's jewellery and threatened to tell her about Hall's own criminal past if Hall reported him.

Hall took Wright on a rabbit hunt in a trick attempt at coming to an amicable solution. Once out in the fields, he shot Wright dead and buried him next to the stream in the Kirtleton House grounds.

Hall soon left his job after Lady Hudson discovered his criminal past. Based in London again, he combined more thieving and racketeering with working as a butler to the 82-year-old Walter Scott-Elliot and his 60-year-old wife Dorothy. Scott-Elliot had been the Labour MP for Accrington from 1945 to 1950, was wealthy and from an aristocratic Scottish background. Hall's plan was to rob the couple of their money and retire, but in the end, he killed both of them after Dorothy Scott-Elliot walked in on Hall and an accomplice, Michael Kitto, as the two men were discussing their plans.

Kitto's first murder was when he immediately put a pillow over Scott-Elliot's mouth and suffocated her.

Hall and Kitto then drugged her husband and drove them both up to Scotland, helped by the Scott-Elliots' housekeeper Mary Coggle. After they buried Dorothy in Braco, Perthshire, they strangled and beat her sedated husband with a shovel and buried him in woods near Tomich, Inverness-shire.

Their next victim was Coggle, who had taken to wearing Dorothy's expensive clothes and jewellery and was drawing too much attention to herself. After she refused to dispose of a fur coat which was potentially incriminating evidence, Hall and Kitto killed her with a poker and left her body in a stream near Middlebie, Dumfriesshire, where she was discovered on 25 December 1977 by a shepherd.

The final victim of the pair was Hall's half-brother Donald, a paedophile recently released from prison, whom Hall hated. Hall and Kitto found Donald at Hall's holiday home in Cumbria, and, telling him that their next robbery was going to be a tie-up job, tricked him into letting them practise on him. Once Donald was tied up, Hall used chloroform to incapacitate him before drowning him in the bath. The abortive effort to dispose of his body led to Hall and Kitto's downfall.

== Arrest ==
Hall and Kitto placed Donald's body in the boot of a car and again drove to Scotland to carry out another burial. However, Hall had made Kitto replace the car's number plate which contained three 9s, because he believed it was unlucky: this meant the tax disc and the number plate did not match. The wintry weather made driving hazardous, and so on reaching North Berwick in East Lothian, they decided to check into the Blenheim House Hotel on the north side of the High Street overnight to lessen their chances of being in an accident.

However, the shifty movements of Hall and Kitto made the hotelier suspicious and, worried about whether he would be paid for their stay, he called the police as a precaution. When they arrived, they realised the tax disc and number plate did not match and took Kitto and Hall in for questioning. They then took the car to the police station (only 200 yards away, and on the same side of the High Street) where they made the discovery of Donald's body in the boot.

Kitto was arrested but Hall escaped through a lavatory window. He was captured at a police roadblock in nearby Haddington.

The police then made a connection between Hall's car and the registration number of a vehicle noted by a suspicious antiques dealer in Newcastle-under-Lyme, to whom two men had offered silver and china at a price well below its true value. The police traced the car to the Scott-Elliots' address in London and found the apartment robbed of many valuables and spattered with blood. This is also linked with the murder of Coggle, whose body had already been found and who had been previously registered as a housekeeper for the Scott-Elliots. The police had evidence that three men (including a drugged Scott-Elliot) and a woman had stayed at a Scottish hotel for one night, but the following night only two men – Hall and Kitto – returned.

Hall survived a suicide attempt while in custody, before revealing the whereabouts of the three buried victims. In deep snow and bitterly cold weather, and with the media watching, police teams dug up the bodies of David Wright and Walter and Dorothy Scott-Elliot. They charged Hall and Kitto with five murders.

== Imprisonment and death ==
Hall was convicted at courts in London and Edinburgh of four murders – the murder of Dorothy Scott-Elliot was ordered to lie on file – and sentenced to life imprisonment. In Scotland, it was recommended that he serve a minimum of 15 years and in England, the judge handed down a recommendation that he never be released.

Kitto was given life imprisonment for three murders, with no recommended minimum in Scotland and a 15-year minimum in England. Police said in evidence that Kitto was, in a perverted way, fortunate to be able to go on trial, as Hall was planning to kill him too.

Successive home secretaries put Hall on the list of dangerous prisoners who should serve a whole life tariff, which unlike some criminals on the list did not alter Hall's prison status at all, as it reciprocated the tariff set by one of his judges. When politically set tariffs were declared illegal by the law lords and the European Court of Human Rights, Hall's status as a prisoner unlikely to be released never changed, despite his being the oldest prisoner on the published list. In 1995, The Observer newspaper published a letter from Hall in which he requested the right to die. He made numerous suicide attempts.

Hall published his autobiography, A Perfect Gentleman, in 1999. He died of a stroke in Kingston Prison, Portsmouth, in 2002 at the age of 78. By this date, he was one of the oldest of more than 70,000 prisoners in British prisons, and the oldest to be serving a whole life tariff.

== Film ==
The Ladies Man: Archibald Hall is a 1993 British television film based on the story of Archibald Hall starring John Shrapnel as Hall.

In 2005, British actor Malcolm McDowell and Hollywood screenwriter Peter Bellwood announced that they were seeking a director and funding for a film based on Hall's life. In 2011, McDowell stated the film was currently being made and would be named Monster Butler. After some production work had taken place, the film was cancelled because of lack of funding, leaving some crew members unpaid.

== See also ==
- List of serial killers in the United Kingdom
