= Association of Community Enterprises in the Highlands and Islands =

Non-profit organisation that no longer exists today

The Association of Community Enterprises in the Highlands and Islands (ACE-HI) was established in 1985, as a membership organisation to support the development and growth of community co-operatives and community enterprises in the Highlands and Islands of Scotland.

== Origins ==
ACE-HI was formally established at a meeting held in Co-Chomunn Stafainn (Staffin Community Co-operative) on the Isle of Skye in October 1985, attended by 50 people including representatives from 14 community co-operatives along with other organisations and supporters of the movement in the Highlands and Islands.

As a membership organisation, ACE-HI was directed by a ten-member management committee, with representatives from community enterprises in the Western Isles, Orkney, Shetland, and the Highland mainland. The committee met for the first time on 8th December 1985 and aimed to:

- provide support and training for existing community enterprises and communities interested in setting up similar initiatives, by advising management committees, members and staff
- publicise and promote the community enterprise movement in the Highlands and Islands of Scotland
- establish an information and resource bank for individual community enterprises
- improve communication and the exchange of information and knowledge between community enterprises.

== History ==
Co-operation has a long tradition in the UK, with organisations such as the Co-operative Wholesale Society (CWS) established in the 19th century. In the 1970s the passing of the Industrial Common Ownership Act (1976) and the Co-operative Development Agency Act (1978) resulted in the number of workers’ co-operatives growing from 300 in 1980 to 900 in 1984. In a further example of renewed interest in co-operative activity, in 1977 the Highlands and Islands Development Board (HIDB) - the economic and community development agency for the Highlands and Islands of Scotland (https://www.hie.co.uk) - launched a Community Co-operative Scheme. This scheme was designed to encourage and support local communities to create co-operative enterprises to exploit economic opportunity, create jobs and improve local services. Community enterprises shared comparable aims to community co-operatives -to develop community-led economic activity- but were established as companies limited by guarantee with an asset lock, rather than using a co-operative organisational structure.

By 1985, 23 community enterprises, owned and controlled by their respective local communities, had been set up across the Highlands and Islands. They engaged in a wide variety of businesses ranging from general stores, agricultural and building supplies, fish farming, crafts, and tourism. In 1986 it was reported that they had a combined turnover of £3 million with over 250 individuals working in them, over half in permanent or regular jobs and the remainder engaged in outworking or seasonal work.

Support for community co-operatives through the HIDB scheme included a package of advice and financial assistance and a team of field officers to support communities to form boards and plan the activities of the community co-ops. In 1983, the field officer roles were discontinued and ACE-HI was established in response to this change. The creation of ACE-HI was also a step towards the community enterprise movement's longer-term aim of self-reliance and non-dependence on state funding.

== Functions ==
=== Training ===
ACE-HI identified the training needs for community enterprises’ management committees, managers and staff, and, in conjunction with the Scottish-based APT Partnership, ACE-HI developed a range of training materials designed specifically for community enterprises. From 1988 to 1991 the funding for this programme came from the European Social Fund with a matching contribution from the HIDB. This enabled training for 70 community enterprise staff and management committee members in 8 community enterprises and aimed to improve business methods and identify new areas for development.

=== RURTEL ===
Maintaining communication between ACE-HI staff and members was hugely challenging in the Highlands and Islands. The most northerly community enterprise being in Fetlar, Shetland and most southerly in the Isle of Bute in the Firth of Clyde, with a distance of 400 miles between them. To address this, in March 1987, ACE-HI joined Rurtel, an Arkleton Trust project testing early computer conferencing technology which had been developed by the University of Guelph, Canada. A pilot scheme was introduced in Orkney in 1988, meaning that community co-operatives in Hoy, Eday and Papa Westray received a loan of a business computer to evaluate its use and potential for linking the Orkney community co-operatives with one another and the Orkney Development Officer. The use of this computer communications system placed ACE-HI at the forefront of demonstrating the potential benefits of information and computer technology for rural areas in the UK.

== Structure and funding ==
Between 1987 and 1990, ACE-HI experienced significant growth, and moved its base from Dingwall to Invergordon with ten full-time staff based in five regions across the Highlands and Islands. During this time ACE-HI received funding from a variety of sources including the HIDB, the European Social Fund, local authorities, and BP (British Petroleum - for activities in Shetland). While the HIDB maintained funding for ACE-HI, a management review recommended that the organisation should separate its membership-oriented functions from service delivery. A subsidiary company, ACE-TEC, was established to pursue the growing opportunities to contract with public sector organisations for training and consultancy services.

== Managed decline and closure ==
Much of ACE-HI’s training work was supported by the EU’s LEADER and EUROFORM programmes. Despite this external funding, ACE-HI struggled to generate enough income to cover core costs, with the financial fragility of many of the rural community enterprises precluding them from contributing to the cost of receiving ACE-HI services. While time-limited European project funding continued, core funding and cash flow challenges put the organisation in a perilous position, and in 1996 the board of ACE-HI placed the organisation into voluntary administration, ending 11 years of operation.

== Legacy ==
For over a decade, ACE-HI provided support and assistance to community enterprises in the Highlands and Islands. Many of the early HIDB co-ops are still in existence, over 40 years since they first opened, involved in a wide range of activities, including, most recently, community owned and managed land and renewable energy projects. These community-led and owned enterprises in the Highlands and Islands of Scotland reflect a continued commitment by local people to secure a more viable and sustainable future for their communities. Many of these current initiatives can be traced back to the knowledge and experience acquired through the HIDB’s early community co-operative scheme and the follow up work of ACE-HI and its support programme.
