= Thomas Dobson (politician) =

Dobson in 1906

Thomas William Dobson JP (9 November 1853 – 13 May 1935) was a coal merchant and Liberal Member of Parliament (MP) representing Plymouth from 1906 to 1910.

== Background ==
Dobson was born the son of Thomas and Maria Dobson of Hackney. He was educated at Congregational School, Hackney. In 1875 he married Caroline Jane Potterveld of Hackney. He settled in Park Hill Road, Croydon.

== Professional career ==
Dobson was the senior partner in the firm of Godson & Dobson, coal and timber merchants of Croydon.

== Political career ==
Dobson was a member of Croydon School Board from 1879 to 1885. He was a member of Croydon Council from 1885 to 1905. He served as a Justice of the peace in Croydon. He was Liberal candidate for the Plymouth division of Devon at the 1906 General Election. He introduced and carried in Parliament, Willett's Daylight Saving Bill. He did not seek re-election at Plymouth at the following general election in January 1910. He was chosen as Liberal candidate for the 1912 Nottingham East by-election. This was a Conservative seat, however he managed to reduce the Unionist majority at the by-election. He switched back contest the new seat of Plymouth Drake at the 1918 election. However, the Coalition government endorsement went to his Tory opponent and he came second. He then switched to contest Croydon South, his own local constituency, in 1922, not a promising seat and finished in third place. He did not stand for parliament again.

=== Electoral record ===
General election 1906: Plymouth
Party	Candidate	Votes	%	±%
Liberal	Thomas Dobson	9,021	29.4	+5.4
Liberal	Charles Mallet	8,914	29.0	+5.8
Conservative	Henry Duke	6,547	21.3	−5.1
Conservative	H G Smith	6,234	20.3	−6.1
Majority		2,367	7.7	n/a
Turnout			85.3	+0.5
Registered electors		18,196		
Liberal gain from Conservative		Swing	+5.3	
Liberal gain from Conservative		Swing	+6.0	

1912 Nottingham East by-election
Party	Candidate	Votes	%	±%
Unionist	John Rees	6,482	55.7	−0.9
Liberal	Thomas Dobson	5,158	44.3	+0.9
Majority		1,324	11.4	−1.8
Turnout		11,640	83.9	+0.1
Registered electors		13,866		
Unionist hold		Swing	−0.9	

General election 1918: Plymouth Drake
Party		Candidate	Votes	%	±%
C	Unionist	Arthur Benn	17,188	73.4	
	Liberal	Thomas Dobson	6,225	26.6	
Majority			10,963	46.8	
Turnout			23,413		
	Unionist win (new seat)				
C indicates candidate endorsed by the coalition government.

1922 General Election:Croydon South
Party	Candidate	Votes	%	±%
Unionist	Allan Smith	15,356	47.3	−24.5
Labour	H.T. Muggeridge	8,942	27.5	−0.7
Liberal	Thomas Dobson	8,183	25.2	n/a
Majority		6,414	19.8	−23.8
Turnout		32,481	66.4	+11.4
Registered electors		48,904		
Unionist hold		Swing	−11.9	

Parliament of the United Kingdom
Preceded by Henry Duke and Ivor Guest	Member of Parliament for Plymouth; 1906 – Jan 1910; With: Charles Mallet	Succeeded by Aneurin Williams and Charles Mallet
