= 1932 Croydon South by-election =

UK parliamentary by-election

The 1932 Croydon South by-election was a by-election held on 9 February 1932 for the British House of Commons constituency of Croydon South in Surrey.

== Vacancy ==
The seat had become vacant when the Conservative Member of Parliament (MP), Sir William Mitchell-Thomson had been elevated to the peerage as Baron Selsdon. He had held the seat since the 1923 general election.

== Candidates ==
The Conservative candidate was Herbert Williams, who had been MP for Reading until his defeat at the 1929 general election.

His only opponent was the Labour Party candidate, Rudolph Putnam Messel, who had contested South Molton in 1929 and 1931.

The local Liberal association, who had polled a strong third in 1929 but had not stood in 1931 selected barrister Alun Llewellyn to run as their candidate. However, a week later, Llewellyn decided to withdraw. He did contest the seat at the subsequent general election.

== Result ==
On a low turnout, the result was a victory for Williams: a swing of 12.8% to Labour merely reduced the Conservative majority from huge to large. He was re-elected in 1935, but defeated at the 1945 general election.

Croydon South by-election, 9 February 1932
Party	Candidate	Votes	%	±%
Conservative	Herbert Williams	19,126	67.5	−12.8
Labour	Rudolph Putnam Messel	9,189	32.5	+12.8
Majority		9,937	35.0	−25.6
Turnout		28,315	38.2	−30.1
Conservative hold		Swing	−12.8	

== See also ==
- Croydon South constituency
- 1919 Croydon South by-election
- Croydon
- List of United Kingdom by-elections (1931–1950)

== Sources ==
- Craig, F. W. S. (1983) [1969]. British parliamentary election results 1918–1949 (3rd ed.). Chichester: Parliamentary Research Services. ISBN 0-900178-06-X.
- Leigh Rayment's Historical List of MPs – Constituencies beginning with "C" (part 6)
