= Ian Malcolm (politician) =

British politician

Sir Ian Malcolm KCMG
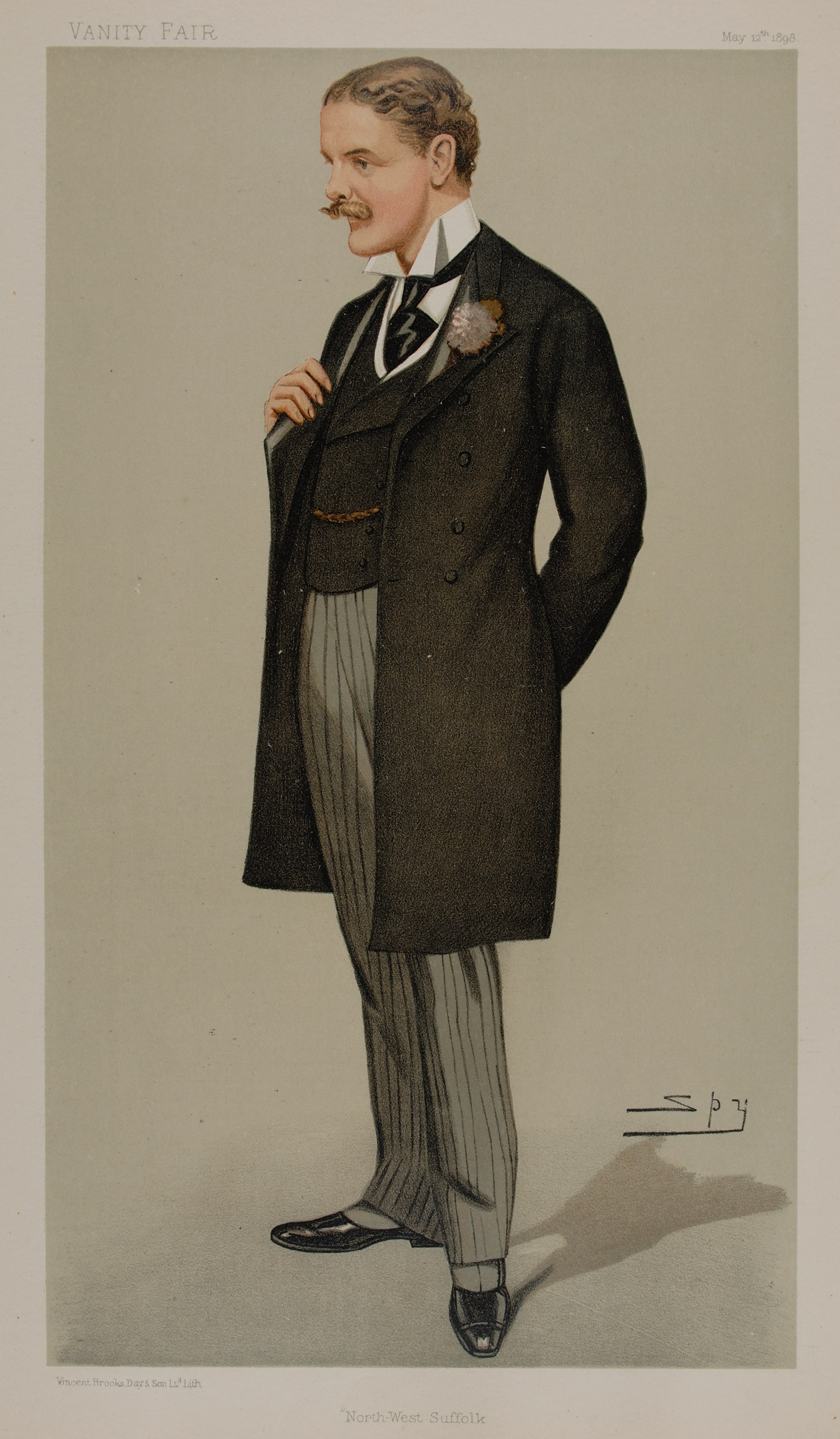
- Malcolm as caricatured by Spy (Leslie Ward) in Vanity Fair, May 1898

Member of Parliament for Croydon South Croydon (1910–1918)
- In office 19 December 1910 – 28 October 1919
- Preceded by: Robert Hermon-Hodge
- Succeeded by: Allan Smith

Member of Parliament for Stowmarket
- In office 7 August 1895 – 8 February 1906
- Preceded by: Sydney Stern
- Succeeded by: George Hardy

Personal details
- Born: Ian Zachary Malcolm; 3 September 1868
- Died: 28 December 1944 (aged 76)
- Party: Conservative
- Spouse: Jeanne Langtry
- Relations: John Malcolm (Uncle)
- Children: 4, including Mary
- Parent: Edward Donald Malcolm (father)

Sir Ian Zachary Malcolm, 17th Laird of Poltalloch, KCMG (3 September 1868 – 28 December 1944) was a Conservative Member of Parliament and Chieftain of the Clan Malcolm/MacCallum.

== Early life and career ==
Malcolm was born in 1868, the son of Colonel Edward Donald Malcolm, 16th of Poltalloch (1837–1930). His father's elder brother was Conservative politician John Wingfield Malcolm, Baron Malcolm of Poltalloch (1833–1902), who died childless and left the Malcolm estate to his brother Edward, from whom it came to Sir Ian on his father's death in 1930.

He was educated at St Peter's School, York, Eton College and New College, Oxford.

== Political career ==
Malcolm served as a Justice of the Peace (Argyll, 1898) and as MP for Stowmarket from 1895 to 1906, Croydon from 1910 to 1918 and Croydon South from 1918 to 1919. His Labour opponent in the 1918 General Election was H.T. Muggeridge, the father of Malcolm Muggeridge.

Malcolm held many diplomatic and political appointments. He travelled extensively in British India in 1901 to 1902; visited the North-West Frontier Province and Rajputana! and accompanied Lord Curzon of Kedleston, Viceroy of India, on his tour through Burma in late 1901. He was a British Red Cross Officer during the First World War in France, Switzerland, Russia and the United States. In April to May 1917 he was a member of the Balfour Mission, which was intended to promote co-operation between the United States and the United Kingdom during the First World War. He was private secretary to Arthur Balfour at the Paris Peace Conference in 1919, when he was appointed a Knight Commander of the Order of St Michael and St George (KCMG).

== Personal life ==
On 30 June 1902 at St. Margaret's, Westminster, he married Jeanne Marie Langtry, daughter of Lillie Langtry, the famous actress. Breaking all tradition, the bride was given away by her mother. Unfortunately, Malcolm's family was far from impressed by their new daughter-in-law's mother—it is likely they were highly aware that Jeanne Marie's father was not Lillie Langtry's first husband, Edward Langtry, but Prince Louis of Battenberg.

Lillie saw less and less of her daughter. Jeanne and Sir Ian lived alternately in a house in Belgravia, London, or at the Malcolm's family seat at Poltalloch in Scotland.

They had four children: George Ian (who later succeeded as 18th Laird of Poltalloch) (1903–1976); Victor Neill (the first husband of the actress Ann Todd) (1905–1977) and Angus Christian Edward (1908–1971); and Helen Mary (1918–2010). Mary later became one of the first two female announcers on the BBC Television Service (now BBC One) from 1948 to 1956, during which time she became a household name in the UK. She died on 13 October 2010 at the age of 92.

== Publications ==
Sir Ian was the author of a number of books, including: A Persian Pastoral (poetry), Highland Lore and Legend, Paraphrased by I. Malcolm (in verse), Indian Pictures and Problems, Lord Balfour, Poets at Play (parodies), Songs of the Clachan, Stuff and Nonsense: a book of war verses, The Calendar of Empire, other essays: Vacant Thrones, Verses for Music, and War Pictures behind the Lines.

He also edited Convicted, a record of disloyal speeches, resolutions, leaflets and posters, published in Ireland and the USA between 1880 and 1911.

Parliament of the United Kingdom
Preceded by Sydney Stern	Member of Parliament for Stowmarket; 1895–1906	Succeeded by George Hardy
Preceded by Robert Hermon-Hodge	Member of Parliament for Croydon; Dec. 1910 – 1918	Constituency abolished
New constituency	Member of Parliament for Croydon South; 1918–1919	Succeeded by Allan Smith
