= Croydon South (constituency) =

UK Parliament constituency (since 1974)

Coordinates: 51.331°N 0.098°W

- Borough constituency for the House of Commons
- Interactive map of boundaries from 2024
- Boundary within Greater London
- County: Greater London
- Electorate: 71,541 (March 2020)
- Major settlements: Coulsdon, Purley, South Croydon

Current constituency
- Created: 1974
- Member of Parliament: Chris Philp (Conservative)
- Seats: One
- Created from: East Surrey

Croydon South
- Former borough constituency for the House of Commons
- Boundary of Croydon South in Surrey for the 1970 general election
- County: Surrey until 1965, then Greater London

1955–1974
- Seats: One
- Created from: Croydon East and Croydon West
- Replaced by: Croydon Central (bulk); Croydon South (small portion)

1918–1950
- Seats: One
- Type of constituency: Borough constituency
- Created from: Croydon
- Replaced by: Croydon East and Croydon West

Croydon South is a constituency created in 1974 and represented in the House of Commons of the UK Parliament since 2015 by Chris Philp, a Conservative. A constituency also named Croydon South but with entirely different boundaries originally existed from 1918 to 1950 and 1955 to 1974.

== History ==
Croydon South was first created under the Representation of the People Act 1918 when the existing Parliamentary Borough of Croydon was split between North and South divisions. Under the Representation of the People Act 1948, which came into effect for the 1950 general election, the seat was abolished as the County Borough of Croydon was split between Croydon East and Croydon West. The seat was then re-established for the 1955 general election when Croydon was split into three parliamentary seats - North East, North West and South.

In 1965, the County Borough was combined with the Coulsdon and Purley Urban District to form the London Borough of Croydon. However, this local government reorganisation was not reflected in the parliamentary boundaries until the February 1974 election. Under the Second Periodic Review of Westminster constituencies, the existing Croydon South constituency was effectively replaced by Croydon Central. A reconfigured Croydon South constituency was formed, primarily comprising the area which constituted the former Urban District of Coulsdon and Purley, which had previously formed the majority of the East Surrey constituency.

The seat has continued in existence since 1974 with relatively minor boundary changes.

== Political history ==
A seat called "Croydon South" was first created for the 1918 general election when the County Borough of Croydon had grown so the Croydon seat was split into two seats. The first MP was Ian Malcolm, who had been the MP for all of Croydon. H.T. Muggeridge, father of Malcolm Muggeridge, fought the seat for Labour four times from 1918, later becoming MP for Romford. The seat saw a by-election in 1932, won by Herbert Williams.

From 1950 until 1955 the seat was divided into east and west, represented by Conservatives Herbert Williams and Richard Thompson respectively.

Croydon South had twice seen Croydon's only Labour MPs before the 1990s. David Rees-Williams held the seat from the 1945 Labour landslide until unfavourable boundary changes in 1950. David Winnick won the seat in 1966 before losing in 1970. Otherwise the seat, and indeed the rest of Croydon, had always been firm Conservative territory.

In 1974 a fresh seat of Croydon South was created to the south predominantly from the northwestern part of East Surrey, covering Purley and Coulsdon, which had become parts of Greater London in 1965, rather than from the historic Croydon South. The pre-1974 Croydon South was renamed to Croydon Central.

Since 1974, the constituency has been represented by three Conservative MPs. Sir William Clark, who had represented East Surrey since 1970, won the new seat in February 1974, and held it until his retirement in 1992. His successor, Sir Richard Ottaway, then held the seat until 2015, when he stood down and was succeeded by Chris Philp. The 2015 result made the seat the 145th safest of the Conservative Party's 331 seats by percentage of majority. At the 2015 general election, it was one of the Conservatives' safest seats in Greater London.

The 2023 review of parliamentary constituencies in England made a number of changes to the boundaries of the constituency. An area corresponding to the electoral ward of Waddon (Ward) was removed from the constituency and an area corresponding to the electoral ward of Park Hill and Whitgift (Ward) was added to it. In addition, Selsdon and surroundings were removed from the constituency.

Chris Philp held the seat at the 2024 general election on a substantially reduced majority of just over 2,000, the lowest majority since the seat was created.

== Constituency profile ==
Croydon South is largely suburban in character, including the settlements of Purley, Coulsdon, Sanderstead and Kenley, home to the Kenley Aerodrome. There are substantial green spaces to the south, such as Farthing Downs, Happy Valley and Riddlesdown Common. The southern part of the constituency forms part of the North Downs National Character Area.

Croydon South is a relatively affluent parliamentary constituency, ranking at position 454 for deprivation amongst English constituencies (where 1 is the most deprived constituency and 543 is the least deprived constituency). For constituencies within Greater London, Croydon South ranks at position 67 (where 1 is the most deprived constituency and 75 is the least deprived constituency).

Rail links are good with stations such as South Croydon, Purley and Coulsdon South being situated on the Brighton Main Line with frequent trains to Gatwick Airport and Brighton, as well as commuter services to London Victoria and London Bridge.

Boundary changes before the 2024 election removed both Selsdon and Waddon from the seat and added the Park Hill & Whitgift ward, close to Croydon Town centre.

At the southern end of the constituency, Coulsdon has much in common with the county of Surrey of which it was historically a part until its inclusion in Greater London in 1965.

== Boundaries ==
=== Pre-1974 ===
| Dates | Local authority | Maps | Wards |
|---|---|---|---|
| 1918-1950 | County Borough of Croydon | | Central, East, South, and West. |
| 1955-1974 | County Borough of Croydon | | Addington, Broad Green, Central, Shirley, South, and Waddon. |

In 1965, local government in Greater London was re-organised. This constituency was contained entirely within the new London Borough of Croydon from 1965, but new Constituency Boundaries would not take effect until 1974.

=== Post-1974 ===
| Dates | Local authority | Maps | Wards |
|---|---|---|---|
| 1974–1983 | London Borough of Croydon | | Coulsdon East, Purley, Sanderstead and Selsdon, Sanderstead North, Woodcote and Coulsdon West |
| 1983–1997 | London Borough of Croydon | | Coulsdon East, Croham, Kenley, Purley, Sanderstead, Selsdon, Woodcote and Coulsdon West |
| 1997–2010 | London Borough of Croydon | | Coulsdon East, Croham, Kenley, Purley, Sanderstead, Selsdon, Waddon, Woodcote and Coulsdon West |
| 2010–2024 | London Borough of Croydon | | Coulsdon East, Coulsdon West, Croham, Kenley, Purley, Sanderstead, Selsdon and Ballards, Waddon |
| 2024–present | London Borough of Croydon | | Coulsdon Town, Kenley, Old Coulsdon, Park Hill & Whitgift, Purley & Woodcote, Purley Oaks & Riddlesdown, Sanderstead, South Croydon |

== Members of Parliament ==
=== MPs 1918–1950 ===
| Election | Name | Party | Notes |
|---|---|---|---|
| 1918 | Ian Malcolm | Conservative | Member for Croydon (1910–1918) |
| 1919 by-election | Allan Smith | Conservative | |
| 1923 | William Mitchell-Thomson | Conservative | Raised to the peerage in January 1932 |
| 1932 by-election | Herbert Williams | Conservative | Member for Reading (1924–1929) |
| 1945 | David Rees-Williams | Labour | Contested Croydon West following redistribution |
| 1950 | Constituency abolished | | |

From 1950 to 1955 the seat was divided into Croydon East and Croydon West.

=== MPs 1955–1974 ===
| Election | Name | Party | Notes |
|---|---|---|---|
| 1955 | Richard Thompson | Conservative | Member for Croydon West (1950–1955) |
| 1966 | David Winnick | Labour | |
| 1970 | Richard Thompson | Conservative | |
| Feb 1974 | Constituency abolished: see Croydon Central | | |

=== MPs 1974– ===
| Election | Member | Party | Notes |
|---|---|---|---|
| February 1974 | Sir William Clark | Conservative | Member for East Surrey (1970–1974) |
| 1992 | Richard Ottaway | Conservative | Member for Nottingham North (1983–1987); Shadow Secretary of State for the Environment (2004–2005) |
| 2015 | Chris Philp | Conservative | Chief Secretary to the Treasury (2022); Shadow Leader of the House of Commons (2024); Shadow Home Secretary (2024–present) |

== Election results 1974 to present ==
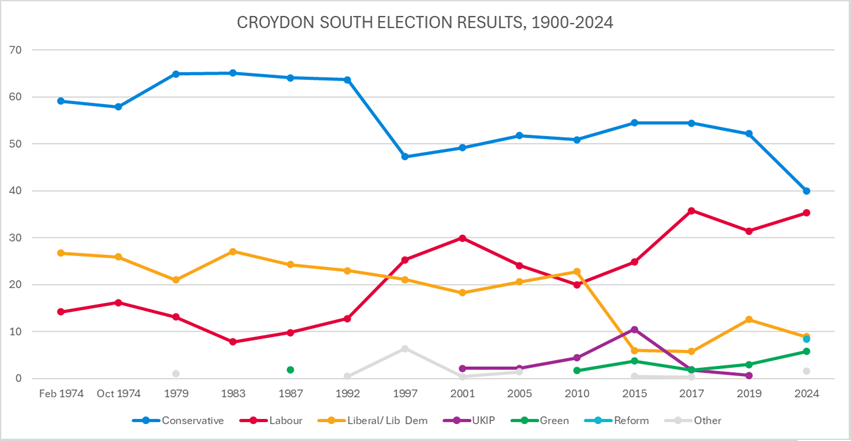
Election results 1974–2024

=== Elections in the 2020s ===
General election 2024: Croydon South
| Party | Candidate | Votes | % | ±% |
|---|---|---|---|---|
| Conservative | Chris Philp | 19,757 | 40.0 | −14.5 |
| Labour | Ben Taylor | 17,444 | 35.3 | +7.2 |
| Liberal Democrats | Richard Howard | 4,384 | 8.9 | −4.6 |
| Reform | Bob Bromley | 4,149 | 8.4 | +8.3 |
| Green | Elaine Garrod | 2,859 | 5.8 | +2.9 |
| Workers Party | Kulsum Hussin | 612 | 1.2 | New |
| Independent | Mark Samuel | 173 | 0.4 | New |
| Majority | | 2,313 | 4.7 | −21.7 |
| Turnout | | 49,378 | 65.9 | −5.2 |
| Registered electors | | 74,968 | | |
| Conservative hold | | Swing | −10.9 | |

=== Elections in the 2010s ===
2019 notional result
| Party | Vote | % |
|---|---|---|
| Conservative | 27,725 | 54.5 |
| Labour | 14,317 | 28.1 |
| Liberal Democrats | 6,885 | 13.5 |
| Green | 1,466 | 2.9 |
| Others | 442 | 0.9 |
| Brexit Party | 59 | 0.1 |
| Turnout | 50,894 | 71.1 |
| Electorate | 71,541 | |

General election 2019: Croydon South
| Party | Candidate | Votes | % | ±% |
|---|---|---|---|---|
| Conservative | Chris Philp | 30,985 | 52.2 | −2.2 |
| Labour | Olga FitzRoy | 18,646 | 31.4 | −4.4 |
| Liberal Democrats | Anna Jones | 7,503 | 12.6 | +6.8 |
| Green | Peter Underwood | 1,782 | 3.0 | +1.2 |
| UKIP | Kathleen Garner | 442 | 0.7 | −1.1 |
| Majority | | 12,339 | 20.8 | +2.2 |
| Turnout | | 59,358 | 70.7 | −2.6 |
| Registered electors | | 83,977 | | |
| Conservative hold | | Swing | +1.1 | |

General election 2017: Croydon South
| Party | Candidate | Votes | % | ±% |
|---|---|---|---|---|
| Conservative | Chris Philp | 33,334 | 54.4 | −0.1 |
| Labour | Jennifer Brathwaite | 21,928 | 35.8 | +11.0 |
| Liberal Democrats | Anna Jones | 3,541 | 5.8 | −0.2 |
| Green | Catherine Shelley | 1,125 | 1.8 | −1.9 |
| UKIP | Kathleen Garner | 1,116 | 1.8 | −8.7 |
| CPA | David Omamogho | 213 | 0.3 | New |
| Majority | | 11,406 | 18.6 | −11.1 |
| Turnout | | 61,247 | 73.3 | +2.9 |
| Registered electors | | 83,518 | | |
| Conservative hold | | Swing | −5.5 | |

General election 2015: Croydon South
| Party | Candidate | Votes | % | ±% |
|---|---|---|---|---|
| Conservative | Chris Philp | 31,448 | 54.5 | +3.6 |
| Labour | Emily Benn | 14,308 | 24.8 | +4.8 |
| UKIP | Kathleen Garner | 6,068 | 10.5 | +6.1 |
| Liberal Democrats | Gill Hickson | 3,448 | 6.0 | −16.8 |
| Green | Peter Underwood | 2,154 | 3.7 | +2.0 |
| Independent | Mark Samuel | 221 | 0.4 | New |
| Class War | Jon Bigger | 65 | 0.1 | New |
| Majority | | 17,140 | 29.7 | +1.6 |
| Turnout | | 57,712 | 70.4 | +1.1 |
| Registered electors | | 82,010 | | |
| Conservative hold | | Swing | −0.6 | |

General election 2010: Croydon South
| Party | Candidate | Votes | % | ±% |
|---|---|---|---|---|
| Conservative | Richard Ottaway | 28,684 | 50.9 | −1.1 |
| Liberal Democrats | Simon Rix | 12,866 | 22.8 | +2.4 |
| Labour | Jane Avis | 11,287 | 20.0 | −4.0 |
| UKIP | Jeffrey Bolter | 2,504 | 4.4 | +2.3 |
| Green | Gordon Ross | 981 | 1.7 | New |
| Majority | | 15,818 | 28.1 | +0.1 |
| Turnout | | 56,322 | 69.3 | +5.8 |
| Registered electors | | 81,303 | | +1,050 |
| Conservative hold | | Swing | –1.7 | |

=== Elections in the 2000s ===
2005 notional result
| Party | Vote | % |
|---|---|---|
| Conservative | 26,478 | 52.0 |
| Labour | 12,250 | 24.1 |
| Liberal Democrats | 10,400 | 20.4 |
| UKIP | 1,104 | 2.2 |
| Others | 682 | 1.3 |
| Turnout | 50,914 | 63.4 |
| Electorate | 80,253 | |

General election 2005: Croydon South
| Party | Candidate | Votes | % | ±% |
|---|---|---|---|---|
| Conservative | Richard Ottaway | 25,320 | 51.8 | +2.6 |
| Labour | Paul Smith | 11,792 | 24.1 | −5.8 |
| Liberal Democrats | Sandra Lawman | 10,049 | 20.6 | +2.3 |
| UKIP | James Feisenberger | 1,054 | 2.2 | 0.0 |
| Veritas | Graham Dare | 497 | 1.0 | New |
| Independent | Mark Samuel | 185 | 0.4 | 0.0 |
| Majority | | 13,528 | 27.7 | +8.4 |
| Turnout | | 48,897 | 63.6 | +2.2 |
| Registered electors | | 75,812 | | |
| Conservative hold | | Swing | +4.2 | |

General election 2001: Croydon South
| Party | Candidate | Votes | % | ±% |
|---|---|---|---|---|
| Conservative | Richard Ottaway | 22,169 | 49.2 | +1.9 |
| Labour | Gerry Ryan | 13,472 | 29.9 | +4.6 |
| Liberal Democrats | Anna-Nicolett Gallop | 8,226 | 18.3 | −2.8 |
| UKIP | Kathleen Garner | 998 | 2.2 | New |
| Independent | Mark Samuel | 195 | 0.4 | +0.2 |
| Majority | | 8,697 | 19.3 | −2.7 |
| Turnout | | 45,060 | 61.4 | −12.1 |
| Registered electors | | 73,372 | | |
| Conservative hold | | Swing | −1.3 | |

=== Elections in the 1990s ===
General election 1997: Croydon South
| Party | Candidate | Votes | % | ±% |
|---|---|---|---|---|
| Conservative | Richard Ottaway | 25,649 | 47.3 | −14.3 |
| Labour | Charlie Burling | 13,719 | 25.3 | +9.0 |
| Liberal Democrats | Steven Gauge | 11,441 | 21.1 | −0.5 |
| Referendum | Tony Barber | 2,631 | 4.9 | New |
| BNP | Paul Ferguson | 354 | 0.7 | New |
| Independent | A.G. Harker | 309 | 0.6 | New |
| Independent | Mark Samuel | 96 | 0.2 | −0.3 |
| Majority | | 11,930 | 22.0 | −18.7 |
| Turnout | | 54,199 | 73.5 | −4.1 |
| Registered electors | | 73,787 | | |
| Conservative hold | | Swing | −11.7 | |

1992 notional result
| Party | Vote | % |
|---|---|---|
| Conservative | 35,937 | 61.7 |
| Liberal Democrats | 12,599 | 21.6 |
| Labour | 9,513 | 16.3 |
| Others | 242 | 0.4 |
| Turnout | 58,291 | 78.0 |
| Electorate | 74,777 | |

General election 1992: Croydon South
| Party | Candidate | Votes | % | ±% |
|---|---|---|---|---|
| Conservative | Richard Ottaway | 31,993 | 63.7 | −0.4 |
| Liberal Democrats | Peter Billenness | 11,568 | 23.0 | −1.3 |
| Labour | Helen Salmon | 6,444 | 12.8 | +3.0 |
| Independent | Mark Samuel | 239 | 0.5 | New |
| Majority | | 20,425 | 40.7 | +0.9 |
| Turnout | | 50,244 | 77.6 | +3.9 |
| Registered electors | | 64,768 | | |
| Conservative hold | | Swing | +0.5 | |

=== Elections in the 1980s ===
General election 1987: Croydon South
| Party | Candidate | Votes | % | ±% |
|---|---|---|---|---|
| Conservative | William Clark | 30,732 | 64.1 | −1.0 |
| Liberal | George Morrison | 11,669 | 24.3 | −2.8 |
| Labour | Geraint Davies | 4,679 | 9.8 | +2.0 |
| Green | Paul Baldwin | 900 | 1.9 | New |
| Majority | | 19,063 | 39.8 | +1.8 |
| Turnout | | 47,980 | 73.7 | +2.6 |
| Registered electors | | 65,085 | | |
| Conservative hold | | Swing | +0.9 | |

General election 1983: Croydon South
| Party | Candidate | Votes | % | ±% |
|---|---|---|---|---|
| Conservative | William Clark | 29,842 | 65.1 | +0.3 |
| Liberal | James Forrest | 12,402 | 27.1 | +6.2 |
| Labour | Robert C E Brooks | 3,568 | 7.8 | −5.5 |
| Majority | | 17,440 | 38.0 | −5.9 |
| Turnout | | 46,702 | 71.1 | −5.7 |
| Registered electors | | 64,482 | | |
| Conservative hold | | Swing | −2.9 | |

=== Elections in the 1970s ===
1979 notional result
| Party | Vote | % |
|---|---|---|
| Conservative | 31,559 | 64.9 |
| Liberal | 10,168 | 20.9 |
| Labour | 6,450 | 13.3 |
| Others | 476 | 1.0 |
| Turnout | 48,653 | |
| Electorate | | |

General election 1979: Croydon South
| Party | Candidate | Votes | % | ±% |
|---|---|---|---|---|
| Conservative | William Clark | 30,874 | 64.9 | +7.0 |
| Liberal | Peter Billenness | 10,006 | 21.0 | −4.9 |
| Labour | John Bloom | 6,249 | 13.1 | −3.1 |
| National Front | Roland Dummer | 469 | 1.0 | New |
| Majority | | 20,868 | 43.9 | +11.9 |
| Turnout | | 47,598 | 76.7 | +2.8 |
| Registered electors | | 62,022 | | |
| Conservative hold | | Swing | +5.9 | |

General election October 1974: Croydon South
| Party | Candidate | Votes | % | ±% |
|---|---|---|---|---|
| Conservative | William Clark | 25,703 | 57.9 | −1.2 |
| Liberal | D Nunneley | 11,514 | 25.9 | −0.8 |
| Labour | DW Keene | 7,203 | 16.2 | +2.0 |
| Majority | | 14,189 | 32.0 | −0.4 |
| Turnout | | 44,420 | 73.9 | −8.4 |
| Registered electors | | 60,090 | | |
| Conservative hold | | Swing | −0.2 | |

General election February 1974: Croydon South
| Party | Candidate | Votes | % | ±% |
|---|---|---|---|---|
| Conservative | William Clark | 28,915 | 59.1 | −5.5 |
| Liberal | Jean Coleman | 13,048 | 26.7 | +7.8 |
| Labour | Henry Hodge | 6,965 | 14.2 | −2.3 |
| Majority | | 15,867 | 32.4 | |
| Turnout | | 48,928 | 82.3 | +10.0 |
| Registered electors | | 59,447 | | |
| Conservative hold | | Swing | −6.7 | |

1970 notional result
| Party | Vote | % |
|---|---|---|
| Conservative | 28,500 | 64.6 |
| Liberal | 8,300 | 18.8 |
| Labour | 7,300 | 16.6 |
| Turnout | 44,100 | 72.4 |
| Electorate | 60,952 | |

== Election results 1955 to 1974 ==
=== Elections in the 1970s ===
General election 1970: Croydon South
| Party | Candidate | Votes | % | ±% |
|---|---|---|---|---|
| Conservative | Richard Thompson | 25,986 | 49.74 | +5.18 |
| Labour | David Winnick | 22,283 | 42.65 | −2.08 |
| Liberal | Michael R Lane | 3,673 | 7.03 | −3.68 |
| Independent | C Thornton | 303 | 0.58 | New |
| Majority | | 3,703 | 7.09 | N/A |
| Turnout | | 52,245 | 71.29 | −4.81 |
| Conservative gain from Labour | | Swing | +3.63 | |

=== Elections in 1960s ===
General election 1966: Croydon South
| Party | Candidate | Votes | % | ±% |
|---|---|---|---|---|
| Labour | David Winnick | 21,496 | 44.73 | −2.52 |
| Conservative | Richard Thompson | 21,415 | 44.56 | −8.19 |
| Liberal | W Edward P Babbs | 5,146 | 10.71 | New |
| Majority | | 81 | 0.17 | N/A |
| Turnout | | 48,057 | 76.10 | +1.83 |
| Labour gain from Conservative | | Swing | +2.84 | |

General election 1964: Croydon South
| Party | Candidate | Votes | % | ±% |
|---|---|---|---|---|
| Conservative | Richard Thompson | 24,854 | 52.75 | −5.41 |
| Labour | Tyrell Burgess | 22,265 | 47.25 | +5.41 |
| Majority | | 2,589 | 5.50 | −10.82 |
| Turnout | | 47,119 | 74.27 | −4.86 |
| Conservative hold | | Swing | −5.41 | |

=== Elections in 1950s ===
General election 1959: Croydon South
| Party | Candidate | Votes | % | ±% |
|---|---|---|---|---|
| Conservative | Richard Thompson | 29,284 | 58.16 | +1.18 |
| Labour | Frederic A Messer | 22,069 | 41.84 | −1.18 |
| Majority | | 8,215 | 16.32 | +2.36 |
| Turnout | | 51,353 | 79.13 | +1.90 |
| Conservative hold | | Swing | +1.18 | |

General election 1955: Croydon South
| Party | Candidate | Votes | % |
|---|---|---|---|
| Conservative | Richard Thompson | 27,359 | 56.98 |
| Labour | Arthur Carr | 20,659 | 43.02 |
| Majority | | 6,700 | 13.96 |
| Turnout | | 48,018 | 77.23 |
| Registered electors | | | |
| Conservative win (new seat) | | | |

== Election results 1918 to 1950 ==
=== Elections in 1940s ===
General election 1945: Croydon South
| Party | Candidate | Votes | % | ±% |
|---|---|---|---|---|
| Labour | David Rees-Williams | 27,650 | 53.4 | +24.4 |
| Conservative | Herbert Williams | 24,147 | 46.6 | −15.7 |
| Majority | | 3,503 | 6.8 | N/A |
| Turnout | | 51,797 | 70.1 | +4.9 |
| Labour gain from Conservative | | Swing | +20.1 | |

=== Elections in 1930s ===
General election 1935: Croydon South
| Party | Candidate | Votes | % | ±% |
|---|---|---|---|---|
| Conservative | Herbert Williams | 31,971 | 62.3 | −18.0 |
| Labour | T Crawford | 14,900 | 29.0 | +9.3 |
| Liberal | David William Alun Llewellyn | 4,440 | 8.7 | New |
| Majority | | 17,071 | 33.3 | −27.6 |
| Turnout | | 45,860 | 65.2 | −3.1 |
| Conservative hold | | Swing | | |

1932 Croydon South by-election
| Party | Candidate | Votes | % | ±% |
|---|---|---|---|---|
| Conservative | Herbert Williams | 19,126 | 67.5 | −12.8 |
| Labour | Rudolph Putnam Messel | 9,189 | 32.5 | +12.8 |
| Majority | | 9,937 | 35.0 | −25.7 |
| Turnout | | 28,315 | 38.2 | −30.1 |
| Conservative hold | | Swing | −12.8 | |

General election 1931: Croydon South
| Party | Candidate | Votes | % | ±% |
|---|---|---|---|---|
| Conservative | William Mitchell-Thomson | 40,672 | 80.34 | +31.14 |
| Labour | T. Crawford | 9,950 | 19.66 | −9.52 |
| Majority | | 30,722 | 60.69 | +40.67 |
| Turnout | | 50,622 | 68.33 | +0.91 |
| Conservative hold | | Swing | +20.33 | |

=== Elections in the 1920s ===
General election 1929: Croydon South
| Party | Candidate | Votes | % | ±% |
|---|---|---|---|---|
| Unionist | William Mitchell-Thomson | 23,258 | 49.2 | −15.4 |
| Labour | E.W. Wilton | 13,793 | 29.2 | −6.2 |
| Liberal | Albert Sigismund Elwell-Sutton | 10,218 | 21.6 | New |
| Majority | | 9,465 | 20.0 | −9.2 |
| Turnout | | 47,269 | 67.4 | −4.6 |
| Registered electors | | 70,107 | | |
| Unionist hold | | Swing | −4.6 | |

General election 1924: Croydon South
| Party | Candidate | Votes | % | ±% |
|---|---|---|---|---|
| Unionist | William Mitchell-Thomson | 23,734 | 64.6 | +19.1 |
| Labour | H.T. Muggeridge | 12,979 | 35.4 | +3.8 |
| Majority | | 10,755 | 29.2 | +15.3 |
| Turnout | | 36,713 | 72.0 | +8.6 |
| Registered electors | | 50,964 | | |
| Unionist hold | | Swing | +7.7 | |

General election 1923: Croydon South
| Party | Candidate | Votes | % | ±% |
|---|---|---|---|---|
| Unionist | William Mitchell-Thomson | 14,310 | 45.5 | −1.8 |
| Labour | H.T. Muggeridge | 9,926 | 31.6 | +4.1 |
| Liberal | Wynne Cemlyn-Jones | 7,208 | 22.9 | −2.3 |
| Majority | | 4,384 | 13.9 | −5.9 |
| Turnout | | 31,444 | 63.4 | −3.0 |
| Registered electors | | 49,634 | | |
| Unionist hold | | Swing | −3.0 | |

General election 1922: Croydon South
| Party | Candidate | Votes | % | ±% |
|---|---|---|---|---|
| Unionist | Allan Smith | 15,356 | 47.3 | −24.5 |
| Labour | H.T. Muggeridge | 8,942 | 27.5 | −0.7 |
| Liberal | Thomas Dobson | 8,183 | 25.2 | N/A |
| Majority | | 6,414 | 19.8 | −23.8 |
| Turnout | | 32,481 | 66.4 | +11.4 |
| Registered electors | | 48,904 | | |
| Unionist hold | | Swing | −11.9 | |

=== Elections in the 1910s ===
1919 Croydon South by-election
| Party | | Candidate | Votes | % | ±% |
|---|---|---|---|---|---|
| C | Unionist | Allan Smith | 11,777 | 55.2 | −16.6 |
| | Liberal | Howard Houlder | 9,573 | 44.8 | New |
| Majority | | | 2,204 | 10.4 | −33.2 |
| Turnout | | | 21,350 | 45.5 | −9.5 |
| Registered electors | | | 46,900 | | |
| | Unionist hold | | Swing | N/A | |
C indicates candidate endorsed by the coalition government.

General election 1918: Croydon South
| Party | | Candidate | Votes | % |
|---|---|---|---|---|
| C | Unionist | Ian Malcolm | 17,813 | 71.8 |
| | Labour | H.T. Muggeridge | 7,006 | 28.2 |
| Majority | | | 10,807 | 43.6 |
| Turnout | | | 24,819 | 55.0 |
| Registered electors | | | 45,115 | |
| | Unionist win (new seat) | | | |
C indicates candidate endorsed by the coalition government.

== See also ==
- List of parliamentary constituencies in London

== Sources ==
- Leigh Rayment's Historical List of MPs – Constituencies beginning with "C" (part 6)
