= Arthur Davidson (politician) =

British politician (1926–2018)

Arthur Davidson QC

Shadow Attorney General
- In office 24 November 1982 – 10 June 1983
- Leader: Michael Foot
- Preceded by: Peter Archer
- Succeeded by: John Morris

Member of Parliament for Accrington
- In office 31 March 1966 – 13 May 1983
- Preceded by: Harry Hynd
- Succeeded by: Constituency abolished

Personal details
- Born: 7 November 1926 Liverpool, England
- Died: 16 January 2018 (aged 91)
- Party: Labour
- Education: Trinity College, Cambridge

Arthur Davidson, QC (7 November 1926 – 16 January 2018) was a British Labour Party politician.

== Early life ==
Davidson was born in Liverpool to Abraham Davidson, a carpet manufacturer who had left Russia as a child, and his wife Rose (née Speiler). He was educated at Liverpool College, King George V School, Southport, and Trinity College, Cambridge, where he was a member of the university athletics team and captained the college team. He served with the Merchant Navy and became a barrister, called to the bar by Middle Temple in 1953, and appointed a QC in 1978.

== Political career ==
Davidson contested Blackpool South in 1955 and Preston North in 1959. He was member of parliament for Accrington from 1966 to 1983, when the seat was abolished by boundary changes. He stood in the new seat of Hyndburn, but lost by just 21 votes to the Conservative Ken Hargreaves.

He was a minister in the Attorney General's Department between 1974 and 1979, under Harold Wilson and James Callaghan. From November 1982 to June 1983, he was Shadow Attorney General.

== Outside parliament ==
He was an expert in sports and media law, and acted for sportsmen including Robbie Fowler, Frank Bruno, Jimmy Hill and Kenny Dalglish. He was legal director of Associated Newspapers from 1985 to 1991 and Legal Director of Mirror Group Newspapers from 1991 to 1993, and worked at Express Newspapers. His final job was as the lawyer for the magazine Time Out in London.

He enjoyed jazz, and was a passionate supporter of Liverpool Football Club. Davidson died in January 2018, at the age of 91 (although many press reports erroneously stated he was 89, due to the fact that he had, as his Guardian obituary noted, taken "two years off his age when he was 40, just after reaching Westminster").

== Notes ==
Parliament of the United Kingdom
Preceded by Harry Hynd	Member of Parliament for Accrington; 1966–1983	Constituency abolished
