= Richard Raphael =

English cricketer

Personal information
- Full name: Richard Henry Raphael
- Born: 29 August 1872; Steyning, Sussex, England
- Died: 3 January 1910 (aged 37); Westminster, London, England
- Batting: Right-handed
- Bowling: Unknown
- Relatives: John Raphael (cousin)

Career statistics
Competition	First-class
Matches	4
Runs scored	246
Batting average	35.14
100s/50s	1/–
Top score	111
Balls bowled	12
Wickets	0
Bowling average	–
5 wickets in innings	–
10 wickets in match	–
Best bowling	–
Catches/stumpings	–/–
- Source: Cricinfo, 26 July 2019

Richard Henry Raphael (29 August 1872 – 23 January 1910) was an English first-class cricketer.

Raphael was born at Steyning in August 1872. He was educated at Wellington College, before going up to Magdalen College, Oxford. After graduating from Oxford, he entered the family merchant bank. He toured British India with the Oxford University Authentics in 1902–03, making three first-class appearances on the tour against Bombay, the Parsees and the Gentlemen of India. He scored 642 runs on the tour, 202 of which came in first-class matches. His highest first-class score on the tour of 111 came against the Parsees. He played a single first-class match in 1904 for G. J. V. Weigall's XI against Cambridge University at Fenner's. He was elected as a manager at the London Stock Exchange in January 1910, one of the youngest people elected to the position. He died suddenly a week later at Westminster. His cousin, John Raphael, also played first-class cricket.
