= Coulsdon East (ward) =

Ward in the London Borough of Croydon, England

Coordinates: 51.306°N 0.124°W

- Former ward for Croydon Council
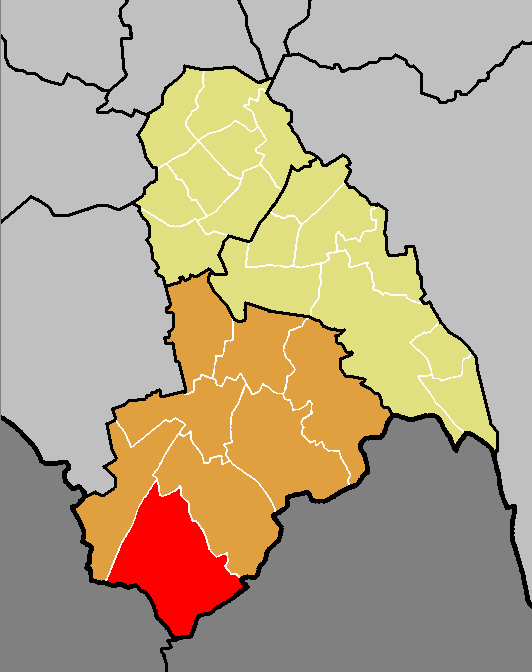
- Boundary of Coulsdon East in Croydon South within the London Borough of Croydon from 2002 to 2018.
- County: Greater London

1965–2018
- Number of councillors: Three
- Replaced by: Old Coulsdon
- UK Parliament constituency: Croydon South

Coulsdon East was a ward in the London Borough of Croydon, covering part of the Coulsdon area of London in the United Kingdom. The ward formed part of Chris Philp MP's Croydon South constituency. At the 2011 Census the population of the Ward was 12,244.

The ward returned three councillors every four years to Croydon Council. At the 2006 Croydon Council election, Terry Lenton, Brian Udell and Chris Wright were elected to the council. All stood as Conservative Party candidates. In Coulsdon East in 2006, the Labour Party did not field any candidates. The local election marked the highest turnout (57.2%) in the London Borough elections in 2006.

At the 2010 local elections the ward was retained by the Conservatives. The 2010 election coincided with the General election which had the effect of improving turnout amongst voters. Turnout climbed to 73.5%.

The successful Conservative candidates were Justin Cromie, Terry Lenton and Chris Wright. The Conservative share of the vote fell from 63.2% to 48.6% with the Liberal Democrats' share of the vote falling to 26.9%. The Labour party polled 9.9%, their lowest share in Borough of Croydon wards in the 2010 election.

== List of Councillors ==
Election	Councillor	Party	Councillor	Party	Councillor	Party
1964	Ward created					
1964	Miss J.C. Simpson	Residents	A. Bonsier	Residents	L. Blair	Residents
1968	Miss J.C. Simpson	Residents	A. Bonsier	Residents	H.C.E. Lovejoy	Liberal
1971	Mrs Pamela A.M. Little	Conservative	A. Bonsier	Conservative	A.B. Horton	Conservative
1974	Mrs Pamela A.M. Little	Conservative	Mrs K.A. Littlechild	Conservative	P.D. Cove	Conservative
1976 By-election	Mrs Pamela A.M. Little	Conservative	Mrs K.A. Littlechild	Conservative	Martin A. Levie	Conservative
1978	Mrs Pamela A.M. Little	Conservative	Stanley E. Littlechild	Conservative	Martin A. Levie	Conservative
1986	Michael S. Barber	Conservative	Stanley E. Littlechild	Conservative	Andrew J. Pelling	Conservative
1987 By-election	Susan T. Taylor	Conservative	Stanley E. Littlechild	Conservative	Andrew J. Pelling	Conservative
1990	Susan T. Taylor	Conservative	Christopher Wright	Conservative	Andrew J. Pelling	Conservative
1992 By-election	Christine A. Prentice	Conservative	Christopher Wright	Conservative	Andrew J. Pelling	Conservative
1994	Christine A. Prentice	Conservative	Christopher Wright	Conservative	Jason S. Perry	Conservative
1998	Ian R. Atkins	Liberal Democrat	Christopher Wright	Conservative	Jason S. Perry	Conservative
2002	Ian R. Atkins	Liberal Democrat	Christopher Wright	Conservative	Brian A. Udell	Conservative
2006	Theresa R. Lenton	Conservative	Christopher Wright	Conservative	Brian A. Udell	Conservative
2010	Theresa R. Lenton	Conservative	Christopher Wright	Conservative	Justin W. Cromie	Conservative
2014	Margaret Bird	Conservative	Christopher Wright	Conservative	James Thompson	Conservative
2018	Ward abolished					

== Ward Result ==
Coulsdon East (2014)
Party	Candidate	Votes	%	±%
Conservative	Christopher Wright	2,294	19.6	+1.4
Conservative	Margaret Bird	2,230	19.0	+1.7
Conservative	James Thompson	1,864	15.9	−1.0
UKIP	Alan Smith	968	8.3	+5.0
Liberal Democrats	Gill Hickson	696	5.9	−5.0
Liberal Democrats	Arfan Bhatti	649	5.5	−3.8
Liberal Democrats	Ashley Burridge	574	4.9	−3.8
Labour	Lee Findell	527	4.5	+0.6
Labour	Helen Lovesey	475	4.0	+0.5
Labour	Joanne Milligan	430	3.7	+0.4
Green	Ernest Bullimore	356	3.0	+1.2
Green	Helena Farndon	355	3.0	+2.1
Green	Jennifer Ginn	314	2.7	+1.4
Total votes		11,732		
Conservative hold		Swing		
Conservative hold		Swing		
Conservative hold		Swing		
