= Robert Hermon-Hodge, 1st Baron Wyfold =

British politician

Hermon-Hodge

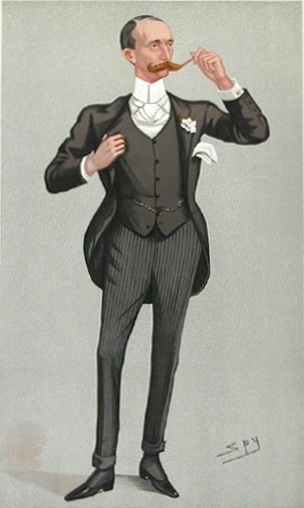
"Accrington" Hermon-Hodge as caricatured by Spy (Leslie Ward) in Vanity Fair, June 1892

Robert Trotter Hermon-Hodge, 1st Baron Wyfold, DL (23 September 1851 – 3 June 1937) was a British Conservative politician.

Born Robert Trotter Hodge, he was the son of G W Hodge of Newcastle upon Tyne. He was educated at Clifton College and Worcester College, Oxford. In 1877 he married Frances Caroline Hermon, only daughter of Edward Hermon, Member of Parliament (MP) for Preston. In 1903 he added her surname to his own to become "Hermon-Hodge".

== Parliamentary career ==
He entered politics in 1884, when he was adopted as Conservative candidate for the Wallingford seat. When the seat was abolished by the Redistribution of Seats Act 1885, he contested the newly created Accrington seat in Lancashire, and won it in the 1886 general election, marking his first return to the Commons. He served one term losing the seat at the next election in 1892, and narrowly failing to be re-elected in an 1893 by-election.

Hodge gained his longest spell in the Commons from the 1895 general election as MP for the Southern or Henley Division of Oxfordshire. He held the seat in 1900 and was defeated in the Liberal landslide of 1906. His 10 1/2 years for this seat proved longer than the 9 1/4 total years he served in three separate chunks at other times. He was announced as a recipient of a baronetcy in the 1902 Coronation Honours list, published on 26 June 1902, for the coronation of King Edward VII, though the ceremony was later postponed. On 24 July 1902 he was created a Baronet, of Wyfold Court in the Parish of Checkendon in the county of Oxford.

He returned to the Commons for a third time when he won a by-election in March 1909 at Croydon. Re-elected at the ensuing poll in January 1910, he stood down for the election in December of the same year.

In May 1917, Valentine Fleming, the sitting MP for Henley, was killed fighting on the Western Front. An election was announced and Hermon-Hodge was returned unopposed for his old seat at the by-election in June. He retired from parliament at the post-war general election in 1918. In May 1919 he was raised to the peerage as Baron Wyfold, of Accrington in the County Palatine of Lancaster and participated in the Lords 34 times, all before 1931. His son did so 13 times all in the 1937-1938 period.

== Life outside parliament ==
He enjoyed the life of a country gentleman at the family estate of Wyfold Court, near Reading, Berkshire. He was an enthusiastic sportsman, being a member of various hunts in Berkshire and South Oxfordshire. He also participated in deer-stalking, shooting and fishing. He attended the Henley Regatta each year, and is remembered in the name of the Wyfold Challenge Cup. He was also a leading freemason and was for thirty years a member of the Queen's Own Oxfordshire Hussars.

He was in command of the Oxfordshire Yeomanry during the Second Boer War. He was placed under orders to proceed to South Africa, but was forbidden by his medical advisers to undertake any active service. He remained honorary colonel of the regiment at the time of his death.

He had seven sons-two of whom died in the First World War-and one daughter. His wife died in 1929, and Lord Wyfold died in June 1937, aged 85.

== Arms ==
Coat of arms of Robert Hermon-Hodge, 1st Baron Wyfold
Crest An Eagle wings addorsed and inverted Or supporting with the dexter claw an Increscent Argent and looking at the Rays of the Sun issuant from Clouds proper Escutcheon Sable a Lion couchant Erminois holding between the paws a Bale of Cotton proper Supporters On either side a Trooper of the Oxfordshire Yeomanry (Queen's Own Oxford Hussars) Motto Praemium Virtutis Gloria (Glory is the reward of valour)

Parliament of the United Kingdom
Preceded by Frederick Grafton	Member of Parliament for Accrington; 1886–1892	Succeeded by Joseph Leese
Preceded by Francis Parker	Member of Parliament for Henley; 1895–1906	Succeeded by Philip Morrell
Preceded by H. O. Arnold-Forster	Member of Parliament for Croydon; 1909–1910	Succeeded by Ian Zachary Malcolm
Preceded by Valentine Fleming	Member of Parliament for Henley; 1917–1918	Succeeded by Reginald Terrell
Baronetage of the United Kingdom
New creation	Baronet (of Wyfold Court); 1902–1937	Succeeded by Roland Hermon-Hodge
Peerage of the United Kingdom
New creation	Baron Wyfold; 1919–1937	Succeeded by Roland Hermon-Hodge
