= Harry Hynd =

Henry Hynd (4 July 1900 – 1 February 1985), known as Harry Hynd, was a British Labour Party politician.

He was first elected as a Member of Parliament for Hackney Central at the 1945 General Election. He moved seats at the 1950 General Election and represented Accrington until he retired from the House of Commons at the 1966 General Election. He died in Hendon aged 84.

Parliament of the United Kingdom
Preceded by Frederick Charles Watkins	Member of Parliament for Hackney Central; 1945–1950	Constituency abolished
Preceded by Walter Scott-Elliot	Member of Parliament for Accrington; 1950–1966	Succeeded by Arthur Davidson
Trade union offices
Preceded by John Stokes	Treasurer of the London Trades Council; 1942–1945	Succeeded by Henry Levitt
