= 1893 Accrington by-election =

UK parliamentary by-election

The 1893 Accrington by-election was held on 21 December 1893 after the incumbent Liberal MP Joseph Leese becoming the Recorder of Manchester and so having to stand for re-election as a paid government office. Leese retained the seat.

The Conservative candidate, Robert Trotter Hodge had been the MP for Accrington from 1886 to 1892.

Accrington by-election, 1893
Party	Candidate	Votes	%	±%
Liberal	Joseph Leese	5,822	51.1	
Conservative	Robert Trotter Hodge	5,564	48.9	
Majority		258	2.2	
Turnout		11,386	92.1	
Liberal hold		Swing		
