= Tom Snowden =

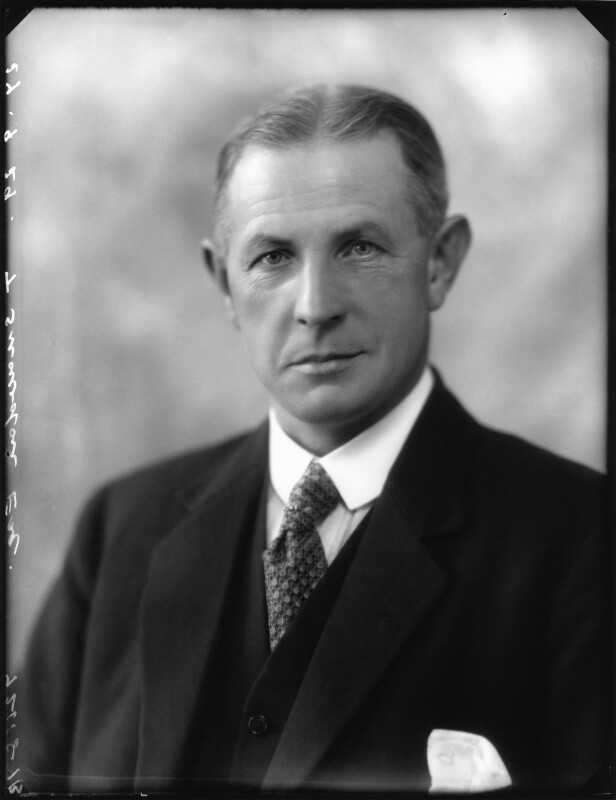
Snowden

Tom Snowden CBE, (1875-27 November 1949) was a British Labour Party politician.

Born in Cowling in the West Riding of Yorkshire, he was educated at the local board school before establishing his own worsted cloth manufacturing business in Keighley. He first contested a parliamentary election in 1918 as a Labour candidate for Shipley. He was not elected, but became a member of Bingley Urban District Council, of which he was chairman in 1921–22.

He made three more unsuccessful attempts to enter the Commons for Yorkshire constituencies: for Skipton in 1922 and Sheffield Central in 1923 and 1924.

He served three terms on the West Riding County Council as councillor for Bingley, from 1913 to 1916, 1919–22, and 1925–28. He was a governor of Giggleswick School.

At the 1929 general election he was chosen to contest the Lancashire seat of Accrington. The Labour Party made large gains throughout the country, and Snowden was elected as Accrington's member of parliament. Labour formed a minority government. However this government collapsed in 1931 and the Labour Party split. At the ensuing general election in October 1931, Labour lost most of the seats it had won in 1929, including Snowden's.

He did not contest another parliamentary election, but became a member of Keighley Borough Council, and was Mayor of Keighley in 1942–43. He was a justice of the peace and chairman of the Bingley Bench of Magistrates.

He was a cousin of Philip Snowden, 1st Viscount Snowden, a Labour cabinet minister, who also came from Cowling. Following the viscount's death in 1937, Tom Snowden scattered his ashes on Ickornshaw Moor close to his birthplace.

He was made a Commander of the Most Excellent Order of the British Empire (CBE) in the Birthday Honours of 1949 for "political and public services in the West Riding of Yorkshire". He died later in the same year at his home in Bingley, aged 74.

Parliament of the United Kingdom
Preceded by Hugh Edwards	Member of Parliament for Accrington; 1929–1931	Succeeded by Henry Adam Procter
