= Walter Scott-Elliot =

British politician (1895–1977)

Member of Parliament for Accrington
- In office 5 July 1945 – 3 February 1950
- Preceded by: Henry Procter
- Succeeded by: Harry Hynd

Personal details
- Born: 9 October 1895 Kensington, London
- Died: 14 December 1977 (aged 82) Guisachen, Scotland
- Party: Labour
- Spouses: Maria von Groeller (m. 1939; ann. 1948) Dorothy Alice Nunn (m. 1948; died 1977)
- Occupation: Politician

Captain Walter Travers Scott-Elliot (9 October 1895 – 14 December 1977) was a British company director and politician who served one term as a Member of Parliament. He is remembered for the cause of his death: he and his wife were both murdered by Scottish serial killer Archibald Hall, whom they had hired as a butler.

== Family ==
Scott-Elliot was from an aristocratic Scottish family based in Arkleton near Langholm, Dumfriesshire, and was educated at Eton. He fought in the Coldstream Guards during the First World War, until 1919. On leaving, he joined the Bombay Company Ltd, which traded goods, mainly cotton, between Britain and India. From 1927 he was managing director. When he succeeded his father as Laird of Arkleton, he also took over the hill-farming on the estate. In the Second World War he served as a specialist civil servant at the Ministry of Labour.

== Election to Parliament ==
At the 1945 general election, Scott-Elliot was elected as Labour Party Member of Parliament for Accrington. His background made him an unlikely recruit for the Labour Party, although he was sincere in his belief that socialist planning was best for business. His connection with the cotton trade helped him make friends among the weavers in the constituency.

== Offices held ==
Scott-Elliot served as Parliamentary Private Secretary to the Financial Secretaries to the War Office, successively Frederick Bellenger and John Freeman, from 1946 to 1947. A frequent contributor to House of Commons debates, he was a member of the executive committee of the National Trust.

== Standing down from Parliament ==
Scott-Elliot disagreed with the government's policy of nationalising the steel industry, although not to nationalisation in general, and he did not vote against the whip. In October 1948 he wrote a letter to The Times which accepted the call by dissident Labour MP Ivor Thomas for a political truce and a government of national unity. When Thomas left the Labour Party over opposition to steel nationalisation, the Accrington Trades and Labour Party repudiated the letter, and Scott-Elliot announced that he would not fight the next election.

== Post-Parliamentary career ==
Going back to his estate and business, Scott-Elliot retired in the late 1960s and spent most of his time collecting antiques. His first marriage to Maria von Groeller had been annulled in 1948 and he had remarried that year to Dorothy Nunn, who was much younger than he. He had a London flat at Richmond Court on Sloane Street. In 1977, Scott-Elliot engaged a new butler called Archibald Hall. Unknown to Scott-Elliot, Hall was a thief and a murderer.

== Murder ==
When Dorothy Scott-Elliot interrupted Hall and his accomplice discussing their burglary plans, they suffocated her. When her husband arrived back, he was drugged and the two were driven to the Scottish highlands. Mrs Scott-Elliot was buried in Perthshire, while Walter Scott-Elliot was driven to Guisachen, near Inverness, where he was throttled with a scarf, beaten over the head with a spade, and then buried in the forest.

Scott-Elliot's status as a former Member of Parliament added some interest to the case of Archibald Hall. Hall was nicknamed "the Monster Butler" by some newspapers. As Scott-Elliot had been murdered in Scotland while Hall's other four murders were committed in England, Hall and accomplice Michael Kitto had to be tried separately in Edinburgh for the murder of Scott-Elliot in May 1978. They were convicted and Hall was given a 15-year tariff which he had to serve before being considered for release. At his subsequent triple-murder trial in London, he was convicted and given a whole life tariff.

Parliament of the United Kingdom
Preceded by Henry Procter	Member of Parliament for Accrington; 1945–1950	Succeeded by Harry Hynd
