= Old Coulsdon (ward) =

Coordinates: 51.306°N 0.124°W

- ward for Croydon Council
- Boundary of Old Coulsdon in Croydon from 2018.
- County: Greater London

Current ward
- Created: 2018
- Councillor: Margaret Bird (Conservative)
- Councillor: Gill Hickson (Liberal Democrats)
- Number of councillors: Two
- Created from: Coulsdon East
- UK Parliament constituency: Croydon South

Old Coulsdon is a ward in the London Borough of Croydon, covering part of the Coulsdon area of London in the United Kingdom. The ward currently forms part of Chris Philp MP's Croydon South constituency. At the 2011 Census the population of the former Coulsdon East Ward was 12,244.

The ward returns two councillors every four years to Croydon Council.

The ward was formed from part of the former Coulsdon East ward, following a boundary review in Croydon, ahead of the 2018 election.

== Summary ==
Map of present boundaries

Councillors elected by party at each Croydon Council election.

- Conservative
- Lib Dem

== List of Councillors ==
Election	Councillor	Party	Councillor	Party
2018	Ward created			
2018	Margaret Bird	Conservative	Steve Hollands	Conservative
2022	Margaret Bird	Conservative	Nikhil Sherine Thampi	Conservative
2026	Margaret Bird	Conservative	Gill Hickson	Liberal Democrats

== Mayoral elections ==
Below are the results for the candidate which received the highest share of the popular vote in the ward at each mayoral election.

Year	Mayoralty	Mayoral candidate	Party	Winner?
2021	Mayor of London	Shaun Bailey	Conservative	✗
2022	Mayor of Croydon	Jason Perry	Conservative	✓
2026	Mayor of Croydon	Jason Perry	Conservative	✓

== Ward results ==
Croydon Council Election 2022: Old Coulsdon (2)
Party	Candidate	Votes	%	±%
Conservative	Margaret Bird*	1,999		
Conservative	Nikhil Sherine Thampi	1,555		
Liberal Democrats	Gill Hickson	1,376		
Liberal Democrats	John Jefkins	932		
Green	Mick Kilkelly	209		
Labour	Jason O'Dwyer	208		
Labour	Mary Wolf	194		
Turnout		3,479	45.79	
Conservative hold		Swing		
Conservative hold		Swing		

Croydon Council Election 2018: Old Coulsdon (2)
Party	Candidate	Votes	%	±%
Conservative	Margaret Bird	2,099	31.95	
Conservative	Steven Leslie Victor Hollands	1,779	27.08	
Liberal Democrats	Gill Hickson	838	12.75	
Liberal Democrats	Richard Michael Howard	572	8.71	
Labour	Alan Donovan	485	7.38	
Labour	Ann Creighton	431	6.56	
UKIP	Hoong-Wai Cheah	129	1.96	
Green	Alison Gillett	129	1.96	
Green	Jonathan Mark Moles	108	1.64	
Majority		941	14.32	
Turnout				
Conservative hold		Swing		
Conservative hold		Swing		
