= 1912 Nottingham East by-election =

UK parliamentary by-election

The Nottingham East by-election was a Parliamentary by-election held on 19 April 1912. It returned one Member of Parliament (MP) to the House of Commons of the Parliament of the United Kingdom, elected through the first past the post voting system.

== Electoral history ==
General election December 1910: Nottingham East
Party	Candidate	Votes	%	±%
Conservative	James Morrison	6,274	56.6	
Liberal	Dudley Stewart-Smith	4,804	43.4	
Majority		1,470	13.2	
Turnout		11,078		
Conservative hold		Swing		

== Candidates ==
Dobson

Rees

== Result ==
John David Rees held the seat for the Conservative Party.

Nottingham East by-election, 1912
Party	Candidate	Votes	%	±%
Conservative	John David Rees	6,482	55.7	−0.9
Liberal	Thomas Dobson	5,158	44.3	+0.9
Majority		1,324	11.4	−1.8
Turnout		11,640		
Conservative hold		Swing		

== Aftermath ==
A General Election was due to take place by the end of 1915. By the autumn of 1914, the following candidates had been adopted to contest that election. Due to the outbreak of war, the election never took place.

General Election 1914/15: Nottingham East
Party	Candidate	Votes	%	±%
Unionist	John David Rees			
Labour	Tom Proctor			

General election 14 December 1918: Nottingham East
Party	Candidate	Votes	%	±%
Unionist	John David Rees	9,549	71.0	
Labour	Tom Proctor	2,817	20.9	New
Independent	Joseph N Dennis Brookes	1,083	9.1	New
Majority		6,732	50.1	
Turnout		13,449		
Unionist hold		Swing		

- Rees was the endorsed candidate of the Coalition Government.
