= John Raphael (sportsman) =

English cricketer and rugby union player

- Raphael in 1909

Personal information
- Full name: John Edward Raphael
- Born: 30 April 1882; Brussels, Belgium
- Died: 11 June 1917 (aged 35); Rémy, France
- Batting: Right-handed
- Bowling: Right-arm slow-medium
- Role: Batsman
- Relatives: Richard Raphael (cousin)

Domestic team information
- Years: Team
- 1901–1902: London County
- 1903–1909: Surrey
- 1903–1905: Oxford University
- 1905–1913: MCC

Career statistics
| Competition | First-class |
|---|---|
| Matches | 77 |
| Runs scored | 3,717 |
| Batting average | 30.97 |
| 100s/50s | 5/17 |
| Top score | 201 |
| Balls bowled | 690 |
| Wickets | 3 |
| Bowling average | 137.00 |
| 5 wickets in innings | 0 |
| 10 wickets in match | 0 |
| Best bowling | 1/34 |
| Catches/stumpings | 36/– |
- Source: CricketArchive, 8 October 2022

John Edward Raphael (30 April 1882 – 11 June 1917) was a Belgian-born sportsman who was capped nine times for England at rugby union and played first-class cricket with Surrey. He was a Barrister by profession and a Liberal politician.

== Background ==
Raphael was Jewish, and the son of multi-millionaire financier Albert Raphael, who was part of a banking dynasty that in the 1920s rivalled the Rothschild family, John Raphael was educated at Merchant Taylors' School, and St John's College, Oxford. In January 2021, one of the eight pastoral Houses at Merchant Taylors' was renamed in his honour.

== Rugby ==
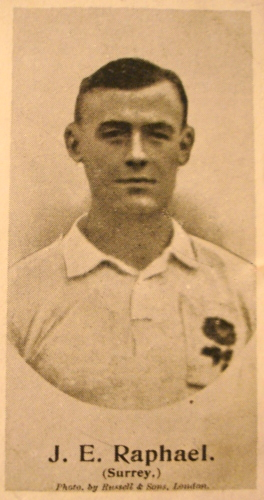
in England rugby jersey

Raphael won his first cap in 1902 when England took on Wales in the Home Nations Championship. A centre, winger or full-back, he also played in the 1905 and 1906 Championships as well as in Test matches against both France and New Zealand. The only points of his career came through a try which he scored in 1906 when playing Scotland. He captained the 1910 British Lions tour to Argentina, which included the South American nation's inaugural Test match.

Raphael authored a book Modern Rugby Football which was published posthumously by his mother in 1918

== Cricket ==
Raphael played his cricket as a specialist batsman and most of his appearances at first-class level were for either Surrey or Oxford University. He also played first-class matches for the Marylebone Cricket Club, Gentlemen of England, London County and an England XI amongst others. Four of Raphael's five centuries were scored for Oxford University, including his career best score of 201 which he made against Yorkshire, who had the bowling of Wilfred Rhodes at their disposal. It remains the only double hundred to be made by an Oxford cricketer against Yorkshire. His only century for Surrey came in the 1904 County Championship, which he captained his county for much of, scoring 111 against Worcestershire. A part-time bowler, his three first-class wickets were of Samuel Coe, Lord Dalmeny and Test cricketer John King.

== Politics ==
Raphael was involved in politics as a supporter of the Liberal Party. He stood for the UK parliament as Liberal candidate for Croydon at the 1909 Croydon by-election. In a three-way contest he finished second.

== Military ==
In World War I Raphael served with the King's Royal Rifle Corps as a Lieutenant and died of wounds in 1917 at the Battle of Messines, while fighting in the country of his birth.

He is buried at Lijssenthoek Military Cemetery near Poperinge, West Flanders, Belgium. Mrs Harriette Raphael, his mother, had her ashes buried next to his grave in 1929. A memorial to Raphael was erected by his mother at St Jude's Church, Hampstead Garden Suburb , to whom she bequeathed the family home on her death.

== See also ==
- List of international rugby union players killed in action during the First World War
- List of select Jewish cricketers
- List of select Jewish rugby union players
