= 1909 Croydon by-election =

UK Parliamentary by-election

← 1906	29 March 1909	Jan. 1910 →

Candidate	Hermon-Hodge	Raphael	Smith
Party	Conservative	Liberal	Labour
Popular vote	11,989	8,041	886
Percentage	57.4%	38.4%	4.2%
MP before election
H. O. Arnold-Forster
Liberal Unionist
Subsequent MP
Robert Hermon-Hodge
Conservative

The 1909 Croydon by-election was held on 29 March 1909. The by-election was held due to the death of the incumbent Liberal Unionist MP, H. O. Arnold-Forster. It was won by the Conservative candidate Robert Hermon-Hodge.

Croydon by-election, 1909
Party	Candidate	Votes	%	±%
Conservative	Robert Hermon-Hodge	11,989	57.4	+15.9
Liberal	John Raphael	8,041	38.4	+0.1
Labour	Frank Smith	886	4.2	−16.0
Majority		3,948	19.0	+15.8
Turnout		20,896	79.0	−4.0
Conservative hold		Swing	+7.9	
