= Coulsdon Town =

Coulsdon Town may refer to:

- Coulsdon, a suburb of London, United Kingdom
- Coulsdon Town (ward), an electoral ward for the Croydon Council
- Coulsdon Town railway station, serving the above
- Coulsdon Town F.C., a football club in Coulsdon
