= Henry Procter (politician) =

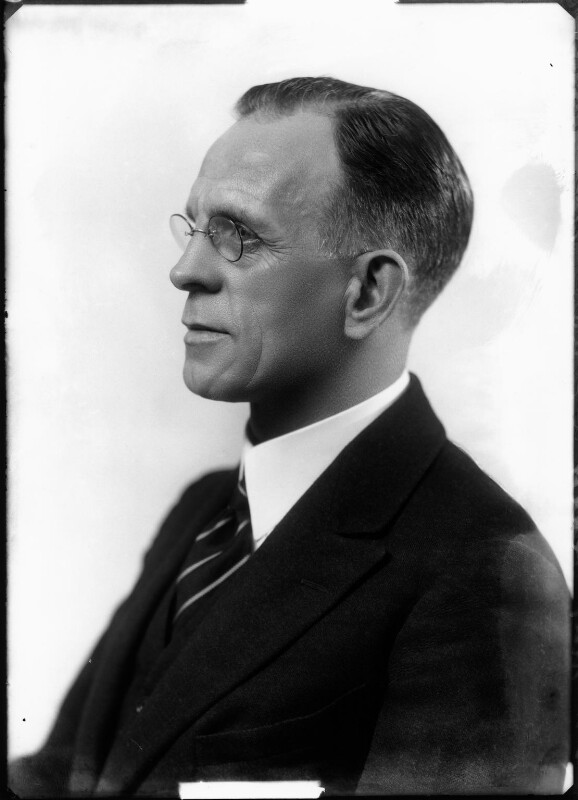
Procter

Henry Adam Procter (1883 – 26 March 1955) was a British Conservative Party politician.

Born in West Derby, Liverpool, he was educated at Bethany College, in the United States, the University of Melbourne and the University of Edinburgh. During the First World War he served in the army from 1916 onwards. In 1920 he was commissioned into the Army Educational Corps as a captain; he retired in 1922 with the rank of major. He was called to the bar at the Middle Temple in 1931

Procter was elected the member of parliament (MP) for the Accrington constituency in the 1931 general election, and was re-elected in 1935. He was defeated at the 1945 general election.

He married Amy Bedford, and had three daughters. He died in Paddington aged 71.

== Notes ==
Parliament of the United Kingdom
Preceded by Tom Snowden	Member of Parliament for Accrington; 1931 – 1945	Succeeded by Walter Scott-Elliot
