= Coulsdon West (ward) =

Ward in the London Borough of Croydon, England

Coordinates: 51.323°N 0.137°W

- Former ward for Croydon Council
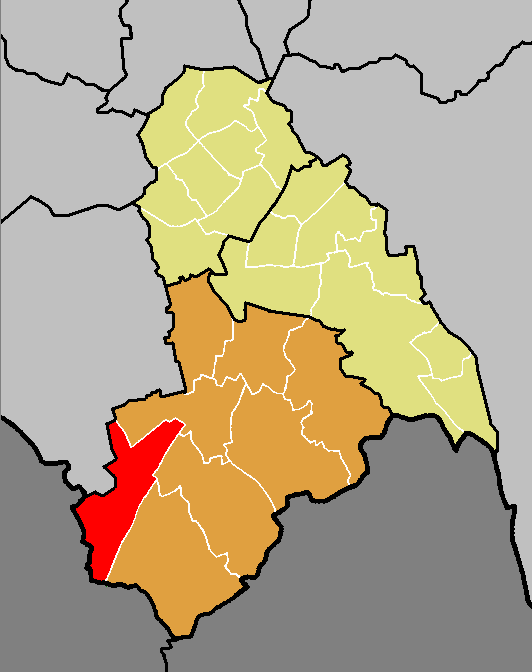
- Boundary of Coulsdon West in Croydon South within the London Borough of Croydon from 2002 to 2018.
- County: Greater London

1964–2018
- Number of councillors: Three
- Replaced by: Coulsdon Town
- Created from: Woodcote and Coulsdon West
- UK Parliament constituency: Croydon South

Coulsdon West was a ward in the London Borough of Croydon, covering part of the Coulsdon area of London in the United Kingdom. The ward formed part of Croydon South constituency, which has one of the highest majority's for the Conservative Party in London. At the 2011 Census the population of the ward was 13,449.

The ward returned three councillors every four years to Croydon Council. At the 2006 Croydon Council election, all three Conservative Party candidates were elected. The Labour Party's highest ranking candidate got 481 votes, one of the lowest for them in London.

== Ward result ==
Croydon Council Election 2006: Coulsdon West (3)
Party	Candidate	Votes	%	±%
Conservative	David Osland	2,706		
Conservative	Gavin Barwell	2,685		
Conservative	Brian Cakebread	2,640		
Liberal Democrats	Avril Bristow	775		
Liberal Democrats	Jean Callen	745		
Liberal Democrats	Brian Glaister	627		
Labour	Sarah Ward	481		
Labour	Richard Ackland	475		
Labour	Lee Findell	435		
Green	Andrew Lindsay	429		
The People's Choice	Sheila Lockwood	168		
Turnout		4,226	42.8%	
