= Allan Smith (solicitor) =

Sir Allan Macgregor Smith KBE (19 May 1871 – 21 February 1941) was a British solicitor, businessman, and Conservative Party politician. He was the MP for Croydon South 1919–1923.

Smith was born in Glasgow, the second of eight children. Educated at Glasgow University, he qualified as a solicitor, and during the First World War, successfully negotiated labour with trade unions to successfully meet munitions supply.

He was made a Knight Commander of the Order of the British Empire in the 1918 Birthday Honours.

Parliament of the United Kingdom
Preceded by Ian Malcolm	Member of Parliament for Croydon South; 1919–1923	Succeeded by William Mitchell-Thomson
