= Arkleton =

Coordinates: 55.213°N 02.977°W

- Location within Dumfries and Galloway
- OS grid reference: NY3791
- Council area: Dumfries and Galloway
- Lieutenancy area: Dumfries
- Country: Scotland
- Sovereign state: United Kingdom
- Post town: LANGHOLM
- Postcode district: DG13
- Dialling code: 013873
- Police: Scotland
- Fire: Scottish
- Ambulance: Scottish
- UK Parliament: Dumfriesshire, Clydesdale and Tweeddale
- Scottish Parliament: Dumfriesshire

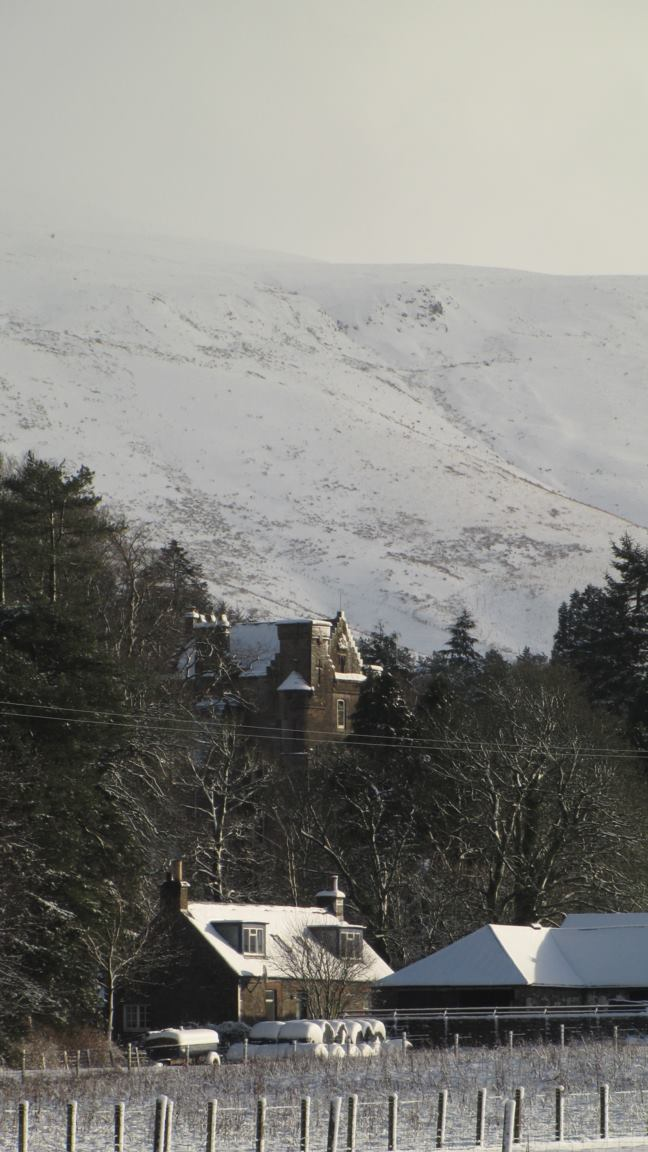
Arkleton Steading with Arkleton House and Arkleton Hill behind

Arkleton is a mansion and estate in the civil parish of Ewes, in Dumfries and Galloway, Scotland.

Arkleton House was built in 1860/1884 and incorporates stone from Arkleton tower which stood nearby for 300 years until the early 19th Century. It was the home of Dorothy and Walter Scott-Elliot who were murdered by their butler in 1977. The estate includes the 521m peak of Arkleton Hill which is part of the Langholm – Newcastleton Hills Site of Special Scientific Interest and Special Protection Area.

The Arkleton Trust was founded in 1977 “to study new approaches to rural development and education”. It was named after Arkleton which was the home of its founder John Higgs and used for seminars in the early days of the charity.
