= Rudolph Putnam Messel =

Rudolph Putnam Messel (28 November 1904 – 3 May 1958) was a British filmmaker, author, and political activist.

Messel was educated at Eton College and Merton College, Oxford. While at Oxford, he was a member of the Hypocrites' Club and became part of a film unit, working with Evelyn Waugh, Alec Waugh, Anthony Bushell and Hugh Molson. His works include This Film Business, an early book on the history of film, and High Pressure, a novel. He attempted to found a colony in South America for European political exiles, and wrote about the experience in Refuge in the Andes.

Messel was also active in socialist politics. He contributed film criticism for The Clarion, edited Socialist Review, and founded Fact. He stood unsuccessfully for the Labour Party in South Molton at the 1929 and 1931 United Kingdom general elections, in the 1932 Croydon South by-election, and in Birmingham Aston at the 1935 United Kingdom general election. He worked as an interpreter for George Lansbury on overseas visits, the two sharing a belief in pacifism, and made two films for the party, The Road to Hell, and Blow, Bugles, Blow.

During World War II, Messel served as an ARP Warden, and he left the Labour Party over its support for the conflict. After the war, he converted to Catholicism, and married Judith Birdwood, daughter of William Birdwood. He retired to a farm on Whiddon Down in Devon, and wrote an unpublished novel based on his experiences there, Red Earth.

Messel died suddenly in May 1958, while visiting Spain.
