= Croydon (constituency) =

Parliamentary constituency in the United Kingdom, 1885–1918

- Former borough constituency for the House of Commons
- Boundary of Croydon in Surrey for the 1910 general election
- County: Surrey
- Major settlements: Croydon, Addiscombe, Norbury, South Croydon, South Norwood, Thornton Heath, Upper Norwood

1885–1918
- Seats: One
- Created from: East Surrey (leaving its bulk, continued)
- Replaced by: Croydon North and Croydon South

Croydon was a constituency in the House of Commons of the UK Parliament from 1885 to 1918. As with most in its lifetime following the Redistribution of Seats Act 1885, it was a seat, that elected one Member of Parliament (MP) by the first past the post system of election.

It was won for all but three years by the Conservative candidate, the exception being the years 1906-1909 when that party, as a fellow Unionist party against Irish Home Rule and other devolution in a spell of widespread popular decline held a general meeting endorsing instead H. O. Arnold-Forster, a Liberal Unionist. His 3.2% victory against the candidate of the rest of the Liberal Party coupled with a 20.2% performance for Labour in Croydon which coincided with a Liberal landslide — the First Asquith ministry which brought in the fundamental constitutional reform of the Parliament Act 1911 after the delay for "the People's Budget" to be implemented. He died in 1909 causing a by-election and his party, with its occasional candidates in the region, no longer stood for the Croydon seat nor its north–south successors after 1918. The Labour Party fielded a candidate for the second time in the 1909 by-election, polling badly, winning about a fifth of the 1906 vote; the party fielded none in the 1910 elections for this seat.

== Boundaries ==
1885–1918: The municipal borough of Croydon.

This seat was covered an area based on the town of Croydon. Croydon had been a Municipal Borough from 1883 and was to become a County Borough in 1889. By 1902, at the latest, the parliamentary and local government boroughs had the same boundaries.

The Royal Commission on London Traffic, which reported in 1906, included the borough in its definition of Greater London. It was throughout in the north-east of Surrey. Its area has been included in Greater London since 1965.

From 1918 Croydon was divided into two borough constituencies - Croydon North and Croydon South.

== History ==
The 1906 election saw for the first time a majority of seats in London's metropolitan area align with the Liberal party; the Liberal Unionist candidate here was a compromise reached by the Conservatives and non-Home Rule for Ireland Liberals calculated to prevent a loss to a Liberal candidate.

The constituency was close enough to London and built-up enough to be considered part of a greater London or "Metropolitan" area.

A large part of the inhabitants of this constituency commuted to work in the City of London. It was however an area where attendance at Nonconformist chapels exceeded that at Anglican churches, according to the Daily News survey of 1902. By the time of the 1911 census more factories had been set up and a large artisan population had moved in so its core and north in particular was decidedly lower-income working-class.

The constituency was in general Conservative, but less strongly so than many suburban commuter seats around London. The Labour Party secured 20% of the vote, in a three-way contest, in the 1906 election.

Borough rather than a County seat

The seat being a parliamentary borough made for a lower level of election expenses permissible and the usual office/status for the returning officer.

== Members of Parliament ==
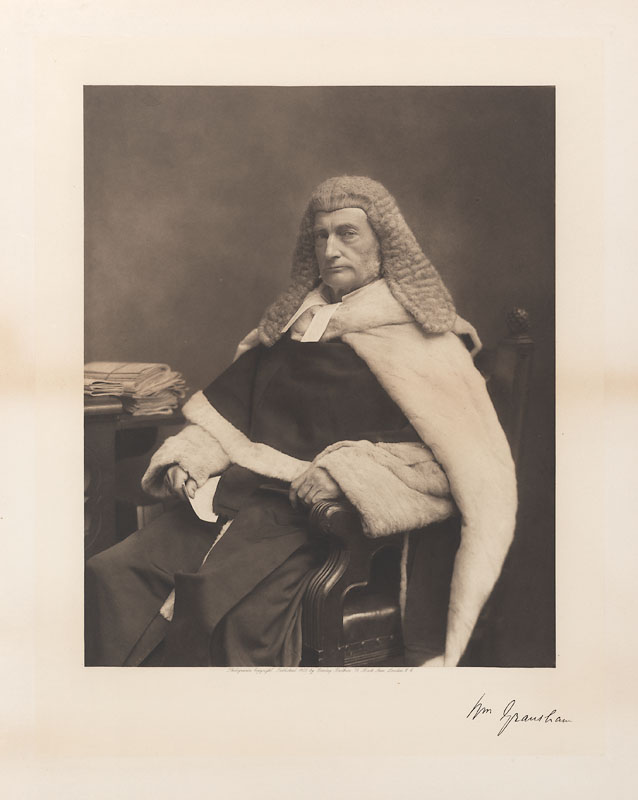
W. Grantham

Year	Member	Party
1885	William Grantham	Conservative
1886	Sidney Herbert	Conservative
1895	Charles Ritchie	Conservative
1906	H. O. Arnold-Forster	Liberal Unionist
1909	Sir Robert Hermon-Hodge	Conservative
1910	Ian Malcolm	Conservative
1918	constituency abolished	

== Election results ==
=== Elections in the 1880s ===
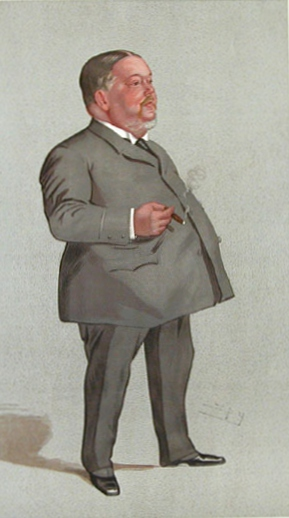
Jabez Balfour

General election 1885: Croydon
Party	Candidate	Votes	%	±%
Conservative	William Grantham	5,484	56.0	
Liberal	Jabez Balfour	4,315	44.0	
Majority		1,169	12.0	
Turnout		9,799	77.7	
Registered electors		12,619		
Conservative win (new seat)				

Grantham resigned after being appointed a judge of the Queen's Bench Division of the High Court of Justice, causing a by-election.

Sydney Buxton

By-election, 27 Jan 1886: Croydon
Party	Candidate	Votes	%	±%
Conservative	Sidney Herbert	5,205	53.9	−2.1
Liberal	Sydney Buxton	4,458	46.1	+2.1
Majority		747	7.8	−4.2
Turnout		9,663	76.6	−1.1
Registered electors		12,619		
Conservative hold		Swing	-2.1	

General election 1886: Croydon
Party	Candidate	Votes	%	±%
Conservative	Sidney Herbert	Unopposed		
Conservative hold				

Herbert was appointed a Lord Commissioner of the Treasury, requiring a by-election.

By-election, 11 Aug 1886: Croydon
Party	Candidate	Votes	%	±%
Conservative	Sidney Herbert	Unopposed		
Conservative hold				

=== Elections in the 1890s ===
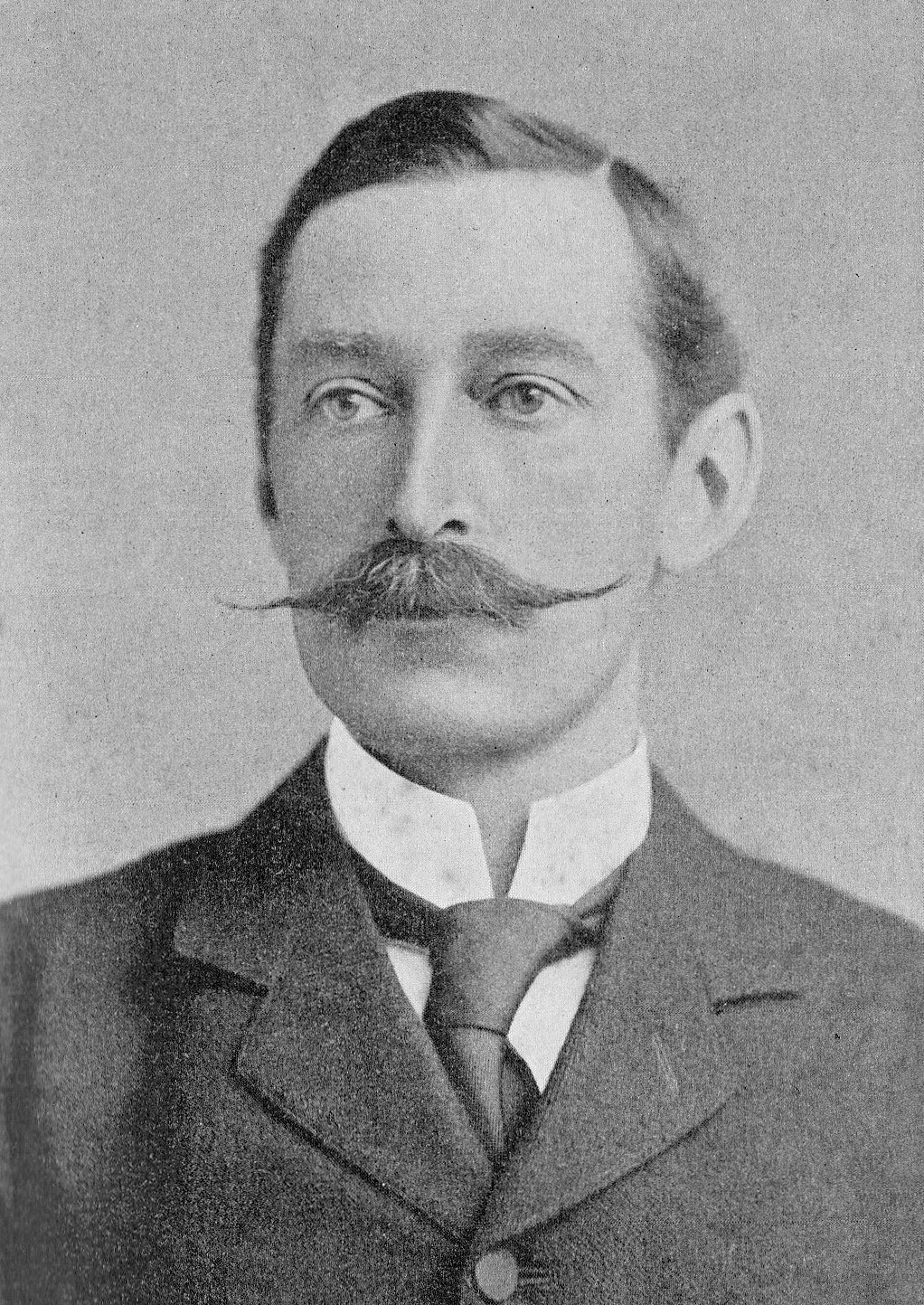
Sidney Herbert

General election 1892: Croydon
Party	Candidate	Votes	%	±%
Conservative	Sidney Herbert	6,528	57.5	N/A
Liberal	Edward William Grimwade	4,834	42.5	New
Majority		1,694	15.0	N/A
Turnout		11,362	76.6	N/A
Registered electors		14,837		
Conservative hold		Swing	N/A	

Herbert's succession to the peerage causes a by-election.

May 1895 Croydon by-election
Party	Candidate	Votes	%	±%
Conservative	Charles Ritchie	Unopposed		
Conservative hold				

Ritchie's appointment as President of the Board of Trade causes a by-election.

July 1895 Croydon by-election
Party	Candidate	Votes	%	±%
Conservative	Charles Ritchie	Unopposed		
Conservative hold				

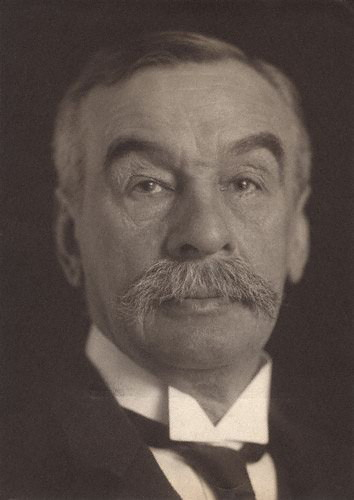
Charles Ritchie

General election 1895: Croydon
Party	Candidate	Votes	%	±%
Conservative	Charles Ritchie	6,876	59.7	+2.2
Liberal	Christopher Clarke Hutchinson	4,647	40.3	−2.2
Majority		2,229	19.4	+4.4
Turnout		11,523	71.3	−5.3
Registered electors		16,152		
Conservative hold		Swing	+2.2	

=== Elections in the 1900s ===
General election 1900: Croydon
Party	Candidate	Votes	%	±%
Conservative	Charles Ritchie	Unopposed		
Conservative hold				

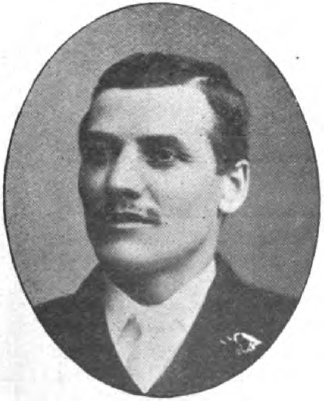
Stranks

General election 1906: Croydon
Party	Candidate	Votes	%	±%
Liberal Unionist	H. O. Arnold-Forster	8,211	41.5	N/A
Liberal	Henry Charles Augustus Somerset	7,573	38.3	New
Labour Repr. Cmte.	Sidney Stranks	4,007	20.2	New
Majority		638	3.2	N/A
Turnout		19,791	83.0	N/A
Registered electors		23,858		
Liberal Unionist hold		Swing	N/A	

Raphael

1909 Croydon by-election
Party	Candidate	Votes	%	±%
Conservative	Robert Hermon-Hodge	11,989	57.4	+15.9
Liberal	John Raphael	8,041	38.4	+0.1
Labour	Frank Smith	886	4.2	−16.0
Majority		3,948	19.0	+15.8
Turnout		20,916	79.0	−4.0
Registered electors		26,470		
Conservative hold		Swing	+7.9	

=== Elections in the 1910s ===
Hermon-Hodge

General election January 1910: Croydon
Party	Candidate	Votes	%	±%
Conservative	Robert Hermon-Hodge	12,223	51.9	−5.5'"`UNIQ−−ref−00000046−QINU`"'
Liberal	Arthur Lewis Leon	11,327	48.1	+9.7'"`UNIQ−−ref−00000047−QINU`"'
Majority		896	3.8	N/A
Turnout		23,550	86.1	+3.1
Registered electors		27,350		
Conservative hold		Swing	+0.3	

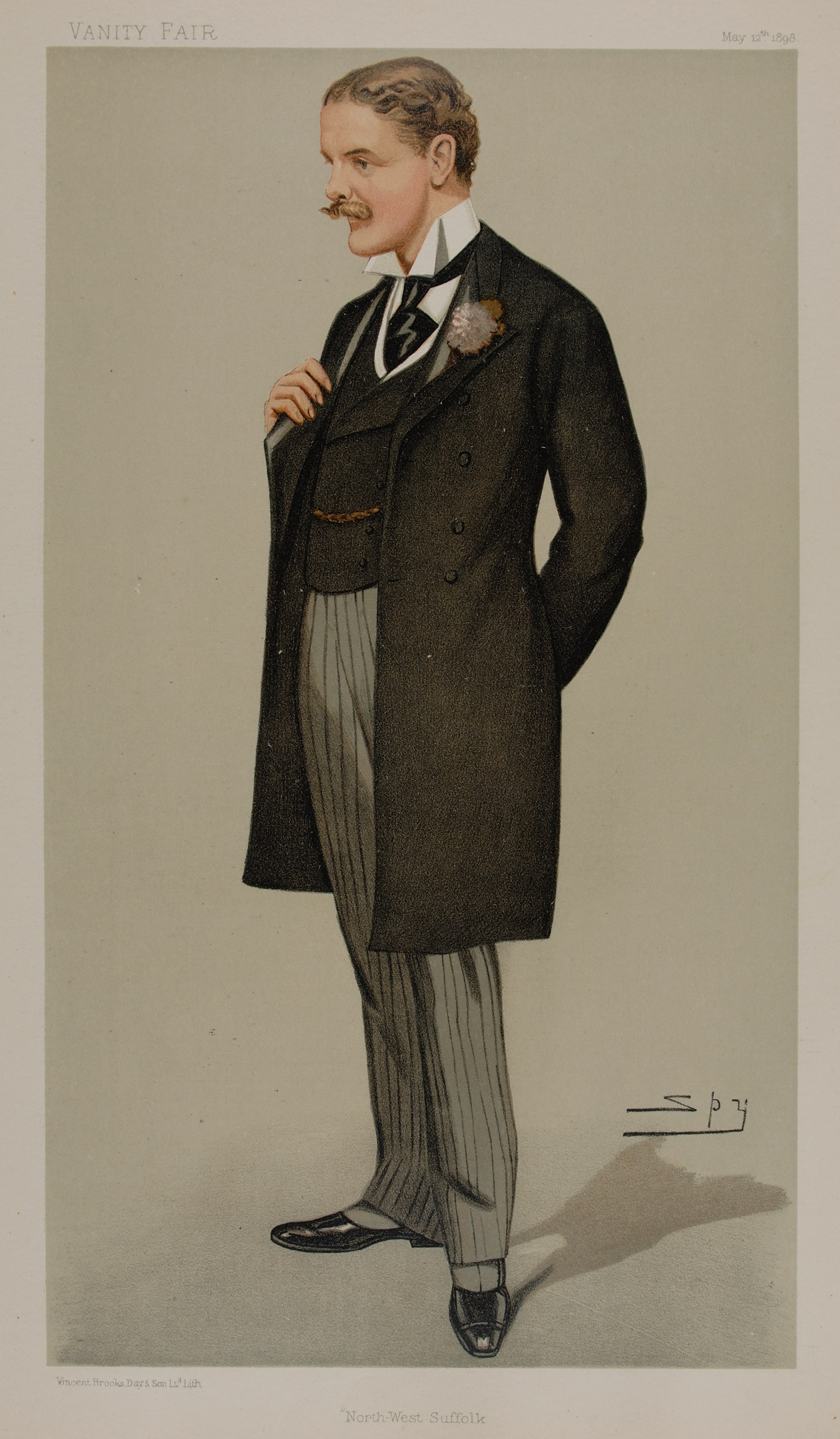
Ian Malcolm

General election December 1910: Croydon
Party	Candidate	Votes	%	±%
Conservative	Ian Malcolm	11,875	53.4	+1.5
Liberal	Arthur Lewis Leon	10,343	46.6	−1.5
Majority		1,532	6.8	+3.0
Turnout		22,218	81.2	−4.9
Registered electors		27,350		
Conservative hold		Swing	+1.5	

General Election 1914–15:

Another General Election was required to take place before the end of 1915. The political parties had been making preparations for an election to take place and by July 1914, the following candidates had been selected;

- Unionist: Ian Malcolm
- Liberal:

== See also ==
- List of former United Kingdom Parliament constituencies
