= Accrington (constituency) =

Parliamentary constituency in the United Kingdom, 1885–1983

- Former borough constituency for the House of Commons
- Accrington in Lancashire, showing boundaries used from 1974–1983
- County: Lancashire
- Borough: Accrington

1918–1983
- Seats: 1
- Replaced by: Hyndburn

1885–1918
- Seats: 1
- Type of constituency: County constituency
- Created from: North East Lancashire

Accrington was a parliamentary constituency of the House of Commons of the Parliament of the United Kingdom from 1885 to 1983. It elected one Member of Parliament (MP) by the first-past-the-post system of election.

== History ==
The constituency was created by the Redistribution of Seats Act 1885 for the 1885 general election. The original county constituency of North East Lancashire was replaced by a borough constituency for the 1918 general election. The constituency was based on the town of Accrington.

From the 1983 general election, the constituency was abolished. The successor seat was Hyndburn, named after the local government area including the town of Accrington. 85.5% of the new seat came from the former Accrington constituency.

== Boundaries ==
This constituency was part of the historic county of Lancashire in North West England.

=== 1885–1918 ===
The constituency, officially named North East Lancashire, Accrington Division consisted of the Municipal Borough of Accrington, and the parishes of Altham, Church, Clayton-le-Moors, Hapton, Huncoat, Oswaldtwistle, and Rishton.

Neighbouring constituencies were Blackburn to the south west and Burnley to the north east and Darwen to the north. Accrington also had short boundaries with Clitheroe at both its north and east borders and Rossendale to the south and south east.

=== 1918–1950 ===
The Representation of the People Act 1918 reorganised constituencies throughout Great Britain and Ireland. Constituencies were defined in terms of the districts created by the Local Government Act 1894.

The Parliamentary Borough of Accrington consisted of the Municipal Borough of Accrington and the Urban Districts of Church, Clayton-le-Moors, Oswaldtwistle, and Rishton. The three parishes of Altham, Hapton and Huncoat passed to the Clitheroe constituency.

=== 1950–1983 ===
The Representation of the People Act 1948 replaced the term "parliamentary borough" with "borough constituency". The Accrington Borough Constituency was defined in the same terms as in the 1918 legislation. However, there were boundary changes reflecting local government changes in the 1930s: the Huncoat area rejoined the constituency as the parish had been absorbed by the Borough of Accrington, while an enlargement of the county borough of Blackburn took away part of Rishton. These boundaries were first used in the 1950 general election.

=== Abolition ===
In 1974 local government in England and Wales was reorganised. However, parliamentary boundaries were not altered until 1983. The Parliamentary Constituencies (England) Order 1983 created new constituencies based on the new districts. A new Hyndburn Borough Constituency was formed. The new seat included the whole of the Accrington constituency with the addition of Altham and Great Harwood.

== Members of Parliament ==
Election	Member	Party
1885	Frederick William Grafton	Liberal
1886	Robert Hodge	Conservative
1892	Sir Joseph Leese	Liberal
1910	Harold Baker	Liberal
1918	Ernest Gray	Conservative
1922	Charles Buxton	Labour
1923	Hugh Edwards	Liberal
1929	Tom Snowden	Labour
1931	Henry Procter	Conservative
1945	Walter Scott-Elliot	Labour
1950	Henry Hynd	Labour
1966	Arthur Davidson	Labour
1983	constituency abolished – see Hyndburn	

== Elections ==
=== Elections in the 1880s ===
1885 general election: Accrington
Party	Candidate	Votes	%	±%
Liberal	Frederick William Grafton	5,320	52.4	
Conservative	Robert Hermon-Hodge	4,842	47.6	
Majority		478	4.8	
Turnout		10,162	94.1	
Registered electors		10,797		
Liberal win (new seat)				

1886 general election: Accrington
Party	Candidate	Votes	%	±%
Conservative	Robert Hermon-Hodge	4,971	51.1	+3.5
Liberal	Joseph Leese	4,751	48.9	−3.5
Majority		220	2.2	N/A
Turnout		9,722	90.0	−4.1
Registered electors		10,797		
Conservative gain from Liberal		Swing	+3.5	

=== Elections in the 1890s ===
Joseph Leese

1892 general election: Accrington
Party	Candidate	Votes	%	±%
Liberal	Joseph Leese	6,019	52.4	+3.5
Conservative	Robert Hermon-Hodge	5,472	47.6	−3.5
Majority		547	4.8	N/A
Turnout		11,491	93.4	+3.4
Registered electors		12,309		
Liberal gain from Conservative		Swing	+3.5	

1893 Accrington by-election
Party	Candidate	Votes	%	±%
Liberal	Joseph Leese	5,822	51.1	−1.3
Conservative	Robert Hermon-Hodge	5,564	48.9	+1.3
Majority		258	2.2	−2.6
Turnout		11,386	92.1	−1.3
Registered electors		12,361		
Liberal hold		Swing	−1.3	

1895 general election: Accrington
Party	Candidate	Votes	%	±%
Liberal	Joseph Leese	6,168	51.4	−1.0
Conservative	William Mitchell	5,828	48.6	+1.0
Majority		340	2.8	−2.0
Turnout		11,996	93.5	+0.1
Registered electors		12,832		
Liberal hold		Swing	−1.0	

=== Elections in the 1900s ===
1900 general election: Accrington
Party	Candidate	Votes	%	±%
Liberal	Joseph Leese	6,585	50.6	−0.8
Conservative	Edward E Nicholls	5,993	46.1	−2.5
Independent Labour	John Hempsall (Note: Nominee of the local branches of the Independent Labour Party and Social Democratic Federation but repudiated by both national headquarters)	433	3.3	New
Majority		592	4.5	+1.7
Turnout		13,011	91.5	−2.0
Registered electors		14,221		
Liberal hold		Swing	+0.9	

1906 general election: Accrington
Party	Candidate	Votes	%	±%
Liberal	Joseph Leese	7,209	56.8	+6.2
Social Democratic Federation	Dan Irving	4,852	38.3	New
Independent Labour	S. M. Holden	619	4.9	New
Majority		2,357	18.5	+14.0
Turnout		12,680	82.9	−8.6
Registered electors		15,301		
Liberal hold		Swing	N/A	

=== Elections in the 1910s ===
Harold Baker

January 1910 general election: Accrington
Party	Candidate	Votes	%	±%
Liberal	Harold Baker	8,968	58.1	+1.3
Conservative	Albert Henry Jessel	6,455	41.9	New
Majority		2,513	16.2	−2.3
Turnout		15,423	94.6	+11.7
Registered electors		16,297		
Liberal hold		Swing	N/A	

December 1910 general election: Accrington
Party	Candidate	Votes	%	±%
Liberal	Harold Baker	8,129	55.7	−2.4
Conservative	Ernest Gray	6,461	44.3	+2.4
Majority		1,668	11.4	−4.8
Turnout		14,590	89.5	−5.1
Registered electors		16,297		
Liberal hold		Swing	−2.4	

General Election 1914–15:

Another General Election was required to take place before the end of 1915. The political parties had been making preparations for an election to take place and by July 1914, the following candidates had been selected;

- Labour: James Bell
- Liberal: Harold Baker
- Unionist: Ernest Gray

1918 general election: Accrington
Party		Candidate	Votes	%	±%
C	Unionist	Ernest Gray	13,808	47.2	+2.9
	Liberal	Harold Baker	8,378	28.6	−27.1
	Labour	Charles Buxton	6,369	21.7	New
	National Democratic	William Hammond	738	2.5	New
Majority			5,430	18.6	N/A
Turnout			28,555	69.5	−20.0
	Unionist gain from Liberal		Swing	+15.0	
C indicates candidate endorsed by the coalition government.

=== Elections in the 1920s ===
Charles Buxton

1922 general election: Accrington
Party	Candidate	Votes	%	±%
Labour	Charles Buxton	16,462	44.3	+22.6
Unionist	Ernest Gray	11,408	30.6	−16.6
Liberal	Harold Baker	9,395	25.1	−3.5
Majority		5,054	13.7	N/A
Turnout		37,265	88.7	+19.2
Labour gain from Unionist		Swing	+19.6	

1923 general election: Accrington
Party	Candidate	Votes	%	±%
Liberal	Hugh Edwards	19,981	54.3	+29.2
Labour	Charles Buxton	16,793	45.7	+1.4
Majority		3,188	8.6	N/A
Turnout		36,774	86.5	−2.2
Liberal gain from Labour		Swing	+13.9	

1924 general election: Accrington
Party	Candidate	Votes	%	±%
Constitutionalist	Hugh Edwards	20,391	52.9	N/A
Labour	Charles Buxton	18,148	47.1	+1.4
Majority		2,243	5.8	−2.8
Turnout		38,539	90.1	+3.6
Constitutionalist hold		Swing		

1929 general election: Accrington
Party	Candidate	Votes	%	±%
Labour	Tom Snowden	25,336	52.3	+5.2
Liberal	Hugh Edwards	23,110	47.7	−5.2
Majority		2,226	4.6	N/A
Turnout		48,446	88.7	−1.4
Labour gain from Liberal		Swing	+5.2	

=== Elections in the 1930s ===
1931 general election: Accrington
Party	Candidate	Votes	%	±%
Conservative	Henry Procter	30,799	62.89	
Labour	Tom Snowden	18,177	37.11	
Majority		12,622	25.78	N/A
Turnout		48,976		
Conservative gain from Labour		Swing		

1935 general election: Accrington
Party	Candidate	Votes	%	±%
Conservative	Henry Procter	25,273	54.4	−8.5
Labour	Frederick George Burgess	21,203	45.6	+8.5
Majority		4,070	8.8	−17.0
Turnout		32,696	67.7	
Conservative hold		Swing		

=== Elections in the 1940s ===
General Election 1939–40:

Another General Election was required to take place before the end of 1940. The political parties had been making preparations for an election to take place and by the July 1939, the following candidates had been selected;

- Conservative: Henry Procter
- Labour: Walter Scott-Elliot
- British Union: Doreen Bell

1945 general election: Accrington
Party	Candidate	Votes	%	±%
Labour	Walter Scott-Elliot	21,102	48.65	
Conservative	Henry Procter	16,025	36.95	
Liberal	Gerald Vernon Mortimer	6,247	14.40	
Majority		5,077	11.70	N/A
Turnout		43,374	83.27	
Labour gain from Conservative		Swing		

=== Elections in the 1950s ===
1950 general election: Accrington
Party	Candidate	Votes	%	±%
Labour	Henry Hynd	23,295	48.82	
Conservative	Henry Procter	19,022	39.86	
Liberal	Arthur Kenneth Blakeman	5,403	11.32	
Majority		4,273	8.96	
Turnout		47,720	91.01	
Labour hold		Swing		

1951 general election: Accrington
Party	Candidate	Votes	%	±%
Labour	Henry Hynd	24,802	52.31	
Conservative	Francis Henry Gerard Heron Goodhart	22,611	47.69	
Majority		2,191	4.62	
Turnout		47,413	89.96	
Labour hold		Swing		

1955 general election: Accrington
Party	Candidate	Votes	%	±%
Labour	Henry Hynd	22,502	51.5	−0.8
Conservative	Dennis C. Walls	21,157	48.5	+0.8
Majority		1,345	3.0	−1.6
Turnout		43,659	85.7	−4.3
Labour hold		Swing		

1959 general election: Accrington
Party	Candidate	Votes	%	±%
Labour	Harry Hynd	22,242	50.7	−0.8
Conservative	Martin Henry	21,642	49.3	+0.8
Majority		600	1.4	−1.6
Turnout		43,884	87.9	+2.2
Labour hold		Swing	−0.8	

=== Elections in the 1960s ===
1964 general election: Accrington
Party	Candidate	Votes	%	±%
Labour	Harry Hynd	20,561	49.7	−1.0
Conservative	Victor Montagu	15,143	36.6	−12.7
Liberal	Terence Anthony Maher	5,653	13.7	New
Majority		5,418	13.1	+11.7
Turnout		41,357	84.5	−3.4
Labour hold		Swing		

1966 general election: Accrington
Party	Candidate	Votes	%	±%
Labour	Arthur Davidson	21,330	53.0	+3.3
Conservative	David L. Maxwell	14,508	36.1	−0.5
Liberal	Julian H.S. Gould	4,375	10.9	−2.8
Majority		6,822	16.9	+3.8
Turnout		40,213	83.1	−1.4
Labour hold		Swing	+1.9	

=== Elections in the 1970s ===
1970 general election: Accrington
Party	Candidate	Votes	%	±%
Labour	Arthur Davidson	20,828	50.7	−2.3
Conservative	Reginald C. Webster	20,234	49.3	+13.2
Majority		594	1.4	−15.5
Turnout		41,062	80.2	−2.9
Labour hold		Swing	−7.8	

February 1974 general election: Accrington
Party	Candidate	Votes	%	±%
Labour	Arthur Davidson	20,050	47.5	−3.2
Conservative	Alan d'Arcy Fearn	15,018	35.5	−13.2
Liberal	W.I. Cooper	7,191	17.0	New
Majority		5,032	12.0	+10.6
Turnout		42,259	83.9	+3.7
Labour hold		Swing	+5.2	

October 1974 general election: Accrington
Party	Candidate	Votes	%	±%
Labour	Arthur Davidson	19,838	49.2	+1.7
Conservative	J. McLaughlin	13,618	33.8	−1.7
Liberal	W I Cooper	5,704	14.1	−2.9
National Front	David Riley	1,176	2.9	New
Majority		6,220	15.4	+3.4
Turnout		40,336	79.37	−4.5
Labour hold		Swing	+1.8	

1979 general election: Accrington
Party	Candidate	Votes	%	±%
Labour	Arthur Davidson	19,576	48.9	−0.3
Conservative	A. Cheetham	16,282	40.7	+6.9
Liberal	R. Holden	3,646	9.11	−5.0
National Front	David Riley	508	1.3	−1.6
Majority		3,294	8.23	−7.2
Turnout		40,012	78.7	−0.7
Labour hold		Swing	−3.6	

== Sources ==
- Leigh Rayment's Historical List of MPs – Constituencies beginning with "A" (part 1)
- Boundaries of Parliamentary Constituencies 1885–1972, compiled and edited by F.W.S. Craig (Parliamentary Reference Publications 1972)
- British Parliamentary Constituencies: A Statistical Compendium, by Ivor Crewe and Anthony Fox (Faber and Faber 1984)
- British Parliamentary Election Results 1885–1918, compiled and edited by F.W.S. Craig (Macmillan Press 1974)
- British Parliamentary Election Results 1918–1949, compiled and edited by F.W.S. Craig (Macmillan Press, revised edition 1977)
- British Parliamentary Election Results 1950–1973, compiled and edited by F.W.S. Craig (Parliamentary Research Services 1983)
- Who's Who of British Members of Parliament, Volume II 1886–1918, edited by M. Stenton and S. Lees (Harvester Press 1978)
- Who's Who of British Members of Parliament, Volume III 1919–1945, edited by M. Stenton and S. Lees (Harvester Press 1979)
- Who's Who of British Members of Parliament, Volume IV 1945–1979, edited by M. Stenton and S. Lees (Harvester Press 1981)
