= H. T. Muggeridge =

British politician

H.T. Muggeridge

Member of Parliament for Romford
- In office 30 May 1929 – 27 October 1931
- Preceded by: Charles Rhys
- Succeeded by: William Hutchison

Personal details
- Born: Henry Thomas Muggeridge; 26 June 1864 Penge, London, England
- Died: 25 March 1942 (aged 77) Hastings, East Sussex, England
- Party: Labour
- Spouse: Annie Booler
- Relatives: Malcolm Muggeridge (son)

Henry Thomas Muggeridge (26 June 1864 – 25 March 1942) was a British politician. He was the father of the author and journalist Malcolm Muggeridge and also Eric Muggeridge, who is one of the founders of Plan International.

== Life ==
Muggeridge was born the son of undertaker Henry Ambrose Muggeridge in Penge, which was then a small village but is now incorporated into the city of London, on 26 June 1864. When the family was abandoned by his father, Muggeridge left school and began work as an office boy in the City of London. The little money he kept for himself was spent on books, and it was his avid lunchtime reading that led to a keen interest in politics. His second job was again as an office boy for a firm of shirtmakers, where he stayed until he retired. He eventually became Company Secretary, but had turned down a directorship, as he felt it would be at odds with his political principles.

In 1893, Muggeridge married Annie Booler, the daughter of a Sheffield factory foreman, and they had five sons, Malcolm being the middle child. Malcolm Muggeridge's biographer Richard Ingrams described H.T. as "a small bearded man with a large frame, a twinkling eye, and a rather bulbous nose which he passed on to his son." Malcolm's first name, Thomas, was chosen by H.T. in honor of his hero Thomas Carlyle.

One of Malcolm's quoted memories of his father is of his visits to the Surrey Street Market, where he would set up his platform and expound his views on the need for socialism: "Now ladies and gentlemen. It's His Majesty's Government, His Majesty's Navy, His Majesty's Stationery Office, His Majesty's this and His Majesty's that. But it's the National Debt. Why isn't that His Majesty's? We'll gladly let His Majesty have that, won't we?"

Muggeridge's early interest in politics at first led to his joining the Penge Liberals, and with them he campaigned for local improvements. By his late twenties he was a socialist, and he joined first the Fabians, then the Independent Labour Party. An excellent public speaker, he founded and became secretary of the Croydon Socialist Society in 1895, and stood for the Croydon Borough Council in Norwood in 1896 and 1897. He was not to be successful until November 1911, although Croydon had already had several Labour councillors. Muggeridge was the first President of Ruskin House, the Labour and Trade Union centre in Croydon, having been instrumental in its relocation and refounding.

Muggeridge remained a Croydon councillor until 1930, at which time he also became a Justice of the Peace. He was instrumental in getting Croydon's first council houses built and campaigned for Trade Union rates of pay for all municipal employees.

Although he stood for Parliament in Croydon South four times, in 1918, 1922, 1923, and 1924, Muggeridge finally became a member of parliament for Romford in 1929. He lost his seat in 1931 and returned to Croydon Council in 1933, retiring in 1940, at the age of 75.

== Death ==
He died in Hastings, East Sussex, in 1942 and was buried in Whatlington, near Battle, East Sussex.

Parliament of the United Kingdom
| Preceded by Charles Rhys | Member of Parliament for Romford; 1929–1931 | Succeeded by W. G. Hutchison |
