= SBM =

SBM may stand for:

== Science, technology, international development ==
- Satellite-based monitoring, transport tracking systems via GPS technologies
- SBm, a type of barred spiral irregular galaxy
- School business manager, member of non-teaching staff responsible for non-teaching activity
- Science-Based Medicine a blog about evidence supported healthcare
- Single buoy mooring, mooring point and interconnect for tankers loading or offloading
- Sociedade Brasileira de Matemática "Brazilian Mathematical Society" is a professional association founded in 1969.
- Stochastic block model, a generative model for random graphs
- Super Bit Mapping, a noise shaping process developed by Sony
- Swachh Bharat Mission, the "Clean India Mission" from 2014 onwards

== Transportation ==
- Sheboygan County Memorial Airport's IATA code
- Shepherd's Bush Market tube station, London, London Underground station code
- South Bermondsey railway station, London, National Rail station code

== Organizations and locations ==
- SBM Offshore, a Dutch-based oil services company
- Société des Bains de Mer de Monaco, owner and operator of casinos and hotels in the Principality of Monaco
- SoftBank Corp., formerly SoftBank Mobile, a subsidiary of SoftBank Group
- State Bank of Mauritius
- State Bank of Mysore
- St Barbara (company), Australian gold mining company
