= L. Hamilton McCormick =

American author, inventor, and collector (1859–1934)

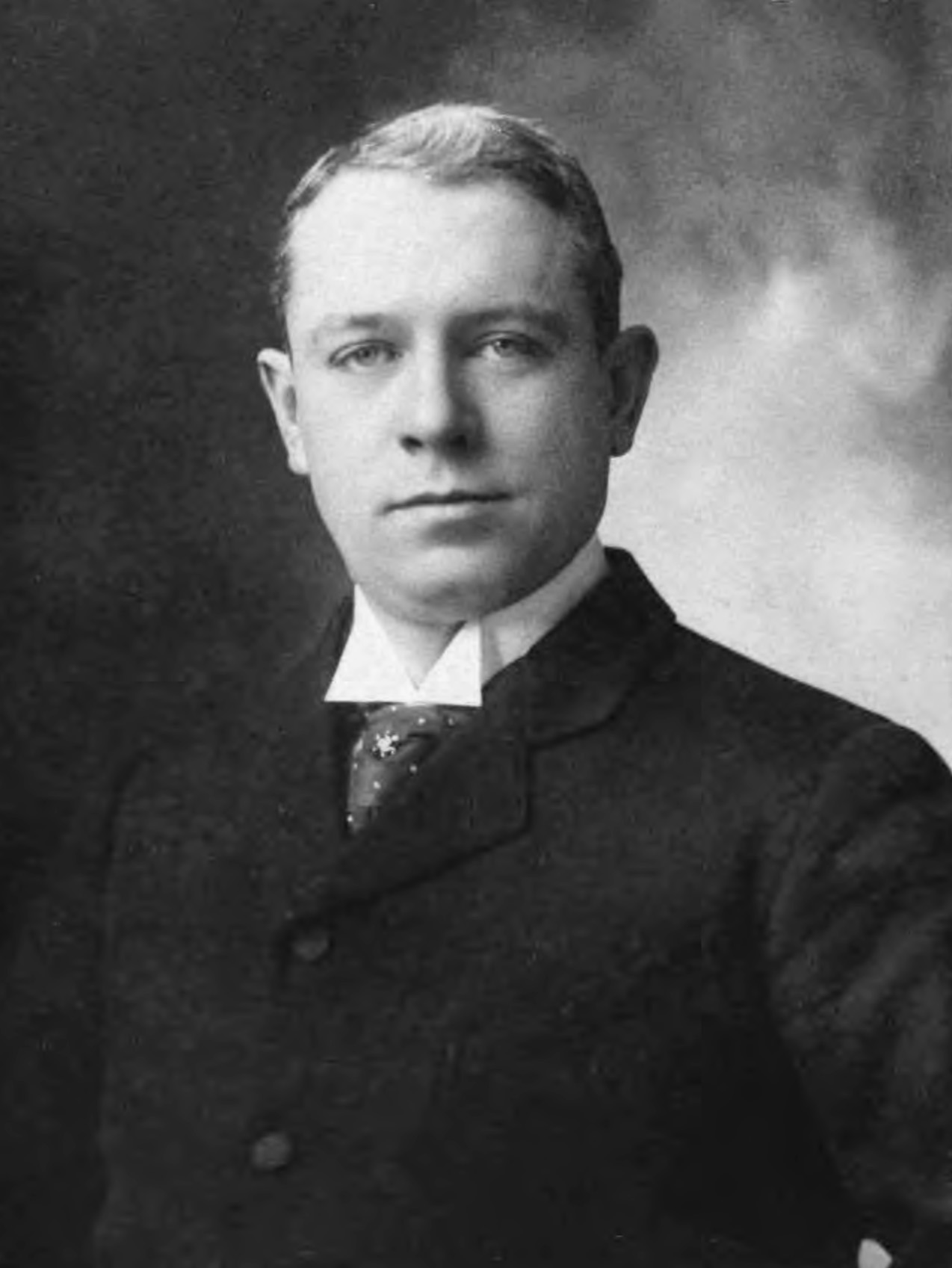
- About 1896
- Born: Leander Hamilton McCormick; May 27, 1859; Chicago
- Died: February 2, 1934 (aged 74)
- Education: Phillips Academy; Columbia Law School
- Alma mater: Amherst College
- Spouse: Constance Plummer (m. 1887)
- Children: 3
- Parent(s): Leander J. McCormick; Henrietta Hamilton McCormick

Leander Hamilton McCormick (May 27, 1859 – February 2, 1934) was an American writer, inventor, art collector and sculptor.

== Early life ==
McCormick (as he was known) was born in Chicago, May 27, 1859. He was the youngest of four children born to Henrietta (née Hamilton) McCormick and Leander J. McCormick.

His grandfather Robert McCormick of Virginia invented agricultural machinery. His father, Leander J. McCormick, came to Chicago in 1848 and was a partner with his brothers, Cyrus and William to form what would become International Harvester.

At the age of fourteen, McCormick invented a non-pickable door lock. While at college he invented two automatic railroad car couplers and a ballot box to register votes and prevent fraud at the polls. His principal sport in youth was boxing. He was one of the founders of the Amherst chapter of the Beta Theta Pi Society. McCormick received his education principally at Phillips Academy, Andover, and at Amherst College, graduating in the class of 1881.

== Interests and collections ==
After graduating from Amherst he resided for several years in New York City, where he took a course in law at Columbia Law School in New York City and studied architecture. He also devoted his time to his study of Characterology. After finishing his education he traveled in the United States, Europe, northern Africa, Mexico, Central America, Yucatan, the West Indies and the Bermudas.

He collected paintings, old armor, ancient pottery, old ivories, primitive glassware and objets d'art while living in London for seventeen years after his marriage. His art collection included 200 examples of the Italian, early English and old Dutch schools.

McCormick reportedly made over a hundred inventions and took out many patents. However, since he inherited a fortune, he did not need to earn a living. He claimed to have invented an aerial torpedo, motorcycles, eyeglasses for looking backward while driving, a watch which shows the time the world over, an electric rotary brush, an electric rotary razor, an apparatus to locate vessels in a fog at sea, a boat which will not rock in rough water, a quadricycle to lessen vibration upon rough roads, an hydroplane for skimming over the surface of the water, an ambulance to prevent shock or vibration to its occupant, an audiophone for theatre use, a water cycle, a scheme to bridge the English Channel, and finally at the end of the World War I an improvement in war tanks, which came just as hostilities ended.

During World War I, he was a government consultant at Washington, DC on financial, military and naval issues.

=== Sculptures ===
In sculpture his principal works were a three-quarter-life sized statue entitled "Sapho" one of "Victory," and a figure emblematic of "The Birth of a Spirit."

=== Books ===
He wrote two works on phrenology: Characterology: an exact science (1920) and Student's Course in Characterology: an exact science in fifteen lessons (1921). He also wrote on other related topics. These writings are dated and marred by the underlying assumptions of white supremacy, views which were not rare at the time.

=== Personal life ===
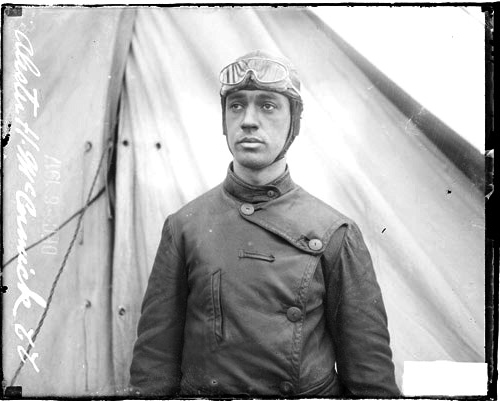
McCormick's son, Alister, 1917.

In 1886, while touring Europe, he met Constance Plummer (1865–1938), the daughter of Edward Plummer, of Canterbury, England, whom he married on February 15, 1887. Together, Hamilton and Constance were the parents of three sons:

- Leander J. McCormick (1888–1964), who married heiress Alice Cudahy, daughter of Edward Cudahy of the Cudahy Packing Company, in 1917. They divorced in Reno in 1929, and in 1933 he married Renée de Fleurieu Fontarce, the Countess de Fleurieu, and adopted both of her children from a previous marriage to Guy de Brotonne.
- Edward Hamilton McCormick (b. 1889), who married Phyllis Mary Samuelson, daughter of Sir Francis Samuelson, 3rd Baronet and granddaughter of Sir Bernhard Samuelson, 1st Baronet, on July 31, 1913. After their marriage, the couple settled in at Shaws, the Samuelson home in Weybridge.
- Alister Hamilton McCormick (b. 1891), who married Joan Tyndale Stevens, the daughter of Leonard Friswell Stevens and the niece of the Earl of Hastings. After their marriage, they lived in Chicago, and later, Santa Barbara, California.

He died on February 2, 1934 and was buried at Woodlawn Park Cemetery in Miami, Florida. To each of his widows and three sons he left a trust fund of $800,000.

=== Legacy ===
His mansion, at 100 E. Ontario Street, Chicago, has been the home of Lawry's The Prime Rib restaurant since the 1974. It is in the River North neighborhood just half a block off the Michigan Avenue shopping district.

=== Family tree ===
McCormick Chicago family tree

Robert McCormick Jr. (1780–1846)	Mary Ann Hall (1780–1853)
Nancy Fowler (1835–1923)	Cyrus Hall McCormick Sr. (1809–1884)	William Sanderson McCormick (1815–1865)	Mary Ann Grigsby (1828–1878)	Leander James McCormick (1819–1900)
Cyrus Hall McCormick Jr. (1859–1936)	Anita McCormick Blaine (1866–1954)	Harold Fowler McCormick (1872–1941)	Robert Sanderson McCormick (1849–1919)	William Grigsby McCormick (1851–1941)	Anna Reubenia McCormick (1860–1917)	Leander Hamilton McCormick (1859–1934)
Joseph Medill McCormick (1877–1925)	Ruth Hanna (1880–1944)	Robert Rutherford McCormick (1880–1955)	Chauncey Brooks McCormick (1884–1954)	William McCormick Blair Sr. (1884–1982)
Bazy Tankersley (1921-2013)	Hope Baldwin (1919–1993)	Brooks McCormick (1917–2006)	William McCormick Blair Jr. (1916–2015)

Notes:

See Chaim M. Rosenberg, The International Harvester Company: A History of the Founding Families and Their Machines (McFarland, 2019). online
