= Samuelson baronets =

Baronetcy in the Baronetage of the United Kingdom

The Samuelson baronetcy, of Bodicote in Banbury in the County of Oxford, is a title in the Baronetage of the United Kingdom. It was created on 29 July 1884 for Bernhard Samuelson, a businessman, Member of Parliament for Banbury in 1859 and from 1865 to 1885, continuing in the single-member Banbury division of Oxfordshire from 1885 to 1895. He was a pioneer of technical education, and the baronetcy was conferred on him for his services in that field.

The 2nd Baronet represented Cheltenham from 1868 to 1874, and then Frome from 1876 to 1885, in the House of Commons.

== Samuelson baronets, of Bodicote (1884) ==
- Sir Bernhard Samuelson, 1st Baronet (1820–1905)
- Sir Henry Bernhard Samuelson, 2nd Baronet (1845–1937)
- Sir Francis Arthur Edward Samuelson, 3rd Baronet (1861–1946)
- Sir Francis Henry Bernard Samuelson, 4th Baronet (1890–1981)
- Sir (Bernard) Michael Francis Samuelson, 5th Baronet (1917–2008)
- Sir James Francis Samuelson, 6th Baronet (born 1956)

The heir presumptive is Edward Bernard Samuelson (born 1967), younger brother of the present baronet.

Baronetage of the United Kingdom
Preceded by Bowman baronets	Samuelson baronets of Bodicote; 23 January 1884	Succeeded by Guinness baronets
