= Henry Tancred =

Henry Tancred may refer to:

- Henry Tancred (New Zealand politician) (1816–1884)
- Henry William Tancred (1781–1860), British politician
- Harry Tancred (Henry Eugene Tancred, 1897–1961), Australian rugby player, racing administrator and meat industry leader
