= 1922 Banbury by-election =

UK parliamentary by-election

The 1922 Banbury by-election was a parliamentary by-election held for the British House of Commons constituency of Banbury on 22 June 1922. The seat had become vacant upon the appointment of the sitting Coalition Liberal MP, Sir R Rhys-Williams, to become Recorder of Cardiff. This was an office of profit under the Crown and in accordance with the constitutional requirements of the day Rhys-Williams was obliged to resign his seat and fight a by-election.

No candidate from any other party came forward to challenge Rhys-Williams however and he was returned unopposed. Rhys-Williams continued as MP for Banbury until the general election in November 1922 when he stood down from Parliament to concentrate on his judicial responsibilities.

== See also ==
- 1918 Banbury by-election
- List of United Kingdom by-elections
- United Kingdom by-election records
