= Henry Samuelson =

English politician (1845–1937)

Sir Henry Samuelson, Bt JP KGStJ
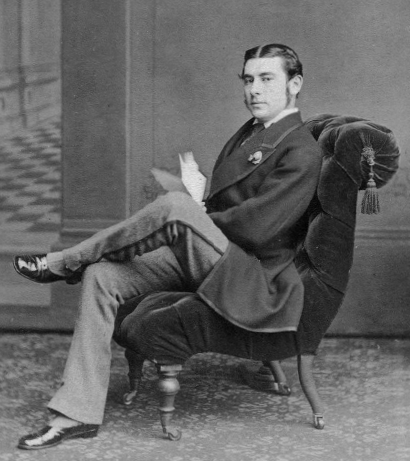
- Samuelson, 1860

Member of Parliament for Frome
- In office 1876–1885
- Preceded by: Henry Lopes
- Succeeded by: Lawrence James Baker

Member of Parliament for Cheltenham
- In office 1868–1874
- Preceded by: Charles Schreiber
- Succeeded by: James Agg-Gardner

Personal details
- Born: Henry Bernhard Samuelson; 30 September 1845
- Died: 14 March 1937 (aged 91)
- Political party: Liberal
- Spouse: Emily Maria Goodden
- Parent(s): Sir Bernhard Samuelson, 1st Baronet; Caroline Blundell
- Education: Rugby School
- Alma mater: Trinity College, Oxford

Sir Henry Bernhard Samuelson, 2nd Baronet JP KGStJ (30 September 1845 – 14 March 1937) was an English Liberal Party politician who sat in the House of Commons in two periods between 1868 and 1885.

== Early life ==
Samuelson was the son of Sir Bernhard Samuelson, 1st Baronet and his wife Caroline Blundell. After his mother's death, his father married Lelia Mathilda (née Serena) Denny, daughter of Chevalier Leon Serena and the widow of William Denny of Dumbarton. Among his siblings were Francis Arthur Edward Samuelson, Godfrey Blundell Samuelson, MP for Forest of Dean, and Sir Herbert Walter Samuelson, chairman and treasurer of University College Hospital.

His mother was a daughter of Henry Blundell of Hull and his paternal grandparents were Sarah (née Hertz) Samuelson and Samuel Hermann Samuelson, a Liverpool merchant.

He was educated at Rugby School and Trinity College, Oxford.

== Career ==
He was a captain in the Royal South Gloucester Militia and a J.P. for Somerset.

At the 1868 general election Samuelson was elected as the Member of Parliament (MP) for Cheltenham. He held the seat until his defeat at the 1874 general election. In November 1876 he was elected at a by-election as the MP for Frome, and held that seat until the 1885 general election, when he did not stand again.

Samuelson succeeded to the baronetcy on the death of his father in 1905.

== Personal life ==
Samuelson married Emily Maria (née Goodden) Butler, daughter of John Goodden of Compton House, in Over Compton, Dorset. Emily was the widow of Arthur Paulet Butler (a grandson of James Butler, 13th/23rd Baron Dunboyne).

He died at the age of 91. As he died without male issue, he was succeeded in the baronetcy by his younger brother, Francis.

Parliament of the United Kingdom
Preceded by Charles Schreiber	Member of Parliament for Cheltenham; 1868 – 1874	Succeeded by James Agg-Gardner
Preceded by Henry Lopes	Member of Parliament for Frome; 1876 –1885	Succeeded by Lawrence James Baker
Baronetage of the United Kingdom
Preceded by Bernhard Samuelson	Baronet (of Bodicote); 1905–1937	Succeeded by Francis Samuelson
