= 1918 Banbury by-election =

UK parliamentary by-election

The Banbury by-election, 1918 was a parliamentary by-election held for the British House of Commons constituency of Banbury, sometimes also referred to as North Oxfordshire,' on 24 September 1918. The seat had become vacant upon the appointment of the sitting Liberal MP, Sir Eustace Fiennes, to become Governor of the Seychelles.

The Liberal candidate, Colonel Rhys Williams, had been adopted by Banbury Liberal Association in preference to their previously selected candidate. It was reported he would stand as an Independent Liberal while still supporting the then Coalition government of prime minister David Lloyd George. Williams was returned unopposed.

== See also ==
- List of United Kingdom by-elections (1900–1918)
- 1922 Banbury by-election
