= Robert Bingham Brassey =

British politician (1875–1946)

Captain Robert Bingham Brassey (18 October 1875 – 14 November 1946) was a British Conservative Party politician.

He was the son of Albert Brassey, MP.

He was elected as Member of Parliament (MP) for Banbury in the general election of January 1910, winning it from the Liberals, but they took it back from him in the general election of December 1910.

In 1911 he bought Cottesbrooke Hall from the Langham family. It was sold in 1937 to the Macdonald-Buchanans.

Parliament of the United Kingdom
Preceded by Eustace Fiennes	Member of Parliament for Banbury; Jan 1910 – Dec 1910	Succeeded by Eustace Fiennes
