= Neil Marten =

British politician (1916–1985)

Sir Harry Neil Marten PC (3 December 1916 – 22 December 1985) was a British Conservative Party politician.

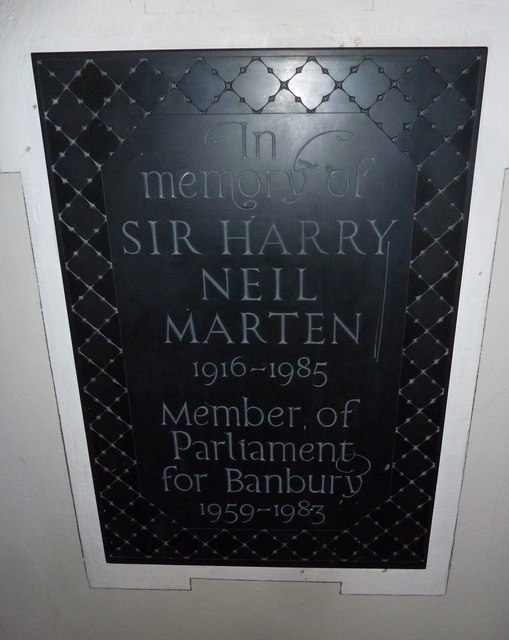
Memorial to Neil Marten in Banbury parish church.

Born in Lambeth, Marten was educated at Rossall School. During World War II he was parachuted into France as part of Operation Jedburgh to work with the French resistance and later served with the Norwegian resistance. He worked in the Foreign Office from 1947 to 1957 and was a solicitor and shipping advisor.

Marten was Member of Parliament for Banbury from 1959 to 1983 and served as a junior aviation minister 1962–64 and Overseas Development minister under Margaret Thatcher. Marten was a leading opponent of the European Economic Community. At the end of his time in Parliament, he was knighted on 6 January 1983. He died in Dorset aged 69.

He was a director of the private shipping and aircraft company Davies and Newman and was in office when it was floated on the London Stock Exchange in 1971 and had been associated with the company since 1962.

A keen raconteur, Marten told a story of a tour he took around the Palace of Westminster with his Banbury constituents. Touring through the maze of corridors they turned a corner and met Lord Hailsham, the Lord Chancellor, wearing the full regalia of his office. Recognising his Parliamentary colleague in the midst of the Banbury constituents, Hailsham boomed, "Neil". Not needing to be told again, the tour party fell to its knees with some haste.

Marten was appointed a privy counsellor in the 1981 Birthday Honours.

== Sources ==
- Times Guide to the House of Commons, 1966 & 1979
- Leigh Rayment's Historical List of MPs

Parliament of the United Kingdom
Preceded by Douglas Dodds-Parker	Member of Parliament for Banbury; 1959–1983	Succeeded by Tony Baldry
Political offices
Preceded by Judith Hart	Minister for Overseas Development; 1979–1983	Succeeded by Timothy Raison
