= Bernhard Samuelson =

Jewish industrialist, philanthropist, educationalist and politician

Sir Bernhard Samuelson, Bt PC, FRS
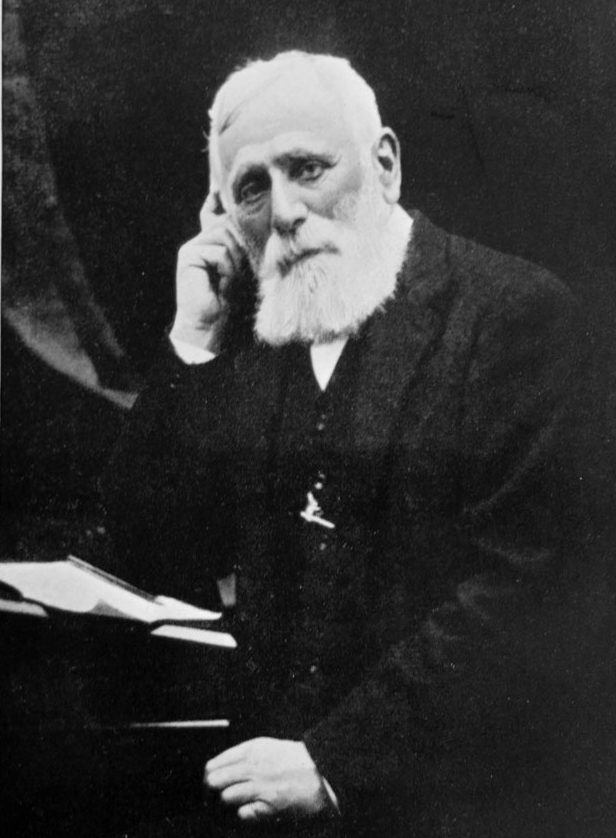
- Sir Bernhard Samuelson

Member of Parliament for Banbury
- In office February 1859-April 1859; 1865-1895

Personal details
- Born: 22 November 1820 Hamburg, Germany
- Died: 10 May 1905 (aged 84) London, England
- Party: Liberal
- Spouse(s): Caroline Blundell (m. 1844); Lelia Serena (d. 1915)
- Children: 8, including Henry and Francis

Sir Bernhard Samuelson, 1st Baronet, PC, FRS (22 November 1820 – 10 May 1905) was an industrialist, educationalist and a Liberal politician who sat in the House of Commons in 1859 and from 1865 to 1895.

== Early life ==
Samuelson was born in Hamburg, the eldest son of Samuel Hermann Samuelson and his wife Sarah Hertz. His father, who became a merchant in Liverpool, was born in Petersburg, Virginia, and his grandfather Hyman Samuels, was born in London in 1764. Samuelson was educated at the Rev. J Blezard's school at Skirlaugh, Yorkshire near Hull. He started work in his father's office at the age of 14 and was then apprenticed to a Swiss firm in Liverpool. He was exporting engineering machinery and became manager for a Manchester firm of Sharp, Stewart & Co.

Samuelson bought a small factory in Banbury that was manufacturing agricultural equipment in 1848. Samuel son erected blast-furnaces at South Bank, near Middlesbrough, within a mile of the works of Bolckow & Vaughan at Eston. These he operated until 1863, when they were sold, and he erected bigger premises in the neighbourhood of Newport, South Wales.

== Political career ==
In February 1859, after a by-election caused by the resignation of Henry William Tancred, Samuelson was elected as Member of Parliament for Banbury until displaced at the 1859 general election. In 1865 he was elected for Banbury again, but his defeated opponent Charles Bell petitioned against his return on the grounds that he was an alien. Samuelson was able to demonstrate that as his grandfather was born in England he was eligible under the British Nationality Act of 1772. He held the seat until 1895. His interests in Parliament were industrial and technical issues. He chaired committees on scientific instruction, railways and patents and was a member of the Royal Commission for the Paris Exhibition in 1878. Meanwhile, his industrial activities had grown significantly. By 1872, his Banbury works were producing over 8000 reaping machines and the production of iron, tar and other products from his ironworks had also grown.

== Professional career ==
Samuelson was a member of the Institution of Civil Engineers and a member of the Institute of Mechanical Engineers. A paper on the construction of blast furnaces won him a Telford Medal in 1871. He was made a Fellow of the Royal Society in 1881.

He was adjudged a considerate employer and developed the institutions of Middlesbrough and Cleveland. He was a firm believer in technical education and presented a technical institute to Banbury in 1884. He received a Baronetcy in the same year for services to education. He was made a privy counsellor in the 1895 Resignation Honours.

== Personal life ==
Samuelson had married Caroline Blundell, daughter of Henry Blundell at Hull in 1844. They had eight children. Their eldest son Henry, who succeeded to the baronetcy, was also an MP. The baronetcy later passed to their second son, Francis. Their third and youngest son, Herbert, was made a KBE in his own right.

Samuelson was painted by Eduardo Gelli of Florence. A bronze portrait bust by Cesare Fantachiotti of Florence, of which there were terra-cotta replicas, belonged to the second son, Francis Samuelson and is now in an American private collection. Sir Bemhard's eldest son added to the Queen Victoria Memorial Hospital at Mont Boron, Nice, the 'Sir Bernhard Samuelson memorial annexe' for infectious cases, with twenty beds ; a replica of Fantachiotti's bust is on the façade. An addition was also made in Sir Bernhard's memory to the Middlesbrough infirmary. A memorial painted window was placed in Over Compton church, Sherborne, Dorset, by Sir Bernhard's eldest daughter, Caroline, wife of Colonel John Bernhard Harbin Goodden.

After Caroline's death, Bernhard married Lelia Mathilda, daughter of Chevalier Leon Serena and the widow of William Denny of Dumbarton. A volunteer nurse with the Voluntary Aid Detachments, she died of an illness contracted on duty on 18 June 1915.

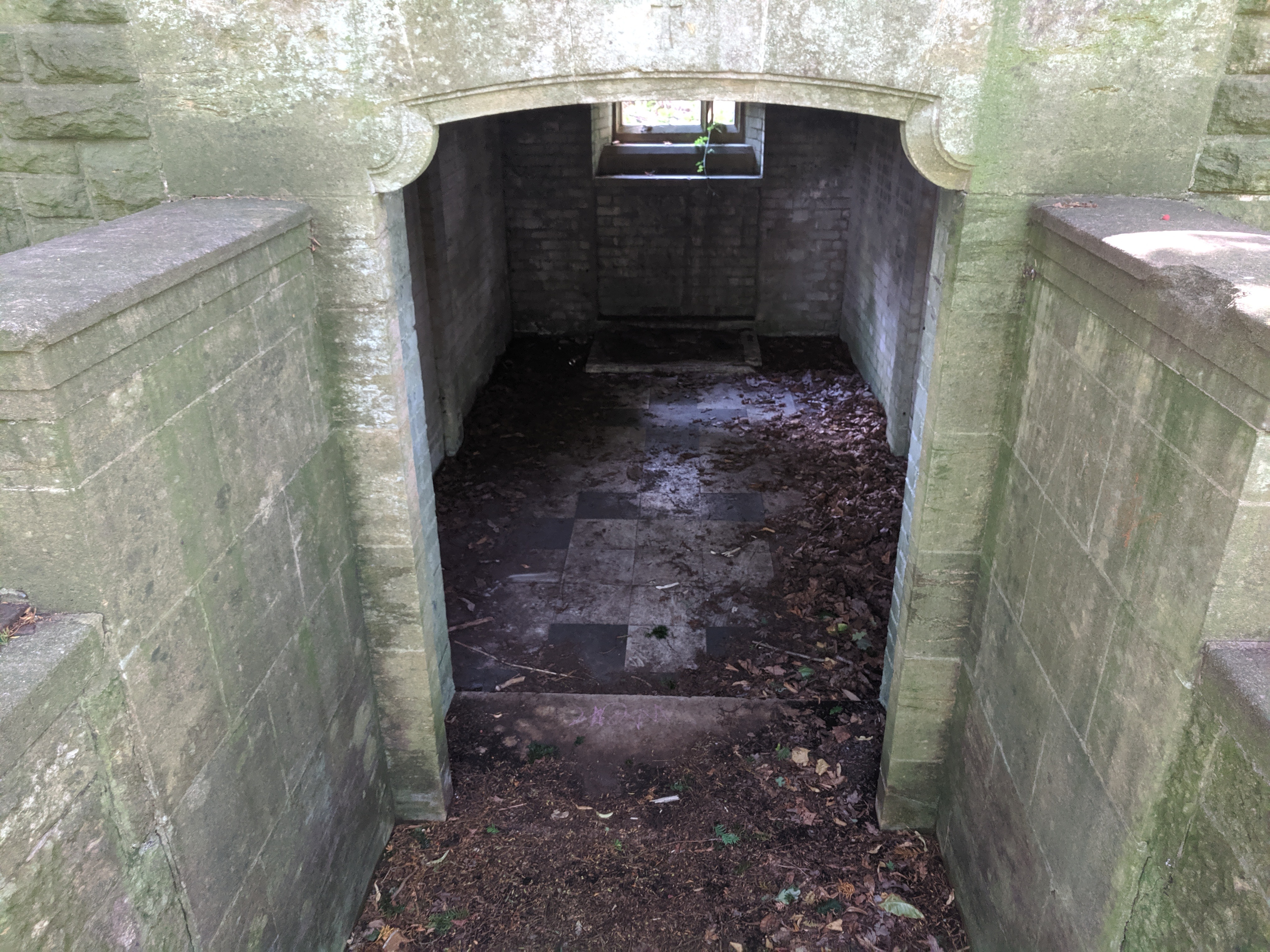
Inside Samuelson's mausoleum

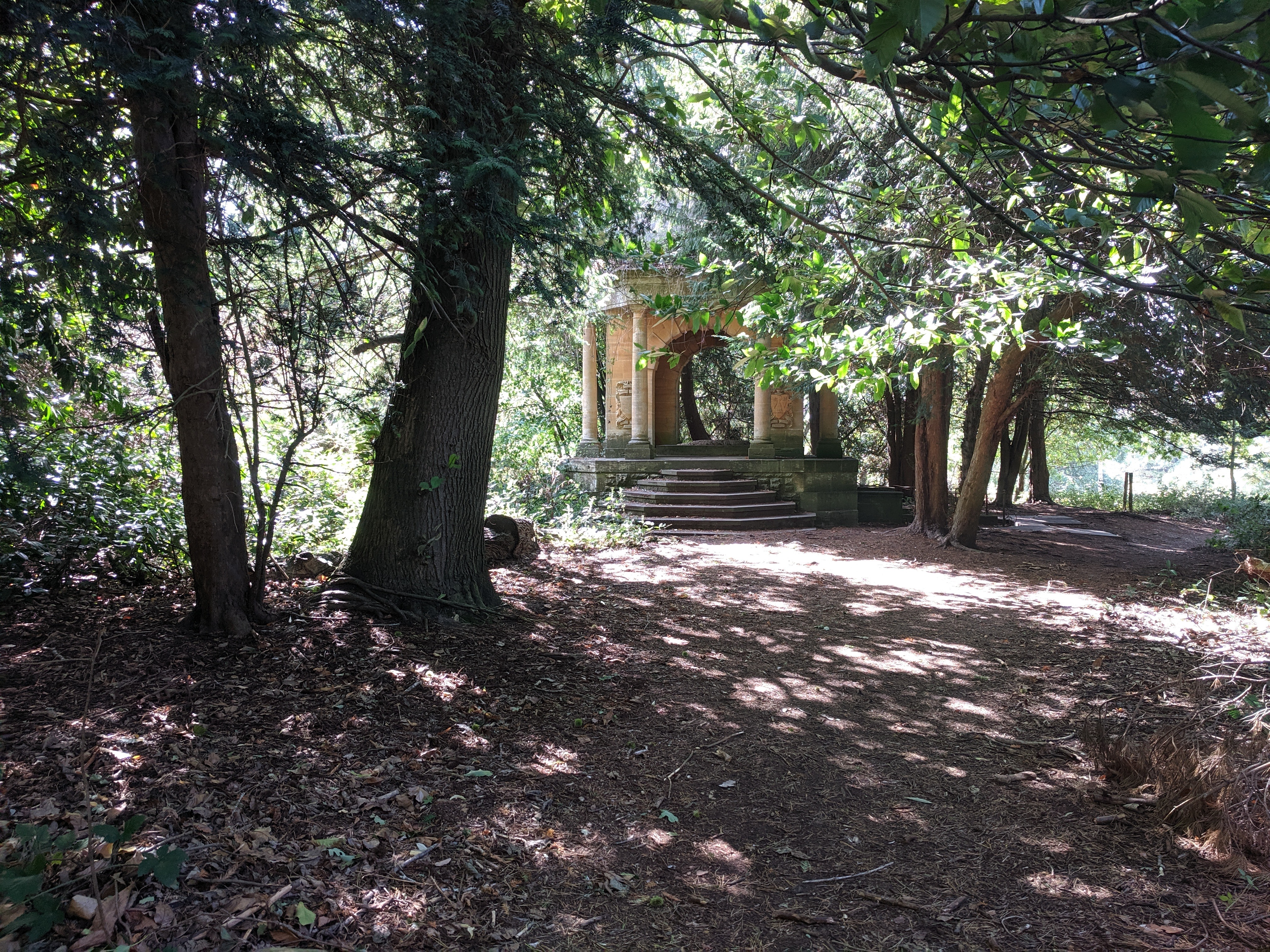
Exterior of Samuelson's mausoleum

Samuelson died in London in 1905 at the age of 84 and was buried in Torquay.

A stone memorial and tomb to Bernhard Samuelson was erected by his eldest son: it lies hidden and overgrown in Hatchford Wood, close to Ockham, Surrey, and bears the motto of the second baronet. According to the inscription, this "Temple of Sleep" contains the last mortal remains of Bernhard Samuelson, his wife and a daughter. The mausoleum is now empty (August 2020) and various sculpture work appears to have been removed.

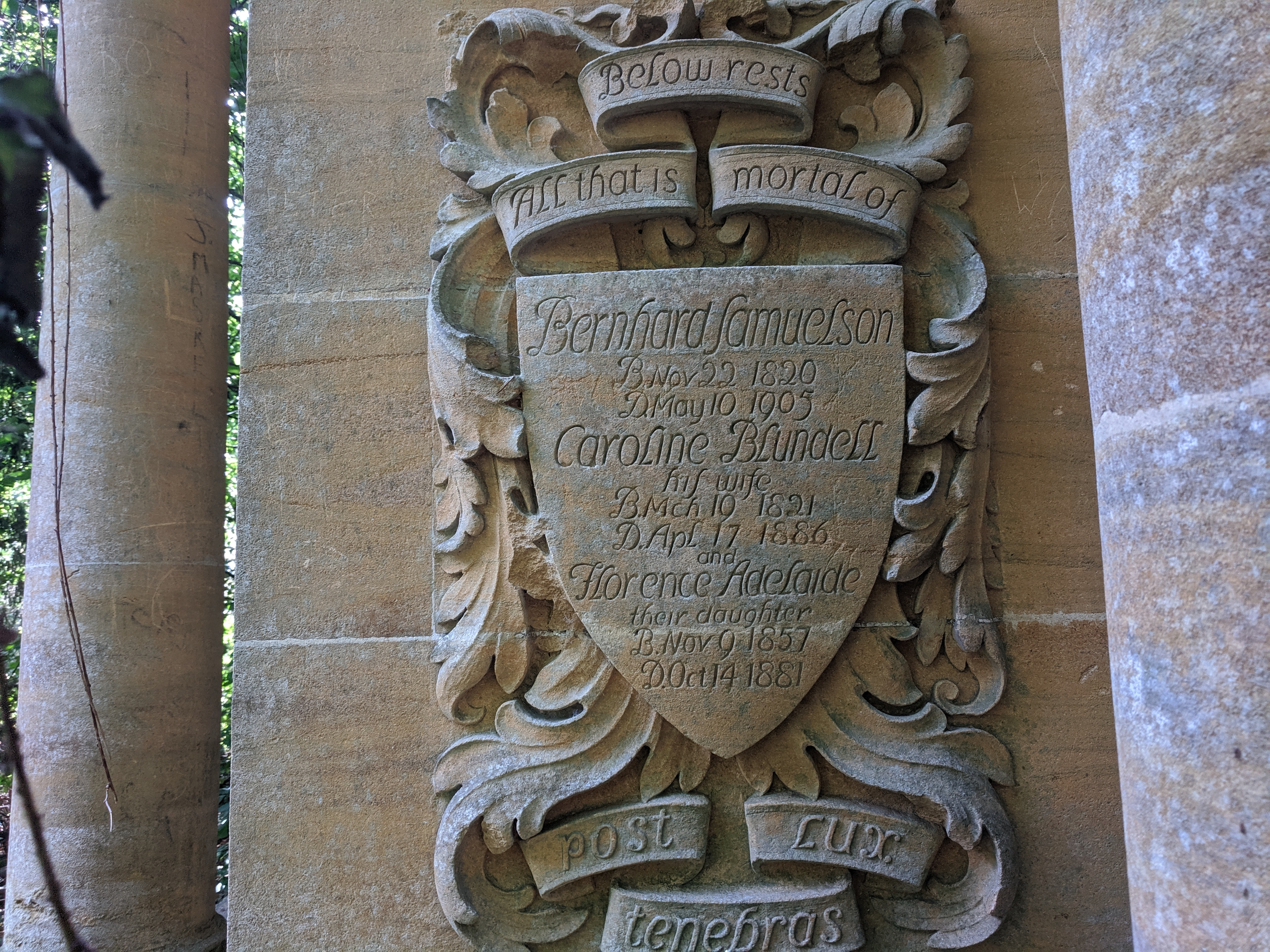
Inscription on Samuelson's mausoleum

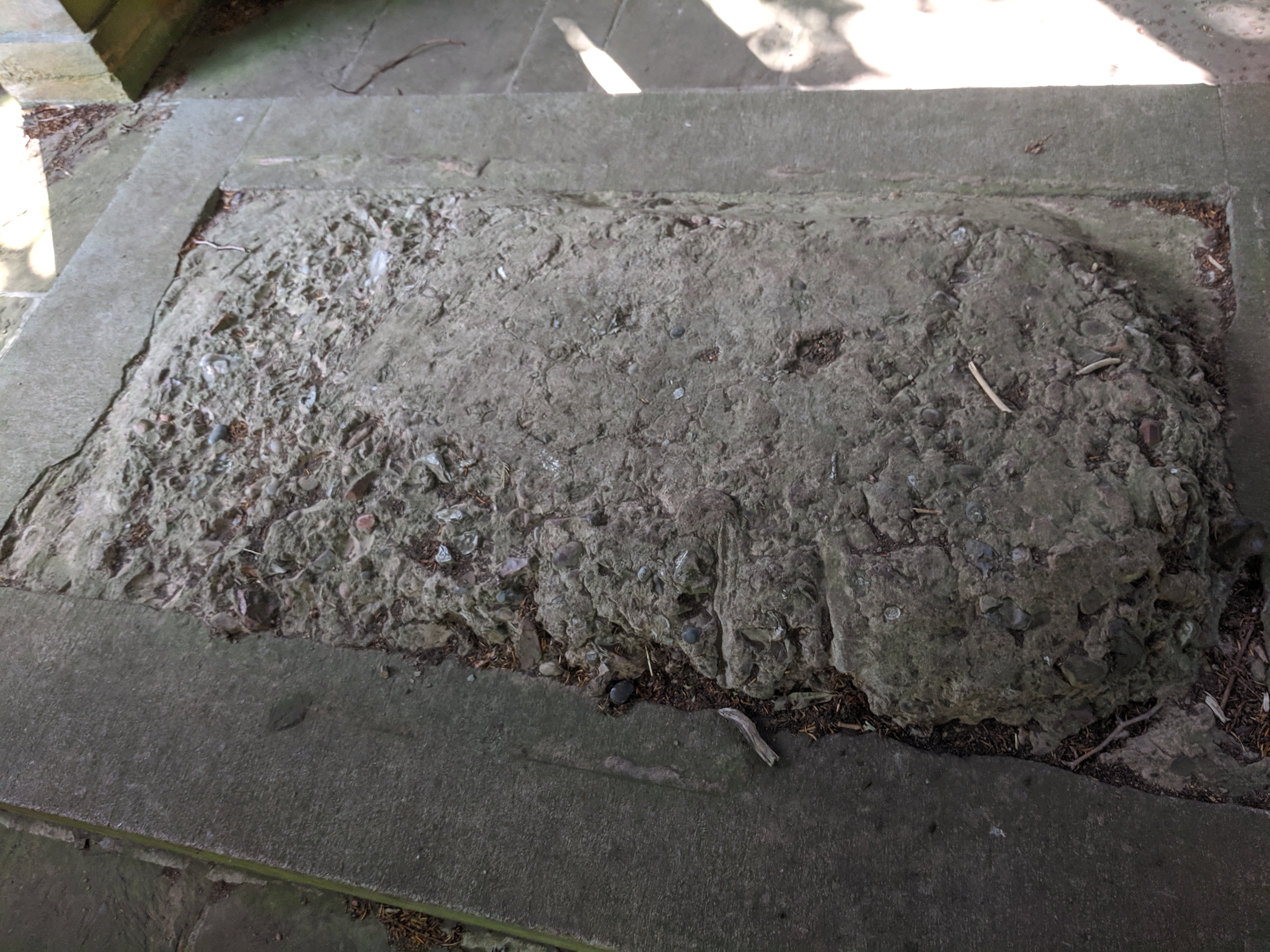
Remains of removed sculpture in Samuelson's mausoleum

Parliament of the United Kingdom
Preceded by Henry William Tancred	Member of Parliament for Banbury; February 1859 – April 1859	Succeeded by Sir Charles Eurwicke Douglas
Preceded by Sir Charles Eurwicke Douglas	Member of Parliament for Banbury; 1865–1895	Succeeded by Albert Brassey
Baronetage of the United Kingdom
New creation	Baronet (of Bodicote); 1884–1905	Succeeded by Henry Samuelson
