= Eustace Fiennes =

British soldier, politician, colonial administrator and sportsman

Eustace Fiennes

Sir Eustace Edward Twisleton-Wykeham-Fiennes, 1st Baronet (29 February 1864 – 9 February 1943), known as Sir Eustace Fiennes, (Note: This British person has the barrelled surname Twisleton-Wykeham-Fiennes, but is known by the surname Fiennes.) was a British soldier, Liberal politician, colonial administrator and sportsman.

== Background ==
Fiennes was born in Reading, Berkshire, the second son of John Twisleton-Wykeham-Fiennes, 17th Baron Saye and Sele and his wife, Lady Augusta Hay-Drummond, a daughter of the 11th Earl of Kinnoull. He was educated at Malvern College.

In 1894, Fiennes married Florence Agnes Fletcher née Rathfelder (from Constantia, Cape Town). They lived in Windlesham and Sunningdale and had two children: John Eustace (1895–1917, Battle of Arras) and Sir Ranulph Twisleton-Wykeham-Fiennes, 2nd Baronet (1902–1943).

== Military career ==
Fiennes fought in the North-West Rebellion in 1885, was stationed in Egypt from 1888 to 1889, and took part in the expedition to Mashonaland in 1890. He was commissioned into the Queen's Own Oxfordshire Hussars in 1895, and promoted lieutenant on 29 April 1899. Following the outbreak of the Second Boer War in late 1899, Fiennes volunteered for service in South Africa, and was commissioned as a lieutenant in the Imperial Yeomanry on 3 February 1900, serving in the 40th (Oxfordshire) company of the 10th Battalion. He left London the same day on board the SS Montfort. He was promoted captain in 1901, major in 1905, and lieutenant-colonel in 1918. He fought in Flanders and the Dardanelles during World War I.

== Political career ==
At the 1906 general election, Fiennes was elected as Member of Parliament (MP) for Banbury and with a brief interruption in 1910, held the seat until the 1918 general election. He was also Parliamentary Private Secretary to Winston Churchill (then First Lord of the Admiralty) from 1912 to 1914. Created a baronet in 1916, Fiennes left the Commons two years later to become Governor of the Seychelles and was then Governor of the Leeward Islands from 1921 to 1929.

Fiennes died in 1943 aged 78 and his title was inherited by his son who died the same year. His grandson, the famous explorer Sir Ranulph Fiennes, inherited the title on his birth in 1944. Through his grandfather the 16th Baron Saye and Sele, Fiennes is also related to the actors Ralph and Joseph Fiennes.

== Sportsman ==
Eustace was also notable amateur lawn tennis player he competed at events in the mid 1880s. He played at the Cirencester Park Lawn Tennis Tournament in 1882 and 1883 where he was a losing quarter finalist to Charles Lacy Sweet. He won one singles title at the Swanage LTC Tournament in Swanage, Dorset in 1883.

== Notes ==
Parliament of the United Kingdom
Preceded by Albert Brassey	Member of Parliament for Banbury; 1906 – January 1910	Succeeded by Robert Brassey
Preceded by Robert Brassey	Member of Parliament for Banbury; December 1910 – 1918	Succeeded by Rhys Williams
Government offices
Preceded by Charles O'Brien	Governor of the Seychelles; 1918–1921	Succeeded by Sir Joseph Byrne
Preceded by Sir Edward Merewether	Governor of the Leeward Islands; 1921–1929	Succeeded by Sir Thomas St. Johnston
Baronetage of the United Kingdom
New creation	Baronet (of Banbury); 1916–1943	Succeeded by Ranulph Twisleton-Wykeham-Fiennes
