= Bursar =

Professional financial administrator in a school or university

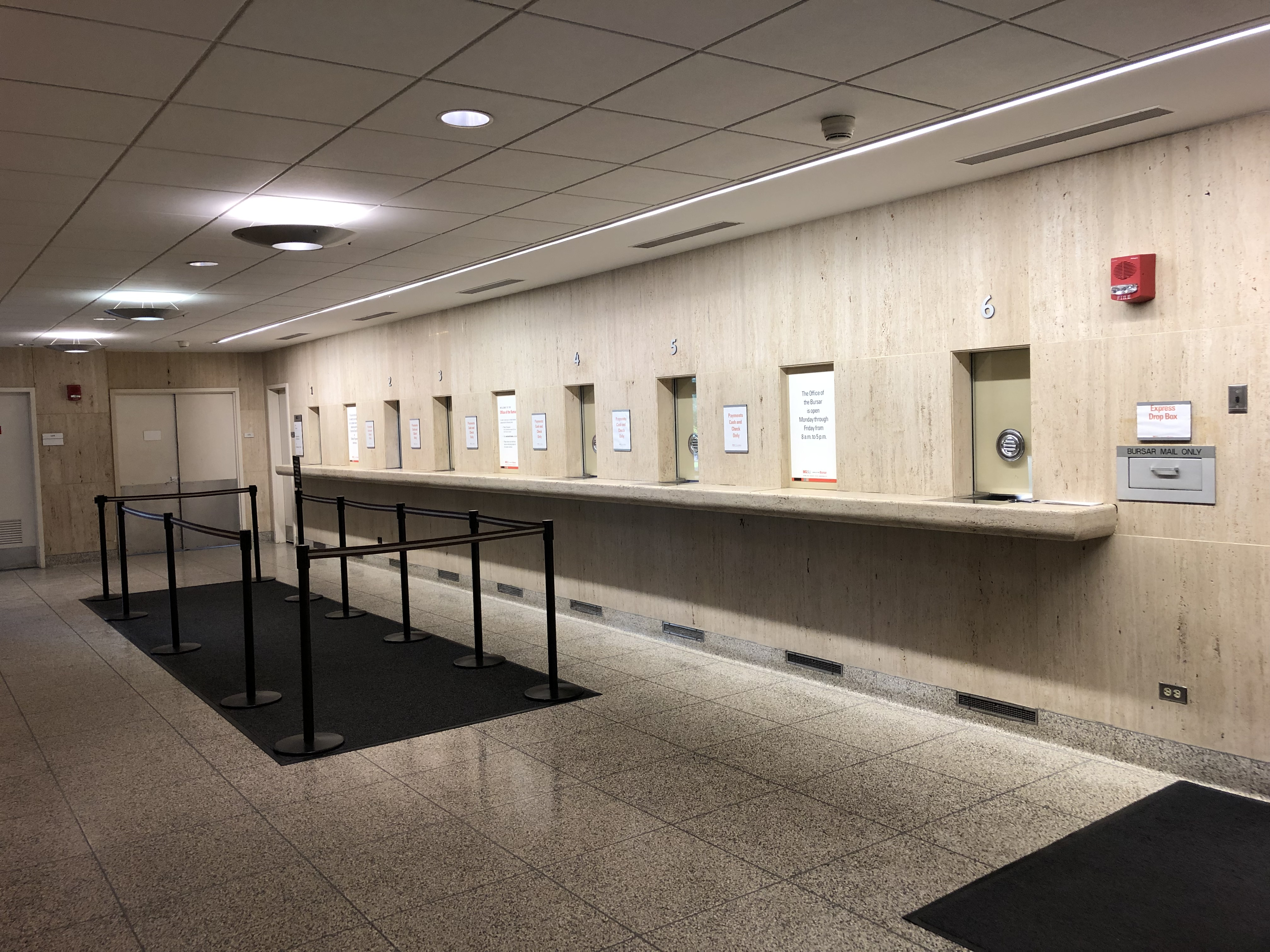
Office of the Bursar at Bowling Green State University

A bursar (derived from bursa, Latin for 'purse') is a professional administrator in a school or university often with a predominantly financial role. In the United States, bursars usually hold office only at the level of higher education (two-year and four-year colleges and universities) or at private secondary schools. In Australia, the United Kingdom and other countries, bursars are common at other levels of education.

== Duties ==
The bursar is responsible for billing of student tuition accounts. This responsibility involves sending bills and making payment plans; the ultimate goal is to bring all student accounts to a "paid off" status. Bursars are not necessarily involved in the financial aid process.

Bursars' duties vary from one institution to another. At many institutions, bursars deal only with student finances. At other institutions, bursars also deal with some faculty finance issues. Elsewhere, they also oversee accounts receivable, or the payments that the university receives from outside organizations for which it performs services. In some institutions, all money held by the institution is the bursar's responsibility. Some bursars (in the UK for instance) also have responsibility for payroll, investments, facilities, IT, human resources, health and safety and oversight of administrative functions at an institution.

The bursar statement is also known as a tuition bill or a student account bill.

The bursar often reports to a comptroller. For example, Barnard College employs an Associate Comptroller–Bursar. In other cases, the bursar has the same level as the comptroller, and both report to the director or vice president of finance. Some universities in the United States still have a director of student financial services whose role is similar to that of a bursar. The University of Pennsylvania employs an associate vice president who essentially combines the role of a bursar (using the student financial services title) and that of a registrar.

== Notable bursars ==
- Andrew Munro (1869–1935), bursar Queens' College, Cambridge
- Sir John Bradfield (1925–2014), senior bursar of Trinity College, Cambridge (1956–92)
- John Maynard Keynes (1883–1946), first bursar of King's College, Cambridge (1924–44)
- The Rev. Prof. Norman Walker Porteous (1898–2003), first bursar of University of Edinburgh (1916)
- Derek Taunt (1917–2004), Jesus College, Cambridge
- Billy Liddell (1922–2001), former footballer and bursar of Liverpool University (1961–84)
- Cecil Goodden (1879–1969), Harrow School

=== Fictional ===
Professor Dinwiddie is "The Bursar" of the Unseen University in Terry Pratchett's Discworld novels. He is driven insane by the Archchancellor and so madness is known there as "going Bursar".

== See also ==
- Chief financial officer
- Purser, etymologically cognate military (especially naval) position
- School business manager
- Treasurer
