= Cecil Goodden =

Personal information
- Full name: Cecil Phelips Goodden
- Born: 12 November 1879; Over Compton, Dorset, England
- Died: 5 November 1969 (aged 89); Sedgehill, Wiltshire, England
- Batting: Right-handed
- Bowling: Right-arm fast-medium

Domestic team information
- Years: Team
- 1903–1922: Dorset
- 1900–1903: Marylebone Cricket Club

Career statistics
Competition	First-class
Matches	3
Runs scored	27
Batting average	5.40
100s/50s	–/–
Top score	9
Balls bowled	24
Wickets	–
Bowling average	–
5 wickets in innings	–
10 wickets in match	–
Best bowling	–
Catches/stumpings	1/–
- Source: Cricinfo, 1 June 2011

Cecil Phelips Goodden (12 November 1879 – 5 November 1969) was an English cricketer, writer and British Army and Royal Marines officer. Goodden was a right-handed batsman. The son of John Robert Phelips Goodden, who would later become High Sheriff of Dorset, and Caroline Samuelson, he was born in Compton House, the family home of the Goodden family, in the village of Over Compton, Dorset. He was later educated at Harrow School, where he played for the school cricket team in 1899.

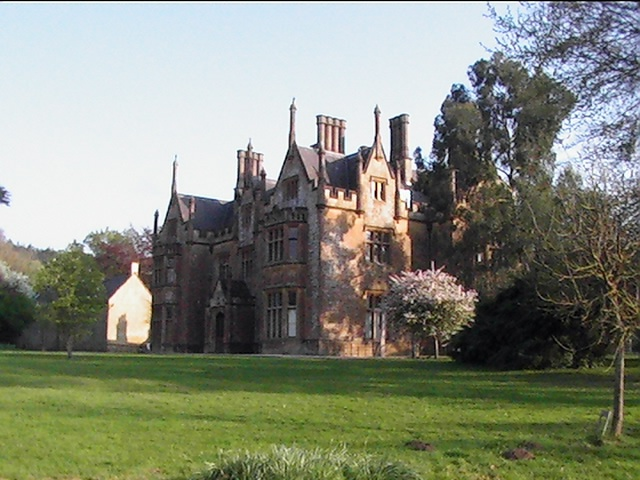
Compton House, Goodden's place of birth, formerly the Goodden family home

Goodden made his first-class debut for the Marylebone Cricket Club in 1900 against London County. He played 2 further first-class matches, both against the same opposition in 1901 and 1903. Goodden scored 27 runs at an average of 5.40 in these matches. With the ball, he bowled a total of 4 overs, without taking a wicket. Goodden made his debut for Dorset in the 1903 Minor Counties Championship against Devon. He played Minor counties cricket infrequently for Dorset from 1903 to 1922, making 57 appearances.

Goodden wrote a number of books during his life, including The story of the Sherborne Pageant. He married Hylda Woulfe in London on 2 December 1911, with the couple having four daughters and one son. Goodden later served in the First World War. The London Gazette mentions him in October 1914 as having been given the rank of 2nd Lieutenant in the Queen's Own Dorset Yeomanry. During the course of the war, Goodden moved to the Royal Marines. He was once more mentioned in dispatches in December 1916, this time holding the rank of Temporary Lieutenant, with the nature of the mention being to inform readers of his promotion to Temporary Captain. Following the war, he became the bursar at Harrow School. Goodden died on 5 November 1969 in Sedgehill, Wiltshire.
