= Sir Francis Samuelson, 4th Baronet =

Racing driver and aristocrat (1890–1981)

Sir Francis Samuleson
- Born: Francis Henry Bernard Samuelson; 22 February 1890 Darlington, England
- Died: 8 January 1981 (aged 90) Herstmonceux, England

Sir Francis Henry Bernard Samuelson, 4th Baronet was an English baronet and amateur racing driver.

== Motor racing career ==
Samuelson started driving as a schoolboy in a 6hp Rover, bought for him by his father, in order to tease him away from motorcycles. While at the University of Cambridge, he took part in Varsity car trials, and started racing at Brooklands. In 1913, on his honeymoon in France, he entered the Cyclecar Grand Prix at Amiens in a Marlborough, especially lightened to make the 8 cwt weight limit; after his scheduled riding mechanic failed to show up, Margaret Samuelson gamely volunteered to fill the role, holding a fuel can as ballast. The pair retired after 110 of the 165 miles.

After the First World War, in which he served on the Western Front with the Yorkshire Yeomanry, the family business - the Middlesbrough-based ironworks company Sir B. Samuelson & Co - was sold, and Samuelson moved to Staplefield Farm near Steyning, where he lived until 1965, when he moved to Partridge Green. He raced numerous different cars at Brooklands, including his own self-built F.S. Special. He made his 24 Hours of Le Mans debut in 1925, although the Austin 7 he was due to share with Eric Gordon England retired before he got to drive. He took part in the Monte Carlo Rally from 1927 to 1933, with his wife as co-driver on his first entry, and won his class in 1928, in a 2 litre Lagonda tourer.

His best appearance at Le Mans came in 1931, in which he and Freddy Kindell should have finished 3rd on the Index of Performance and 7th overall in his MG C-type, but due to a misunderstanding of the regulations, he finished the final lap too slowly, due to a breaking rod, and was disqualified. He did however finish 5th in the "Class II" section of the 1931 German Grand Prix in the same car. His only classified finish in a 24 hour race had come at the 24 Hours of Spa the previous year, sharing an MG M-type with Kindell to 16th place, and 5th in class.

Samuelson - by now Sir Francis - took up motor racing once more in 1946, in the new 500cc Formula, thus becoming the only driver known to have raced before the First World War and after the Second. Originally he used a car of his own design and built by the Marwyn company, but soon discarded it for a Cooper Mark II, in which he finished 3rd at the biggest race of the year, the 1948 British Grand Prix support race - a place ahead of Cooper founder Eric Brandon. He raced in the new Formula 3 until 1951, and competed on and off in VSCC meetings until 1970. He was a regular driver until past his 87th birthday, but was disqualified from driving in 1977, after going through a red light with a dachshund on his lap, and failing eyesight prevented him from regaining his licence.

== Personal life ==
Samuelson was educated at Eton College and Trinity College, Cambridge. He married Margaret Kendall Barnes, daughter of H. Kendall Barnes, in 1913, and ascended to the Samuelson baronetcy on the death of his father in 1946; he was in turn succeeded by his son Bernard in 1981. He was for a time Joint Master of the Storrington Beagles, and after his move in 1965 was Master of the Brighton Beagles.

=== Le Mans results ===
Year	Team	Co-Drivers	Car	Class	Laps	Pos.	Class Pos.
1925	(United Kingdom) Eric Gordon England	(United Kingdom) Eric Gordon England	Austin Seven	<750cc	9	ret	ret
1928	(United Kingdom) F. E. Metcalfe	(United Kingdom) Frank King	Lagonda OH 2L	2.0	13	ret	ret
1930	(United Kingdom) Samuelson	(United Kingdom) Freddie Kindell	MG Midget	1.1	28	ret	ret
1931	(United Kingdom) Samuelson	(United Kingdom) Freddie Kindell	MG Midget	<1.0	109	n/c	n/c
1932	(United Kingdom) Samuelson	(United Kingdom) Norman Black	MG Midget	<750cc	57	ret	ret

Baronetage of the United Kingdom
Preceded by Sir Francis Samuelson, 3rd Baronet	Baronet (of Bodicote); 1946–1981	Succeeded by Sir Michael Francis Samuelson, 5th Baronet
