= Tony Baldry =

British Conservative politician (born 1950)

The Right Honourable Sir Tony Baldry TD DL
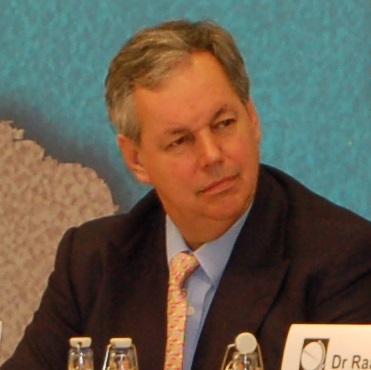
- Baldry in 2010

Second Church Estates Commissioner
- In office 21 June 2010 – 30 March 2015
- Prime Minister: David Cameron
- Preceded by: Stuart Bell
- Succeeded by: Caroline Spelman

Chair of the International Development Select Committee
- In office 18 July 2001 – 14 July 2005
- Preceded by: Bowen Wells
- Succeeded by: Malcolm Bruce

Minister of State for Agriculture, Fisheries and Food
- In office 5 July 1995 – 1 May 1997
- Prime Minister: John Major
- Preceded by: Michael Jack
- Succeeded by: Jeff Rooker

Member of Parliament for Banbury
- In office 9 June 1983 – 30 March 2015
- Preceded by: Neil Marten
- Succeeded by: Victoria Prentis

Personal details
- Born: 10 July 1950 (age 76) Uxbridge, Middlesex, England
- Party: Conservative
- Spouse(s): Pippa, Lady Baldry
- Children: 2
- Education: University of Sussex; Inns of Court
- Website: Official website

Military service
- Allegiance: United Kingdom
- Branch/service: Sussex Yeomanry
- Years of service: 1971–1991
- Rank: acting major

Sir Antony Brian Baldry, TD, DL (born 10 July 1950) is a British Conservative Party politician who was the Member of Parliament (MP) for Banbury from 1983 to 2015.

== Early life ==
Born in 1950, Baldry was educated at Leighton Park School, a Quaker school, and the University of Sussex where he read law. During his university years, Baldry was actively involved in student politics and, whilst attending Sussex, took the Students' Union to the High Court on the grounds that the Students' Union was making ultra vires payments out of Student Union funds to various political organisations. The case of Baldry v Feintuck is notable in legal history for defining the legal status of students' unions for the first time.

In 1975, Baldry was called to the Bar at Lincoln's Inn and became a common lawyer, joining the Oxford and Midlands Circuit.

== Military service ==
In 1971, whilst at university, Baldry joined the Sussex Yeomanry. On 19 May 1974, he was commissioned into the Royal Artillery, Territorial Army (TA), as a second lieutenant (on probation). He was given the service number 498590. His commission and rank were confirmed on 19 May 1974. He was promoted to lieutenant on 19 May 1976, and to captain on 18 February 1981.

He retired from the TA on 1 April 1990 with the rank of acting major.

== Political career ==
Baldry began his political career in the February 1974 general election, serving as personal assistant to Maurice Macmillan, then Chief Secretary to the Treasury and in the October 1974 general election, he was personal assistant to Margaret Thatcher. When Thatcher later became Leader of the Conservative Party in 1975, Baldry joined her Private Office, working as the link between Thatcher and the "Britain in Europe Campaign" and the "Yes" Campaign, for the 1975 EU referendum. Baldry was active in the European movement and won the Robert Schumann Silver Medal in 1978 for contributions to Europe.

Baldry was first selected as a parliamentary candidate for the Thurrock constituency for the 1979 general election where he secured one of the largest swings to the Conservative Party, reducing a 19,000 Labour majority at the last general election to 6,400.

Following the retirement of veteran Banbury Conservative MP Neil Marten, Baldry successfully contested the seat at the 1983 general election and was elected to Parliament with a majority of 13,025.

From 1985 to 1990, Baldry was a Parliamentary Private Secretary, successively to Lynda Chalker and John Wakeham, who was leader of the House of Commons. In January 1990 Margaret Thatcher made Baldry a Parliamentary Under-Secretary of State in the Department of Energy, where he helped John Wakeham privatise the electricity industry. Baldry was one of the last of those made a Minister by Margaret Thatcher still to be in the House of Commons.

Following the election of John Major as prime minister in November 1990, Michael Heseltine asked that Baldry move to the Department for the Environment, where he stayed for four years covering every aspect of the department's work including housing, planning, Local Government and construction.

In 1994 Baldry moved to the Foreign and Commonwealth Office to cover in the House of Commons for Lynda Chalker who was the Minister for Overseas Development but in the House of Lords. As a consequence, he spoke for the Government on International Development in the House of Commons.

In 1995 he was promoted to the rank of Minister of State at the Ministry of Agriculture, Fisheries and Food – where he had to grapple with the twin problems of BSE and increasingly unpopular EU fisheries policies – a position he held until the fall of the Major government in 1997. His civil servants nicknamed him 'Baldrick'.

On 21 June 2010, Baldry was appointed Second Church Estates Commissioner, with responsibility for answering questions in the House in a manner similar to questions to ministers on the work of the Church Commissioners.

In the 2010 general election Baldry was re-elected with an increased majority, of 18,227 votes.

Following the 2010 general election, he became co-chair of the APPG on Agriculture and Food for Development along with Lord Cameron of Dillington, and joined the Ecclesiastical Select Committee.

Baldry announced his decision to stand down as an MP at the May 2015 general election on 1 September 2014.

Following his retirement from the House of Commons in 2015 he was appointed as the chair of the Church Buildings Council succeeding Anne Sloman. He stepped down on 11 July 2019 and was replaced by the vice chair Jennie Page

== International development ==
Tony Baldry is a member of the Council of the Overseas Development Institute, was vice-chair of the All-Party Parliamentary Group on Overseas Development (Apgood), a Trustee of Friends of Africa, which is a UK-based charity, and a Trustee of Afghan Action, a UK-based charity working in Afghanistan. He was one of eleven MPs to volunteer for the VSO's project PolVol in 2008. He is on the council of governors of Chatham House.

From 2001 to 2005, Baldry chaired the House of Commons Select Committee on International Development. Since the summer of 2009, Baldry had chaired the Conservative Party's Commission on Human Rights.

== Controversy ==
=== Personal loan ===
In January 1997, Baldry accepted from Sarosh Zaiwalla (a prominent London solicitor), a £5,000 personal loan, on which he paid interest. Baldry gave Lord Feldman (Chairman of the Conservative Party in London at the time) a letter of support for a recommendation of a public honour that Lord Feldman was making on behalf of Sarosh Zaiwalla. It was later held by the Parliamentary Commissioner for Standards that in that reference or separately, Baldry should have declared that he was at the time a beneficiary of a loan from Sarosh Zaiwalla. Baldry was consequently ordered to apologise to the House over the incident.

=== Sierra Leone ===
In January 2005 Baldry wrote to Hilary Benn, Secretary for International Development, on behalf of Milestone Trading, a British company involved in diamond mining in Sierra Leone. He asked Benn whether his department could endorse the company as conforming to "best practices" in the diamond industry. In his letter to Benn, which was written on House of Commons notepaper, he did not reveal that Milestone had paid $75,000 into a company in which he was a one-third shareholder.

Benn replied that the government "could not endorse an individual company's activities". At the time Baldry was the chairman of the House of Commons International Development Committee. He had also written letters to the president and vice-president of Sierra Leone on behalf of Milestone in late 2004.

Baldry also sent a series of letters on Angelgate Aviation notepaper from St James's Square (seen by the Parliamentary Commissioner for Standards) to Sierra Leone Vice President Solomon Berewa on behalf of Angel Gate Aviation, a company that was trying to set up flights between London and Freetown.

In investigating this case, the Parliamentary Commissioner for Standards concluded that Baldry should not have used House of Commons notepaper in the letter to Benn. Baldry consequently made an apology to the House for the use of House stationery; however, the Commissioner stated that he found no indication whatsoever, in the course of his inquiry, that Mr Baldry had sought to exploit his position as Chairman of the International Development Committee to further his private interests. The parliamentary Standards and Privileges Committee observed that "Baldry did not comply with the House's requirements in respect of the declarations of interests."

=== James Ibori ===
In September 2009 Baldry, in his capacity as a barrister instructed by the solicitor Sarosh Zaiwalla, wrote a letter to Foreign Secretary David Miliband on behalf of Nigerian state governor James Ibori, who was under investigation by Scotland Yard for corruption. The Oxford Mail reported that Mr Baldry had been "paid more than £37,000 for 29 hours' work between September and December by Sarosh Zaiwalla, a London-based solicitor who had acted for the Ibori family." Later that same month, The Independent printed a correction and an apology over a report in which they had suggested that Tony Baldry had "lobbied" on behalf of James Ibori. The correction clarified that Mr Baldry had not lobbied on Mr Ibori's behalf, and supported his claim that despite it being contrary to legal protocol, he had written to the Foreign Secretary in his capacity as a barrister, and not as an MP. It was reported in issue 1320 of the Private Eye that Baldry's own libel solicitor had described the letter's purpose as pointing out that once the case was resolved "relevant agencies might want to reflect on lessons learned."

==== Panama Papers ====
Tony Baldry was named in the Panama Papers. He was chairman of Westminster Oil Ltd, which was a company registered in the British Virgin Islands. Westminster Oil owned a second company called Westminster Caspian, which was active in Kazakhstan. When asked why the company was registered in the British Virgin Islands, Baldry said, "Given that the project was based in Kazakhstan, and given that the directors and shareholders came from the United States, the United Kingdom and Kazakhstan, whatever jurisdiction was chosen to register the company would inevitably have been 'offshore' to a number of the shareholders and directors", according to a quote in The Guardian.

== Political funding ==
The Banbury Conservative Constituency Association has received £481,521.32 according to searchthemoney.com. Baldry has received £86,659.32 in remunerations for work done since 2010 from Woburn Energy Plc, an oil- and gas-related company. As of 2012, for work done for Zaiwalla and Co. solicitors, Baldry has been compensated £162,200 in remunerations.

== Personal life ==
Baldry is a practising barrister and Head of Chambers at 1 Essex Court in the Temple, London.

He lives in Bloxham, a village about three miles away from Banbury. He married his second wife, Pippa, on 25 May 2001 and has two children, Honor and Edward, from his first marriage.

Baldry is a declared Freemason and has made speeches to parliament on the subject. In 1998 Baldry described himself as "the only surviving member of the Grand Lodge in the House" and in subsequent interviews stated that he was aware of "about a dozen" fellow MPs who were active Freemasons (although not necessarily, like him, members of the Grand Lodge).

According to the Register of Member's Interests and on his website, Baldry confirms alongside his parliamentary duties that he is a Director of Westminster Oil ("development of oil licences and exploration"), West Africa Investments ("investing in infrastructure and natural resource projects in Sierra Leone and elsewhere in West Africa"), Halcyon Oil ("a Hong Kong registered company focusing on oil exploration and discovery projects in Central Asia"). He is a director of Mastermailer Holdings plc, and Deputy Chair of Woburn Energy plc, a company "specialising in oil exploration and recovery".

In September 2012 it was reported that Baldry crashed his car into four stationary vehicles, a bollard, and a portable toilet while attempting to park. Police breath tests later proved negative.

== Honours ==
Baldry was knighted in the 2012 Birthday Honours for public and political service.

In 2016 the dormant title of High Steward of Banbury was revived for Baldry. He was appointed a Deputy Lieutenant for the County of Oxfordshire on 4 February 2016. This gave him the Post Nominal Letters "DL" for Life.

In 2016, he was awarded the Langton Award for Community Service by the Archbishop of Canterbury "for his community service, especially as an advocate for the continuing contribution of parish churches to the common good".

Parliament of the United Kingdom
Preceded by Neil Marten	Member of Parliament for Banbury; 1983–2015	Succeeded by Victoria Prentis
Political offices
Preceded by Michael Jack	Minister of State for Agriculture, Fisheries and Food; 1995–1997	Succeeded by Jeff Rooker

Honorary titles
Preceded by 20th Baron Saye and Sele	High Steward of Banbury; 2016–Present	Succeeded by TBD
