= Sir Francis Samuelson, 3rd Baronet =

Sir Francis Samuelson, Bt JP

High Sheriff of Yorkshire
- In office 1917–1919
- Preceded by: Joseph Constantine
- Succeeded by: Arthur Charles Dorman

Personal details
- Born: Francis Arthur Edward Samuelson; 26 February 1861
- Died: 3 January 1946 (aged 84)
- Spouse: Fanny Isabel Wright (after 1888)
- Children: 4
- Parent(s): Sir Bernhard Samuelson, 1st Baronet; Caroline Blundell
- Education: Rugby School
- Alma mater: Balliol College, Oxford

Sir Francis Arthur Edward Samuelson, 3rd Baronet JP (26 February 1861 – 3 January 1946) was an English industrialist.

== Early life ==
Samuelson was born on 26 February 1861. He was the second son of Sir Bernhard Samuelson, 1st Baronet and, his first wife, Caroline Blundell. After his mother's death, his father married Lelia Mathilda (née Serena) Denny, daughter of Chevalier Leon Serena and the widow of William Denny of Dumbarton. Among his siblings were Sir Henry Samuelson, 2nd Baronet, MP for Cheltenham and Frome, Godfrey Blundell Samuelson, MP for Forest of Dean, and Sir Herbert Walter Samuelson, chairman and treasurer of University College Hospital.

His mother was the fifth daughter of Henry Blundell of Hull, and his paternal grandparents were Sarah (née Hertz) Samuelson and Samuel Hermann Samuelson, a Liverpool merchant.

He was educated at Rugby School and graduated from Balliol College, Oxford with a Bachelor of Arts.

== Career ==
As his elder brother followed their father into politics, serving as a Member of Parliament, Francis followed their father into business and served as chairman of Sir B. Samuelson & Company in Middlesbrough (which operated blast furnaces) and Samuelson & Company in Banbury (which produced over 8,000 reaping machines by 1872). He was President of the Iron and Steel Institute.

Upon the death of his elder brother, he succeeded as the 3rd Baronet Samuelson, of Bodicote on 14 March 1937. He held the office of Justice of the Peace and served as High Sheriff of Yorkshire between 1917 and 1919.

== Personal life ==
On 24 April 1888, Samuelson was married to Fanny Isabel Wright (1859–1897), a daughter of William Merritt Wright, of Canada. Together, they lived at Breckenbrough Hall in Thirsk, and were the parents of one son and three daughters:

- Gertrude Evelyn Frances Samuelson (1889–1951), who died unmarried.
- Francis Henry Bernard Samuelson (1890–1981), who married Margaret Kendall Barnes, daughter of H. Kendall Barnes, in 1913.
- Phyllis Mary Samuelson (b. 1891), who married Edward Hamilton McCormick, son of L. Hamilton McCormick, in 1913.
- Muriel Gertrude Samuelson (b. 1893), who married Col. Bassett Fitzgerald Wilson, son of Maurice Fitzgerald Wilson, in 1915.

His wife died from injuries suffered while her hair was being dressed with a petroleum hair wash, which caught fire. Sir Francis died on 3 January 1946. He was succeeded in the baronetcy by his only son, Francis.

Baronetage of the United Kingdom
Preceded by Henry Samuelson	Baronet (of Bodicote); 1937–1946	Succeeded by Francis Henry Bernard Samuelson
