= Select Committee on Scientific Instruction =

The Select Committee on Scientific Instruction was a select committee of the House of Commons in the Parliament of the United Kingdom that sat from 1867 to 1868. Its chairman was Sir Bernhard Samuelson.

The Report of the Committee concluded in July 1868:

1. Efficient elementary instruction should be available to every child to enable the working class to benefit from scientific instruction.
2. In order for this to be effective, regular attendance of the child for a sufficient period must be obtained.
3. Elementary schools should teach drawing, physical geography and "the phenomena of nature".
4. All those who are not obliged to leave school before the age of 14 should be taught science.
5. Parliament and the nation should consider immediately the reorganization of secondary education and the introduction of more scientific teaching.
6. Certain endowed schools in the relevant districts should be reconstituted as science schools. Exhibitions open to public competition would enable children of every grade to rise from the lowest to the highest school.
7. Fees alone cannot adequately fund colleges of science and schools of scientific education: the State, the localities, endowments or other benefactors could contribute.
8. Centres of industry are the ideal locations for such colleges and schools due to the possibilities of combining science with practice, and also because some pupils would not be able to live far away from home.
9. The agricultural districts in particular and the provinces of England in general do not enjoy sufficient State grants for scientific education.
10. These provinces of England are entitled to increased funding.
11. Increased pay for science teachers would probably ensure the establishment and permanence of elementary science classes.
12. The Public Libraries and Museums Act should be amended to enable public bodies to charge slightly more for scientific purposes.
13. The managers of teacher training colleges should devote more time to instructing elementary teachers in theoretical and applied science.
14. Teachers in elementary day schools should be paid on the basis of the results for teaching science to older scholars. The universities of Oxford and Cambridge should grant degrees in science.
15. A closer relationship between government institutions for scientific instruction in London would increase the efficiency of each institution.
