= Over Compton =

Village in Dorset, England

Coordinates: 50.9503°N 2.5841°W

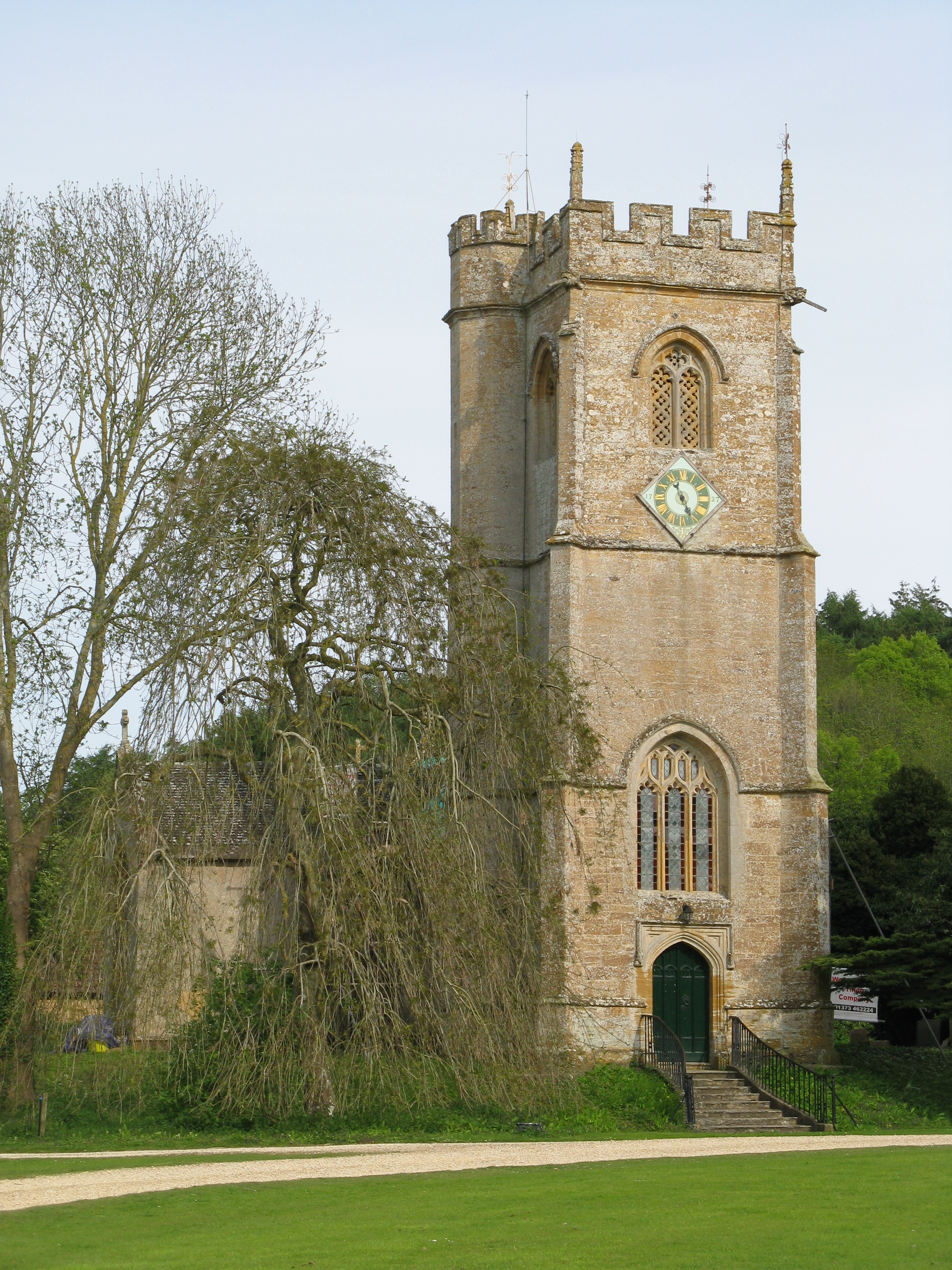
- Over Compton Church

- Location within Dorset
- Population: 183
- OS grid reference: ST590169
- Unitary authority: Dorset
- Ceremonial county: Dorset
- Region: South West
- Country: England
- Sovereign state: United Kingdom
- Post town: Sherborne
- Postcode district: DT9
- Police: Dorset
- Fire: Dorset and Wiltshire
- Ambulance: South Western
- UK Parliament: West Dorset

Over Compton is a village and civil parish in north west Dorset, England, situated in the Yeo valley 2 miles (3.2 km) east of Yeovil. In the 2011 census the parish had a population of 183.

Compton House, formerly the home of the Goodden family, lies outside the village. St Michael's Church is on the estate. The MCC cricketer Cecil Goodden was born in Compton House.
