= Banbury (constituency) =

Parliamentary constituency in the United Kingdom, 1801 onwards

Coordinates: 51.97°N 1.40°W

- County constituency for the House of Commons
- Boundaries since 2024
- Boundary of Banbury in South East England
- County: Oxfordshire
- Electorate: 69,943 (2023)
- Major settlements: Banbury, Charlbury and Chipping Norton

Current constituency
- Created: 1553
- Member of Parliament: Sean Woodcock (Labour)
- Seats: One

Banbury is a constituency in Oxfordshire (Note: A county constituency (for the purposes of election expenses and type of returning officer)) created in 1553 and represented in the House of Commons of the UK Parliament. (Note: As with all constituencies, the constituency elects one Member of Parliament (MP) by the first past the post system of election at least every five years) Its current MP is Sean Woodcock of the Labour Party, who gained the seat at the 2024 general election.

== Constituency profile ==
The constituency is located in Oxfordshire and stretches over parts of the Cherwell and West Oxfordshire local government districts. It is largely rural and agricultural, with the western area forming part of the Cotswolds. The constituency includes the large market town of Banbury, the small towns of Chipping Norton and Charlbury, and many smaller villages.

Banbury is an important local centre for commerce and industry, especially in the motorsport sector. In 2016 the town had one of the lowest unemployment rates in the country. Chipping Norton is known for the Chipping Norton set, a group of high-profile media and political personalities who live in the area. Residents of the constituency are wealthier than the national average and around 90% of the population are white.

At the most recent local elections in 2024, voters in Banbury elected mostly Labour councillors, whilst the seats in the rural parts of the constituency mostly went to the Conservatives and Liberal Democrats. The constituency is estimated to have voted marginally in favour of remaining in the European Union in the 2016 referendum.

== History ==
The constituency was created as a parliamentary borough, consisting of the town of Banbury, on 26 January 1554 through the efforts of Henry Stafford and Thomas Denton. It was one of the few in England in the unreformed House of Commons to elect only one Member of Parliament (MP) to the House of Commons of England until 1707, then to the House of Commons of Great Britain from 1707 to 1800, and finally to the House of Commons of the United Kingdom from 1801 onwards. As such, it used the first past the post system.

It was the seat represented by Lord North, the prime minister during the American War of Independence.

Under the Redistribution of Seats Act 1885, the Parliamentary Borough was abolished and was reconstituted as the Northern or Banbury Division of Oxfordshire when the three-member Parliamentary County of Oxfordshire was divided into the three single-member seats: Banbury, Woodstock and Henley. It comprised the north-western part of Oxfordshire, including Chipping Norton as well as the abolished borough. Banbury has remained as such since then with varying boundaries (see below).

== Political history ==
Majority views

Banbury had a post-World War I unbroken Conservative representation and significant local support for the party for more than a century, from 1922 to 2024; during that period, the largest vote had been for a Conservative. Since then, its representatives have all served long terms in office, and its MPs from 1922 to 2015 have all been knighted. Although the seat saw a very close election in 1923, the seat would turn out to be one of the Tories' safe seats in the succeeding elections: in 2010, Tony Baldry (Conservative) almost doubled his majority, while the 2015 result made the seat the 125th safest of the Conservative Party's 331 seats by percentage of majority. Victoria Prentis would hold the seat for the Conservatives for nine more years after 2015, until the 2024 general election saw the Labour candidate, Sean Woodcock, win the seat; consequently, this was the first time that the constituency elected a Labour Party MP.

In June 2016, an estimated 50.35% of local adults voting in the EU membership referendum chose to leave the European Union instead of to remain.

Other parties

Four of the six parties' candidates achieved more than the deposit-retaining threshold of 5% of the vote in 2015. In 2001, the Labour Party candidate Lesley Silbey won the largest opposing-party share of the vote since 1974 — 35% of the vote. Prior to 1974, the highest percentage of votes for the second-placed candidate was in 1945 — 48% of the vote.

== Boundaries and boundary changes ==
=== 1885–1918 ===
- The Borough of Banbury;and
- The Sessional Divisions of Banbury and Bloxham, Chadlington, and Wootton North.

=== 1918–1950 ===
- The Boroughs of Banbury, Chipping Norton, and Woodstock;
- The Urban District of Witney; and
- The Rural Districts of Banbury, Chipping Norton, Witney, and Woodstock.

The constituency was expanded to include the western half of the abolished Woodstock Division, including Witney and Woodstock.

=== 1950–1974 ===
- The Boroughs of Banbury, Chipping Norton, and Woodstock;
- The Urban District of Witney;
- The Rural Districts of Banbury, Chipping Norton, and Witney; and
- The Rural District of Ploughley parishes of Begbroke, Gosford and Water Eaton, Hampton Gay and Poyle, Kidlington, Shipton on Cherwell, Thrupp, and Yarnton.

Change to contents due to reorganisation of rural districts. Marginal loss to the Oxford constituency as a result of the expansion of the County Borough of Oxford.

=== 1974–1983 ===
- The Boroughs of Banbury, Chipping Norton, and Woodstock;
- The Urban District of Bicester;
- The Rural Districts of Banbury and Chipping Norton; and
- The Rural District of Ploughley parishes of Ardley, Bucknell, Caversfield, Chesterton, Cottisford, Finmere, Fringford, Fritwell, Godington, Hardwick with Tusmore, Hethe, Kirtlington, Launton, Lower Heyford, Middleton Stoney, Mixbury, Newton Purcell with Shelswell, Somerton, Souldern, Stoke Lyne, Stratton Audley, and Upper Heyford.

The Urban and Rural Districts of Witney and the parts of the Rural District of Ploughley, including Kidlington, formed the basis of the new constituency of Mid-Oxon. Bicester and northern parts of the Rural District of Ploughley transferred from Henley.

=== 1983–1997 ===
- The District of Cherwell wards of Adderbury, Ambrosden, Ardley, Bicester East, Bicester South, Bicester West, Bloxham, Bodicote, Calthorpe, Chesterton, Cropredy, Deddington, Easington, Fringford, Grimsbury, Hardwick, Heyford, Hook Norton, Hornton, Kirtlington, Launton, Neithrop, Otmoor, Ruscote, Sibford, Steeple Aston, and Wroxton; and
- The District of West Oxfordshire wards of Bartons and Tackley, and Wootton.

Gained a small part of the abolished constituency of Mid-Oxon, to the south of Bicester. The bulk of the area comprising the former Urban and Rural Districts of Chipping Norton transferred to the new constituency of Witney.

=== 1997–2010 ===
- The District of Cherwell wards of Adderbury, Ambrosden, Ardley, Bicester East, Bicester South, Bicester West, Bloxham, Bodicote, Calthorpe, Chesterton, Cropredy, Deddington, Easington, Fringford, Grimsbury, Hardwick, Heyford, Hook Norton, Hornton, Kirtlington, Launton, Neithrop, Otmoor, Ruscote, Sibford, Steeple Aston, and Wroxton.

Minor loss to Witney, comprising the two wards in the District of West Oxfordshire.

=== 2010–2024 ===
Map of boundaries 2010-2024
- The District of Cherwell wards of Adderbury, Ambrosden and Chesterton, Banbury Calthorpe, Banbury Easington, Banbury Grimsbury and Castle, Banbury Hardwick, Banbury Neithrop, Banbury Ruscote, Bicester East, Bicester North, Bicester South, Bicester Town, Bicester West, Bloxham and Bodicote, Caversfield, Cropredy, Deddington, Fringford, Hook Norton, Launton, Sibford, The Astons and Heyfords, and Wroxton.

Two wards in the District of Cherwell to the south of Bicester (Kirtlington and Otmoor) transferred to Henley.

The 2010 constituency covered the north-east of Oxfordshire, around Banbury and Bicester and largely corresponded to the Cherwell local government district, with the principal exception of the large village of Kidlington on the outskirts of Oxford which lies in the Oxford West and Abingdon constituency, and some smaller villages to the north-east of Oxford that lie in the Henley constituency.

=== 2024–present ===
Further to the 2023 Periodic Review of Westminster constituencies which became effective for the 2024 general election, the constituency is composed of the following electoral wards (as they existed on 1 December 2020):

- The District of Cherwell wards of: Adderbury, Bloxham & Bodicote; Banbury, Calthorpe & Easington; Banbury Cross & Neithrop; Banbury Grimsbury & Hightown; Banbury Hardwick; Banbury Ruscote; Cropredy, Sibfords & Wroxton; Deddington.
- The District of West Oxfordshire wards of: Chadlington and Churchill; Charlbury and Finstock; Chipping Norton; Kingham, Rollright and Enstone; The Bartons.

Major changes, with the town of Bicester and surrounding areas, comprising 38.5% of the existing electorate, being included in the newly created constituency of Bicester and Woodstock. This was partly offset by the transfer from Witney of north-western parts of the District of West Oxfordshire, including Chipping Norton and Charlbury.

== Members of Parliament ==
=== Banbury borough (until 1885) ===
==== MPs 1554–1640 ====
Constituency created 1554. (Even before the Reform Act 1832, Banbury only returned one member to Parliament)

Parliament	Member
Parliament of 1554 (April)	Thomas Denton
Parliament of 1554 (November)	Edward Stafford, 3rd Baron Stafford
Parliament of 1555	Not known
Parliament of 1558	John Denton
Parliament of 1559	Thomas Lee
Parliament of 1563	Francis Walsingham (sat for Lyme Regis, replaced by Owen Brereton)
Parliament of 1571	Anthony Cope
Parliament of 1572	Anthony Cope
Parliament of 1584	Richard Fiennes
Parliament of 1586	Anthony Cope
Parliament of 1588	Anthony Cope
Parliament of 1593	Anthony Cope
Parliament of 1597	Anthony Cope
Parliament of 1601	Anthony Cope
Parliament of 1604–1611	Sir William Cope
Addled Parliament (1614)	Sir William Cope
Parliament of 1621–1622	Sir William Cope
Happy Parliament (1624–1625)	Sir Erasmus Dryden
Useless Parliament (1625)	Sir William Cope (Election declared void, replaced by James Fiennes)
Parliament of 1626	Calcot Chambre
Parliament of 1628–1629	John Crew
No Parliament summoned 1629–1640

==== MPs 1640–1885 ====
Year	Member	Party
April 1640	Nathaniel Fiennes	Parliamentarian
1648	Fiennes excluded in Pride's Purge – seat left vacant	
1653	Banbury was unrepresented in the Barebones Parliament and the First and Second Parliaments of the Protectorate	
January 1659	Nathaniel Fiennes, the younger	
May 1659	Banbury was not represented in the restored Rump	
April 1660	Sir Anthony Cope	
1661	Sir John Holman	
1685	Sir Dudley North	
1689	Sir Robert Dashwood	
1698	James Isaacson	
1699	Sir John Cope	Whig
1700	Patrick Friel	
1701	Charles North	
1713	Sir Jonathan Cope	Tory
1722	Monoux Cope	Whig
1727	Hon. Francis North	Whig
1730	Toby Chauncy	
1733	William Knollys	
1740	William Moore	
1746	John Willes	
1754	Frederick North, Lord North	Tory
1790	George North, Lord North	
1792	Hon. Frederick North	
1794	William Holbech	
1796	Dudley Long North	
1806	William Praed	
1808	Dudley Long North	
1812	Frederick Sylvester North Douglas	
1819	Hon. Heneage Legge	
1826	Hon. Arthur Legge	
1830	Henry Villiers-Stuart	Tory
1831	John Easthope	Radical
1832	Henry William Tancred	Whig
February 1859	Bernhard Samuelson	Whig
April 1859	Sir Charles Eurwicke Douglas	Ind. Liberal
1865	Sir Bernhard Samuelson, Bt	Liberal
1885	Borough abolished – name transferred to county division	

=== Banbury division of Oxfordshire/Banbury County Constituency (since 1885) ===
Election	Member	Party
1885	Sir Bernhard Samuelson	Liberal
1895	Albert Brassey	Conservative
1906	Eustace Fiennes	Liberal
January 1910	Robert Brassey	Conservative
December 1910	Eustace Fiennes	Liberal
1918 by-election	Sir Rhys Rhys-Williams, 1st Baronet	Liberal
1918	Sir Rhys Rhys-Williams, 1st Baronet	Coalition Liberal
1922	James Edmondson	Conservative
1945	Douglas Dodds-Parker	Conservative
1959	Neil Marten	Conservative
1983	Tony Baldry	Conservative
2015	Victoria Prentis	Conservative
2024	Sean Woodcock	Labour

== Elections ==
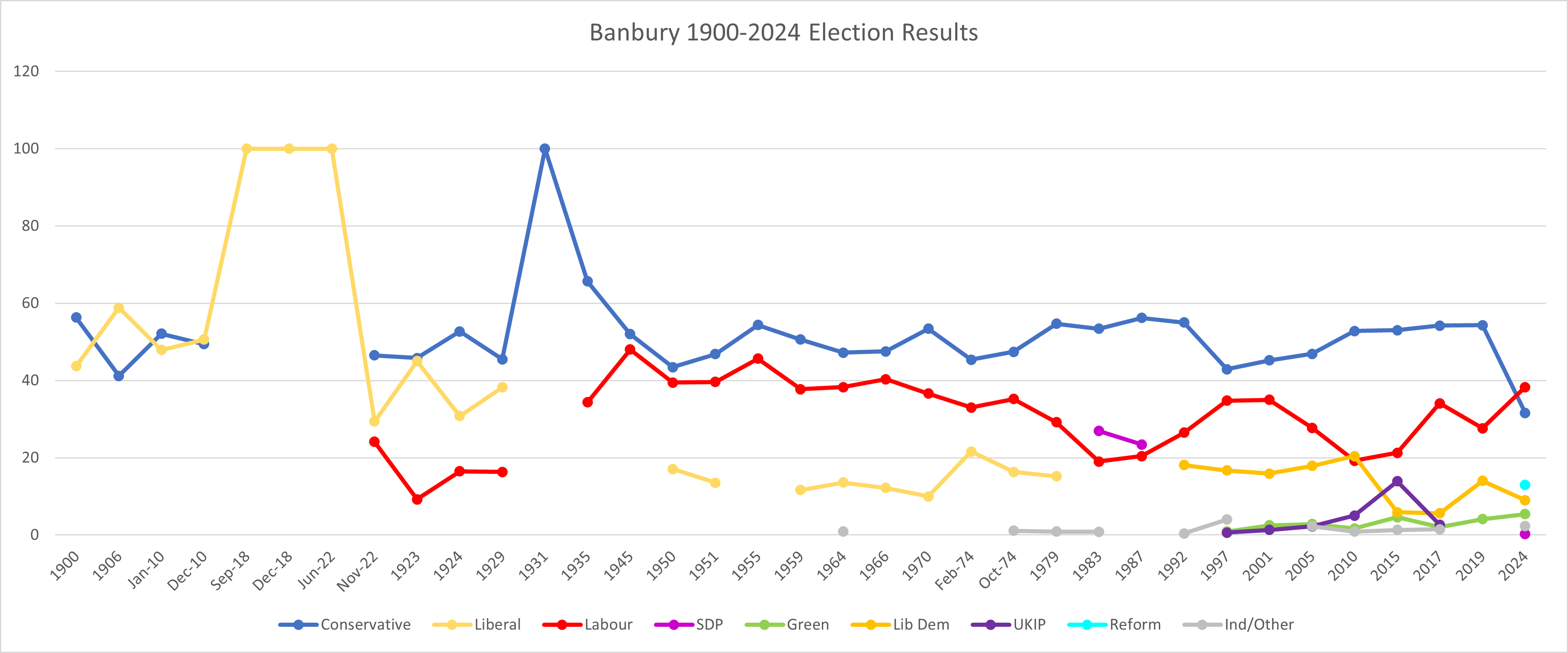
Banbury 1900-2024 Election Results

=== Elections in the 2020s ===
General election 2024: Banbury
Party	Candidate	Votes	%	±%
Labour	Sean Woodcock	18,468	38.3	▲13.5
Conservative	Victoria Prentis	15,212	31.6	▼20.4
Reform	Paul Topley	6,284	13.0	new
Liberal Democrats	Liz Adams	4,352	9.0	▼11.3
Green	Arron Baker	2,615	5.4	▲2.5
Independent	Cassi Bellingham	850	1.8	new
Climate	Chris Nevile	242	0.5	new
SDP	Declan Soper	155	0.3	new
Majority		3,256	6.7	
Turnout		48,178	65.8	▼6.8
Registered electors		73,193		
Labour gain from Conservative		Swing	▲17.0	

=== Elections in the 2010s ===
2019 notional result
Party	Vote	%
Conservative	26,397	52.0
Labour	12,598	24.8
Liberal Democrats	10,335	20.3
Green	1,480	2.9
Turnout	50,810	72.6
Electorate	69,943	

General election 2019: Banbury
Party	Candidate	Votes	%	±%
Conservative	Victoria Prentis	34,148	54.3	+0.1
Labour	Suzette Watson	17,335	27.6	−6.5
Liberal Democrats	Tim Bearder	8,831	14.0	+8.4
Green	Ian Middleton	2,607	4.1	+2.1
Majority		16,813	26.7	+6.6
Turnout		62,921	69.8	−3.7
Conservative hold		Swing	+3.3	

General election 2017: Banbury
Party	Candidate	Votes	%	±%
Conservative	Victoria Prentis	33,388	54.2	+1.2
Labour	Sean Woodcock	20,989	34.1	+12.8
Liberal Democrats	John Howson	3,452	5.6	−0.3
UKIP	Dickie Bird	1,581	2.6	−11.3
Green	Ian Middleton	1,225	2.0	−2.6
Independent	Roseanne Edwards	927	1.5	N/A
Majority		12,399	20.1	−11.6
Turnout		61,652	73.5	+7.9
Conservative hold		Swing	−5.8	

General election 2015: Banbury
Party	Candidate	Votes	%	±%
Conservative	Victoria Prentis	30,749	53.0	+0.2
Labour	Sean Woodcock	12,354	21.3	+2.1
UKIP	Dickie Bird	8,050	13.9	+8.9
Liberal Democrats	John Howson	3,440	5.9	−14.5
Green	Ian Middleton	2,686	4.6	+2.9
NHA	Roseanne Edwards	729	1.3	N/A
Majority		18,395	31.7	−0.7
Turnout		58,008	65.6	+0.9
Conservative hold		Swing	−0.97	

General election 2010: Banbury
Party	Candidate	Votes	%	±%
Conservative	Tony Baldry	29,703	52.8	+5.9
Liberal Democrats	David Rundle	11,476	20.4	+2.9
Labour	Leslie Sibley	10,773	19.2	−8.9
UKIP	David Fairweather	2,806	5.0	+2.8
Green	Alastair White	959	1.7	−1.1
Independent	Roseanne Edwards	524	0.9	N/A
Majority		18,227	32.4	+21.8
Turnout		56,241	64.7	+0.2
Conservative hold		Swing	+1.5	

=== Elections in the 2000s ===
General election 2005: Banbury
Party	Candidate	Votes	%	±%
Conservative	Tony Baldry	26,382	46.9	+1.7
Labour	Leslie Sibley	15,585	27.7	−7.3
Liberal Democrats	Zoe Patrick	10,076	17.9	+2.0
Green	Alyson Duckmanton	1,590	2.8	+0.3
UKIP	Diana Heimann	1,241	2.2	+0.9
National Front	James Starkey	918	1.6	N/A
Your Party	Chris Rowe	417	0.7	N/A
Majority		10,797	19.2	+9.0
Turnout		56,209	64.5	+3.4
Conservative hold		Swing	+4.5	

General election 2001: Banbury
Party	Candidate	Votes	%	±%
Conservative	Tony Baldry	23,271	45.2	+2.3
Labour	Leslie Sibley	18,052	35.0	+0.2
Liberal Democrats	Anthony Worgan	8,216	15.9	−0.8
Green	Bevis Cotton	1,281	2.5	+1.6
UKIP	Stephen Harris	695	1.3	+0.7
Majority		5,219	10.2	+2.1
Turnout		51,515	61.1	−14.0
Conservative hold		Swing	+1.0	

=== Elections in the 1990s ===
General election 1997: Banbury
Party	Candidate	Votes	%	±%
Conservative	Tony Baldry	25,076	42.9	−12.1
Labour	Hazel Y. Peperell	20,339	34.8	+8.3
Liberal Democrats	Catherine Bearder	9,761	16.7	−1.4
Referendum	James W. Ager	2,245	3.8	N/A
Green	Bevis Cotton	530	0.9	N/A
UKIP	L. King	364	0.62	N/A
Natural Law	Ian Pearson	131	0.22	−0.2
Majority		4,737	8.1	−20.4
Turnout		58,446	75.1	−6.0
Conservative hold		Swing		

General election 1992: Banbury
Party	Candidate	Votes	%	±%
Conservative	Tony Baldry	32,215	55.0	−1.2
Labour	Angela Billingham	15,495	26.5	+6.1
Liberal Democrats	Geoffrey J. Fisher	10,602	18.1	−5.3
Natural Law	Robin Ticciati	250	0.4	N/A
Majority		16,720	28.5	−4.3
Turnout		58,562	81.5	+5.3
Conservative hold		Swing	−3.6	

=== Elections in the 1980s ===
General election 1987: Banbury
Party	Candidate	Votes	%	±%
Conservative	Tony Baldry	29,716	56.2	+2.8
SDP	David Rowland	12,386	23.4	−3.5
Labour	James Honeybone	10,789	20.4	+1.4
Majority		17,330	32.8	+6.3
Turnout		52,891	76.2	+1.0
Conservative hold		Swing		

General election 1983: Banbury
Party	Candidate	Votes	%	±%
Conservative	Tony Baldry	26,225	53.4	−1.3
SDP	Keith Fitchett	13,200	26.9	+11.7
Labour	Brian Hodgson	9,343	19.0	
Monster Raving Loony	David Brough	383	0.8	N/A
Majority		13,025	26.5	
Turnout		49,151	75.2	
Conservative hold		Swing		

=== Elections in the 1970s ===
General election 1979: Banbury
Party	Candidate	Votes	%	±%
Conservative	Neil Marten	31,137	54.7	+7.3
Labour	Brian Hodgson	16,623	29.2	−6.0
Liberal	M. White	8,658	15.2	−1.1
National Front	I. Cherry	504	0.9	N/A
Majority		14,514	25.5	+13.3
Turnout		56,922	78.3	+2.6
Conservative hold		Swing		

General election October 1974: Banbury
Party	Candidate	Votes	%	±%
Conservative	Neil Marten	24,210	47.4	+2.0
Labour	Anthony C. Booth	18,019	35.2	+2.2
Liberal	David Charlton	8,352	16.3	−5.3
Independent English Nationalist	Julian Barbour	547	1.1	N/A
Majority		6,191	12.2	−0.2
Turnout		51,128	75.71	−7.1
Conservative hold		Swing		

General election February 1974: Banbury
Party	Candidate	Votes	%	±%
Conservative	Neil Marten	25,167	45.4	−7.6
Labour	Anthony C. Booth	18,289	33.0	−3.4
Liberal	Geoffrey J. Fisher	11,947	21.6	+11.0
Majority		6,878	12.4	−4.4
Turnout		55,403	82.8	
Conservative hold		Swing		

General election 1970: Banbury
Party	Candidate	Votes	%	±%
Conservative	Neil Marten	36,712	53.4	+5.9
Labour	Anthony C. Booth	25,166	36.6	−3.7
Liberal	Geoffrey J. Fisher	6,859	10.0	−2.2
Majority		11,546	16.8	+9.6
Turnout		68,737	77.4	−4.6
Conservative hold		Swing		

=== Elections in the 1960s ===
General election 1966: Banbury
Party	Candidate	Votes	%	±%
Conservative	Neil Marten	28,932	47.5	+0.3
Labour	David Young	24,529	40.3	+2.0
Liberal	Penelope Jessel	7,407	12.2	−1.4
Majority		4,403	7.2	−1.7
Turnout		60,868	82.0	−0.4
Conservative hold		Swing		

General election 1964: Banbury
Party	Candidate	Votes	%	±%
Conservative	Neil Marten	27,281	47.2	−3.4
Labour	Gerald Fowler	22,159	38.3	+0.6
Liberal	Francis John Ware	7,851	13.6	+2.0
Farmers' Candidate	James Hayward	534	0.9	N/A
Majority		5,122	8.9	−3.0
Turnout		57,825	82.4	+1.4
Conservative hold		Swing		

=== Elections in the 1950s ===
General election 1959: Banbury
Party	Candidate	Votes	%	±%
Conservative	Neil Marten	26,413	50.61	
Labour	David Buckle	19,699	37.75	
Liberal	Kenneth Colman	6,074	11.64	N/A
Majority		6,714	12.86	
Turnout		52,186	81.02	
Conservative hold		Swing		

General election 1955: Banbury
Party	Candidate	Votes	%	±%
Conservative	Douglas Dodds-Parker	25,598	54.38	
Labour	Norman Francis Stogdon	21,473	45.62	
Majority		4,125	8.76	
Turnout		47,071	77.14	
Conservative hold		Swing		

General election 1951: Banbury
Party	Candidate	Votes	%	±%
Conservative	Douglas Dodds-Parker	23,246	46.84	
Labour	William J. Bird	19,672	39.64	
Liberal	Lawrence Robson	6,706	13.51	
Majority		3,574	7.20	
Turnout		49,624	82.85	
Conservative hold		Swing		

General election 1950: Banbury
Party	Candidate	Votes	%	±%
Conservative	Douglas Dodds-Parker	21,365	43.46	
Labour Co-op	Cyril Rawlett Fenton	19,408	39.48	
Liberal	Lawrence Robson	8,392	17.07	N/A
Majority		1,957	3.98	
Turnout		49,165	83.60	
Conservative hold		Swing		

=== Election in the 1940s ===
General election 1945: Banbury
Party	Candidate	Votes	%	±%
Conservative	Douglas Dodds-Parker	23,777	52.00	−13.66
Labour	Richard Brian Roach	21,951	48.00	+13.66
Majority		1,826	4.00	−27.32
Turnout		45,728	70.55	+4.93
Conservative hold		Swing	-13.66	

General Election 1939–40: Another General Election was required to take place before the end of 1940. The political parties had been making preparations for an election to take place from 1939 and by the end of this year, the following candidates had been selected;

- Independent Progressive: Patrick Early

=== Elections in the 1930s ===
General election 1935: Banbury
Party	Candidate	Votes	%	±%
Conservative	James Edmondson	21,904	65.66	N/A
Labour	W E Wade	11,456	34.34	N/A
Majority		10,448	31.32	N/A
Turnout		33,360	65.82	N/A
Conservative hold		Swing	N/A	

General election 1931: Banbury
Party	Candidate	Votes	%	±%
Conservative	James Edmondson	Unopposed		
Conservative hold				

=== Election in the 1920s ===
General election 1929: Banbury
Party	Candidate	Votes	%	±%
Conservative	James Edmondson	16,444	45.5	−7.2
Liberal	Ronald Wilberforce Allen	13,800	38.2	+7.4
Labour	Lawrence Arthur Wingfield	5,894	16.3	−0.2
Majority		2,644	7.3	−14.6
Turnout		36,138	78.7	−0.6
Conservative hold		Swing	−7.3	

Verney

General election 1924: Banbury
Party	Candidate	Votes	%	±%
Conservative	James Edmondson	15,053	52.7	+6.9
Liberal	Harry Verney	8,825	30.8	−14.2
Labour	Arthur Ernest Monks	4,733	16.5	+7.3
Majority		6,228	21.9	+21.1
Turnout		28,611	79.3	+3.3
Conservative hold		Swing		

Fry

General election 1923: Banbury
Party	Candidate	Votes	%	±%
Conservative	James Edmondson	12,490	45.8	−0.7
Liberal	C. B. Fry	12,271	45.0	+15.6
Labour	Ernest Bennett	2,500	9.2	−14.9
Majority		219	0.8	−16.3
Turnout		27,261	76.0	−0.4
Conservative hold		Swing	−8.2	

General election 1922: Banbury
Party	Candidate	Votes	%	±%
Conservative	James Edmondson	12,491	46.5	N/A
Liberal	James Harold Early	7,885	29.4	N/A
Labour	Ernest Bennett	6,463	24.1	N/A
Majority		4,606	17.1	N/A
Turnout		26,839	76.4	N/A
Conservative gain from Liberal		Swing		

By-election 1922: Banbury
Party		Candidate	Votes	%	±%
C	Liberal	Rhys Rhys-Williams	Unopposed		
	Liberal hold				
C indicates candidate endorsed by the coalition government.

=== Election in the 1910s ===
General election 14 December 1918: Banbury
Party		Candidate	Votes	%	±%
C	Liberal	Rhys Rhys-Williams	Unopposed		
	Liberal hold				
C indicates candidate endorsed by the coalition government.

1918 Banbury by-election
Party	Candidate	Votes	%	±%
Liberal	Rhys Rhys-Williams	Unopposed		
Liberal hold				

General Election 1914–15: Another General Election was required to take place before the end of 1915. The political parties had been making preparations for an election to take place and by July 1914, the following candidates had been selected;

- Liberal: Eustace Fiennes
- Conservative:

General election December 1910: Banbury
Party	Candidate	Votes	%	±%
Liberal	Eustace Fiennes	3,629	50.6	+2.7
Conservative	Robert Bingham Brassey	3,538	49.4	−2.7
Majority		91	1.2	N/A
Turnout		7,167	89.4	−2.2
Registered electors		8,021		
Liberal gain from Conservative		Swing	+2.7	

General election January 1910: Banbury
Party	Candidate	Votes	%	±%
Conservative	Robert Bingham Brassey	3,831	52.1	+10.9
Liberal	Eustace Fiennes	3,516	47.9	−10.9
Majority		315	4.2	N/A
Turnout		7,347	91.6	+4.0
Registered electors		8,021		
Conservative gain from Liberal		Swing	+10.9	

=== Elections in the 1900s ===
General election 1906: Banbury
Party	Candidate	Votes	%	±%
Liberal	Eustace Fiennes	3,992	58.8	+15.1
Conservative	George Villiers	2,796	41.2	−15.1
Majority		1,196	17.6	N/A
Turnout		6,788	87.6	+5.4
Registered electors		7,748		
Liberal gain from Conservative		Swing	+15.1	

General election 1900: Banbury
Party	Candidate	Votes	%	±%
Conservative	Albert Brassey	3,632	56.3	−0.6
Liberal	Eustace Fiennes	2,821	43.7	+0.6
Majority		811	12.6	−1.2
Turnout		6,453	82.2	−5.4
Registered electors		7,853		
Conservative hold		Swing	−0.6	

=== Elections in the 1890s ===
General election 1895: Banbury
Party	Candidate	Votes	%	±%
Conservative	Albert Brassey	4,057	56.9	+8.2
Liberal	Charles W Thornton	3,074	43.1	−8.2
Majority		983	13.8	N/A
Turnout		7,131	87.6	+1.3
Registered electors		8,145		
Conservative gain from Liberal		Swing	+8.2	

General election 1892: Banbury
Party	Candidate	Votes	%	±%
Liberal	Bernhard Samuelson	3,640	51.3	−2.3
Conservative	Llewellyn Malcolm Wynne	3,453	48.7	+2.3
Majority		187	2.6	−4.6
Turnout		7,093	86.3	+5.4
Registered electors		8,223		
Liberal hold		Swing	−2.3	

=== Elections in the 1880s ===
General election 1886: Banbury
Party	Candidate	Votes	%	±%
Liberal	Bernhard Samuelson	3,677	53.6	−6.5
Conservative	Llewellyn Malcolm Wynne	3,184	46.4	+6.5
Majority		493	7.2	−13.0
Turnout		6,861	80.9	−6.1
Registered electors		8,478		
Liberal hold		Swing	−6.5	

General election 1885: Banbury
Party	Candidate	Votes	%	±%
Liberal	Bernhard Samuelson	4,436	60.1	−3.5
Conservative	Llewellyn Malcolm Wynne	2,944	39.9	+3.5
Majority		1,492	20.2	−7.0
Turnout		7,380	87.0	+3.4
Registered electors		8,478		
Liberal hold		Swing	−3.5	

General election 1880: Banbury
Party	Candidate	Votes	%	±%
Liberal	Bernhard Samuelson	1,018	63.6	+10.7
Conservative	Thomas Gibson Bowles	583	36.4	−10.7
Majority		435	27.2	+21.4
Turnout		1,601	86.6	+11.3
Registered electors		1,848		
Liberal hold		Swing	+10.7	

=== Elections in the 1870s ===
General election 1874: Banbury
Party	Candidate	Votes	%	±%
Liberal	Bernhard Samuelson	760	52.9	−13.1
Conservative	Josiah Wilkinson	676	47.1	+13.1
Majority		84	5.8	−26.2
Turnout		1,436	75.3	−1.4
Registered electors		1,906		
Liberal hold		Swing	−13.1	

=== Elections in the 1860s ===
General election 1868: Banbury
Party	Candidate	Votes	%	±%
Liberal	Bernhard Samuelson	772	66.0	+27.2
Conservative	George Stratton	397	34.0	+2.9
Majority		375	32.0	+24.3
Turnout		1,169	76.7	−9.8
Registered electors		1,524		
Liberal hold		Swing	+12.2	

General election 1865: Banbury
Party	Candidate	Votes	%	±%
Liberal	Bernhard Samuelson	206	38.8	−7.1
Conservative	Charles Bell	165	31.1	N/A
Independent Liberal	Charles Eurwicke Douglas	160	30.1	−24.0
Majority		41	7.7	N/A
Turnout		531	86.5	+21.9
Registered electors		614		
Liberal gain from Independent Liberal		Swing	+8.5	

=== Elections in the 1850s ===
General election 1859: Banbury
Party	Candidate	Votes	%	±%
Independent Liberal	Charles Eurwicke Douglas	235	54.1	N/A
Liberal	Bernhard Samuelson	199	45.9	−32.9
Majority		36	8.2	N/A
Turnout		434	64.6	+13.7
Registered electors		672		
Independent Liberal gain from Liberal		Swing	N/A	

By-election, 9 February 1859: Banbury
Party	Candidate	Votes	%	±%
Whig	Bernhard Samuelson	177	37.6	−41.2
Conservative	John Hardy	176	37.4	N/A
Independent Liberal	Edward Miall	118	25.1	N/A
Majority		1	0.2	−57.4
Turnout		471	70.1	+19.2
Registered electors		672		
Whig hold		Swing	N/A	

- Caused by Tancred's resignation.

General election 1857: Banbury
Party	Candidate	Votes	%	±%
Whig	Henry William Tancred	216	78.8	N/A
Radical	Edward Yates	58	21.2	N/A
Majority		158	57.6	N/A
Turnout		274	50.9	N/A
Registered electors		538		
Whig hold		Swing	N/A	

General election 1852: Banbury
Party	Candidate	Votes	%	±%
Whig	Henry William Tancred	Unopposed		
Registered electors		491		
Whig hold				

=== Elections in the 1840s ===
General election 1847: Banbury
Party	Candidate	Votes	%	±%
Whig	Henry William Tancred	226	57.9	+12.8
Conservative	James Macgregor	164	42.1	+5.7
Majority		62	15.9	+7.2
Turnout		390	83.9	+12.5
Registered electors		465		
Whig hold		Swing	+3.6	

General election 1841: Banbury
Party	Candidate	Votes	%	±%
Whig	Henry William Tancred	124	45.1	−25.6
Conservative	Hugh Holbech	100	36.4	+7.1
Chartist	Henry Vincent	51	18.5	N/A
Majority		24	8.7	−32.7
Turnout		275	71.4	−3.2
Registered electors		385		
Whig hold		Swing	−16.4	

=== Elections in the 1830s ===
General election 1837: Banbury
Party	Candidate	Votes	%	±%
Whig	Henry William Tancred	181	70.7	−11.3
Conservative	Henry Tawney	75	29.3	N/A
Majority		106	41.4	−22.6
Turnout		256	74.6	+6.7
Registered electors		343		
Whig hold		Swing	N/A	

General election 1835: Banbury
Party	Candidate	Votes	%	±%
Whig	Henry William Tancred	205	82.0	N/A
Radical	Edward Lloyd Williams	45	18.0	N/A
Majority		160	64.0	N/A
Turnout		250	67.9	N/A
Registered electors		368		
Whig hold		Swing	N/A	

General election 1832: Banbury
Party	Candidate	Votes	%	±%
Whig	Henry William Tancred	Unopposed		
Registered electors		329		
Whig gain from Radical				

General election 1831: Banbury
Party	Candidate	Votes	%	±%
Radical	John Easthope	6	66.7	N/A
Tory	Henry Hely-Hutchinson	3	33.3	N/A
Majority		3	33.4	N/A
Turnout		9		N/A
Radical gain from Tory		Swing	N/A	

General election 1830: Banbury
Party	Candidate	Votes	%	±%
Tory	Henry Villiers-Stuart	Unopposed		
Tory gain from Nonpartisan				

== See also ==
- List of parliamentary constituencies in Oxfordshire
- List of parliamentary constituencies in the South East England (region)
- Henley
- Oxford East
- Oxford West and Abingdon
- Wantage
- Witney
- History of Banbury, Oxfordshire

== Sources ==
- Iain Dale, ed. (2003). The Times House of Commons 1929, 1931, 1935. Politico's (reprint). ISBN 1-84275-033-X.
- The Times House of Commons 1945. 1945.
- The Times House of Commons 1950. 1950.
- The Times House of Commons 1955. 1955.
- Robert Beatson, A Chronological Register of Both Houses of Parliament (London: Longman, Hurst, Res & Orme, 1807) A Chronological Register of Both Houses of the British Parliament, from the Union in 1708, to the Third Parliament of the United Kingdom of Great Britain and Ireland, in 1807
- Stanley T. Bindoff et al. (1982). The House of Commons: 1509 – 1558; 1, Appendices, constituencies, members A – C, Volume 4. Boydell & Brewer. ISBN 0-436-04282-7. pp. 30–31.
- D Brunton & D H Pennington, Members of the Long Parliament (London: George Allen & Unwin, 1954)
- F W S Craig, British Parliamentary Election Results 1832–1885 (2nd edition, Aldershot: Parliamentary Research Services, 1989)
- The Constitutional Year Book for 1913 (London: National Union of Conservative and Unionist Associations, 1913)

Parliament of the United Kingdom
Vacant since 1766 Title last held by Bath	Constituency represented by the prime minister 1770–1782	Vacant until 1783 Title next held by Appleby
