= Henry William Tancred =

British politician

Henry William Tancred QC (1781 – 20 August 1860) was an English Whig and Liberal politician who sat in the House of Commons from 1832 to 1858.

Tancred was the second son of Sir Thomas Tancred, 5th Baronet and his wife Penelope Smith, daughter of Thomas Assheton Smith of Bowdon, Cheshire. He was educated at Eton College and admitted to Trinity Hall, Cambridge in 1799 and also at Lincoln's Inn on 4 May 1799. He migrated to Jesus College, Cambridge) on 15 October 1800. He was a scholar in 1802 and was awarded B.A. in 1804. He was also called to the Bar on 11 May 1804. He was awarded M.A. in 1807 and became a Fellow of Jesus College in 1808.

Tancred was elected as a Member of Parliament for Banbury in the 1832 general election and resigned on 4 November 1858 by appointment as Steward of the Chiltern Hundreds.

Tancred was a Bencher from 1832 to 1860. He became Q.C. in 1840 and Treasurer from 1845 to 1846. He was one of the founders of the Society for the Diffusion of Useful Knowledge. His publications included Review of the Policy of the British Government in the Treatment of its Catholic Subjects. He also published Plato's Republic and the Greek Enlightenment

Tancred died at Margate aged 78.

Parliament of the United Kingdom
Preceded by John Easthope	Member of Parliament for Banbury; 1832–1858	Succeeded by Bernhard Samuelson
