= St Michael's Church, Over Compton =

Church in Dorset, England

St Michael's Church
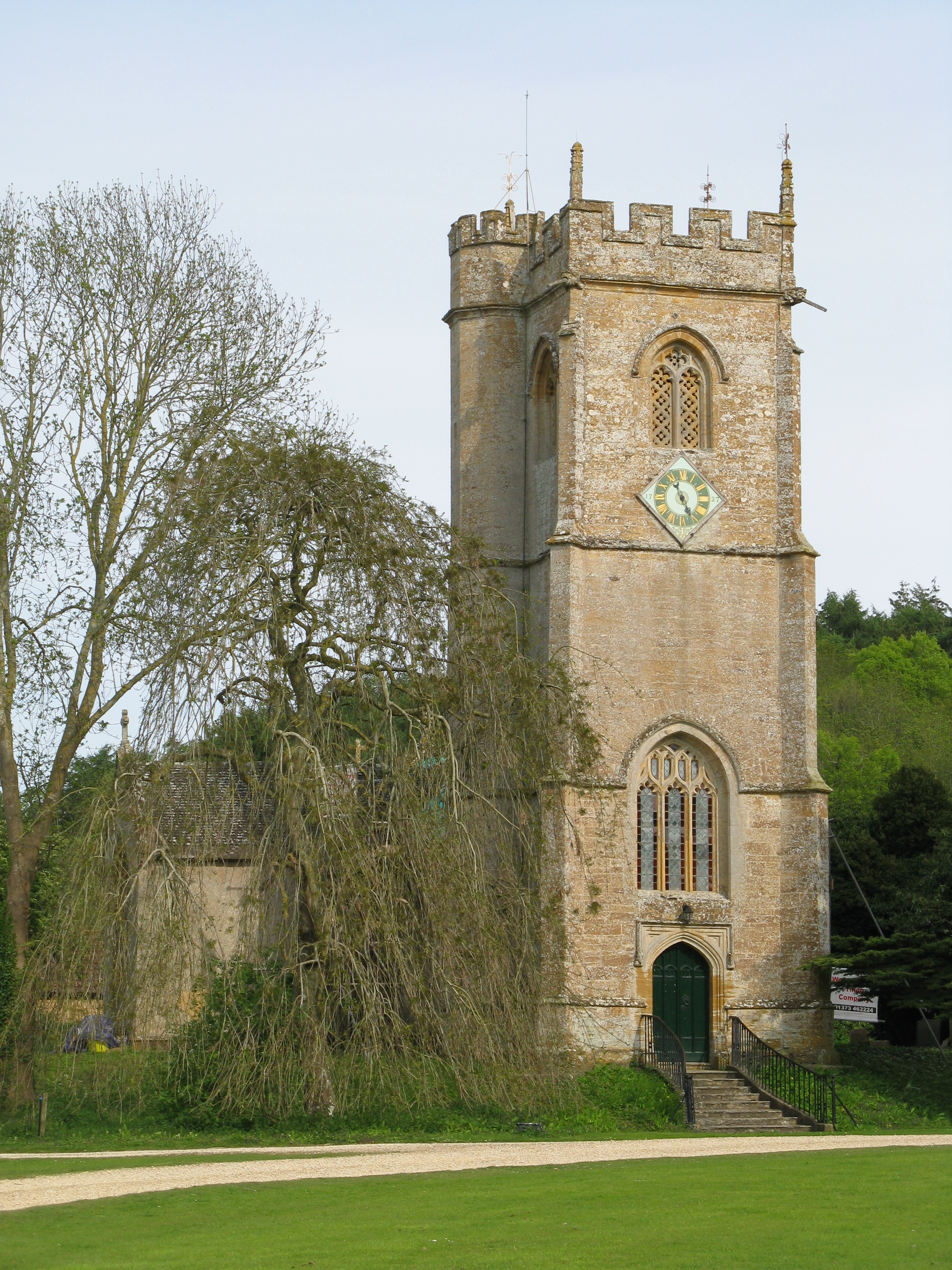

Religion
- Affiliation: Church of England
- Ecclesiastical or organizational status: Active

Location
- Location: Over Compton, Dorset, England
- Interactive map of St Michael's Church
- Coordinates: 50.9500°N 2.5784°W

Architecture
- Type: Church
- Style: Perpendicular

St Michael's Church is a Church of England church in Over Compton, Dorset, England. The church dates to the 15th-century, with later additions and restorations. The church is a Grade I listed building. In the churchyard is also a table tomb of early 18th-century date which is Grade II listed.

== History ==
The existing church dates to the 15th century, when the nave is believed to have been rebuilt, while the tower was built during the early part of the same century. Robert Goodden of the adjacent Compton House had the north chapel added in 1776 and he also had the church undergo a major restoration in 1821–22. This work included adding the north vestry and building or rebuilding the baptistery, the latter possibly being previously used as a porch.

Robert Goodden died in 1828. In 1825, he had a marble standing figure of himself placed in the north chapel and penned the accompanying inscription, leaving the date of death blank. The monument was left boarded up, waiting to be revealed after his death. He also had a vault built and a stone coffin added for his body.

A new organ was installed in the church in 1857, which was gifted by John Goodden of Compton House. The organ was built by Mr. Hayter of Cucklington and opened by Mr. Loaring of Yeovil on 27 December 1857. The chancel was restored in 1877.

The tower and its four bells underwent repair in 1935, after the tower was discovered to be in need of repair in 1908. All bells were retuned and rehung, although one was cracked and had to be replaced. The Emma Barron Trust Fund covered the cost of the bells and the work was carried out by John Taylor & Co of Loughborough. The tower repairs were paid for by the Church Bell Fund and carried out by Messrs. W. Hart and H. Bicknell. The bells were dedicated by the Bishop of Sherborne, the Right Rev. Gerald Allen, on 30 June 1935.

Repairs to the church were carried out in c. 1961 to the designs of Charles William Pike of Dorchester. The Incorporated Church Building Society provided a grant towards the work.

== Architecture ==
St Michael's is built of local rubble stone, partly ashlar-faced, with ashlar dressings. The nave roof is covered with clay tiles and the chancel roof with stone slate. The inside roof-work uses barrel vaulting and includes carved call bosses and stone corbels of angel figures. The church is made up of a nave, chancel, north and south chapels, north vestry, south porch and west tower.

The north and south walls of the nave each have two 15th-century three-light windows. The vestry doorway incorporates older material and the vestry has a reset 15th-century east window. The arch to the north chapel is early 19th-century. The three-stage west tower is 63 feet high. It has a clock and is crowned by an embattled parapet, pinnacles and gargoyles. The weather vanes are believed to be of 18th-century date.

The font has an octagonal bowl and quatrefoil panels of 17th-century date, with the underside and stem dating to the 15th century. The initials N. B., C, W. and the date 1620 is on the rim. The 17th-century pulpit is hexagonal, with moulded framing and enriched cornice. The reader's pew incorporates carved panels and a rail of 17th-century date. The communion table in the north chapel is 17th-century and has enriched top rails. Two of the church's bells are dated 1596 and 1618. Another was made by the Salisbury foundry in the early 16th century. The cracked and unhung bell is of 17th-century date.

=== Monuments ===
The north chapel has a white marble wall-monument to Wyndham Goodden, youngest son of Robert and Abigail Goodden, dated 1839, his wife Mary, dated 1844, which was erected by his eldest son John. The chapel also contains the white marble standing figure of Robert Goodden, which sits on a pedestal in a recess. Other wall monuments are to John Harbin Goodden, eldest son of Robert and Abigail Goodden, dated 1766, and his sisters Elizabeth and Anne, dated 1768. The monument to Robert Goodden, dated 1764, and Abigail, his wife, was erected by their son Robert in 1777. In the south chapel are wall monuments to Onesiphorus Bicknell, dated 1805, and his wife Susanna, dated 1821, erected by Robert Goodden.

The chancel has wall monuments to Charles Abington, dated 1726, and his wife Isabella, dated 1720. There are also floor slabs to Margaret, wife of W. Somers, 17th-century date, to Mary Abington, dated 1599, to George Keate, J.P., dated 1698, and to Barbara, wife of George Abington, dated 1688. The nave has wall monuments to Mary, second daughter of Robert and Abigail Goodden, dated 1812, and Rev. John Culliford Goodden, third son, dated 1813. A brass plaque records six names of local men who gave their lives in World War I. On the wall to the right of the altar is a marble monument to Canon Edward Wyndham Goodden, rector of Nether and Over Compton, who died in 1924. It was made by Laurence Arthur Turner and dedicated by the Bishop of Sherborne, the Right Rev. Robert Abbott, on 25 January 1926.

There are five hatchments in the church, all of 18th or early 19th-century date. In the north chapel is one of Goodden impaling Harbin. The nave contains one of Goodden impaling Harbin, Bishop and Goodden quarterly, Goodden and Bishop quarterly, and Goodden and Culliford quarterly, the latter having a quartered scutcheon of Jeanes.
