= School business manager =

A school business manager (SBM), sometimes known as a school business leader (SBL) or bursar, is a senior member of non-teaching staff responsible for managing non-teaching activity in a school. This position exists in schools in the United Kingdom, but not in most public schools in the United States. They oversee the business management of schools – all the administrative and logistical aspects of running a school so that these are done in the most effective and efficient way possible. Through this, they free up the school's headteacher to focus on leading teaching and learning.

Although generally not in possession of Qualified Teacher Status, SBMs with appropriate training and experience are increasingly serving on the school's leadership team, bringing additional leadership skills and a commercial outlook to the school's strategic decision making. Almost all secondary schools and about a third of primary schools have school business managers serving on their leadership team.

== Duties ==
The SBM role has evolved from that of the school bursar, but whereas bursars typically focus on purely financial administrative matters, SBMs have a broader remit. SBM duties vary from school-to-school and include:

- Financial management, including setting budgets, negotiating contracts with suppliers
- Financial reporting, fundraising and making best use of resources
- Management of support staff, such as teaching assistants, catering staff and cleaners premises management
- Human resources, including overseeing staff training strategic planning, including meeting long-term education challenges and developments, such as the Every Child Matters Agenda
- Health and safety
- Relationship management with other schools and external partners

In secondary schools – or where groups of schools are working together in a cluster or federation – SBMs will often have a broader, more strategic role, with some functions delegated to administrative support staff. In primary schools, an SBM may have an even more hands-on role, spending time on detailed administrative and financial tasks.

The SBM position is still evolving, with higher-level, more strategic roles, such as Advanced School Business Managers and School Business Directors, emerging. The potential of these is being tested through a series of demonstration projects.

The profession required a set of standards like that of other professional professions. The National Association of School Business Management (NASBM) have launched a set of professional standards available via the following link: - this project will soon link to future new qualifications.

== Qualifications ==
School business managers can study for a number of professional qualifications through the National College for School Leadership and its School Business Manager Development Programme. These qualifications are the Certificate of School Business Management (CSBM), the Diploma of School Business Management (DSBM), and the Advanced Diploma of School Business management launched in March 2008. The senior course, the School Business Director's Course (SBD), was launched in 2010 and lasts around 18 months. They are delivered through a series of cohorts during the year, using a mixture of face-to-face residential elements, self-directed study and e-learning. The qualifications are internationally accredited by the Institute of Administrative Management. * Now called the National College for Teaching and Leadership (NCTL).

Note that the National College for Teaching and Leadership (formerly the National College for School Leadership) based in Nottingham, England, ceased its direct involvement with school business management training in 2014/15. However, SBM programmes continue to be offered by various other providers, including those originally commissioned by the NCTL. Refer to the NASBM web site accredited SBM programmes.

The Institute of School Business Leadership (formerly the National Association of School Business Management) is the UK's leading association working exclusively on behalf of the school business management profession.

Many providers, such as School Business Services and SAAF Education, provide a range of school and academy professional services which include support to school business managers, and interim cover when there is an absence or vacancy
