= Rhys Rhys-Williams =

Welsh politician (1865–1955)

Sir Rhys Rhys-Williams DSO QC DL
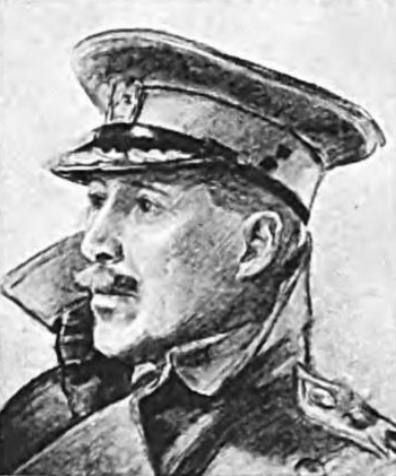

Member of Parliament for Banbury
- In office 1918–1922
- Preceded by: Eustace Fiennes
- Succeeded by: James Edmondson

Personal details
- Born: 20 October 1865
- Died: 29 January 1955 (aged 89)
- Party: Liberal Party
- Spouse: Juliet Glyn (m. 1921)
- Children: 4
- Education: Eton College
- Alma mater: Oriel College, Oxford

Military service
- Allegiance: United Kingdom
- Branch/service: British Army
- Rank: Lieutenant Colonel
- Unit: Welsh Guards

Sir Rhys Rhys-Williams, 1st Baronet, DSO, QC, DL (20 October 1865 – 29 January 1955), born Rhys Williams, was a British Liberal Party politician from Wales. He later left the Liberal Party for the Conservatives.

== Family ==
Rhys-Williams was the son of Judge Gwilym Williams and Emma Eleanor Williams JP. His wife Juliet Rhys-Williams (née Glyn) was a writer and prominent Liberal politician who, like her husband, later joined the Conservative Party via the Liberal Nationals. They met in 1919 when Juliet Glyn began working for Rhys-Williams as his private secretary during his period of office as parliamentary secretary at the Ministry of Transport. They married on 24 February 1921. They had two sons and two daughters. Their son, Sir Brandon Rhys-Williams became a Conservative MP and Member of the European Parliament.

== Education ==
Rhys-Williams was educated at Eton College, which he entered in 1880, and Oriel College, Oxford.

== Military service ==
In the First World War he served in the Welsh Guards, reaching the rank of lieutenant-colonel. He saw active service, was wounded, was twice mentioned in dispatches and won the DSO. In 1915 he served for a year as Acting Military Attaché at the British Legation in Tehran. He ran an intelligence service for the Russians in their campaigns against the Turks and was awarded the Order of St. Vladimir with the Swords by the Czar in 1916. In 1917 Rhys-Williams was attached the War Office to act as Assistant Director-General Movements and Railways.

== Legal career ==
Williams was called to the Bar at the Inner Temple in 1890 and joined the South Wales Circuit. He also practised in the Parliamentary Committee Rooms. He took silk in 1913. In 1906 Rhys-Williams became Chairman of Quarter Sessions in Glamorgan in succession to his father. From 1922, Rhys-Williams served as Recorder of Cardiff.

== Politics ==
Williams was first returned to Parliament as Member of Parliament (MP) for Banbury at a by-election in September 1918 and was returned unopposed at the 1918 general election as Coalition Liberal. On his appointment as Recorder of Cardiff he was obliged to resign from Parliament and fight a by-election on 22 June but he was again returned unopposed. He served on until the 1922 general election when he stood in a different seat and was defeated.

General election 1922: Pontypridd
Party	Candidate	Votes	%	±%
Labour	Thomas Mardy-Jones	14,884	47.2	+3.4
National Liberal	Rhys Rhys-Williams	8,667	27.5	N/A
Unionist	J. Griffith Jones	7,994	25.4	N/A
Majority		6,217	19.7	N/A
Turnout		31,545	76.8	+8.5
Registered electors		41,087		
Labour hold		Swing		

In 1919 Rhys-Williams was appointed parliamentary secretary to the Ministry of Transport under the direction of the Minister of Transport Sir Eric Geddes. However he soon fell out with Geddes and resigned just two months after being appointed.

In 1923, Rhys-Williams was approached by the Aberavon Liberal Association to stand as their candidate in the forthcoming general election in opposition to Labour leader Ramsay MacDonald but he declined. By the 1930s, Rhys-Williams had become more anti-socialist in stance. Never a great party man, in March 1931 he tried to get the Liberal candidate at the by-election at Pontypridd, Captain G Crawshay, to make a public statement that as soon as the Labour government introduced what he described as any openly socialist measure he would vote to try to turn out the government. Rhys-Williams promised Crawshay that if he would make this pledge he would do his best to get the Conservatives to stand aside and support him in a straight fight against Labour. When Crawshay refused to agree Rhys-Williams came out in support of David Evans, the Conservative candidate in the by-election. In the event the seat was easily retained by Labour, with Crawshay in second place and Evans third.

== Baronetcy ==
Rhys-Williams was created a Baronet in June 1918, shortly before entering Parliament. After his death, the baronetcy was inherited by his son Brandon Rhys-Williams, who later served for over twenty years as a Conservative MP.

== Miskin Manor ==
Williams inherited his father's estate in Wales, Miskin Manor in Glamorgan, after which his baronetcy was named. In 1923 the manor house was partly consumed by fire which destroyed the south wing. In 1940 the manor house was taken over by the Red Cross and used as a convalescent home. Lady Williams was commandant of the Red Cross Hospital there and continued to occupy part of the building, giving the manor as her home address when writing to The Times in 1943. The manor was then passed from the Red Cross to the local health authority in 1948 for continued use as a hospital. This arrangement later caused Sir Rhys some distress in old age and he lodged a formal protest at the actions of the Pontypridd and Rhondda Hospital Committee, claiming they had deprived him of the use of the house for six years and had paid only the sum £1 4s in rent during this period. Sir Rhys alleged that the hospital committee were now refusing to buy the house, having previously agreed to do. However the hospital was expensive to run and the Hospital Management Committee gave notice they were going to close it and that it was not economic to buy the manor. Lady Williams continued to occupy the manor after her husband's death in 1955.

Sir Rhys served as the first President of Llantrisant and Pontyclun Golf Club, formed in 1927.

== Death ==
Rhys-Williams died in London aged 89 years on 29 January 1955.

Parliament of the United Kingdom
Preceded by Eustace Fiennes	Member of Parliament for Banbury; 1918–1922	Succeeded by James Edmondson
Baronetage of the United Kingdom
New creation	Baronet (of Miskin); 1918–1955	Succeeded by Brandon Rhys-Williams
