= Alain Robert =

French rock and urban climber (born 1962)

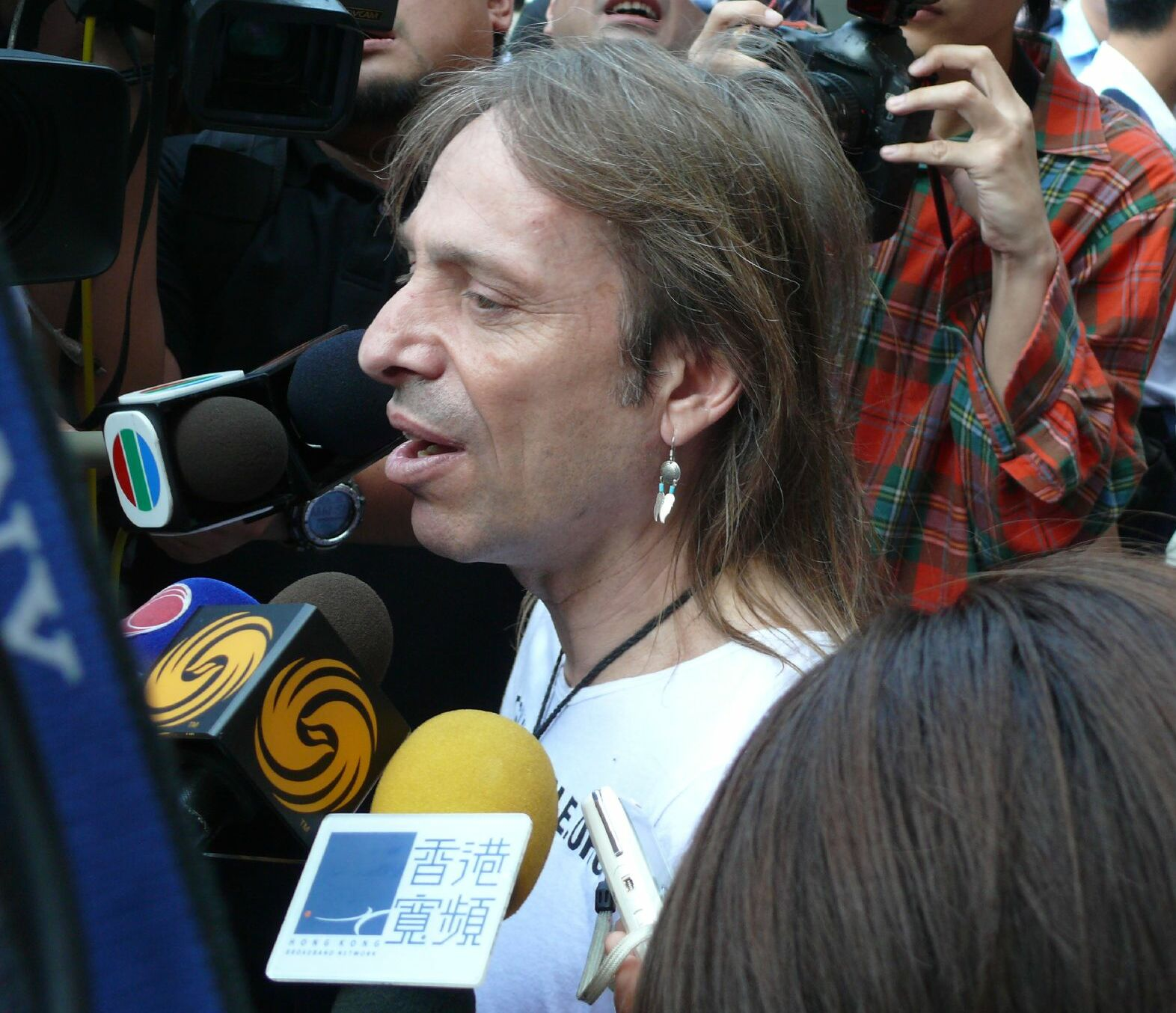
- Robert in 2008

Personal information
- Other names: French Spider-Man
- Born: Robert Alain Philippe; 7 August 1962 (age 64) Digoin, France
- Occupation: Professional rock climber
- Height: 1.65 m (5 ft 5 in)
- Website: alainrobert.com

Climbing career
- Type of climber: Buildering; Free solo climbing; Sport climbing
- Highest grade: Redpoint: 8b (5.13d); Free solo: 8b (5.13d)
- Known for: Scaling skyscrapers

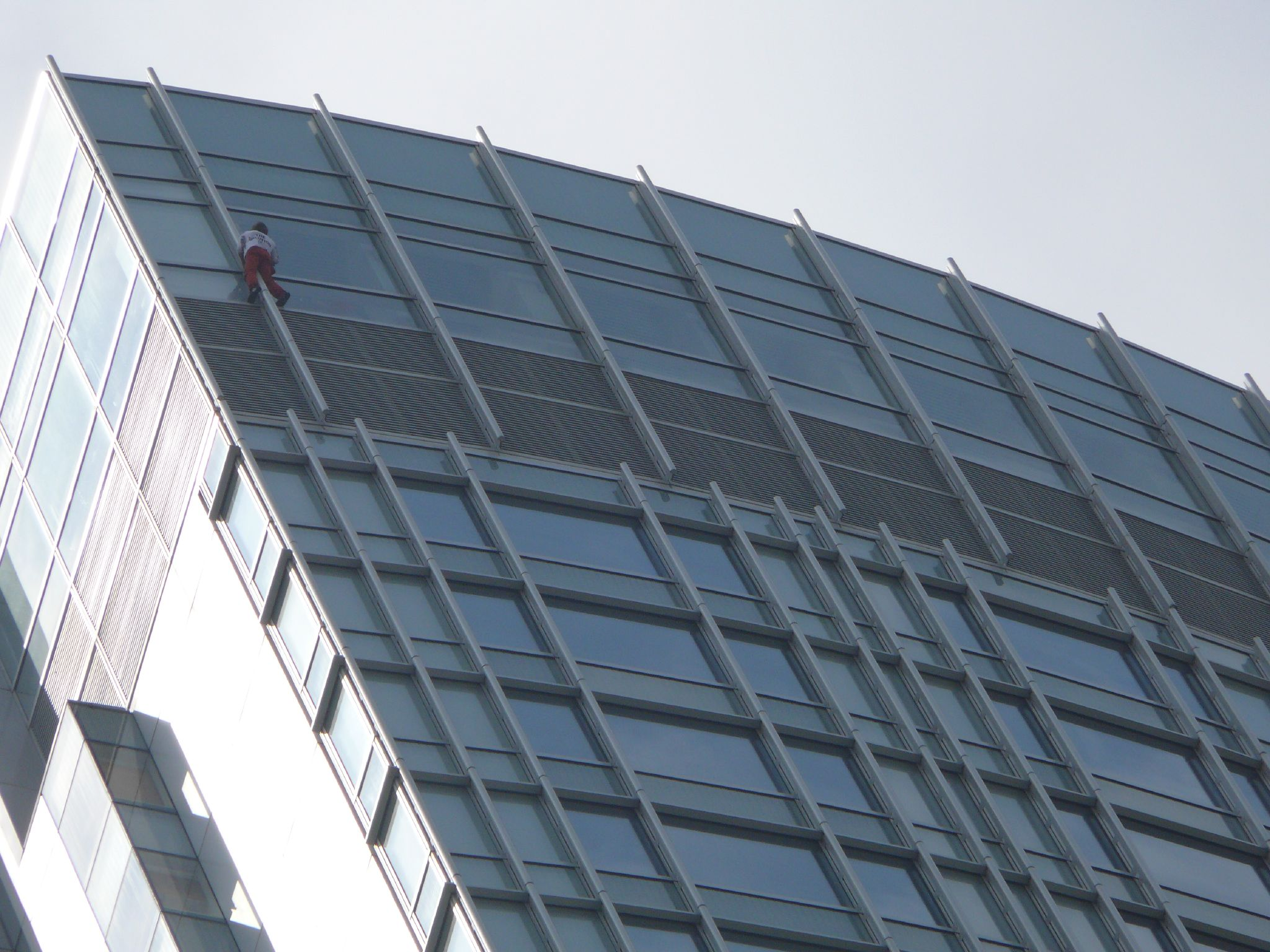
Robert climbing the Four Seasons Hotel Hong Kong in 2008

Alain Robert (French pronunciation: [alɛ̃ ʁɔbɛʁ]; born Alain Philippe Robert; 7 August 1962) is a French rock climber and urban climber. Nicknamed "the French Spider-Man" or "the Human Spider", Robert carries out free solo climbs of skyscrapers using no climbing equipment except for a small bag of chalk and a pair of climbing shoes.

Authorities do not typically grant him permission to climb many of the buildings he has ascended, but Robert has managed to evade security and access these structures surreptitiously. As a result, he has been arrested numerous times in various countries by law enforcement officials waiting for him at the end of his climb. However, he has also completed some climbs with permission and sponsorship.

== Strategy ==
Robert's rock-climbing physical training and technique allow him to climb using the small protrusions of building walls and windows (such as window ledges and frames). Many of his climbs provide him no opportunity to rest and can last several hours. He sometimes has a small bag of climbing chalk powder fastened around his waist.

== Career ==
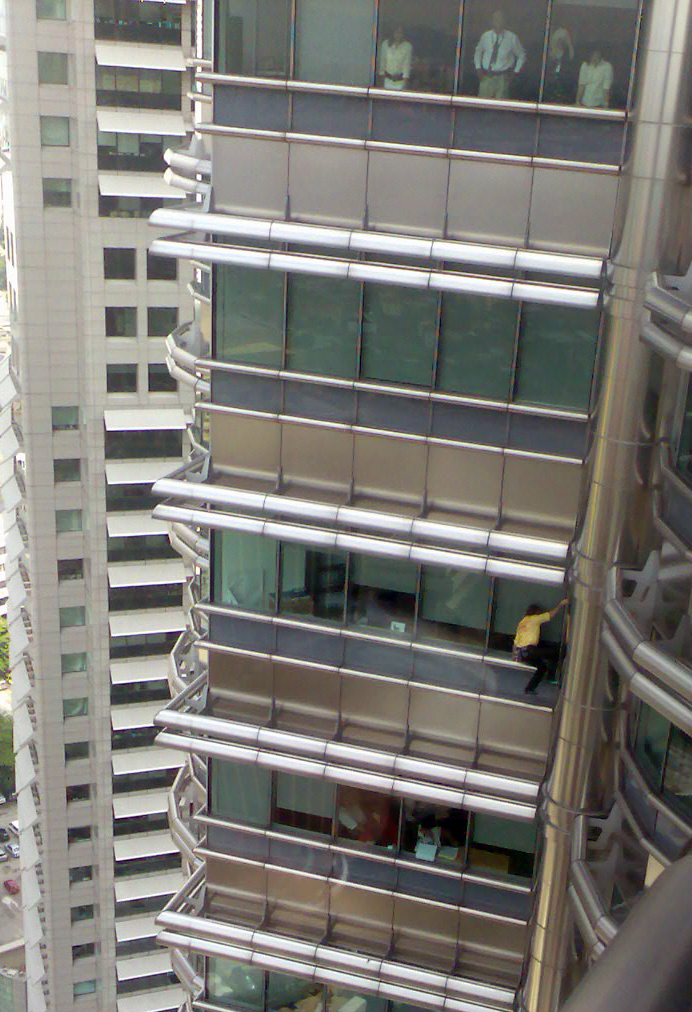
Robert climbing Petronas Tower 2 in March 2007

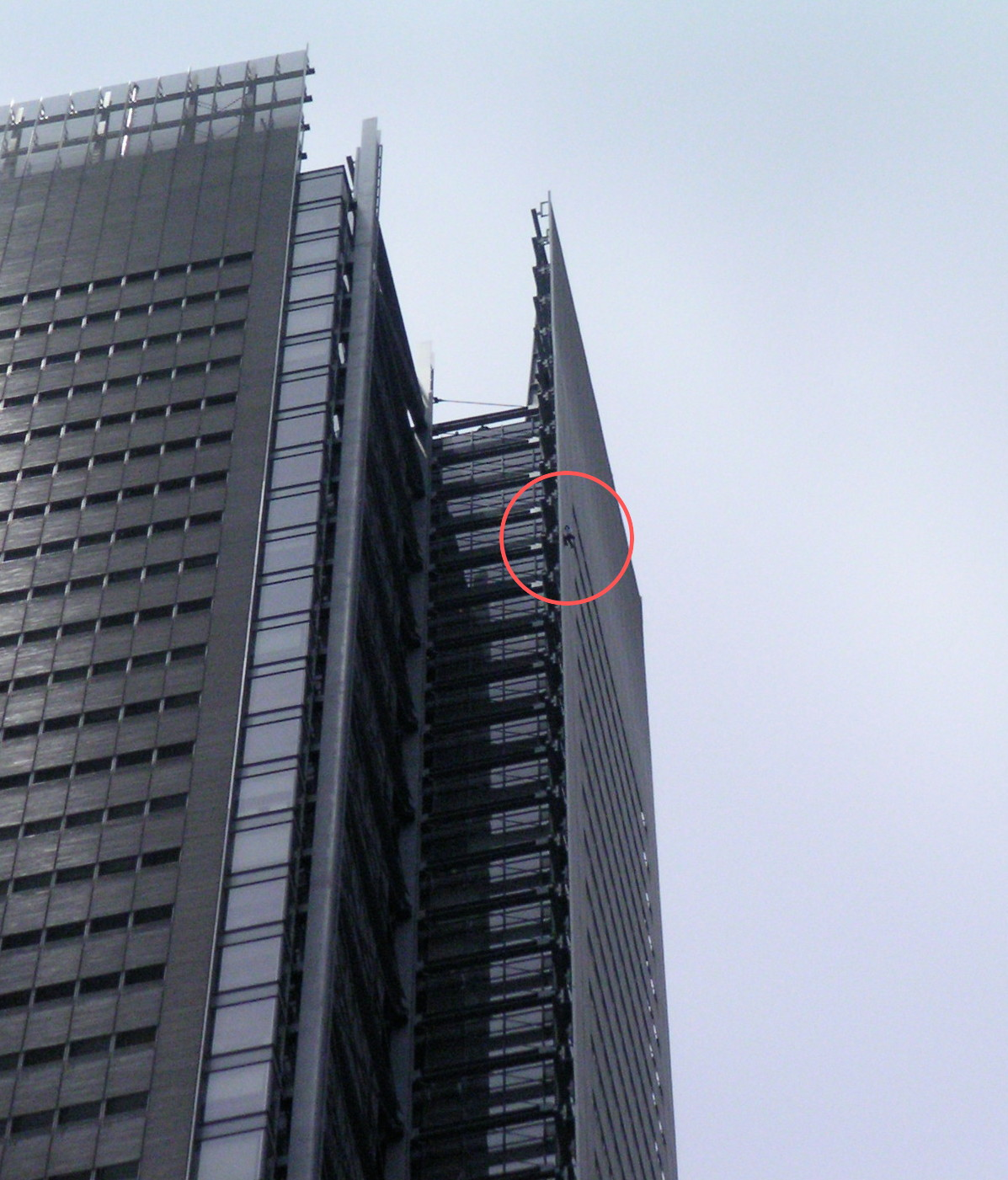
Robert climbing The New York Times Building on 5 June 2008

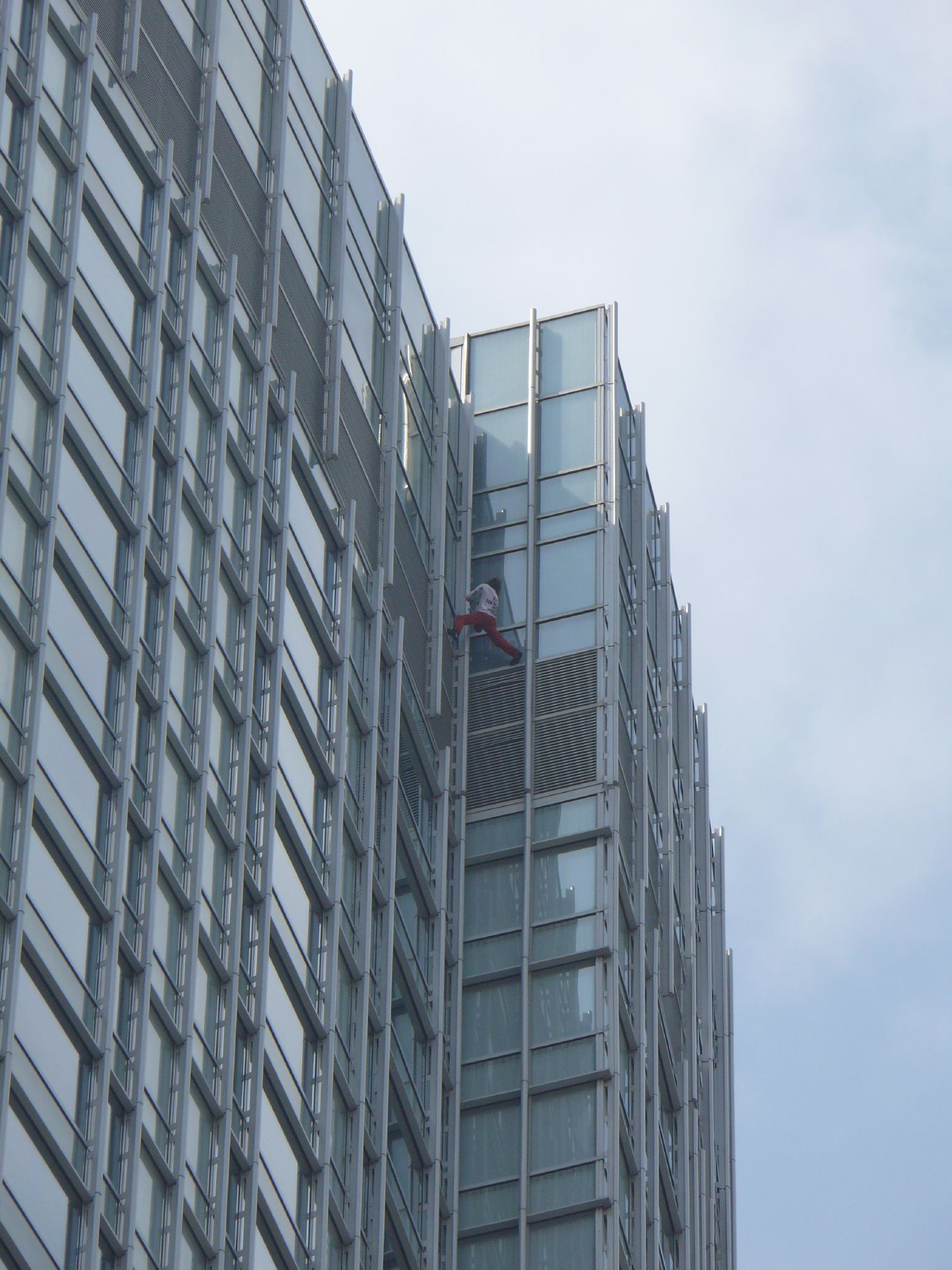
Robert on top of Four Seasons Hotel Hong Kong, 2008

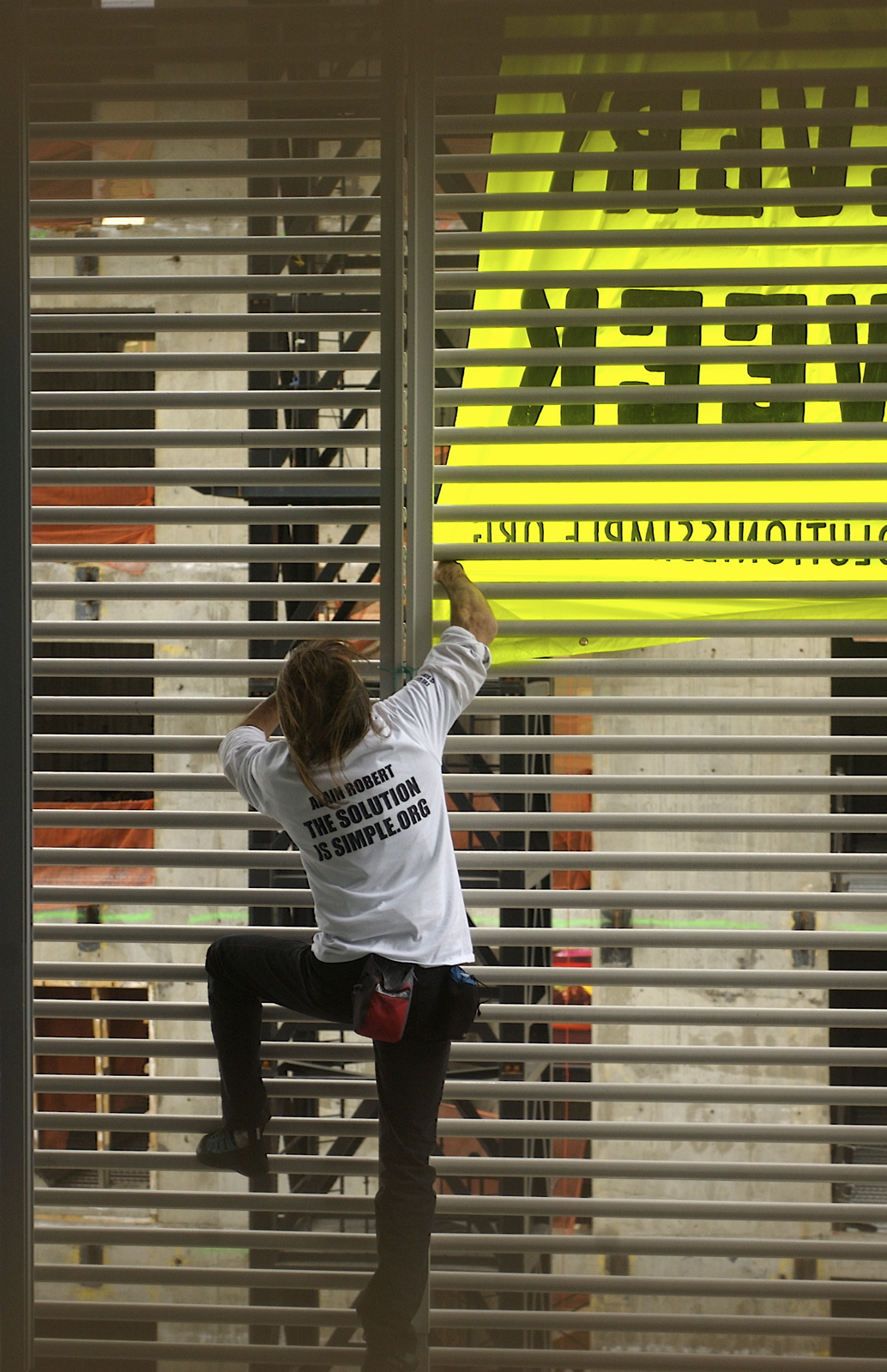
During ascent of the New York Times Building in 2008, Robert hangs Global warming kills more people than 9/11 every week banner.

Robert has climbed landmarks including the Burj Khalifa, Eiffel Tower, the Sydney Opera House and the Montparnasse Tower, as well as other of the world's tallest skyscrapers, most of them performed free solo.

=== 1990s ===
In July 1994, he climbed the Citibank Citicorp Center.

On 20 March 1997, he climbed the Petronas Twin Towers in Kuala Lumpur, Malaysia but was arrested at the 60th floor, 28 floors below the top.

On 16 April 1998, he climbed the 23-metre (75 ft) high Luxor Obelisk in Paris.

In June 1999, Robert climbed the 170-metre (558 ft) Marriott Hotel in Warsaw.

On 20 August 1999, he climbed the Sears Tower, the second man to do so after Dan Goodwin. However, Robert performed the climb with no equipment other than a chalk bag and shoes, while Goodwin used suction cups and sky hooks, wearing a homemade Spider-Man suit.

=== 2000s ===
On 21 February 2003, he legally climbed the 200-metre (656 ft) National Bank of Abu Dhabi, UAE, watched by about 100,000 spectators. It became more frequent for Robert to be paid to scale buildings as part of publicity efforts.

On 12 May 2003, he was paid approximately $18,000 to climb the 95-metre (312 ft) Lloyd's building to promote the premiere of the movie Spider-Man on the British television channel Sky Movies.

On 19 October 2004, he scaled the 187-metre (614 ft) headquarters of the French oil company Total while wearing a Spider-Man costume.

On 25 December 2004, Robert scaled Taipei 101 a few days before its grand opening as the tallest building in the world. The 508-metre (1,667 ft) climb was legal, part of the week's festivities. The skyscraper's outwardly slanting sides posed no apparent difficulty for him, but heavy rain resulted in a climb lasting four hours—double his estimate.

On 11 June 2005, he climbed the Cheung Kong Centre in Hong Kong, scaling 283 metres (928 ft) to reach the top of the 62-story tower.

On 1 September 2006, he climbed the tallest building in Lithuania and the Baltic States – Europa Tower, 148 metres (486 ft), in Vilnius. Wearing a black suit and using a safety rope, which he detached several times, he reached the observation deck of the building, 114 metres (374 ft), in 40 minutes.

In 2006 he also climbed Torre Vasco da Gama in Portugal as part of an advertisement for Optimus, a national mobile operator. In 2007, he climbed the 25 de Abril Bridge but was arrested.

On 7 December 2006, he finished the year climbing the Santa Fe World Plaza in Mexico City.

On 23 February 2007, he legally climbed the headquarters building of Abu Dhabi Investment Authority (ADIA) on the coast of Abu Dhabi.

On 20 March 2007, he again climbed the Petronas Twin Towers, marking the tenth anniversary of his previous ascent of this building. Upon reaching the 60th floor, he allowed himself to be apprehended. He flew the Malaysian flag and drew applause from waiting police, fire crew and media representatives before handing himself in. He was handcuffed and escorted off the premises before being driven to a police station.

On 31 May 2007, he scaled the 88-story Jin Mao Building in Shanghai, China's then-tallest building, once again wearing a Spider-Man costume. He was subsequently arrested and jailed for five days before being expelled from China.

On 4 September 2007, he climbed the 244-metre (801 ft) Federation Tower office building in Moscow, Russia's tallest skyscraper. He was detained by police afterwards.

On 18 November 2007, Robert climbed the 1,518-metre (4,980 ft) Tianmen mountain despite initially being banned from China for five years earlier in May, after being invited by the local government of Zhangjiajie, a scenic region in the southern province of Hunan, to boost the profile of the region and bring in tourists.

On 18 December 2007, he climbed the 29-story Portland House office building in London (Westminster's tallest building). It took him just over 40 minutes. Police taped off the area and later arrested him for criminal damage and wasting police time.

On 15 April 2008, he climbed the 60-story Four Seasons Place in Hong Kong. The police and four fire engines were standing by and it took him almost 1 hour to reach the top. He stated that his climb was intended to increase awareness of global warming.

On 5 June 2008, he climbed the New York Times Building in New York City. He unfurled a banner with a slogan about global warming and was then arrested by police on the roof. The banner read "Global warming kills more people than 9/11 every week". On the same day a second person, Renaldo Clarke, also climbed the Times Building.

On 17 February 2009, he once again climbed the Cheung Kong Centre in Hong Kong, taking 40 minutes to reach the top of the 62-story tower. He unfurled a banner reading "onehundredmonths.org" while climbing.

On 2 April 2009, during the 2009 G-20 London summit, he climbed to the 9th floor of the Lloyd's building and unfurled a 33-metre banner declaring that there were 100 months left to save the planet.

On 2 June 2009, he climbed to the 41st floor of the RBS Tower in Sydney, Australia before returning to the ground. He was arrested as he finished his descent.

On 1 September 2009, one day after Malaysia celebrated its 52nd Independence Day and after two arrests in 1997 and 2007, Alain Robert finally made it successfully to the top of the Petronas Twin Towers. He started at 6:00 am local time and reached the top at 7:40 am local time without attracting the attention of the public. He celebrated his climb by standing with his arms outspread on the pinnacle of one of the Twin Towers. He was later fined RM2000 in default of two months jail at the Kuala Lumpur magistrate's court after he pleaded guilty to criminal trespass for scaling the Petronas Twin Towers.

=== 2010s ===
On 28 March 2011, Robert climbed the tallest building in the world, the 828-meter Burj Khalifa tower in Dubai, taking just over six hours to complete the climb. However, he used a harness in accordance with safety procedure.

On 4 September 2011, he legally climbed the 240-meter tall central tower of Moscow State University, during a 2-hour 4D show by David Atkins, in which the university was used as a projection screen.

On 14 October 2011, he climbed the InterContinental Bucharest in Romania.

On 12 April 2012, he set a Guinness World Record for climbing the 300m-high Aspire Tower in Doha, Qatar in the fastest time (1 hour, 33 minutes and 47 seconds).

On 21 June 2012, he legally climbed the 110-metre high Mauritius Telecom Tower in Mauritius as part of an advertising campaign for the launching of 4G cellular technology by the telecommunications operator. He was aided by safety ropes, harnesses and suction cups.

In November 2012, Robert was spotted inside The Shard in London. The building's owners subsequently obtained an injunction preventing Robert from ever returning.

On 27 March 2014, he climbed the Tour Ariane outside Paris in 45 minutes. Onlookers and police gathered to watch his climb. He was arrested by police and later released without being charged.

On 12 April 2015, he climbed the Cayan Tower in Dubai, a 307-meter tall twisted building, in 70 minutes.

On 23 April 2016, he climbed the Esentai Tower in Almaty, Kazakhstan. The Esentai Tower is the second highest building in Kazakhstan; it is 162 meters tall and is used as the Ritz Carlton Hotel and for offices.

On 25 November 2016, he climbed the Torre Agbar, a 38-storey skyscraper in Barcelona, Spain.

On 6 June 2018, he climbed the Lotte World Tower, a 123-storey skyscraper in Seoul, South Korea.

On 25 October 2018, he climbed the Heron Tower, a 46-storey skyscraper in London.

On 29 January 2019, he climbed the G.T. International Tower, a 181-meter tall skyscraper in Makati, Metro Manila, Philippines. He was arrested upon finishing his descent.

On 16 August 2019, he once again climbed the Cheung Kong Centre in Hong Kong. He hung a banner with the Hong Kong and China flags above a handshake near the top of the building.

On 28 September 2019, he climbed the Skyper building, a 153-meter tall skyscraper in Frankfurt. He was arrested upon finishing his descent.

=== 2020s ===
On 1 October 2020, he climbed the 166m tall Silberturm (Silver Tower) in Frankfurt.

On 23 November 2021, he once again climbed the Skyper building in Frankfurt, before being arrested by German authorities.

On 17 September 2022, he once again climbed the Tour Total in Paris, to celebrate his 60th birthday. He wanted to prove that "being 60 is nothing. You can still do sport, be active, do fabulous things."

On 5 March 2024, he again climbed the G.T. International Tower in Makati, Metro Manila, Philippines, to show support for the country in the territorial disputes in the South China Sea. He was then again arrested by the Makati City Police upon finishing his descent. Despite claiming he was mistreated by the Police, the authorities denied being harsh on him, and clarified that they're not allowed to give him any special treatment even if he's familiar. However, Philippine netizens' comments on social media were overwhelmingly positive and were actually in awe of his stunt, with the majority even being thankful for performing his act with a geopolitically relevant motivation.

== Notable climbs ==
The table below contains the notable structures climbed by Alain Robert.

Location	Building	Date	Height	Notes
Sydney, Australia	Sydney Tower	1997	319 metres (1,047 ft)	
Sydney, Australia	Sydney Opera House	1997	65 metres (213 ft)	
Sydney, Australia	Sydney Harbour Bridge	1997	135 metres (443 ft)	
Sydney, Australia	RBS Tower	2 June 2009	218 metres (715 ft)	Descended to ground. Arrested and fined A$750
Sydney, Australia	Lumiere building	30 August 2010	151 metres (495 ft)	Arrested at the top. Took about 20 minutes to climb the 57-story building
Rio de Janeiro, Brazil	Hotel Vermont	1996		
Montreal, Canada	Crown Plaza Hotel	1999	120 metres (390 ft)	
Montreal, Canada	Place de la Cathédrale		146 metres (479 ft)	
Hong Kong	Four Seasons Hotel	2008	130 metres (430 ft)	
Hong Kong	Far East Finance Centre	1996	200 metres (660 ft)	
Hong Kong	The Cullinan	2015	270 metres (890 ft)	
Hong Kong	The Cheung Kong Centre	2005	283 metres (928 ft)	
Hong Kong	The Cheung Kong Centre	2009	283 metres (928 ft)	
Tianmen Mountain, China	Heaven's Gate	2007	200 metres (660 ft)	A plaque commemorates his feat
London, England	One Canada Square	18 October 2002	244 metres (801 ft)	Abandoned halfway due to rain
London, England	One Canada Square	1995	244 metres (801 ft)	
London, England	Lloyd's building	2 April 2009	95 metres (312 ft)	Climbed to the 9th floor. Unfurled a 100 ft banner.
London, England	Portland House	18 December 2007	101 metres (331 ft)	Arrested. 40-minute climb.
Paris, France	Eiffel Tower	1996/97	313 metres (1,027 ft)	
Paris, France	Grande Arche at La Défense	1999	105 metres (344 ft)	Failed due to heat, rescued by firemen
Paris, France	The Luxor Obelisk in Place de la Concorde	1998	31 metres (102 ft)	
Paris, France	Tour Montparnasse	1995	209 metres (686 ft)	
Paris, France	Tour Crystal at Front de Seine	2005	100 metres (330 ft)	
Paris, France	Tour Crystal at Front de Seine	1996	100 metres (330 ft)	
São Paulo, Brazil	FIESP (Luís Eulálio de Bueno Vidigal Filho)	1996	92 metres (302 ft)	Arrested on top
Paris, France	Mercurial Towers at Bagnolet	1995	125 metres (410 ft)	
Paris, France	Tour Total	19 October 2004	187 metres (614 ft)	Wore a Spider-Man costume
Paris, France	Tour Total	20 March 2014	187 metres (614 ft)	
Paris, France	Ariane building	8 October 2009	152 metres (499 ft)	No formal charges were brought against him
Frankfurt, Germany	Dresdner Bank Tower	1995	145 metres (476 ft)	
Milan, Italy	Banca di Milano building	1995	112 metres (367 ft)	
Tokyo, Japan	Shinjuku Center Building	1998	245 metres (804 ft)	
Warsaw, Poland	Marriott Hotel	1999	140 metres (460 ft)	
Johannesburg, South Africa	IBM Tower	1998	110 metres (360 ft)	
Abu Dhabi, UAE	National Bank of Abu Dhabi	Feb 2003	173 metres (568 ft)	A legal climb. Watched by about 100,000 spectators.
Abu Dhabi, UAE	The Etisalat building	2005	160 metres (520 ft)	
Abu Dhabi, UAE	ADIA Headquarters Building	2007	185 metres (607 ft)	
New York City, United States	New York Times Building	5 June 2008	228 metres (748 ft)	Unfurled global warming banner. Arrested by police.
New York City, United States	Empire State Building	1994	381 metres (1,250 ft)	
Chicago, United States	Willis Tower	1999	443 metres (1,453 ft)	Arrested on top
Chicago, United States	Citigroup Center (Chicago)	July 1994	180 metres (590 ft)	Arrested on top
San Francisco, United States	Golden Gate Bridge	1996	227 metres (745 ft)	Arrested upon completing descent
Philadelphia, United States	Blue Cross Tower	1997	185 metres (607 ft)	
Las Vegas, United States	Luxor Hotel	1996	106 metres (348 ft)	
Tampere, Finland	Hotel Ilves	2003	61 metres (200 ft)	
Kuala Lumpur, Malaysia	Petronas Tower 1	20 March 1997	452 metres (1,483 ft)	Arrested at the 60th floor
Kuala Lumpur, Malaysia	Petronas Tower 2	20 March 2007	452 metres (1,483 ft)	Arrested at the 60th floor
Kuala Lumpur, Malaysia	Petronas Towers	1 September 2009	452 metres (1,483 ft)	Stood atop the highest point of the tower, fined MYR 2000
Kota Kinabalu, Sabah, Malaysia	Sabah Foundation Building	1997	122 metres (400 ft)	
Kuala Lumpur, Malaysia	Melia Hotel	1997	80 metres (260 ft)	For fundraising
Singapore	Overseas Union Bank Centre	2000	280 metres (920 ft)	Arrested at the 21st floor
Singapore	Suntec Tower One	2008	176 metres (577 ft)	
Taipei, Taiwan	Taipei 101	2004	508 metres (1,667 ft)	Climbed as part of opening event. Tallest building in the world at the time of ascent.
Caracas, Venezuela	Parque Central Torre	2002	224 metres (735 ft)	
Barcelona, Spain	Torre Agbar	2007	144 metres (472 ft)	
Barcelona, Spain	Torre Agbar	2006	144 metres (472 ft)	
Lisbon, Portugal	Torre Vasco da Gama	2006	145 metres (476 ft)	Optimus-sponsored legal climb to promote a phone.
Lisbon, Portugal	25 de Abril Bridge	6 August 2007	190 metres (620 ft)	Arrested
Mexico City, Mexico	Santa Fé World Plaza Corporate Tower	2006	127 metres (417 ft)	
Bratislava, Slovakia	Slovak Radio Building	12 April 2007	80 metres (260 ft)	Took less than 20 minutes
Shanghai, China	Jin Mao Building	31 May 2007	420 metres (1,380 ft)	Arrested, expelled from China
Moscow, Russia	West Federation Tower	4 September 2007	244 metres (801 ft)	Detained by police.
São Paulo, Brazil	Edifício Itália	February 2008	168 metres (551 ft)	
Beirut, Lebanon	Phoenicia Hotel	October 2008	90 metres (300 ft)	Legal climb with safety harness, promotion for Gillette.
Jakarta, Indonesia	The City Tower	12 November 2008	150 metres (490 ft)	
Jakarta, Indonesia	Bakrie Tower	26 March 2012	214 metres (702 ft)	
Pune, India	The Amanora Tower	28 February 2010	100 metres (330 ft)	Took less than 12 minutes
Paris, France	GDF Suez building	7 April 2010	185 metres (607 ft)	Arrested at the top
Singapore	Singapore Flyer	5 November 2010	165 metres (541 ft)	First person to climb around the world's tallest observatory wheel.
Dubai, UAE	Burj Khalifa	28 March 2011	828 metres (2,717 ft)	Legal climb, partial use of safety harness. Tallest building in the world at the time of ascent.
Doha, Qatar	Aspire Tower	12 April 2012	300 metres (980 ft)	Set a Guinness World Record for climbing in the fastest time (1 hour, 33 minutes and 47 seconds)
Paris, France	Tour First	10 May 2012	231 metres (758 ft)	
Port Louis, Mauritius	Mauritius Telecom Tower	21 June 2012	110 metres (360 ft)	Legal climb, took less than 30 minutes.
Moscow, Russia	Mail.ru office Tower	29 August 2013	109 metres (358 ft)	Legal climb, took less than 30 minutes.
Auckland, New Zealand	Metropolis Residences	12 December 2013	155 metres (509 ft)	Legal climb, promotion for Samsung Galaxy Gear.
Yekaterinburg, Russia	Vysotsky	24 September 2014	188 metres (617 ft)	Legal climb, promotion for Sinara Group
Seoul, South Korea	Lotte World Tower	6 June 2018	555 metres (1,821 ft)	Arrested.
Makati, Philippines	G.T. International Tower (skyscraper)	29 January 2019	217 metres (712 ft)	Arrested.
Makati, Philippines	G.T. International Tower (skyscraper)	5 March 2024	217 metres (712 ft)	Arrested.
Hong Kong	The Cheung Kong Centre	2019	283 metres (928 ft)	
Frankfurt, Germany	Skyper building	2019/21	153 metres (502 ft)	Detained
Barcelona, Spain	Torre Agbar	2020	144 metres (472 ft)	Detained and fined
Dubai, UAE	Burj Khalifa	20 November 2023	828 metres (2,717 ft)	Legal climb alongside Alexis Landot. Promoting Mashreq's "Climb2Change" initiative.

== Accidents ==
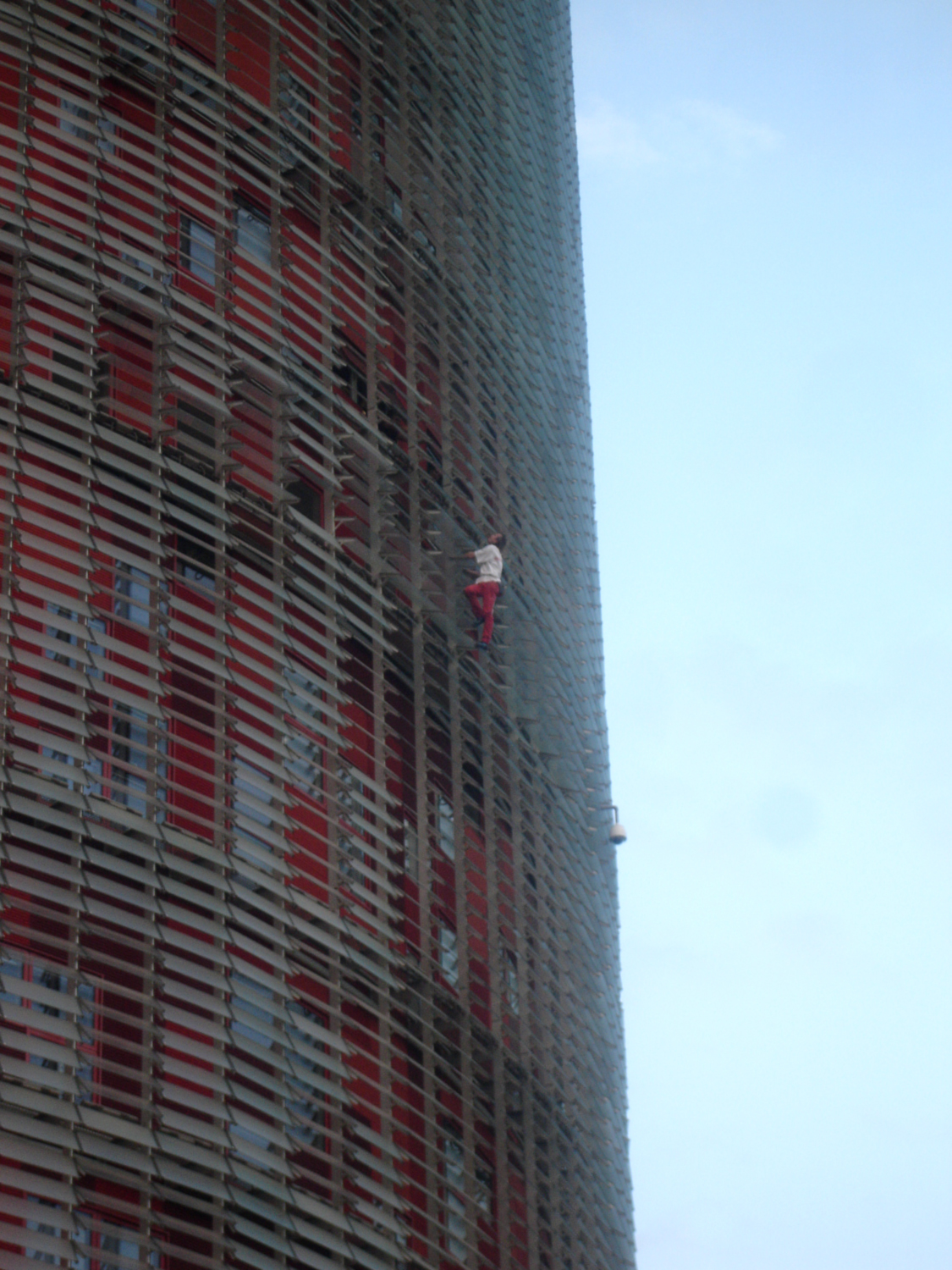
Robert climbing Torre Agbar in Barcelona, 2007

In a 2005 interview, Robert said that he has fallen seven times in his life. The worst was his fall in September 1982.

On 18 January 1982, at 19, he fell 15 metres (49 ft) when his anchor and rope gave way during training. He fractured his wrists, heels and nose and underwent three operations.

On 29 September 1982, at 20, he fell 15 metres (49 ft) when his rope came undone while abseiling. He was in a coma for five days and fractured both forearms, his elbow, pelvis and nose. His elbow was also dislocated and a nerve was damaged, leaving him partially paralyzed. He also suffered cerebral edema and vertigo. He underwent six operations on his hands and elbow.

In 1993, he fell 8 metres (26 ft) while showing students how to rely on their legs when climbing. He kept his hands behind his back on an easy route but lost his balance and fell headfirst, shattering both wrists. He went into another coma and spent two months in the hospital.

In 2004, he fell 2 metres (6,5 ft) when climbing a traffic light whilst posing for a photo in an interview. He landed on his elbow and needed forty stitches; just one month later he climbed the world's tallest skyscraper at the time, Taipei 101, as part of its official opening week.

== Books and documentaries ==
Robert's autobiography, With Bare Hands, was first published in English in 2008. It features his development into a famous urban climber from his days as a child and gives a deep insight into his philosophy and how he managed to overcome his disabilities.

The book was released for the Asian market in April by Blacksmith Books in Hong Kong with the subtitle "The true story of Alain Robert, the real-life Spiderman" (ISBN 9789889979928). In September it was released by Maverick House Publishers in the UK for the English language market across Europe. This edition has the subtitle "The Story of the Human Spider" (ISBN 9781905379552).

There is a 52-minute documentary about Robert titled The Wall Crawler by Director/Producer Julie Cohen, released in 1998.

The Channel 4 series Cutting Edge covered Robert in an episode entitled The Human Spider in April 2008.

== Awards ==
- Faust Challenger of the Year (2011), Japan

== See also ==
- Harry Gardiner
- Dan Goodwin
- Ivan Kristoff
- Philippe Petit
- Owen Quinn
- George Willig
