= Street magic =

Genre of magic performance

Street magic falls into two genres; traditional street performance and guerrilla magic.

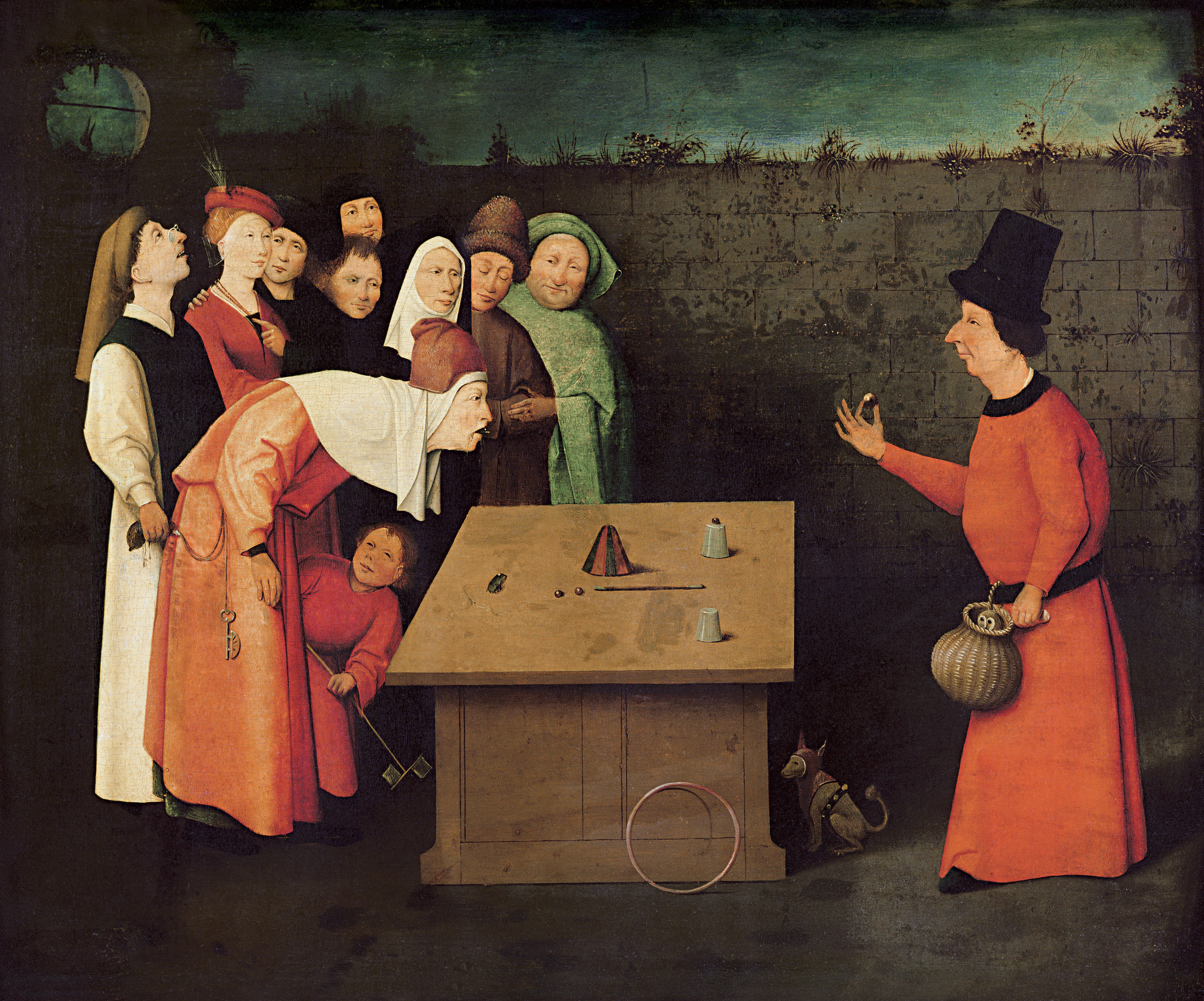
Hieronymus Bosch: The Conjurer, 1475–1480

== Traditional street performance ==
The first definition of street magic refers to a traditional form of magic performance – that of busking. In this, the magician draws an audience from passers by and performs an entire act for them. In exchange, the magician seeks remuneration either by having a receptacle for tips available throughout the act (known in the parlance as a "trickle show"), or by offering a receptacle for tips at the end of the show. The term "passing the hat" comes from the practice of having the hat passed before the final trick is performed, as opposed to "bottling" the audience at the end of the performance.

Street magic most often consists of what has been referred to in the past as "hand" or "pocket" magic, sleight of hand. Whether card magic or magic performed with coins, balls, scarves, or rope, even occasionally mentalism, regardless of the props involved, the ability to draw and hold an audience is cited by contemporary practitioners as a skill of greater importance than the illusions themselves.

The famous Indian Mango Tree is an old and venerated trick as performed by street magicians of the past and while it is demonstrably not of the hand magic variety, it exemplifies the fact that even large stage sized illusions can be presented in the street. In the trick, the magician apparently plants a mango seed, covers it with a cloth, makes mysterious incantations and, removing the cloth from time to time successively shows a tree of various heights, up to two or three feet. The same effect was achieved by the Apaches. Instead of a mango seed, a yucca seed was planted and watered. Covering the seed with a rawhide animal skin, the seed would apparently root, grow and finally flower within the span of but a few minutes.

Anthropologists chronicle this form of street magic from approximately 3,000 years ago – and there are records of such performers across the continents, notably Europe, Asia/South Asia and the Middle East. While it is a very old performing style, its history is not particularly well documented in print. In his diary, Samuel Pepys mentions seeing magicians performing in this fashion in the 17th century, and one can see street magicians in depictions by Hieronymous Bosch, William Hogarth, and Pieter Brueghel. Book XIII of Reginald Scot's Discoverie of Witchcraft (1584) describes magic tricks of the type performed by buskers in the 16th century.

Christian Farla performs street magic on Dutch Television

New York based artist and magician Jeff Sheridan is regarded as one of the pre-eminent U.S. street magicians to emerge from the surge in street performance artistry which began in the late '60s. He authored the 1977 book, Street Magic, taught Jeff McBride and allegedly was one of the performers who inspired and taught the young David Blaine after Blaine saw Sheridan perform in Central Park.

Yorkshire Egg Magic is a long practised form of traditional street magic in the UK.

More recently, other performers have garnered accolades from the magic community for their contributions to the art. Jim Cellini (a.k.a. Richard Sullivan) has been a full-time street performer since the 1970s and has published a book (Cellini: The Royal Touch) and DVDs (The Art of Street Performing, volumes 1–3) on the subject. Gazzo Macee (a.k.a. Gary Osborne) has been a full-time street performer since the 1980s and has published a booklet ("The Art of Krowd Keeping" written for Gazzo by Danny Hustle and Jim Wells) and DVD (Street Cups) on the subject. Eric Evans has been a full-time professional since the 1990s and co-wrote – along with Nowlin Craver – a book on the subject (The Secret Art of Magic).

== Guerrilla magic ==
The second category is more appropriately called "guerrilla magic". It is a relatively recent style of performing magic illusions where the magician performs a single trick or two in a public space (such as on a sidewalk) for an unpaying audience. The desired effect of this "hit and run" style of magic is to give the audience a feeling that what they are seeing is impromptu, unrehearsed, and experimental.

This style of "street magic" is associated with David Blaine (who popularized the term) and more recently, Criss Angel, Derren Brown and Cyril Takayama. The format was developed to play well on television beginning with the 1997 ABC television special David Blaine: Street Magic. Many magicians respect Blaine's choice of material and give him credit for creating an image of the contemporary magician distinct from other magicians in recent television history, such as David Copperfield or Doug Henning. However, magic historians, such as Jamy Ian Swiss note that "guerrilla magic" is primarily associated with only a few individuals who perform on television and certain magic dealers who sell effects to amateur magicians who watch these programs. Eugene Burger opined to Jamy Ian Swiss "On one level it's the ultimate trivialization of magic: accosting strangers on the street."

== See also ==
- Florian Zimmer
- Dynamo
- Gazzo
- Harry Anderson
- David Blaine
- Jeff Sheridan
- Whit Haydn
- Mark Edward
