= Harry Gardiner =

American urban climber

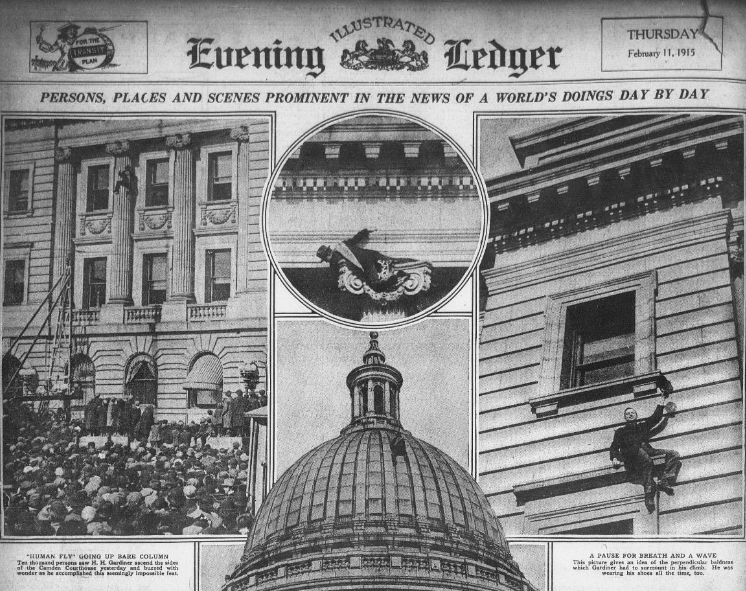
- Harry Gardiner in 1915
- Born: (1871); New York City, US
- Died: (1956); Washington, D. C.
- Occupations: Illusionist, climber, escapologist, stunt performer, actor

Harry H. Gardiner (1871 – 1956), better known as the Human Fly, was an American man famous for climbing buildings. He began climbing in 1905, and successfully climbed over 700 buildings in Europe and North America, usually wearing ordinary street clothes and using no special equipment. "One hundred and twenty of those who have sought to imitate me in this hazardous profession have fallen to death," Gardiner is quoted as saying in a 1905 article published in Muscle Builder. "There is no chance of 'rehearsing' your performance. Each new building is an unknown problem. If you do not guess the right answer, death awaits below, with a breath of up-rushing air, and arms of concrete." Former President Grover Cleveland reportedly nicknamed him "The Human Fly." When he visited Logan, West Virginia in January 1927, the Logan Banner described him as a "boyish-looking man of 57 years." Gardiner reportedly moved to Europe after New York enacted legislation forbidding anyone from climbing on the outside of buildings. A person matching his description was found beaten to death at the base of the Eiffel Tower in 1933. However, obituaries from both the Evening Star (Washington, D.C) and the Cumberland News (Cumberland, Maryland) note that Harry H. Gardiner, the Human Fly, died at home at the age of 89 in 1956.

== Climbs ==
Some of the climbs Gardiner performed:

- June 9, 1916 in Omaha, Nebraska—More than 30,000 spectators, "the largest in the history of Omaha," watched as Gardiner scaled The Omaha World-Herald building. "It seems all a part of a day's work to me," Gardiner said. "There's the wall with the little projections, ledges and places to which I must hold. And there's the top of the building, where I'm going to stop."
- August 9, 1916 Gardiner climbed up to the top of the 10-story Torrey Building in Downtown Duluth, Minnesota. The event was sponsored by the Duluth Herald who reported about it in that day's issue. An estimated 25,000 people watched the climb.
- August 12, 1916 Gardiner climbed to the top of the 16-story Alworth Building in Downtown Duluth, Minnesota as reported in that day's Duluth Herald. About 5,000 people witnessed Gardiner climb up what was Minnesota's second tallest building at that time. Once he got to the top, he climbed further up the tall flag pole that was on the roof.
- September 23, 1916 Gardiner climbed the exterior of the Michigan State Capitol building in Lansing, Michigan, all the way to the metal ball on the pinnacle of the dome, at both noon and 7:30pm. Crowds were estimated at 30,000 and 25,000 by the Lansing State Journal.
- October 7, 1916 in Detroit – The Detroit News had hired Gardiner to attract attention to the News' ad-taking office by climbing up the 14-story Majestic Building at 12:15 PM. He wore all white, tennis shoes and rimless spectacles.
- January 30, 1917 in Birmingham, Alabama – Gardiner scaled the 16-story "Empire Building" at the so-called Heaviest Corner on Earth.
- October 10, 1917 Gardiner again climbed the Michigan State Capitol at both noon and in the evening. This time he placed an American flag on the topmost point of the dome. The Lansing State Journal reported wet weather conditions and a crowd of about 10,000.
- October 31, 1918 in Vancouver, British Columbia – Gardiner climbed up the outside of the 17-story World Building known today as the Sun Tower to promote Victory Loans. The Vancouver World newspaper was published in this building at the time.
- November 11, 1918 in Hamilton, Ontario – Gardiner climbed the Bank of Hamilton building to celebrate the end of World War I. While climbing the side of the building, Gardiner stuck his head into one of the open windows and signed some insurance papers. He also purchased a $1,000 bond. The 47-year-old professional Fly admitted that he had to try for insurance at the Bank of Hamilton because it had so far been impossible for him to gain insurance elsewhere, since he was considered a high risk. This spectacle brought much attention to the Bank of Hamilton.
- January 1927 in Huntington, West Virginia – A few days before arriving in Logan, WV, "an enormous assemblage" watched as Gardiner climbed the Coal Exchange Building in Huntington, WV. The building was described as a few hundred feet tall, "as high as any building in the state."
- January 27 and 29, 1927 in Logan, West Virginia – Sponsored by the Neely-Gunther-Nowlan Post of the American Legion, Gardiner climbed the north wall of the Logan County Courthouse on January 27 at 7:30 p.m. and unfurled a U.S. flag. On January 25, the Logan Banner provided details about how the climb would occur: "As he climbs he will perform many a stunt to amuse and startle the interested throng. All this time his figure will be in the glare of a searchlight provided for the purpose and his feat will be done without the aid of any mechanical device." Crowd attendance was estimated at more than 5000 persons. Plans to climb the White-Browning building were canceled when Gardiner could not procure permission to scale it. On January 29, he climbed the five-story Pioneer Hotel in Logan. On February 1, the Banner described is thusly: "With the aid of a hook at each window, he was able to get finger holds on the sills and then lift himself in safety and prepare for the next step upward. To scale the last lap and reach the roof he made use of the braces for the electric hotel sign for a foothold and also the lowered hook to get a finger hold on the edge of the roof." Most spectators watched from Stratton Street and extended sixty to seventy feet out on Cole Street; hundreds watched from the windows of nearby buildings. From Logan, Gardiner traveled to Williamson, West Virginia where he climbed the Mountaineer Hotel.

Gardiner is mentioned in a story of present-day skyscraper climber Alain Robert, The New Yorker magazine, April 20, 2009.

== See also ==
- Dan Goodwin
- Ivan Kristoff
- Philippe Petit
- Owen Quinn
- Alain Robert
- George Willig
