= Ivan Kristoff =

Bulgarian Canadian aviator and rescue worker (born 1968)

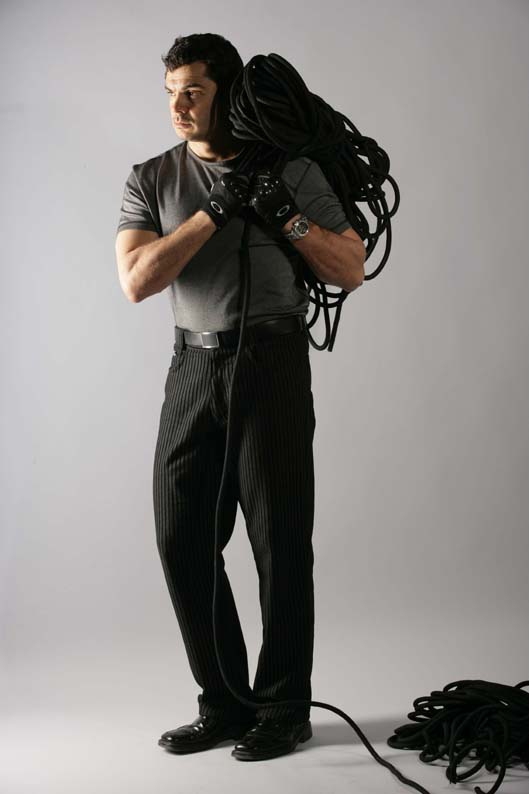
- Born: 27 June 1968 (age 57); Bulgaria
- Occupations: aviator, rescuer
- Website: ivankristoff.com

Ivan Kristoff (born Ivan Hristov; June 6, 1968) is a Bulgarian Canadian aviator and rescue worker. He has helped improve the safety of vertical and aerial rope manoeuvres.

== Early life ==
At the age of 15 Kristoff made his own improvised climbing tools and started rock climbing and rappelling. He later joined caving clubs, including the Speleo Club. During caving activities in the western part of Bulgaria, he discovered new extensions of the Cave "Goliamata Balabanova". The club mapped the new areas and extended the explored area of the cave by more than 4,500 metres.

He started solo climbing and joined an alpine club with the goal of escaping the communist regime.

In 1987–1989, Kristoff was conscripted into the Bulgarian Army. Upon his discharge, he joined a national expedition and climbed Mount Elbrus in the Caucasus, Georgia.

== Career ==
After the fall of communism in his homeland, Kristoff moved to Canada, where he attempted to join the Toronto Police Service, but was rejected due to his poor English skills. In 1990 he started a business for vertical access on the exteriors of high-rise buildings in Toronto. He has completed some challenging rope access projects in the high-rise environment. One was an exterior repair in 2003 of the CN Tower antenna mast at 526 metres (1,726 ft), during extreme winter conditions with winds above 60 kilometres per hour (37 mph).

Kristoff founded the first volunteer urban high angle rescue team – the Canadian Highrise Emergency Aerial Response Team (HEART), a non-profit organization whose aim is to "minimize the loss of life and to increase the safety of the public." HEART was created to address the needs of over 12,000 high-rises in Ontario, to improve training procedures for rope workers, and to prevent accidents for which traditional emergency response teams would not be equipped.

In Bulgaria Kristoff founded the first volunteer Special Operations Services (SOS) Team. He organized and completed the first aerial video surveillance (from a helicopter) with the technology of 3G and 4G in real time. The event was documented with an expert from VIVACOM (a GSM operator in Bulgaria), a TV crew from BBT TV, and Krasimir Svrakov, Chief of Photography of The Standart. The project was developed by Ivan Kristoff and experts in mobile computing and IT communications. Over a one-year period, these experts, along with a representative from Hewlett-Packard Bulgaria, worked together with Kristoff to find the most advanced equipment and wireless video broadcast technology (including IP cameras). These information systems can be used in remote areas during crisis situations.

In recognition for Kristoff's contribution to the emergency services community in Canada, the organizing committee of the Toronto Police invited him to be part of the first annual Law Enforcement and Emergency Services Appreciation Day. The event took place at the Canadian National Exhibition. At the third Appreciation Day, Kristoff led the parade, along with members of the Royal Canadian Mounted Police and other Canadian law enforcement agencies.

In 2001 Kristoff was chosen by the Toronto community as one of its "Unsung Heroes". The same year, he opened the CFL playoff game between the Toronto Argonauts and Montreal Alouettes by rappelling down from the roof of the Rogers Centre.

Currently, Kristoff is working on creating an International Vertical Access Network called I.V.A.N., the main goal of which is to share new trends to the high altitude vertical and aerial industry.

=== Photography ===
While studying at the University of Toronto, Kristoff pursued his interest in photography and participated in a photography exhibition in Plovdiv, Bulgaria. His photographs document aerial and technical operations.

His projects have appeared in publications including the Toronto Computes, Computer Player, Quebec Micro, The Athlete, Bulgarian Army Newspaper, National Post, The Toronto Sun, The Globe and Mail, Town Crier, Mississauga News, Mississauga Business Times, and others.

== See also ==
- Harry Gardiner
- Dan Goodwin
- Philippe Petit
- Owen Quinn
- Alain Robert
- George Willig
