= George Willig =

Urban climber

Personal information
- Nationality: American
- Born: January 11, 1949

George Willig (born June 11, 1949) (a.k.a. "The Human Fly" or "The Spiderman") is a mountain-climber from New York, New York, United States, who climbed the South Tower (2 World Trade Center) of the World Trade Center on May 26, 1977, about two and a half years after tightrope walker Philippe Petit walked between the tops of the two towers.

== Life and climb ==
Before the stunt, Willig was a toymaker. At the time of the climb, 2 WTC was the third tallest building in the world, behind 1 WTC and the Sears Tower. It took Willig 3.5 hours to scale the tower. While the City of New York initially announced it would fine him $250,000 for "the inconvenience the stunt caused," New York City Mayor Abraham Beame fined him just $1.10, one cent for each of the skyscraper's 110 stories.

Willig visited the World Trade Center a year before the stunt and took measurements for the equipment he would need. He made special clamps that fit into the window washing tracks of the South Tower. The clamps he designed would lock into place when they were pulled down by his body weight. They would release when he decided to raise them. Once he built the equipment, he went to the World Trade Center 4 to 5 times at night to test the equipment. He began his climb at 6:30 a.m. that Thursday morning. As he was climbing, two police officers, one a suicide expert, were lowered in a window washing basket to try to get Willig to give up. Willig swung away from the officers so they could not grab him. Willig and the officers talked, and the suicide expert realized that Willig knew what he was doing and was not a threat. The officer passed him a pen and paper, and Willig signed it "Best Wishes to my co-ascender." Police helped him to the top of the tower by pulling him through a tiny window hatch at 10:05 a.m. and he was arrested. Willig said he could hear the crowd cheering from ground level. His climb received plenty of attention because it took 3½ hours to complete, allowing news cameras and spectators to gather. The only significant problem Willig ran into was irregularities in window washing tracks. However, he was prepared for this because he brought a small hammer to fix the irregularities. He signed his name and the date on a piece of metal on the observation deck of the South Tower, which was still visible until the tower was destroyed on September 11, 2001.

The stunt paved the way for appearances on The Tonight Show Starring Johnny Carson, Good Morning America, The Merv Griffin Show, and ABC's Wide World of Sports. He also got jobs as a stuntman on The Six Million Dollar Man, Trauma Center, and Hollywood Beat

George Willig and Jery Hewitt climbed the Unisphere in Queens in 1976.

In 1979, he published a book called Going It Alone (ISBN 0-385-14726-0).

During the 1990s, Willig lived in California's San Fernando Valley, working as a remodeler of commercial buildings.

After the 9/11 attacks that destroyed both towers of the World Trade Center, Willig said he regretted climbing the tower, as his actions may have brought them to the attention of terrorists. But he later told CNN that was just an initial, emotional reaction and that he was still glad to have climbed the tower.

== See also ==
- Harry Gardiner
- Dan Goodwin
- Ivan Kristoff
- Philippe Petit
- Owen Quinn
- Alain Robert
