= Philippe Petit =

French highwire artist (born 1949)

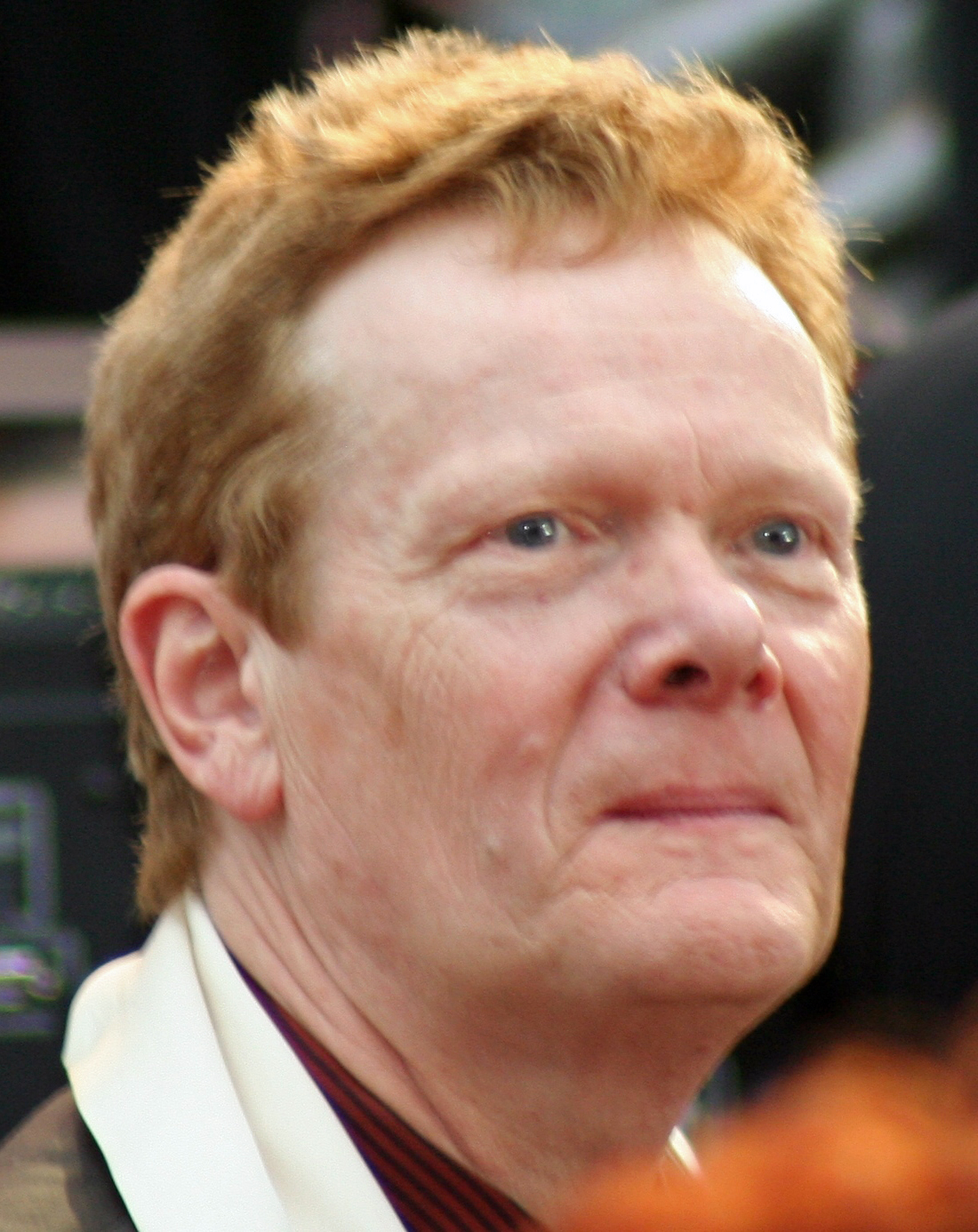
- Petit at the 81st Academy Awards in 2009
- Born: 13 August 1949 (age 77); Nemours, Seine-et-Marne, France
- Occupation: Highwire artist
- Known for: Walking a rope line between the Twin Towers

Philippe Petit (French pronunciation: [filip pəti]; born 13 August 1949) is a French highwire artist who gained fame for his unauthorized highwire walks between the towers of Notre-Dame Cathedral in Paris in 1971 and of Sydney Harbour Bridge in 1973, as well as between the Twin Towers of the World Trade Center in New York City on 7 August 1974.

Since then, Petit has lived in New York, where he has been artist-in-residence at the Cathedral of St. John the Divine, another site of his aerial performances. He has done wire walking as part of official celebrations in New York, across the United States, and in France and other countries, as well as teaching workshops on the art. In 2008, Man on Wire, a documentary directed by James Marsh about Petit's walk between the towers, won numerous awards including the 2009 Academy Award for Best Documentary Feature. The Walk, a film based on Petit's walk, was released in September 2015, starring Joseph Gordon-Levitt as Petit and directed by Robert Zemeckis. Petit was also the subject of a children's book and an animated adaptation of it, released in 2005.

He also became adept at equestrianism, juggling, fencing, carpentry, rock-climbing, and bullfighting. Spurning circuses and their formulaic performances, he created his street persona on the sidewalks of Paris. In the early 1970s, he visited New York City, where he frequently juggled and worked on a slackline in Washington Square Park.

== Early life and career ==
Petit was born in Nemours, Seine-et-Marne, France; his father Edmond Petit was an author and an army pilot. At an early age, Petit discovered magic and juggling. He loved to climb, and at 16, he took his first steps on a tightrope wire. He told a reporter,

Within one year, I taught myself to do all the things you could do on a wire. I learned the backward somersault, the front somersault, the unicycle, the bicycle, the chair on the wire, jumping through hoops. But I thought, "What is the big deal here? It looks almost ugly." So I started to discard those tricks and to reinvent my art.

In June 1971, Petit secretly installed a cable between the two towers of Notre-Dame de Paris. On the morning of 26 June 1971, he "juggled balls" and "pranced back and forth" as he crossed the wire on foot to the applause of the crowd below.

== World Trade Center stunt ==
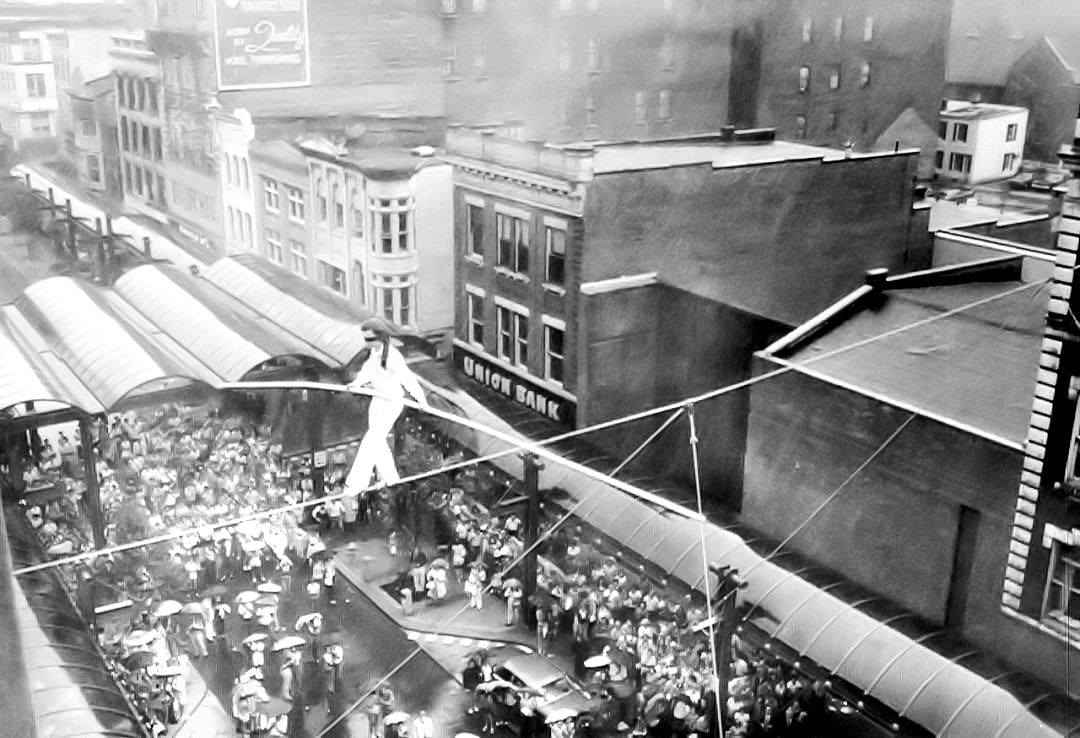
In this 1974 promotion for Hess's department store, Petit tight roped across Hamilton Street in Allentown, Pennsylvania

Petit became known to New Yorkers in the early 1970s for his frequent tightrope-walking performances and magic shows in the city parks, especially Washington Square Park. Petit's most famous performance was in August 1974, conducted on a wire between the roofs of the Twin Towers of the World Trade Center in Lower Manhattan, New York City, 400 metres (1,312 feet) above the ground. He performed for 45 minutes, making eight passes along the wire, during which he walked, danced, lay down on the wire, and saluted watchers from a kneeling position. Office workers, construction crews, and policemen cheered him on.

=== Planning ===
Petit conceived his "coup" when he was 18, when he first read about the proposed construction of the Twin Towers and saw drawings of the project in a magazine he read in 1968 while sitting at a dentist's office.

What was called the "artistic crime of the century" took Petit six years of planning. During this period, he learned everything he could about the buildings and their construction. In the same period, he began to perform highwire walking at other famous places. Rigging his wire secretly, he performed as a combination of circus act and public display. In 1971, he performed his first such walk between the towers of the cathedral of Notre-Dame de Paris, while priests were being ordained inside the building. In 1973, he walked a wire rigged between the two north pylons of the Sydney Harbour Bridge.

In planning for the Twin Towers walk, Petit had to learn how to accommodate issues such as the swaying of the high towers due to wind, which was part of their design; effects of wind and weather on the wire at that height; how to rig a 200-foot (61 m) steel cable across the 138-foot (42 m) gap between the towers (at a height of 1,368 feet (417 m)); and how to gain entry with his collaborators, first to scope out the conditions and lastly to stage the project. Petit and his collaborators had to bring heavy equipment to the rooftops. He traveled to New York on numerous occasions to make first-hand observations.

Since the towers were still under construction, Petit and one of his collaborators, New York-based photographer Jim Moore, rented a helicopter to take aerial photographs of the buildings. Two more collaborators, Jean François Heckel and Jean-Louis Blondeau, helped him practice in a field in France, and accompanied him to take part in the final rigging of the project, as well as to photograph it. Francis Brunn, a German juggler, provided financial support for the proposed project and its planning.

Petit and his crew gained entry into the towers several times and hid in upper floors and on the roofs of the unfinished buildings to study security measures. They also analyzed the construction and identified places to anchor the wire and cavaletti (guy lines). Using his own observations, drawings, and Moore's photographs, Petit constructed a scale model of the towers to design the needed rigging for the wire walk.

Working from the ID of an American who worked in the building, Petit made fake identification cards for himself and his collaborators (claiming they were contractors who were installing an electrified fence on the roof) to gain access to the buildings. Prior to this, Petit had carefully observed the clothes worn by construction workers and the kinds of tools they carried. He also took note of the clothing of office workers so that some of his collaborators could pose as white-collar workers. He observed what time the workers arrived and left, so he could determine when he would have roof access.

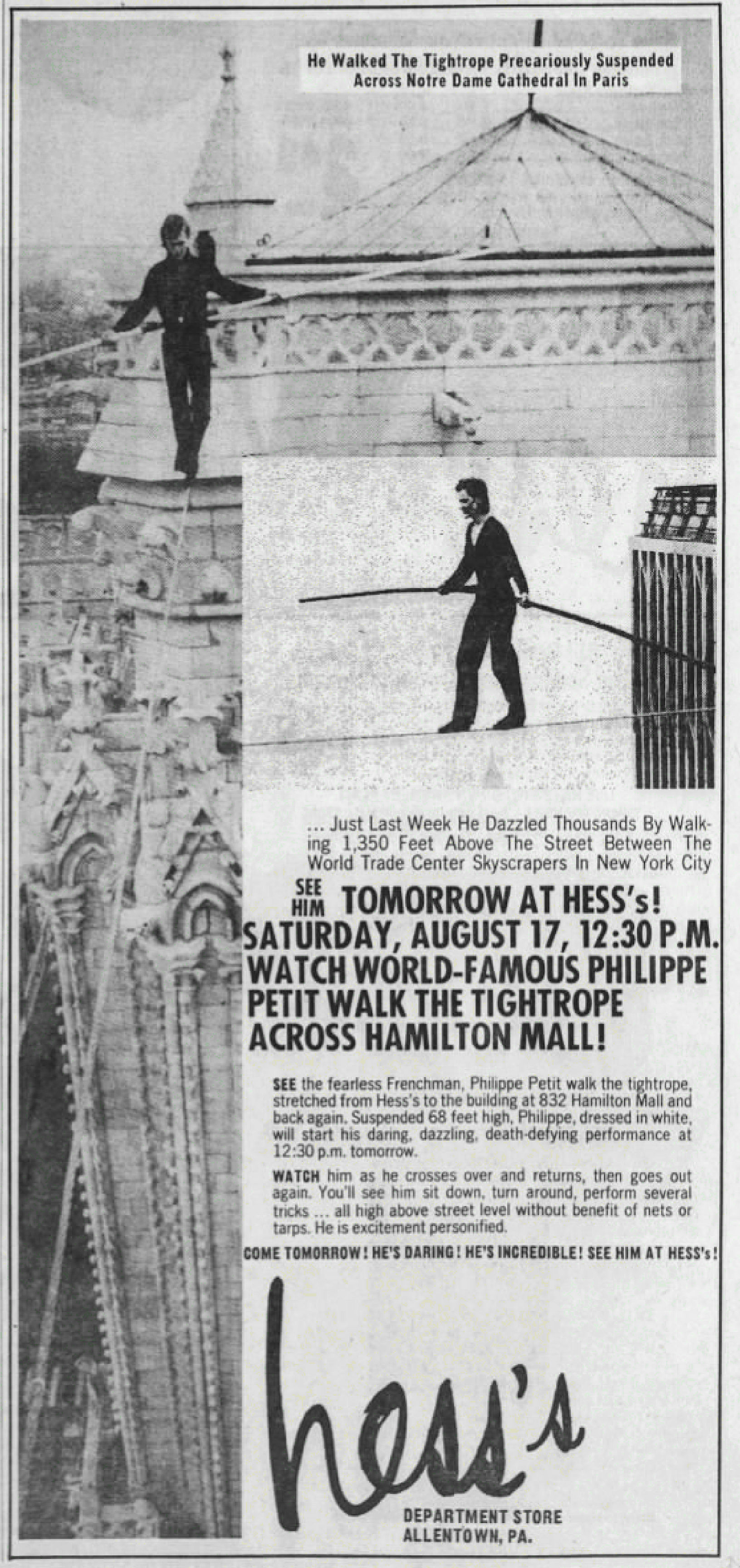
1974 Hess's ad, with an image of Petit's walk across the Twin Towers

On the night of Tuesday, 6 August 1974, Petit and his crew had a lucky break and got a ride in a freight elevator to the 104th floor with their equipment. They stored it 19 steps below the roof. To pass the cable across the void, Petit and his crew had decided on using a bow and arrow attached to monofilament, attached to a rope. They had to practice this many times to perfect their technique. They first shot the fishing line, which was attached to larger ropes, and finally to the 450-pound (200 kg) steel cable. The team was delayed when the heavy cable sank too fast, and had to be pulled up manually for hours. Petit had already identified points at which to anchor two cavaletti to other points to stabilize the cable and keep the swaying of the wire to a minimum.

=== Event ===
Shortly after 8 am local time on 7 August, Petit stepped out on the wire and started to perform. He was 1,350 feet (410 m) above the ground. He performed for 45 minutes, making eight passes along the wire, during which he walked, danced, lay down on the wire, and knelt to salute watchers. Crowds gathered on the streets below. He said later that he could hear their murmuring and cheers.

When New York Police Department and Port Authority Police Department police officers learned of his stunt, they came up to the roofs of both buildings to try to persuade him to leave the wire. They threatened to pluck him off by helicopter. Feeling that he had "trespassed long enough into these forbidden regions", and because the wire was starting to become dangerous to walk on due to rain, Petit left the wire and surrendered to the police.

=== Aftermath ===
There was extensive news coverage and public appreciation of Petit's highwire walk. District attorney Richard Kuh dropped all formal charges of trespassing and other items relating to his walk on condition that Petit give a free aerial show for children in Central Park. On Thursday, 29 August, he performed on a highwire walk in the park above Belvedere Lake (now Turtle Pond).

The Port Authority of New York and New Jersey gave Petit a lifetime pass to the Twin Towers' observation deck. He autographed a steel beam close to the point where he began his walk, which was later destroyed in the September 11 attacks.

Petit's highwire walk is credited with bringing the Twin Towers much-needed attention and even affection, as they initially had been unpopular. Critics such as historian Lewis Mumford had regarded them as ugly and utilitarian in design, and too large a development for the area. The Port Authority was having trouble renting out all of the office space.

== Representation in other media ==
Petit's World Trade Center stunt was the subject of Sandi Sissel's 1984 half-hour documentary, High Wire, which featured music from Philip Glass's Glassworks.

Mordicai Gerstein wrote and illustrated a children's book, The Man Who Walked Between the Towers (2003), which won a Caldecott Medal for his art. It was adapted and produced as an animated short film by the same title, directed by Michael Sporn, produced by Weston Woods and released in 2005, which won several awards.

The documentary film Man on Wire (2008), by UK director James Marsh, tells of Petit, his collaborators, and his 1974 WTC performance. It won both the World Cinema Jury and Audience awards at the Sundance Film Festival 2008. It combines historical footage with re-enactment and has the spirit of a heist film. It won awards at the 2008 Full Frame Documentary Film Festival in Durham, North Carolina, and the Academy Award for Best Documentary in 2008. On stage with Marsh to accept the Oscar award, Petit made a coin vanish in his hands while thanking the academy "for believing in magic". He then balanced the Oscar by its head on his chin to cheers from the audience.

The same stunt was fictionalized in a biographical drama entitled The Walk (2015), directed by Robert Zemeckis and starring Joseph Gordon-Levitt as Petit.

Author Colum McCann fictionalized Petit's appearance above New York as a unifying thread throughout his 2009 novel Let the Great World Spin.

== Later life ==
Petit has made dozens of public highwire performances in his career. For example, in 1986 he re-enacted the crossing of the Niagara River by Blondin for an IMAX film. In 1989, to celebrate the 200th anniversary of the French Revolution, mayor Jacques Chirac invited him to walk an inclined wire strung from the ground at the Place du Trocadéro to the second level of the Eiffel Tower, crossing the Seine.

Petit briefly headlined with the Ringling Brothers Circus, but preferred staging his own performances. During his stint with the circus and a practice walk, he suffered his only fall, from 45 feet (14 m), breaking several ribs. He says he has never fallen during a performance: "If I had, I wouldn't be here talking about it."

Petit regularly gives lectures and workshops internationally on a variety of topics and subjects. He single-handedly built a barn in the Catskill Mountains using the methods and tools of 18th-century timber framers. In 2011, he published his eighth book, A Square Peg. He has also created an ebook for TED Books, entitled Cheating the Impossible: Ideas and Recipes from a Rebellious High-Wire Artist. Petit divides his time between New York City, where he is an artist in residence at the Cathedral of Saint John the Divine, and a hideaway in the Catskill Mountains.

Director James Signorelli assisted with creation of Petit's book To Reach the Clouds (2002), about the Twin Towers walk. Petit not only wrote about his feat, and events that led to the performance, but also expressed his emotions following the September 11 attacks, during which the Twin Towers were destroyed. He wrote that on that morning, "My towers became our towers. I saw them collapse – hurling, crushing thousands of lives. Disbelief preceded sorrow for the obliteration of the buildings, perplexity descended before rage at the unbearable loss of life." Petit paid tribute to those who were killed and supported rebuilding the towers, promising that "When the towers again twin-tickle the clouds, I offer to walk again, to be the expression of the builders' collective voice. Together, we will rejoice in an aerial song of victory." However, a different complex of buildings has been developed on the site, and does not offer this opportunity.

== Legacy and honors ==
- James Parks Morton Interfaith Award
- Streb Action Maverick Award
- The Byrdcliffe Award

== Works and performances ==
=== Major performances ===
Year	Walk	Location	Notes	Refs
1971	Vallauris	Vallauris, Alpes-Maritimes, France	performance for artist Pablo Picasso's 90th birthday	
1971	Notre-Dame Cathedral	Notre-Dame Cathedral; Paris, France	staged walk between towers without permission	
1973	Sydney Harbour Bridge	Sydney Harbour Bridge; Sydney, Australia	staged walk between towers without permission	
1974	World Trade Center	World Trade Center; New York City, United States	staged walk between towers without permission	
1974	Central Park	Central Park; New York City	Publicly authorized walk on inclined wire over Turtle Pond	
1974	Laon Cathedral	Laon Cathedral; Laon, France	performing on wire between the cathedral's two spires for an international television special	
1975	Louisiana Superdome	Louisiana Superdome; New Orleans, Louisiana, United States	walk on wire across interior for the opening of the stadium	
1982	Cathedral of Saint John the Divine	Cathedral of Saint John the Divine; New York City, United States	interior walk in height of nave to celebrate renewal of the cathedral's construction following a 40-year hiatus	
1982	Concert in the Sky	Denver, Colorado, United States	Highwire play directed and produced by Petit for the opening of the World Theatre Festival	
1983	Skysong	Purchase, New York, United States	Highwire play directed and produced by Petit for the opening of "Summerfare," the State University of New York Arts Festival	
1983	Centre Georges Pompidou	Centre Georges Pompidou; Paris, France		
1984	Corde Raide-Piano Volant	Paris, France	Highwire play directed and produced by Petit with pop-music singer-songwriter Jacques Higelin	
1984	Paris Opera	Paris Opera; Paris, France	Highwire improvisation with opera singer Margherita Zimmermann	
1984	Museum of the City of New York	Museum of the City of New York; New York City, United States	Highwire performance for the opening of the museum's Daring New York exhibit	
1986	Ascent	Cathedral of Saint John the Divine; New York City, United States	Concert for grand piano and highwire on an inclined cable above the nave of the cathedral	
1986	Lincoln Center	Lincoln Center; New York City, United States	Highwire performance for the reopening of the Statue of Liberty	
1987	Walking the Harp/A Bridge for Peace	Jerusalem, Israel	Highwire performance on an inclined cable linking the Jewish and Arab quarters for opening of Israel Festival under Jerusalemite Mayor Teddy Kollek	
1987	Moondancer	Portland Center for the Performing Arts; Portland, Oregon, United States	Highwire opera for the opening of the center	
1987	Grand Central Dances	Grand Central Terminal; New York City, United States	Highwire choreography on wire set above the interior concourse of the terminal	
1988	House of the Dead	Paris, France	Creation of the role of the eagle in a production of From the House of the Dead (1930), an opera by Leoš Janáček, directed by Volker Schlöndorff	
1989	Tour Eiffel	Paris, France	Spectacular walk – for an audience of 250,000 – on an inclined 700-metre (2,300-foot) cable linking the Palais de Chaillot with the second story of the Eiffel Tower, commemorating the French Bicentennial and anniversary of the Declaration of the Rights of Man and of the Citizen, under Parisian Mayor Jacques Chirac	
1990	American Overture	American Center; Paris, France	Highwire play for the ground-breaking ceremony of the center	
1990	Tokyo Walk	Tokyo, Japan	Japan's first highwire performance, to celebrate the opening of the Plaza Mikado building in Tokyo's Akasaka district	
1991	Viennalewalk	Vienna, Austria	Highwire performance evoking the history of cinema for the opening of the Vienna International Film Festival, directed by Werner Herzog	
1992	Namur	Namur, Belgium	Inclined walk to the Citadel of Vauban for a telethon benefiting children with leukemia	
1992	Farinet Funambule!	Switzerland	Highwire walk portraying the 19th-century Robin Hood of the Alps culminated by harvesting the world's-smallest registered vineyard, to benefit abused children	
1992	The Monk's Secret Longing	Cathedral of Saint John the Divine; New York City, United States	Highwire performance for the Regents' Dinner, at the centennial celebrations of the cathedral	
1994	Historischer Hochseillauf	Frankfurt, Germany	Historic highwire walk on an inclined cable to celebrate the city's 1,200th anniversary, viewed by 500,000 spectators and the subject of a live, nationally broadcast television special	
1995	Catenary Curve	New York City, United States	Performance during a conference on suspended structures, led by the architect Santiago Calatrava	
1996	ACT	New York City, United States	Medieval performance to celebrate the 25th anniversary of a New York City youth program	
1996	Crescendo	Cathedral of Saint John the Divine; New York City, United States	Theatrical, allegorical New Year's Eve performance on three different wires set in the nave of the cathedral as the farewell tribute to The Very Reverend James Parks Morton, Dean of the Cathedral, and his wife Pamela	
1999	Millennium Countdown Walk	Rose Center for Earth and Space at the American Museum of Natural History; New York City, United States	Inauguration of the center	
2002	Arts on the High Wire 11 January 2002	Hammerstein Ballroom; New York City, United States	Benefit performance for the New York Arts Recovery Fund on an inclined wire, with clown Bill Irwin and pianist Évelyne Crochet	
2002	Crystal Palace	Jacob K. Javits Convention Center; New York City, United States		
2002	Crossing Broadway	New York City, United States	Inclined walk, fourteen stories high, for the television talk show the Late Show with David Letterman (performed regularly since 1993)	

=== Bibliography ===
All books by Philippe Petit.

- Two towers, I walk, (New York: Reader's Digest, 1975), ASIN B00072LQRM
- Trois Coups, (Paris: Herscher, 1983). ISBN 2-7335-0062-7
- On the High Wire, Preface by Marcel Marceau, Postface by Werner Herzog (New York: Random House, 1985). ISBN 0-394-71573-X
- Funambule, (Paris: Albin Michel, 1991) ISBN 978-2-226-04123-4
- Traité du funambulisme, Preface by Paul Auster, (Arles: Actus Sud, 1997), ISBN 2-226-04123-0, (in French / en français)
- Über Mir Der Offene Himmel, (Stuttgart: Urachhaus, 1998) ISBN 978-3-8251-7209-1
- Trattato di Funambolismo, (Milano: Ponte Alle Grazie, 1999) ISBN 88-7928-450-9
- To Reach the Clouds: My High Wire Walk Between the Twin Towers, (New York, North Point Press, 2002). ASIN B000UDX0JA, ISBN 0-86547-651-9, OCLC 49351784
- L'Art du Pickpocket, (Arles: Actes Sud, 2006) ISBN 2-7427-6106-3
- Alcanzar las nubes, (Alpha Decay, Barcelona, 2007) ISBN 978-84-934868-9-1
- Man on Wire, (Skyhorse Publishing, New York, 2008) ISBN 978-1-60239-332-5
- Why Knot?: How to Tie More Than Sixty Ingenious, Useful, Beautiful, Lifesaving, and Secure knots!, (Abrams Image, New York, 2013) ISBN 978-1-4197-0676-9
- Creativity: The Perfect Crime, (Riverhead Hardcover, 2014) ISBN 978-1594631689
- On the High Wire Re-release, Preface by Marcel Marceau, Postface by Werner Herzog (New York: New Directions, 2019). ISBN 0811228649

=== Filmography ===
Year	Film	Location	Role	Notes
1983	Concert in the Sky	Denver		Centre Productions, Inc., directed by Mark Elliot
1984	High Wire	New York		Prairie Dog Productions, directed by Sandi Sissel
1986	Niagara: Miracles, Myths and Magic	Canada	Blondin	Seventh Man Films for the IMAX System, directed by Kieth Merrill
1989	Tour et Fil	France		FR3/Totem Productions, directed by Alain Hattet
1991	Filmstunde	Austria		Werner Herzog Productions, directed by Werner Herzog
1993	Profile of Philippe Petit	Washington, D.C.		National Geographic Explorer Special
1994	The Man on the Wire	Germany		Documentary of the rigging and artistic preparations for Historischer Hochseillauf, Hessischer Rundfunk Television
1994	Historischer Hochseillauf	Germany		Live broadcast of the walk, Hessischer Rundfunk Television, directed by Sacha Arnz
1995	Mondo	France		Costa Gavras Productions, directed by Tony Gatlif
1995	Secrets of Lost Empires: The Incas	Peru		PBS/NOVA and BBC co-production, directed by Michael Barnes
2003	The Center of the World of New York City: A Documentary Film, Episode 8: People & Events: Philippe Petit (1948–)	New York City		PBS
2005	The Man Who Walked Between the Towers	USA		Michael Sporn Animation and Weston Woods Studios
2008	Man on Wire	UK		Wall to Wall/Red Box Films, directed by James Marsh, Academy Award winning documentary
2014	Colt 45	France	Pierre	
2015	The Walk	US		3D biographical drama directed by Robert Zemeckis and starring Joseph Gordon-Levitt as Petit.
2025	Marty Supreme	US	Brussels MC	

== In popular culture ==
- The song, "Man on Wire" by the band 27 is a tribute to Philippe Petit.
- The song, "Sleepwalking," by Danish composer Ste van Holm is a tribute to Petit's World Trade Center walk.
- The Low Anthem's song, "Boeing 737", from their 2011 album Smart Flesh, refers to Petit's Twin Towers walk.
- American rock band Incubus used a photo of Petit as the cover art for their album, If Not Now, When? (2011).
- Colum McCann's National Book Award-winning novel, Let the Great World Spin (2009), features Petit's Twin Towers walk as its opening passage and a centrepiece to which numerous characters are connected.
- Another Colum McCann novel, Apeirogon, incorporates Petit's 1987 tightrope walk between East and West Jerusalem.
- "Funambulist", a song by American metal band Cormorant, is about his walk between the Twin Towers.
- The song "Step Out Of The Void" by musician Howard Moss is a tribute to Philippe Petit, in the album Outside the Pale (2013).
- The song "Man On A Wire" by The Script on their fourth album, No Sound Without Silence, is influenced by Petit's highwire legacy.
- The song "Stand Up Comedy" by U2 on their twelfth album, No Line on the Horizon, references "The wire is stretched in between our two towers".
- Petit was the inspiration for the 5th Anniversary 9/11 cover of The New Yorker magazine (11 September 2006), "Soaring Spirit", by John Mavroudis (concept) and Owen Smith (art). That cover was named Cover of the Year by the American Society of Magazine Editors (ASME). The two-part cover was a first for The New Yorker.
- He's briefly referenced by Spider-Man in the Marvel comic Amazing Spider-Man Annual #10 (1976).

== See also ==
- Harry Gardiner
- Dan Goodwin
- Ivan Kristoff
- Owen Quinn
- Alain Robert
- The Flying Wallendas
- George Willig
