= Jeff Sheridan =

American magician (born 1948)

Jeff Sheridan (1948 - 2025) was an American magician who started his career by specializing in street magic. Sheridan began working in New York City around 1967. He studied briefly at the School of the Visual Arts in NYC in the late 1960s. He authored the 1977 book, Street Magic, An Illustrated History of Wandering Magicians and Their Conjuring Arts. The book was coauthored by Edward Claflin.

Sheridan was best known for his card manipulations, and for his silent avant-garde style of performance which he self-created in NY's Central Park. He was a pioneer at making a living at magic purely by working the street, and was well known as the Central Park magician performing at the Walter Scott statue in NYC in the late 1960s and throughout the 1970s. In 1970 Sheridan co-founded the Theatre of the Surreal, a performance troupe that utilized magical technique to create living surreal vignettes. The troupe, that included Fonje deVre and Donald Waskover (co-founder), performed at Lincoln Center, Carnegie Recital Hall, early SoHo galleries and other venues in the late 1960s and early 1970s. He was also a magic inventor, creating for the major U.S. toy company Milton Bradley's Magic Works line of magic, as well for the Tenyo company of Japan. Sheridan was well known in the magic community, where he lectured on the circuit as well selling his DVDs. He was a teacher of Las Vegas magician Jeff McBride and David Kotkin who used the ideas and tricks taught by Sheridan to later become known as David Copperfield. Jeff Sheridan also authored in 1982 'Nothings Impossible, Stunts to Entertain and Amaze' published by Lothrop Lee and Shepard. The book was illustrated with photographs by NY based performing arts photographer Jim Moore.

Since the 1990s, he has lived mostly in Frankfurt, Germany, performing frequently at Tigerpalast, a variety theater. In recent years, he has increasingly devoted his energies to combining magic and surrealist art, incorporating his own artwork into his performances as a magician. In 2007 and 2008, there have been exhibitions of his artwork in NYC and Frankfurt. His one man show in Germany was a collection of his surrealist objects that were tied thematically to his magic work. His sculptures were shown at the NY gallery Francis Nauman Fine Arts in 2007.

He died on November 26, 2025.
