= Silberturm =

Skyscraper in Frankfurt, Germany

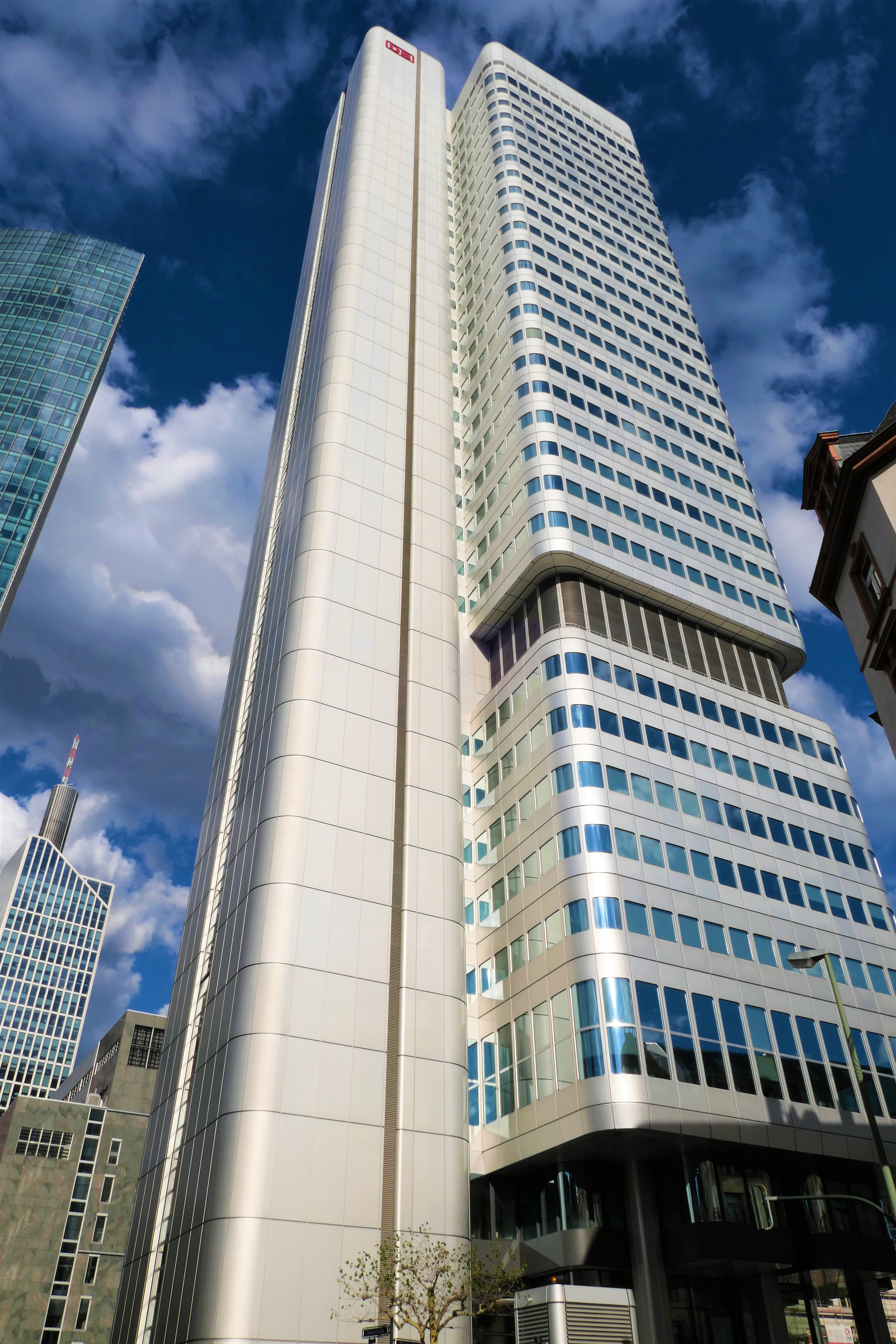
- Facade
- Former names: Dresdner-Bank-Hochhaus; Jürgen-Ponto-Hochhaus

General information
- Type: Commercial offices
- Architectural style: Modernism
- Location: Jürgen-Ponto-Platz 1 Frankfurt; Hesse, Germany
- Coordinates: 50°06′35″N 8°40′10″E
- Construction started: 1972
- Completed: 1978

Height
- Roof: 166.3 m (546 ft)

Technical details
- Floor count: 32; 2 below ground
- Lifts/elevators: 16

Design and construction
- Architect: ABB Architekten
- Engineer: BGS Ingenieursozietät
- Main contractor: Bilfinger Berger; Philipp Holzmann

Silberturm (Silver Tower), formerly known as Dresdner-Bank-Hochhaus and Jürgen-Ponto-Hochhaus, is a 32-storey, 166.3 m (546 ft) futurist skyscraper in the Bahnhofsviertel district of Frankfurt, Germany. It was the tallest building in Germany from 1978 until 1990. Until 2009 it was part of the headquarters of Dresdner Bank, one of Germany's largest banks until its merger with Commerzbank in 2009. Since at least 2012 and still as of 2026, the main tenant is Deutsche Bahn.

== History ==
Built by Bilfinger Berger, the Silberturm is located at Jürgen-Ponto-Platz, which opens onto Kaiserstrasse. The square is named after Jürgen Ponto, the former CEO of Dresdner Bank who was murdered in 1977 by members of the Red Army Faction (RAF). The Silberturm, along with the seven-story building Gallusanlage 8, formed the Dresdner Bank Headquarters from 1978 to 2008. In 2003, a new tower (Gallileo) was built.

After the takeover of Dresdner Bank by Commerzbank in early 2009, the new owner planned to sell the Silberturm because the office space was no longer needed. But since a sale of the building was no longer deemed possible due to the 2008 financial crisis, the complete high-rise and also the Gallusanlage 8 building were leased on long term to Deutsche Bahn in the summer of 2009. The Gallileo highrise will continue to be used by Commerzbank.

== Construction ==
The tower has 2 underground floors and 32 floors above ground. On the third and fourth floors there was a staff canteen until 2008. The 31st floor housed a swimming pool until 1994, when it was converted into a conference room. The 32nd floor was partially destroyed in a 1 April 1998 fire.

The story height of the standard floors is 4.2 m, with a floor area of 1,900 square meters. The highrise is founded on a 3400 m^{2} reinforced concrete slab that is 4.0 m thick. In plan view, the tower consists of two large, rounded squares which are arranged with a longitudinal offset of several meters. In the resulting niches on each side, two elongated rounded rectangles are located, housing the lifts and emergency staircases. The theme of the rounded corners is repeated throughout the building, for example in the windows and pillars, and information signs on the inside.

== Renovation ==
Since late 2008, the Silberturm has stood empty and a complete restoration was planned for the tower in 2009. The goal of this restoration is to modernise the office space and reduced the carbon emissions and energy consumption by one-third. The renovation is necessary for fire safety reasons, plus the renovation is to make a contribution to climate protection. Commerzbank seeks to obtain a certificate of the Deutsche Gesellschaft für Nachhaltiges Bauen in silver. The characteristic facade of the tower will remain unchanged. The gutting of the building and the facade replacement will begin in 2010. Interior renovations will begin in 2010 and the ceiling height is to be raised to 3.10 meters. The renovations will be completed by early 2012 so that the employees of Deutsche Bahn can move into the tower.

== Miscellaneous ==
The building served as a backdrop for the 1984 German movie Abwärts.

The top floor has a gallery with floor-to-ceiling windows wrapping around the auditorium and conference room. The interior hallways there have a collection of neon artwork.

Silberturm is located across the street from Skyper.

== Gallery ==
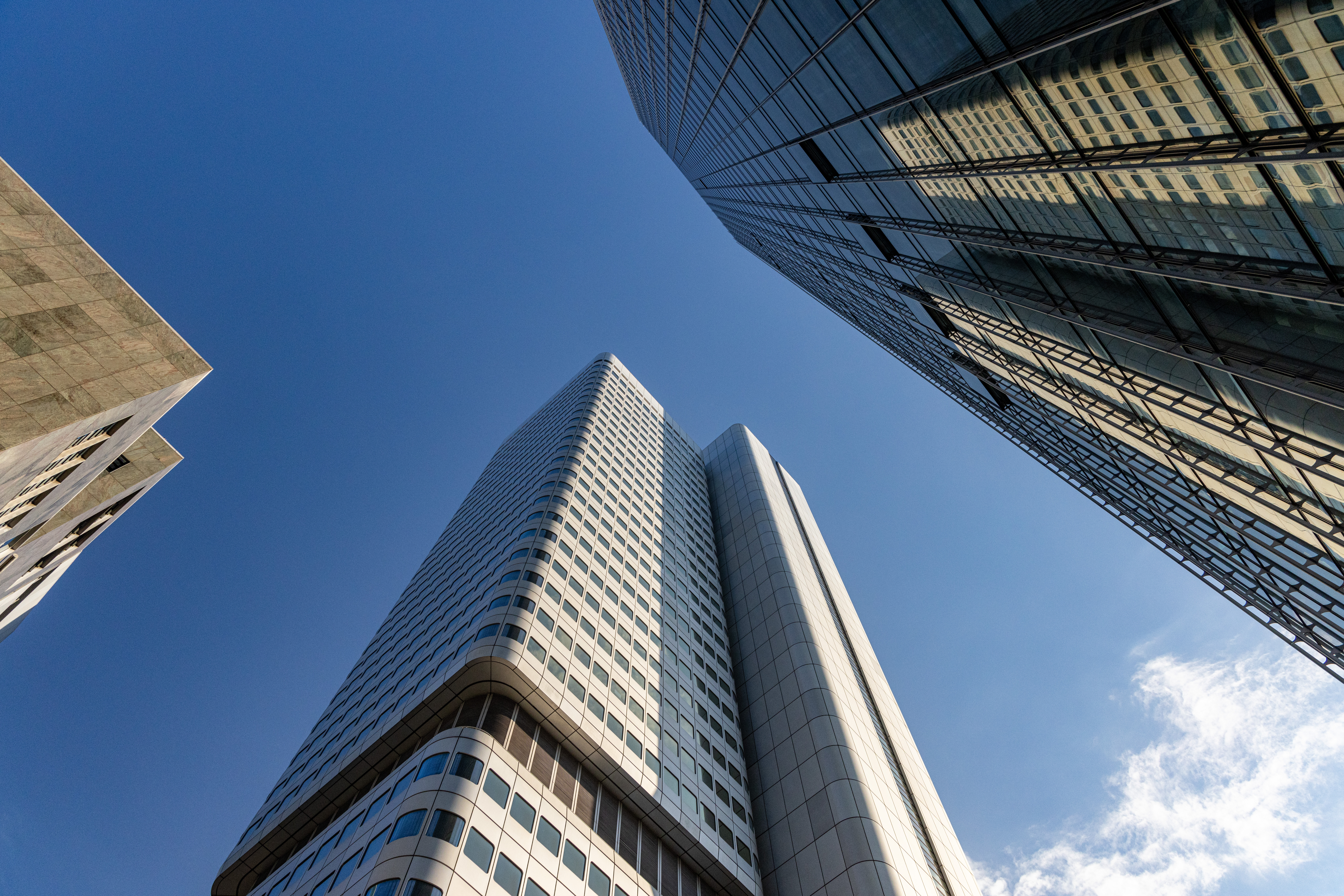
Low Angle view on Silberturm

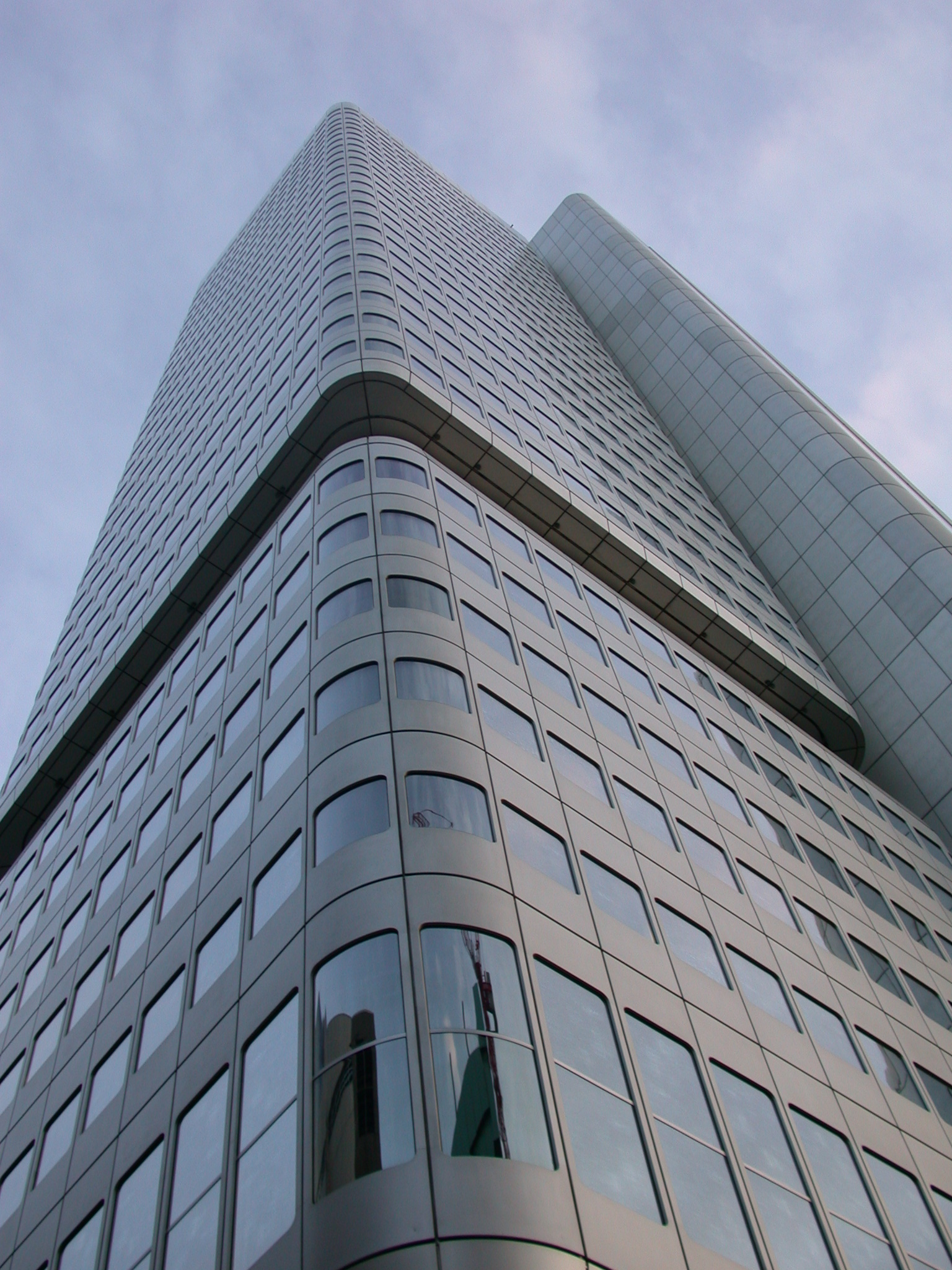
Silberturm from street level

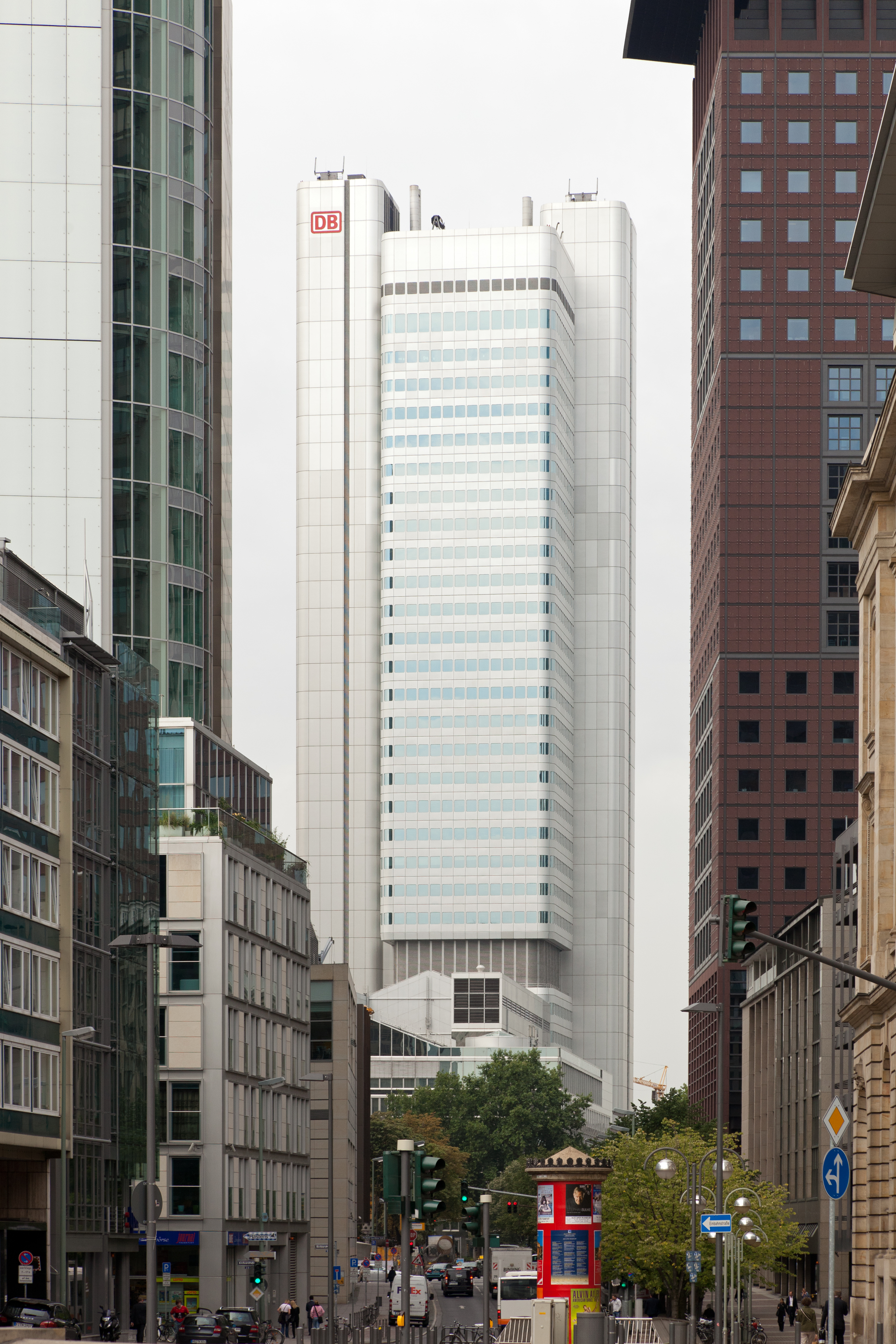
Silberturm viewed from the Roßmarkt

== See also ==
- List of tallest buildings in Frankfurt
- List of tallest buildings in Germany
- List of tallest buildings in Europe
