= Dan Goodwin =

American climber (born 1955)

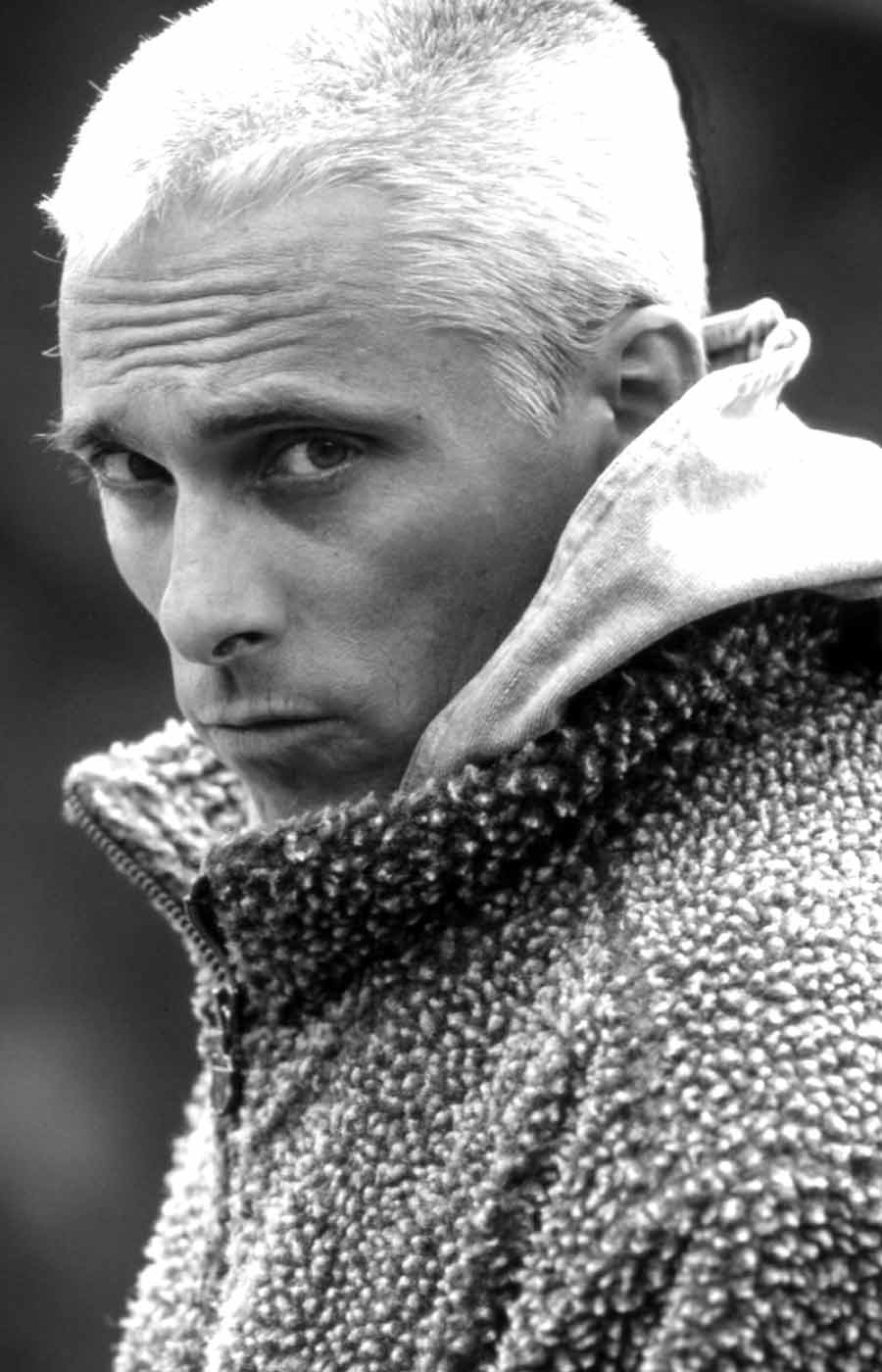

Personal information
- Other names: SpiderDan; SkyscraperMan
- Born: November 7, 1955 (age 70) Kennebunkport, Maine, US
- Website: Dan Goodwin

Climbing career
- Type of climber: Buildering; Free solo climbing; Sport climbing
- Highest grade: Redpoint: 5.13d (8b); Free solo: 5.12b (7b)
- Known for: First-ever free solo at 7b (5.12b); Pioneer of buildering in the United States.

Daniel Goodwin (born November 7, 1955) is an American rock climber best known for performing gymnastic-like flag maneuvers and one-arm flyoffs while free soloing difficult rock climbs on national TV, and for buildering on skyscrapers, including the Sears Tower, the John Hancock Center, the World Trade Center, the CN Tower, and (for the program Stan Lee's Superhumans) the Telefónica Building in Santiago, Chile.

== Buildering ==
On November 21, 1980, Dan Goodwin witnessed the MGM Grand fire in Las Vegas, Nevada, United States, including the inability of the Clark County Fire Department and the supporting fire departments to rescue scores of hotel guests trapped inside. Believing he knew how to rescue the trapped people, Goodwin presented a rescue plan to the on-location fire boss. Goodwin's plan included his climbing up the building and connecting cables to the floors to enable rescue baskets to be ferried to and from helicopters. The fire boss responded by threatening Goodwin with arrest and then ordered him escorted from the scene. The following day, Goodwin approached the fire chief of a Fire Department sub-station and presented his rescue plan. The fire chief told Goodwin he needed to climb a building to learn of the dangers of high-rise firefighting and rescue. The following Memorial Day, Goodwin scaled the outside of the Sears Tower in Chicago (renamed the Willis Tower in 2009), which at the time was the tallest building in the world.

=== Notable building climbs ===
==== Sears Tower ====
On Memorial Day, May 25, 1981, wearing a Spider-Man suit and using suction cups, camming devices, and sky hooks, Goodwin scaled the then-tallest building in the world, the 110-story Sears Tower in Chicago, Illinois. For seven hours, Goodwin fought the high-altitude winds, slippery glass, and repeated attempts by the Chicago Fire Department to stop him. A few feet below the top Goodwin taped an American flag to the building to honor his father, who fought in the Korean War. Chicago's press dubbed him "Spider Dan". Goodwin said he scaled the building to call attention to inadequacies in high-rise firefighting and rescue.

==== Renaissance Tower ====
On November 7, 1981, wearing a Spider-Man suit and using suction cups along with his hands and feet, Goodwin scaled the 56-story Renaissance Tower in Dallas, Texas. Goodwin said he made the climb to keep a promise he made to a young Dallas resident suffering from cystic fibrosis.

==== John Hancock Center ====
On November 11, 1981, wearing a wetsuit disguised as a Spider-Man suit and using a climbing device he designed for the building, Goodwin scaled the 100-story John Hancock Center in Chicago. To avoid firemen who were descending toward him in a window-washing machine, Goodwin swung across the building with a rope. The fire department, on the inside of the building, used fire axes to shatter window glass near Goodwin and then through the openings attempted to dislodge him from the building with grappling hooks attached to long poles. Chicago's mayor, Jane Byrne, intervened, allowing Goodwin to continue to the top. Goodwin said he made the climb to call attention to the inability to successfully fight fires in high-rise buildings.

==== North Tower of the World Trade Center ====
On Memorial Day, May 30, 1983, using suction cups for the first four floors before switching to a camming device he connected to the building's window-washing track, Goodwin scaled the North Tower of the World Trade Center in New York City. Goodwin attached an American flag, the same one he taped to the Sears Tower in 1981, to the upper-most floor of the North Tower in tribute to Americans who died in war. Goodwin said he made the climb to call attention to the inability of first responders to rescue trapped occupants from the upper levels of skyscrapers.

==== CN Tower ====
On June 26, 1986, Goodwin scaled the world's tallest structure (not building) at the time: the CN Tower in Toronto, Ontario. Using his hands and feet, Goodwin climbed one side, rappelled down, then climbed the far side of the tower, followed by another rappel. Goodwin's climb was a sponsored publicity event celebrating the CN Tower's tenth anniversary.

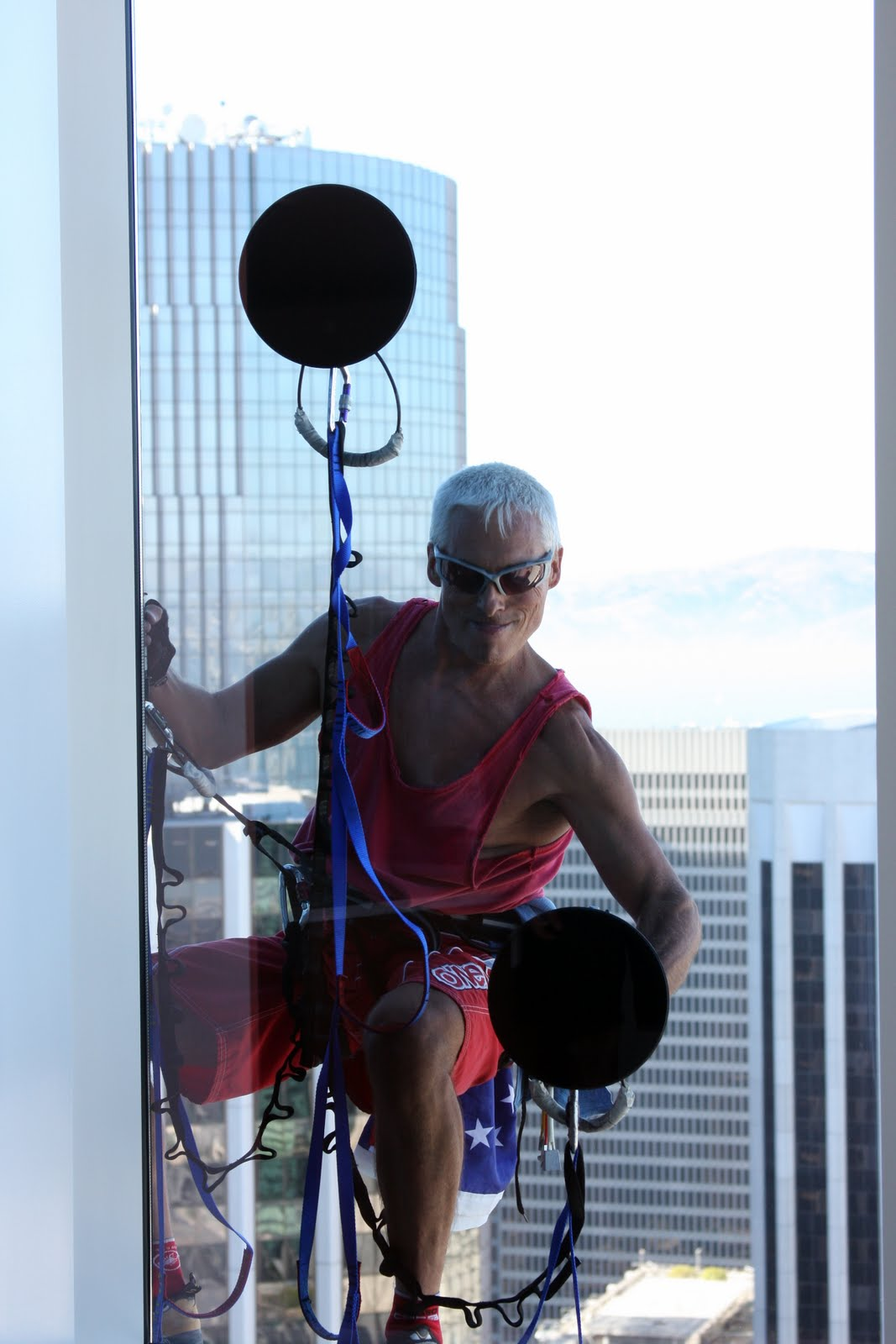
Dan Goodwin outside the 50th floor of the Millennium Tower in San Francisco (September 2010)

==== Millennium Tower ====
On September 6, 2010, Goodwin scaled the Millennium Tower in San Francisco, California, United States. In tribute to the United States, Goodwin attached a United States flag to the top of the Millennium Tower, the same flag he attached to the top of Chicago's Sears Tower in 1981 and to the top of the North Tower of New York's World Trade Center in 1983. Goodwin said he made the climb to call attention to the inability to conduct rescue operations in the upper floors of skyscrapers. In addition, as a Stage Four cancer survivor, Goodwin wanted to inspire people throughout the world who have been diagnosed with cancer.

==== Torre Telefónica Chile ====
On March 1, 2014, Goodwin scaled the Torre Telefónica Chile in Santiago, Chile, to establish a new world record of 433 feet (132 m) for the longest lead climb on a single rope. On average, the safety anchors were 4 to 6 floors apart, raising the possibility of a 180-foot (55 m) fall or more. Commentators believed the weight of the rope (42 pounds (19 kg)) made his ascent considerably more dangerous. The ascent was recorded for a TV show that was planned to be aired in the fall of 2014.

=== History of building climbs ===
Date	Building	Location	Height	Tool
May 25, 1981	Sears Tower	Chicago, Illinois	110 floors	Suction Cups / Camming Device / Sky Hooks
November 7, 1981	Renaissance Tower	Dallas, Texas	56 floors	Suction Cups / Hands & Feet
November 11, 1981	John Hancock Center	Chicago, Illinois	100 floors	Self-Made Climbing Device
February 7, 1982	Centro Simón Bolívar Towers	Caracas, Venezuela	30 floors	Hands & Feet
February 14, 1982	Parque Central Complex	Caracas, Venezuela	56 floors	Suction Cups / Sky Hooks / Hands & Feet
May 30, 1983	World Trade Center – North Tower	New York, New York	110 floors	Suction Cups / Camming Device
March 9, 1984	Nippon Television Tower	Tokyo, Japan	10 floors	Suction Cups
February 27, 1985	Bonaventure Hotel	Los Angeles, California	30 floors	Suction Cups / Hands & Feet
June 26, 1986	CN Tower	Toronto, Ontario, Canada	100 floors x 2	Hands & Feet (scaled twice on same day)
September 6, 2010	Millennium Tower	San Francisco, California	60 floors	Suction Cups / Hands & Feet
March 1, 2014	Torre Telefónica Chile	Santiago, Chile	32 floors 433 feet	Suction Cups – Hands & Feet (world's longest lead climb on a single rope)

== Rock climbing ==
As a rock climber, Goodwin made several first free ascents and frequently—while free soloing—would perform acrobatic maneuvers including the one arm fly-off and flag maneuver. In response to those in the rock-climbing community who called Goodwin's acrobatic moves "stunts", and therefore unworthy of recognition, Goodwin stated he was sport climbing and not bound by the rules of traditional rock climbing.

Climber Jeff Lowe, along with Dick Bass, the owner of the Snowbird ski resort, invited Goodwin to build the climbing wall for the world's first International Sport Climbing Championship, held at Snowbird, Utah, United States, in 1988. Goodwin did not participate in the championship, serving instead as a commentator for CBS Sports.

History of first free ascents
Date	Location	Climb	Rating
January 1980	Joshua Tree National Park, California	White Rasterfarie	V3+
November 1980	Red Rock Canyon National Conservation Area, Nevada	Ixtlan	5.11c (6c+)
February 1984	Joshua Tree National Park, California	Apollo	5.12d (7c)
July 1984	Little Cottonwood Canyon, Utah	Fallen Arches	5.13c (8a+)
August 1984	Quoddy Head State Park, Maine	Maniac	5.13d (8b)
August 1984	Quoddy Head State Park, Maine	Stiletto	5.12b (7b)
August 1984	Quoddy Head State Park, Maine	Yellow Dagger	5.11c (6c+)
August 1984	Quoddy Head State Park, Maine	Triangulation	5.12b (7b)
November 1986	Tahoe Donner, California	Neanderthal Man	5.12a (7a+)
November 1986	Smith Rock State Park, Oregon	Sign of the Times	5.12d (7c)

== Skyscraper defense bill ==
Following the 1993 World Trade Center bombing, Goodwin wrote a bill he called the "Skyscraper Defense Act", calling for an agency within the United States government entitled "Skyscraper Defense" as well as teams of "Skyscraper Defenders", individuals trained in skyscraper defense, security, and safety protocol, to be stationed within major cities of the United States.

== Personal life ==
Goodwin has a wife named Cynthia and an adult son named Keeya and is living in Mountain View, California as of May 2026. He has written a three-part memoir entitled Untethered, which is scheduled for release on May 25, 2026, the 45th anniversary of his ascent of the Sears Tower.

== See also ==
- Harry Gardiner
- Ivan Kristoff
- Philippe Petit
- Owen Quinn
- Alain Robert
- George Willig
