= Owen J. Quinn =

American man (born 1941)

Owen J. Quinn (born 1941 in the Bronx, New York) is an American man who was the first person to successfully parachute off one of the World Trade Center towers, on July 22, 1975.

== Early life ==
In an interview with C. J. Sullivan of the New York Press, Quinn claims that his first memories were of "how it all got bad very quick". His mother grew sick and was hospitalized for a long stretch of time and finances for the family were low, so his father had to place him and his sister in an orphanage for six years. Later on, when his mother got well, the family moved to Highbridge together. Even though things were looking up, they were still tough. Quinn got into trouble running the streets of Highbridge and hated school, so he began working at 15.

After traveling the world (twice), getting married in 1962, and a tour of duty with the Merchant Navy in Vietnam in 1966, Quinn decided to settle down after his first child was born, and went into construction. He soon got a job with the dock builders' union, working at the World Trade Center (WTC). He claims to have been inspired after seeing a model of the WTC, not paying much attention to the grandness of such an architectural achievement, but the great BASE jumping opportunity that it offered. By that time, Quinn had extensive experience with parachuting; he stated in an interview that "When I did it I loved it. I thought, when I die this is what I want to be doing."

== The jump ==
On July 22, 1975, with his friend Mike Sergio, Quinn disguised himself as a construction worker and hid his parachute in a duffel bag (covered with tools) and made his way up the North Tower of the World Trade Center. They were met by a security guard, and while Sergio distracted him, Quinn continued toward the roof and got into his parachute. Quinn says he "stepped back about 15 feet and ran fast right to the end". Sergio shot a picture and called it "The Point of No Return". Quinn wore a blue football jersey with the biblical verse, Matthew 19:26: "But Jesus beheld them and said unto them, with men this is impossible, but with God all things are possible".

When he landed, he was arrested by Port Authority Police and taken for psychiatric exams at two different hospitals, Elmhurst Hospital and St. Vincent's. While he was in the hospital, he told reporters that he jumped to draw attention the plight of the poor. “If people decided not to eat once a month and to send the money to the needy poor, then it would help the situation,” he said. When it was concluded that he was in fact sane, he was booked and charged with trespassing, disorderly conduct, and reckless endangerment. Within the course of a year, Quinn made 19 appearances in court, but the case was eventually dropped.

On June 22, 1977, Quinn appeared on the game show To Tell The Truth.

== See also ==
- BASE jumping
- Harry Gardiner
- Dan Goodwin
- Ivan Kristoff
- Philippe Petit
- Alain Robert
- George Willig
