= Jim Moore (photographer) =

American photographer

Jim Moore is an American photographer who has documented the variety arts since the 1970s. His photographs helped Philippe Petit plan his tightrope-walking stunt between the Twin Towers of the World Trade Center in 1974 and were prominently featured in the Oscar-winning film Man on Wire.

== Life and career ==
Moore studied film at New York University, but found a new calling in corporeal mime when he decided to take classes at the American Mime Theatre. After graduation, he put filmmaking aside and continued taking classes with teachers including Sterling Jensen, a partner of Étienne Decroux. Eventually, he began performing in the street and founded Hudson Street Studio to promote the variety arts. He also began photographing his performer friends at the time, and became a regular contributor to the pioneering rock magazine Crawdaddy!, photographing the Allman Brothers and the Grateful Dead at Summer Jam at Watkins Glen, as well as Jethro Tull, the Rolling Stones, John McLaughlin, Fairport Convention, and Traffic.

In 1974, he accompanied one of his friends, highwire artist Philippe Petit, to the World Trade Center, where he took numerous photographs that helped Petit plan his guerilla tightrope walk between the Twin Towers of the World Trade Center. Moore's photographs were featured in Petit's books On the High Wire (1985) and To Reach the Clouds (2002), and were integral to the 2009 Academy Award-winning documentary Man on Wire.

His photographs of clowns, jugglers, magicians, aerialists, ventriloquists, circus performers, and burlesque dancers have been seen in the New York Times, the Village Voice, various international publications and several books, including Nothing's Impossible! Stunts to Entertain and Amaze by the magician Jeff Sheridan. His work has also been exhibited at the New York Public Library, Lincoln Center for the Performing Arts, New York's Ohio Theater and Soho art galleries. He was the photographer in residence for the American Mime Theatre from 1975 to 2011 and frequently photographs performances at Dixon Place and Coney Island USA.

Moore wrote and filmed the silent short experimental film The Ridiculous Romantic, which won Best Silent Film at the Coney Island Film Festival in 2012. In 2013, he received a DeWitt Stern Local Hero Award from the Alliance of Resident Theatres.
