= Skyper =

Building complex in the Bahnhofsviertel district of Frankfurt, Germany

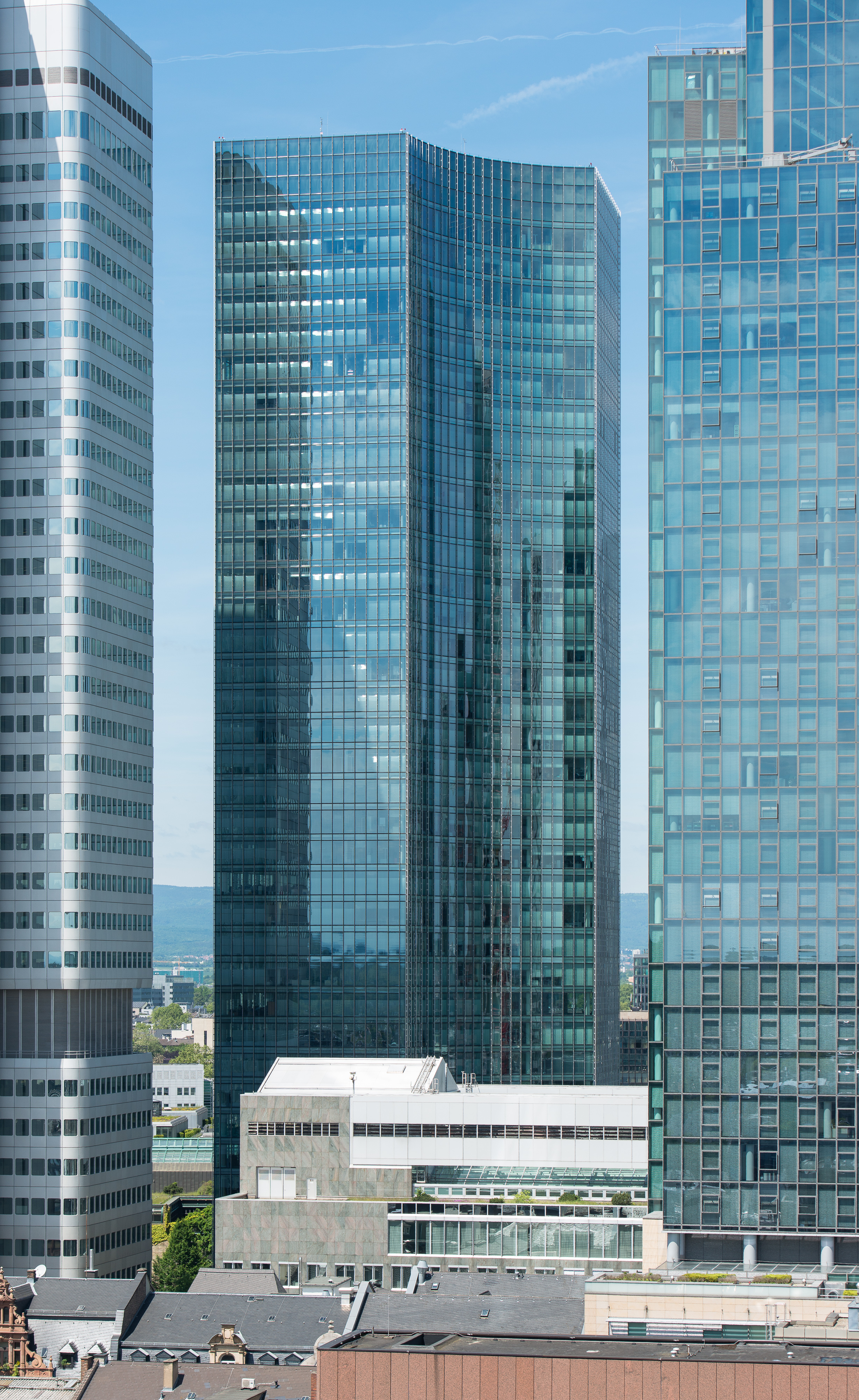
- Interactive map of the Skyper area

General information
- Type: Commercial offices Residential
- Location: Taunusanlage 1; Frankfurt; Hesse, Germany
- Coordinates: 50°06′36″N 8°40′09″E
- Construction started: 2002
- Completed: 2005
- Cost: €480 million

Height
- Roof: 153.8 m (505 ft); 20 m (66 ft) Skyper Carré

Technical details
- Floor count: 38; 6 Skyper Carré
- Floor area: 45,880 m^{2} (493,800 sq ft) (41,000 m^{2} (440,000 sq ft) rentable)
- Lifts/elevators: 17

Design and construction
- Architect: JSK
- Engineer: König, Heunisch und Partner (KHP); Remmel+Sattler Ingenieurgesellschaft mbH (RSP)
- Main contractor: Müller-Altvatter Bauunternehmung GmbH & Co. KG

Skyper is a building complex in the Bahnhofsviertel district of Frankfurt, Germany. The tallest of the three buildings is a 38-story, 154 m (505 ft) skyscraper. Its quarter-circular silhouette is a distinctive part of the Frankfurt cityscape.

Completed in 2004, the tower is linked by a 9 m (30 ft) glass atrium to a neo-classical villa dating from 1915. The villa is listed as a building of historical importance and once belonged, along with the site as a whole, to the Philipp Holzmann construction group, which used the property as its corporate head office. A residential and commercial building with 52 one- to three-room apartments and ground-floor retail space completes the ensemble.

The plans for the €480 million project originated from Frankfurt architects JSK, who were commissioned by Holzmann AG. With building approval granted, the architects subsequently realised their plans on behalf of general contractors ABG and the new owner, DekaBank, which had purchased the building for an open real estate fund of its real estate subsidiary, Deka Immobilien. Following completion in 2005, DekaBank moved into offices on the lower floors as the main tenant. The higher floors of the building are occupied by well-known names such as HSBC and Houlihan Lokey.

Skyper has been owned since 2006 by an investment company belonging to the Swiss banking group UBS.

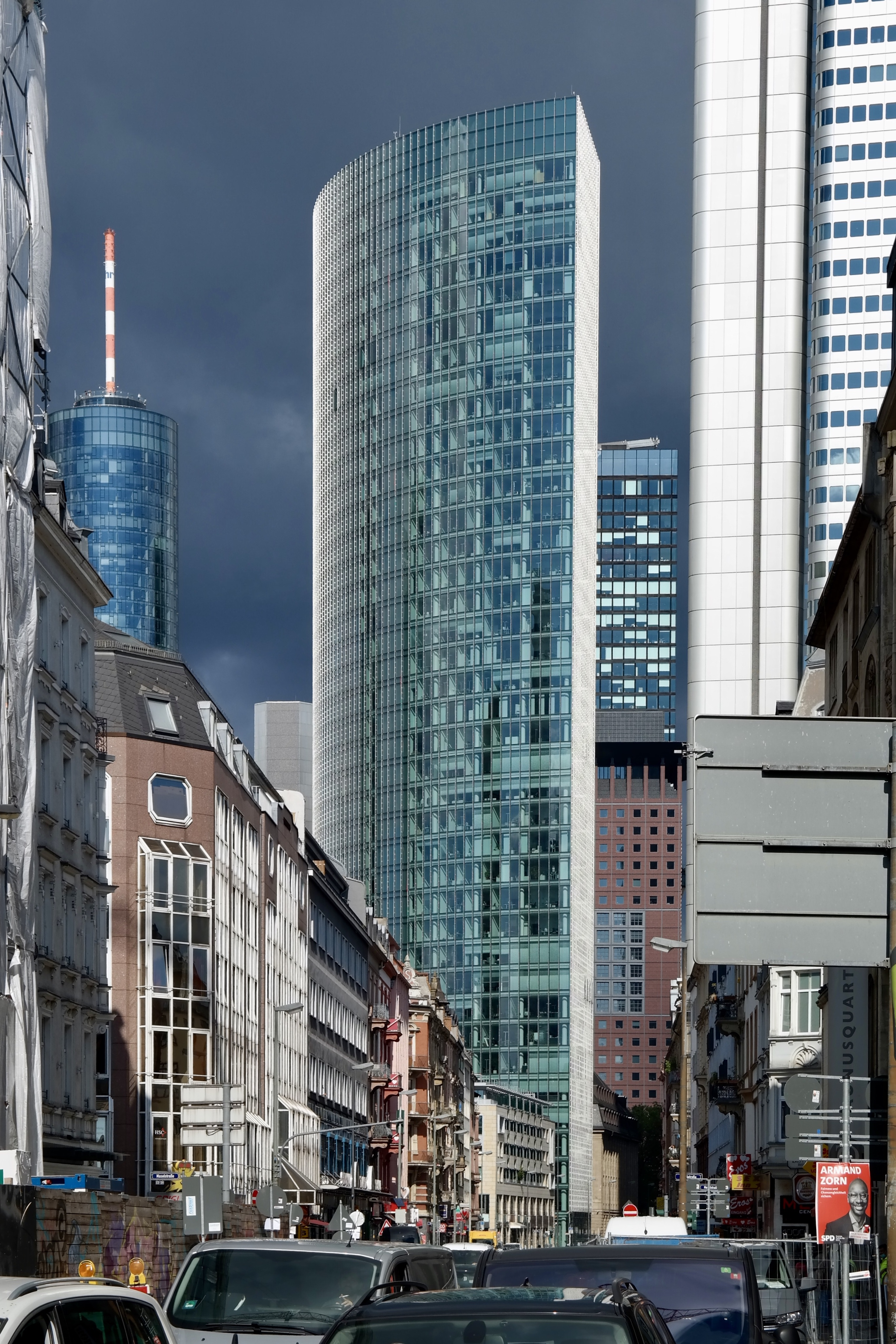
Skyper as seen from the south west

== See also ==
- List of tallest buildings in Frankfurt
- List of tallest buildings in Germany
- List of tallest buildings in Europe
