= West Thornton =

Coordinates: 51.391°N 0.121°W

- ward for Croydon Council
- Boundary of West Thornton in Croydon from 2018.
- County: Greater London

Current ward
- Created: 1965
- Councillor: Janet Campbell (Labour)
- Councillor: Stuart King (Labour)
- Councillor: Chrishni Reshekaron (Labour)
- Number of councillors: Three
- UK Parliament constituency: Croydon West

West Thornton is a ward in the London Borough of Croydon, covering part of the Thornton Heath area. The first election held under the new ward boundaries was the 2018 Croydon Council election.

== List of Councillors ==
Election	Councillor	Party	Councillor	Party	Councillor	Party
1965	Ward created					
1965	R. Tilbury	Conservative Resident	E. J. Fowler	Conservative Resident	E. F. A. Whitehorn	Conservative Resident
1971	C. J. Mitchell	Labour	D. A. Herriott	Labour	A. J. Simanowitz	Labour
1974	S. J. Stewart	Conservative	D. R. Loughborough	Conservative	Mrs Yvonne A. L. Stewart	Conservative
1978	Ernest G. Noad	Conservative	Iris S. Rodda	Conservative	Mrs Yvonne A. L. Stewart	Conservative
1982	Eric W. Howell	Conservative	Anita C. Drummond-Brown	Conservative	Mrs Yvonne A. L. Stewart	Conservative
1986	Maggie R. Mansell	Labour	David R. Evans	Labour	Gee E. Bernard	Labour
1990	Clarence McKenzie	Labour	Elaine A. Gibbon	Labour	Gee E. Bernard	Labour
1998	Clarence McKenzie	Labour	Raj Chandarana	Labour	Gee E. Bernard	Labour
2002	Bernadette Khan	Labour	Raj Chandarana	Labour	Martin A. Tiedemann	Labour
2006	Bernadette Khan	Labour	Raj Chandarana	Labour	Mike Mogul	Labour
2008	Bernadette Khan	Labour	Raj Chandarana	Labour	Mike Mogul	Conservative
2010	Bernadette Khan	Labour	Paul Smith	Labour	Humayun Kabir	Labour
2014	Bernadette Khan	Labour	Emily Benn	Labour	Stuart T. King	Labour
2016	Bernadette Khan	Labour	Callton Young	Labour	Stuart T. King	Labour
2018	Bernadette Khan	Labour	Janet Campbell	Labour	Stuart T. King	Labour
2022	Chrishni Reshekaron	Labour	Janet Campbell	Labour	Stuart T. King	Labour
2026	Rym Daoud	Labour	Janet Campbell	Labour	Stuart T. King	Labour

== Mayoral election results ==
Below are the results for the candidate which received the highest share of the popular vote in the ward at each mayoral election.

Year	Mayoral candidate	Party	Winner?
2022	Val Shawcross	Labour	✗

== Ward Results ==
Croydon Council Election 2026: West Thornton (3)
Party	Candidate	Votes	%	±%
Labour	Janet Campbell*	1,765	40.3	−25.9
Labour	Rym Daoud	1,368	31.2	
Labour	Stuart King*	1,305	29.8	−31.5
Liberal Democrats	Jahir Hussain	915	20.9	
Green	Hannah George	797	18.2	
Green	Amber Ritson	780	17.8	
Green	Barry Buttigieg	751	17.1	
Conservative	Colin Humphrey	716	16.3	
Conservative	Sachin Mithia	693	15.8	
Conservative	Patrick Ratnaraja	643	14.7	−13.9
Reform	Barry Izzard	456	10.4	
Reform	Malcolm Lewis	439	10.0	
Reform	Kaleem Khan	393	9.0	
Liberal Democrats	Hilary Waterhouse	383	8.7	
Turnout		4,384	33.70	+6.55
Labour hold		Swing		
Labour hold		Swing		
Labour hold		Swing		

Croydon Council Election 2022: West Thornton (3)
Party	Candidate	Votes	%	±%
Labour	Janet Campbell*	1,896		
Labour	Stuart King*	1,755		
Labour	Chrishni Reshekaron	1,684		
Conservative	Patrick Ratnaraja	818		
Conservative	Tom Lott	803		
Conservative	Abdul Talukdar	595		
Green	Barry Buttigieg	418		
Green	Rosalyn Mott	407		
Taking the Initiative	Ben Andoh	218		
Turnout		3,408	27.15	
Labour hold		Swing		
Labour hold		Swing		
Labour hold		Swing		

Croydon Council Election 2018: West Thornton (3)
Party	Candidate	Votes	%	±%
Labour	Janet Georgia Campbell	2,978	27.54	
Labour	Bernadette Khan	2,716	25.12	
Labour	Stuart Thomas King	2,640	24.42	
Conservative	Dominic John Schofield	653	6.04	
Conservative	Alasdair Stewart	621	5.74	
Conservative	Matin Talukdar	563	5.21	
Green	Eileen Diane Gale	364	3.37	
Green	Barry Phillip Buttigieg	278	2.57	
Majority		1,987	18.38	
Turnout				
Labour hold		Swing		
Labour hold		Swing		
Labour hold		Swing		

West Thornton by-election, 5 May 2016
Party	Candidate	Votes	%	±%
Labour	Callton Young	3,136	64.7	+2.0
Conservative	Scott Roche	989	20.4	+3.0
Green	David Beall	289	6.0	−2.5
UKIP	Ace Nnorom	145	3.0	−5.0
Liberal Democrats	Geoff Morley	140	2.9	−0.5
Independence from Europe	Peter Morgan	77	1.6	N/A
English Democrat	Winston McKenzie	70	1.4	N/A
Majority		2,147	44.3	
Turnout			44	
Labour hold		Swing		

The by-election was triggered by the resignation of Councillor Emily Benn to pursue a job in New York City, United States

Croydon Council Election 2014: West Thornton (3)
Party	Candidate	Votes	%	±%
Labour	Emily Benn	2,461		
Labour	Bernadette Khan	2,371		
Labour	Stuart King	2,243		
Conservative	Florence Evans	684		
Conservative	Samir Dwesar	650		
Conservative	Patrick Ratnaraja	595		
Green	David Beall	331		
UKIP	William Thomas	312		
UKIP	Marjorie Bissick	298		
Green	Barry Buttigieg	213		
Green	Rebecca Parnell	207		
Liberal Democrats	Patricia Knight	134		
Majority				
Turnout				
Labour hold		Swing		
Labour hold		Swing		
Labour hold		Swing		

Croydon Council Election 2010: West Thornton (3)
Party	Candidate	Votes	%	±%
Labour	Paul Smith	3,736		
Labour	Bernadette Khan	3,694		
Labour	Humayun Kabir	3,658		
Conservative	Simon Brew	1,611		
Conservative	Jacqueline Purcell	1,486		
Conservative	Selva Jeyadeva	1,418		
Liberal Democrats	Lucy N. Njomo	958		
Green	David T. Beall	620		
Green	Kiran J. Datta	392		
Green	Barry Buttigieg	345		
Communist	Ben Stevenson	80		
Turnout		6,656	57.6	
Registered electors		11,547		
Labour hold		Swing		
Labour hold		Swing		
Labour hold		Swing		

Croydon Council Election 2006: West Thornton (3)
Party	Candidate	Votes	%	±%
Labour	Raj Chandarana	1,660		
Labour	Bernadette Khan	1,521		
Labour	Mike Mogul	1,387		
Conservative	Christina Blair	1,115		
Conservative	Mehmet Bezginsoy	919		
Conservative	Bilgin Duven	916		
Liberal Democrats	Mahmud Ahsanollah	590		
Green	Santheya Natarajan	539		
Turnout		3,386	31.4%	
Registered electors		10,790		
Labour hold		Swing		
Labour hold		Swing		
Labour hold		Swing		

Croydon Council Election 2002: West Thornton (3)
Party	Candidate	Votes	%	±%
Labour	Raj Chandarana	1,691		
Labour	Bernadette Khan	1,547		
Labour	Martin A. Tiedemann	1,506		
Conservative	George A. Fibley	704		
Conservative	Parshotam L. Bhagat	675		
Conservative	Christopher P. Leese	586		
Liberal Democrats	Saeed A. Malik	313		
Liberal Democrats	Christopher A. Reilly	306		
Liberal Democrats	Susan L. Watson	296		
Majority				
Turnout				
Labour hold		Swing		
Labour hold		Swing		
Labour hold		Swing		

Croydon Council Election 1998: West Thornton (3)
Party	Candidate	Votes	%	±%
Labour	Clarence A. McKenzie	1,449		
Labour	Gwendolyn E. Bernard	1,408		
Labour	Raj Chandarana	1,363		
Conservative	Roger C. Taylor	913		
Conservative	Parshotam L. Bhagat	868		
Conservative	Vinita Bearman	815		
Majority				
Turnout				
Registered electors				
Labour hold		Swing		
Labour hold		Swing		
Labour hold		Swing		

Croydon Council Election 1994: West Thornton (3)
Party	Candidate	Votes	%	±%
Labour	Elaine A. Gibbon	2,354		
Labour	Clarence A. McKenzie	2,284		
Labour	Gwendolyn E. Bernard	2,230		
Conservative	Alan E. Aylmer	1,152		
Conservative	Roger C. Taylor	1,115		
Conservative	Eileen P. Seaborn	1,075		
Liberal Democrats	Henry Russell	564		
Majority		1,078		
Turnout				
Registered electors				
Labour hold		Swing		
Labour hold		Swing		
Labour hold		Swing		

Croydon Council Election 1990: West Thornton (3)
Party	Candidate	Votes	%	±%
Labour	Gwendolyn E. Bernard	2,246		
Labour	Clarence A. McKenzie	2,145		
Labour Co-op	Elaine A. Gibbon	1,809		
Conservative	Alan E. Aylmer	1,445		
Conservative	Sarah M. Pelling	1,306		
Conservative	Yvonne A. L. Stewart	1,225		
Liberal Democrats	Simon L. Held	631		
Majority		364		
Turnout				
Registered electors				
Labour hold		Swing		
Labour hold		Swing		
Labour Co-op hold		Swing		

Croydon Council Election 1986: West Thornton (3)
Party	Candidate	Votes	%	±%
Labour	Margaret R. Mansell	1,954		
Labour	David R. Evans	1,932		
Labour	Gwendolyn E. Bernard	1,834		
Conservative	Stephen J. Stewart	1,386		
Conservative	Eric W. Howell	1,357		
Conservative	Yvonne A. L. Stewart	1,320		
Liberal	Janet R. Pitt	922		
Alliance	Alan J. Holder	823		
Alliance	Graham F. Williams	763		
Majority		448		
Turnout				
Registered electors				
Labour gain from Conservative		Swing		
Labour gain from Conservative		Swing		
Labour gain from Conservative		Swing		

Croydon Council Election 1982: West Thornton (3)
Party	Candidate	Votes	%	±%
Conservative	Eric W. Howell	1,771		
Conservative	Yvonne A. L. Stewart	1,738		
Conservative	Anita C. Drummond-Brown	1,715		
Labour	Margaret R. Mansell	1,310		
Alliance	Alan R. Mead	1,170		
Labour	James J. Penman	1,135		
Alliance	Peter R. Norwood	1,090		
Labour	Arnold J. Simanwitz	1,044		
Alliance	David R. Dayus	1,017		
Majority		405		
Turnout				
Registered electors				
Conservative hold		Swing		
Conservative hold		Swing		
Conservative hold		Swing		

Croydon Council Election 1978: West Thornton (3)
Party	Candidate	Votes	%	±%
Conservative	Yvonne A. L. Stewart	2,017		
Conservative	Ernest G. Noad	1,923		
Conservative	Iris S. Rodda	1,878		
Labour	Stanley J. Boden	1,788		
Labour	Michael P. Rix	1,733		
Labour Co-op	Bernadette R. Supiramaniam	1,457		
Liberal	William H. Pitt	490		
Liberal	Janet R. Pitt	452		
Liberal	David R. Dayus	388		
Majority		90		
Turnout				
Registered electors				
Conservative hold		Swing		
Conservative hold		Swing		
Conservative hold		Swing		

Croydon Council Election 1974: West Thornton (3)
Party	Candidate	Votes	%	±%
Conservative	S. J. Stewart	1,613		
Conservative	D. R. Loughborough	1,573		
Conservative	Mrs Y. A. L. Stewart	1,536		
Labour	D. A. Herriott	1,464		
Labour	M. P. Rix	1,439		
Labour	Mrs E. E. Daisley	1,418		
Liberal	R. M. Greenhalgh	725		
Liberal	J. A. Pile-Gray	639		
Liberal	R. G. Rawcliffe	623		
Majority		72		
Turnout			37.0	▼3.1%
Registered electors		10,570		
Conservative gain from Labour		Swing		
Conservative gain from Labour		Swing		
Conservative gain from Labour		Swing		

Croydon Council Election 1971: West Thornton (3)
Party	Candidate	Votes	%	±%
Labour	C. J. Mitchell	2,333		
Labour	D. A. Herriott	2,229		
Labour	A. J. Simanowitz	2,198		
Conservative	R. Tilbury	1,865		
Conservative	S. J. Stewart	1,838		
Conservative	E. J. Fowler	1,835		
Turnout			40.1	▲7.7%
Registered electors		10,760		
Labour gain from Conservative Resident		Swing		
Labour gain from Conservative Resident		Swing		
Labour gain from Conservative Resident		Swing		

Croydon Council Election 1968: West Thornton (3)
Party	Candidate	Votes	%	±%
Conservative Resident	R. Tilbury	2,533		
Conservative Resident	E.F.A. Whitehorn	2,491		
Conservative Resident	E.J. Fowler	2,487		
Labour	Miss L.L. Scott	769		
Labour	G.E. Mitchell	740		
Labour	G.A. Bristow	719		
Turnout			32.4	▼11.2%
Registered electors		10,526		
Conservative Resident hold		Swing		
Conservative Resident hold		Swing		
Conservative Resident hold		Swing		

Croydon Council Election 1964: West Thornton (3)
Party	Candidate	Votes	%	±%
Conservative Resident	R. Tilbury	2,348		
Conservative Resident	E. J. Fowler	2,346		
Conservative Resident	E. F. A. Whitehorn	2,346		
Labour	Miss L. L. Scott	2,263		
Labour	T. Harris	2,127		
Labour	F. Bailey	2,125		
Turnout		4,708	43.6	
Registered electors		11,632		
Conservative Resident win (new seat)				
Conservative Resident win (new seat)				
Conservative Resident win (new seat)				
