= Thornton Heath (ward) =

- ward for Croydon Council
- Boundary of Thornton Heath in Croydon from 2018.
- County: Greater London

Current ward
- Created: 1965
- Councillor: Karen Jewitt (Labour)
- Councillor: Tamar Nwafor (Labour)
- Councillor: Callton Young (Labour)
- Number of councillors: Three
- UK Parliament constituency: Streatham and Croydon North

Thornton Heath is a ward in the London Borough of Croydon. The ward covers part of the Thornton Heath Area. The first election held under the new boundaries was the 2018 Croydon Council Election.

== List of Councillors ==
Election	Councillor	Party	Councillor	Party	Councillor	Party
1965	Ward created					
1965	S. Sutcliffe	Labour	M. E. Mackenzie	Labour	J. L. Walker	Labour
1968	John G. Davies	Residents Association	G. A. Barr	Residents Association	F. S. Martin	Residents Association
1971	G. E. Mitchell	Labour	R. Rosser	Labour	N. A. Tully	Labour
1974	P. T. Chandler	Residents Association	John G. Davies	Residents Association	William Blackwood	Residents Association
1978	Gordon Poluck	Residents Association	John G. Davies	Residents Association	William Blackwood	Residents Association
1986	Adrian S. Dennis	Labour	Wallace W. Garratt	Labour	Leni Gillman	Labour
1990	Adrian S. Dennis	Labour	Wallace W. Garratt	Labour	Trevor J. Laffin	Labour
1994	Adrian S. Dennis	Labour	Wallace W. Garratt	Labour	Raj Chandarana	Labour
1998	Adrian S. Dennis	Labour	Wallace W. Garratt	Labour	Patricia Clouder	Labour
2002	Adrian S. Dennis	Labour	Louisa P. Woodley	Labour	Patricia Clouder	Labour
2006	Matthew Kyeremeh	Labour	Louisa P. Woodley	Labour	Patricia Clouder	Labour
2014	Matthew Kyeremeh	Labour	Karen Jewitt	Labour	Patricia Clouder	Labour
2018	Callton Young	Labour	Karen Jewitt	Labour	Patricia Clouder	Labour
2022	Callton Young	Labour	Karen Jewitt	Labour	Tamar Nwafor	Labour

== Mayoral election results ==
Below are the results for the candidate which received the highest share of the popular vote in the ward at each mayoral election.

Year	Mayoral candidate	Party	Winner?
2022	Val Shawcross	Labour	✗

== Ward Results ==
=== Thornton Heath ===
Croydon Council Election 2022: Thornton Heath (3)
Party	Candidate	Votes	%	±%
Labour	Karen Jewitt*	2,021	75.9%	
Labour	Tamar Nwafor	1,789	67.2%	
Labour	Callton Young*	1,539	57.8%	
Conservative	Richard Harris	681	25%	9
Conservative	John Tipton	600		
Independent	Louise Perry	592		
Conservative	Folarin Bamgbopa	553		
Green	Marian Hoffman	549		
Liberal Democrats	Andrew Barrett	546		
Green	Ian Bradler	496		
Green	Angus Hewlett	400		
Taking the Initiative	Jillette Marquis	183		
Taking the Initiative	Hanan Lamaallam	180		
Taking the Initiative	Jason McLean	122		
Turnout		3,758	30.24	
Labour hold		Swing		
Labour hold		Swing		
Labour hold		Swing		

Croydon Council Election 2018: Thornton Heath (3)
Party	Candidate	Votes	%	±%
Labour Co-op	Pat Clouder	2,991	25.61	
Labour Co-op	Karen Jewitt	2,722	23.31	
Labour Co-op	Callton Young	2,458	21.05	
Conservative	Peter Anike	670	5.74	
Conservative	Aaliyah Brown	574	4.92	
Conservative	Shantelle Francis	570	4.88	
Green	Kirsty Bluck	374	3.20	
Green	Mark Lord	354	3.03	
Liberal Democrats	Michael Hunter	271	2.32	
Green	Matt Wilcock	191	1.64	
Liberal Democrats	Jean Pierre Ivanov	182	1.56	
Liberal Democrats	Martin Hammond	177	1.52	
Duma Polska=Polish Pride	Malgorzata Roznerska	144	1.23	
Majority		1,788	15.31	
Turnout				
Labour hold		Swing		
Labour hold		Swing		
Labour hold		Swing		

Croydon Council Election 2014: Thornton Heath (3)
Party	Candidate	Votes	%	±%
Labour Co-op	Pat Clouder	2,340		
Labour Co-op	Matthew Kyeremeh	2,040		
Labour Co-op	Karen Jewitt	2,023		
Conservative	Nicholas Bailey	545		
Conservative	Luke Springthorpe	445		
Conservative	David Osland	444		
UKIP	Emmanuel Ehrim	392		
UKIP	Anne-Michelle Gardner	388		
Green	Christine Wade	336		
Green	Rachel Kenny-Green	308		
Green	Stefan Szczelkun	295		
Independent	Dwain Coward	171		
Liberal Democrats	Maria Menezes	162		
Liberal Democrats	Geoffrey Morley	134		
TUSC	Glen Hart	92		
Majority				
Turnout				
Labour Co-op hold		Swing		
Labour Co-op hold		Swing		
Labour Co-op hold		Swing		

Croydon Council Election 2006: Thornton Heath (3)
Party	Candidate	Votes	%	±%
Labour	Pat Clouder	1,644		
Labour	Matthew Kyeremeh	1,427		
Labour	Louisa Woodley	1,421		
Conservative	Florence Evans	902		
Conservative	Melanie Hutchens	833		
Liberal Democrats	Jonathan Cope	819		
Conservative	Michele O'Connell	776		
Liberal Democrats	Stephen Dering	697		
Liberal Democrats	Tomas Howard-Jones	638		
Turnout		3,445	31.5%	
Registered electors		10,920		
Labour hold		Swing		
Labour hold		Swing		
Labour hold		Swing		

Croydon Council Election 2002: Thornton Heath (3)
Party	Candidate	Votes	%	±%
Labour	Patricia Clouder	1,794		
Labour	Adrian S. Dennis	1,759		
Labour	Louisa P. Woodley	1,648		
Conservative	Malcolm Felberg	757		
Conservative	Andrew R. Price	691		
Conservative	David H. Young	662		
Liberal Democrats	Beryl R. Pocock	376		
Liberal Democrats	Elaine Fillingham	373		
Liberal Democrats	Christopher M. Pocock	334		
Independent	Ronald G. Dalton	234		
Independent	Shabir Ismail	173		
Majority				
Turnout				
Labour hold		Swing		
Labour hold		Swing		
Labour hold		Swing		

Croydon Council Election 1998: Thornton Heath (3)
Party	Candidate	Votes	%	±%
Labour	Patricia Clouder	1,682		
Labour	Adrian S. Dennis	1,595		
Labour	Wallace W. Garratt	1,571		
Conservative	Peter C.D. Davis	694		
Conservative	Andrew C.G. Millard	638		
Conservative	Jane Parker	638		
Liberal Democrats	John Cornell	331		
Liberal Democrats	Geoffrey Morley	309		
Liberal Democrats	Beryl R. Pocock	307		
Majority				
Turnout				
Registered electors				
Labour hold		Swing		
Labour hold		Swing		
Labour hold		Swing		

Croydon Council Election 1994: Thornton Heath (3)
Party	Candidate	Votes	%	±%
Labour	Adrian S. Dennis	2,363		
Labour	Wallace W. Garratt	2,274		
Labour	Raj Chandarana	2,182		
Conservative	Robert G. Oliver	1,175		
Conservative	Bernard K. Ampaw	1,078		
Majority		1,007		
Turnout				
Registered electors				
Labour hold		Swing		
Labour hold		Swing		
Labour hold		Swing		

Croydon Council Election 1990: Thornton Heath (3)
Party	Candidate	Votes	%	±%
Labour	Adrian S. Dennis	2,146		
Labour	Wallace W. Garratt	2,013		
Labour	Trevor J. Laffin	1,882		
Conservative	Eric W. Howell	1,400		
Conservative	Bernard K. Ampaw	1,336		
Conservative	Catherine M. C. Wunn	1,282		
Green	Andrew H. Ellis	414		
Liberal Democrats	Helen M. Wallace	339		
Liberal Democrats	Julie Hardy-McBride	327		
Liberal Democrats	Beryl R. Pocock	313		
Majority		482		
Turnout				
Registered electors				
Labour hold		Swing		
Labour hold		Swing		
Labour hold		Swing		

Croydon Council Election 1986: Thornton Heath (3)
Party	Candidate	Votes	%	±%
Labour	Adrian S. Dennis	1,871		
Labour	Wallace W. Garratt	1,860		
Labour	Leni Gillman	1,726		
Residents	John G. Davies	1,378		
Residents	John C. Morgan	1,332		
Residents	Phyllis A. Stelling	1,252		
Liberal	Peter C. Davies	644		
Alliance	Meem Y. Sheen	534		
Alliance	Katherine M. Chadderton	524		
Majority		348		
Turnout				
Registered electors				
Labour gain from Residents		Swing		
Labour gain from Residents		Swing		
Labour gain from Residents		Swing		

Croydon Council Election 1982: Thornton Heath (3)
Party	Candidate	Votes	%	±%
Residents	John G. Davies	1,705		
Residents	Gordon Poluck	1,664		
Residents	William Blackwood	1,539		
Labour	Patrick Byrne	1,006		
Labour	Frances M. Conn	912		
Labour	Herbert W. Tyler	909		
Alliance	Clive Bone	741		
Alliance	William G. A. Graham	732		
Alliance	Julia S. Gordon	695		
Majority		533		
Turnout				
Registered electors				
Residents hold		Swing		
Residents hold		Swing		
Residents hold		Swing		

Croydon Council Election 1978: Thornton Heath (3)
Party	Candidate	Votes	%	±%
Residents	John G. Davies	2,283		
Residents	William Blackwood	2,265		
Residents	Gordon Poluck	2,198		
Labour	Kenneth J. Kinnard	1,296		
Labour	Susan E. Lord	1,243		
Labour	Mushtaq Ahmad	1,145		
Majority		902		
Turnout				
Registered electors				
Residents hold		Swing		
Residents hold		Swing		
Residents hold		Swing		

Croydon Council Election 1974: Thornton Heath (3)
Party	Candidate	Votes	%	±%
Residents	P. T. Chandler	1,925		
Residents	J. G. Davies	1,902		
Residents	W. Blackwood	1,840		
Labour	N. A. Tully	1,696		
Labour	A. F. Rowe	1,693		
Labour	J. L. Walker	1,682		
Communist	Mrs M. I. Lenehan	139		
Majority		144		
Turnout			36.0	▼1.5%
Registered electors		10,589		
Residents gain from Labour		Swing		
Residents gain from Labour		Swing		
Residents gain from Labour		Swing		

Croydon Council Election 1971: Thornton Heath (3)
Party	Candidate	Votes	%	±%
Labour	G. E. Mitchell	2,100		
Labour	R. Rosser	2,001		
Labour	N. A. Tully	1,989		
Residents	J. G. Davies	1,889		
Residents	P. T. Chandler	1,883		
Residents	W. Blackwood	1,821		
Libertarian Socialist	I. McNay	130		
Turnout			37.5	▲5.5%
Registered electors		10,991		
Labour gain from Residents		Swing		
Labour gain from Residents		Swing		
Labour gain from Residents		Swing		

Croydon Council Election 1968: Thornton Heath (3)
Party	Candidate	Votes	%	±%
Residents	J.G. Davies	2,371		
Residents	G.A. Barr	2,311		
Residents	F.S. Martin	2,304		
Labour	Mrs E. Sutcliffe	722		
Labour	S. Sutcliffe	716		
Labour	J.L. Walker	622		
Independent	M.E. Thomas	403		
Turnout			32.0	▼10.8%
Registered electors		10,465		
Residents gain from Labour		Swing		
Residents gain from Labour		Swing		
Residents gain from Labour		Swing		

Croydon Council Election 1964: Thornton Heath (3)
Party	Candidate	Votes	%	±%
Labour	S. Sutcliffe	2,168		
Labour	M. E. Mackenzie	2,127		
Labour	J. L. Walker	2,114		
Residents	J. G. Davies	2,031		
Residents	P. Chandler	2,024		
Residents	G. A. Barr	1,981		
Liberal	M. E. Pache	416		
Liberal	M. E. Thomas	401		
Liberal	D. B. Stannard	378		
Turnout		4,691	42.8	
Registered electors		10,952		
Labour win (new seat)				
Labour win (new seat)				
Labour win (new seat)				
