= Croydon London Borough Council elections =

Class of UK elections

A map showing the wards of Croydon from 2002 to 2018

Elections for the Croydon London Borough Council are held every four years to elect 70 councillors. The last ward boundary changes came into force at the 2018 local elections.

== Political control ==
The first elections to the council were held in 1964, ahead of the new system coming into full effect in 1965. Political control of the council since 1964 has been held by the following parties:

| Election | Council control | Conservative | Labour | Lib Dem | Greens | Others |
|---|---|---|---|---|---|---|
| 1964 | No overall control | 21 | 21 | - | - | 18 |
| 1968 | Conservative | 47 | 1 | 1 | - | 11 |
| 1971 | Conservative | 30 | 27 | - | - | 3 |
| 1974 | Conservative | 40 | 17 | - | - | 3 |
| 1978 | Conservative | 56 | 11 | - | - | 3 |
| 1982 | Conservative | 62 | 5 | - | - | 3 |
| 1986 | Conservative | 44 | 26 | - | - | - |
| 1990 | Conservative | 41 | 29 | - | - | - |
| 1994 | Labour | 30 | 40 | - | - | - |
| 1998 | Labour | 31 | 38 | 1 | - | - |
| 2002 | Labour | 32 | 37 | 1 | - | - |
| 2006 | Conservative | 43 | 27 | - | - | - |
| 2010 | Conservative | 37 | 33 | - | - | - |
| 2014 | Labour | 30 | 40 | - | - | - |
| 2018 | Labour | 29 | 41 | - | - | - |
| 2022 | No overall control | 33 (plus Mayor) | 34 | 1 | 2 | - |
| 2026 | No overall control | 28 (plus Mayor) | 30 | 2 | 8 | 2 |

== Council elections ==
- 1964 Croydon London Borough Council election
- 1968 Croydon London Borough Council election
- 1971 Croydon London Borough Council election (boundary changes took place but the number of seats remained the same) (Note: The Greater London, Kent and Surrey Order, 1968)
- 1974 Croydon London Borough Council election
- 1978 Croydon London Borough Council election (boundary changes increased the number of seats by ten)
- 1982 Croydon London Borough Council election
- 1986 Croydon London Borough Council election
- 1990 Croydon London Borough Council election
- 1994 Croydon London Borough Council election (boundary changes took place but the number of seats remained the same) (Note: The Greater London and Surrey (County and London Borough Boundaries) Order 1993) (Note: The Greater London and Surrey (County and London Borough Boundaries) (No. 3) Order 1993) (Note: The Bromley, Croydon, Lambeth, Lewisham and Southwark (London Borough Boundaries) Order 1993) (Note: The Croydon, Lambeth and Southwark (London Borough Boundaries) Order 1993)
- 1998 Croydon London Borough Council election (boundary changes took place but the number of seats remained the same) (Note: The Croydon, Merton and Sutton (London Borough Boundaries) Order 1993)
- 2002 Croydon London Borough Council election (boundary changes took place but the number of seats remained the same)
- 2006 Croydon London Borough Council election
- 2010 Croydon London Borough Council election
- 2014 Croydon London Borough Council election
- 2018 Croydon London Borough Council election (boundary changes took place but the number of seats remained the same)
- 2022 Croydon London Borough Council election (boundaries remained the same, but the introduction of the Mayor of Croydon increased the number of seats by 1)
- 2026 Croydon London Borough Council election

== Borough result maps ==
1978 results map

1982 results map

1986 results map

1990 results map

1994 results map

1998 results map

2002 results map

2006 results map

2010 results map

2014 results map

2018 results map

2022 results map

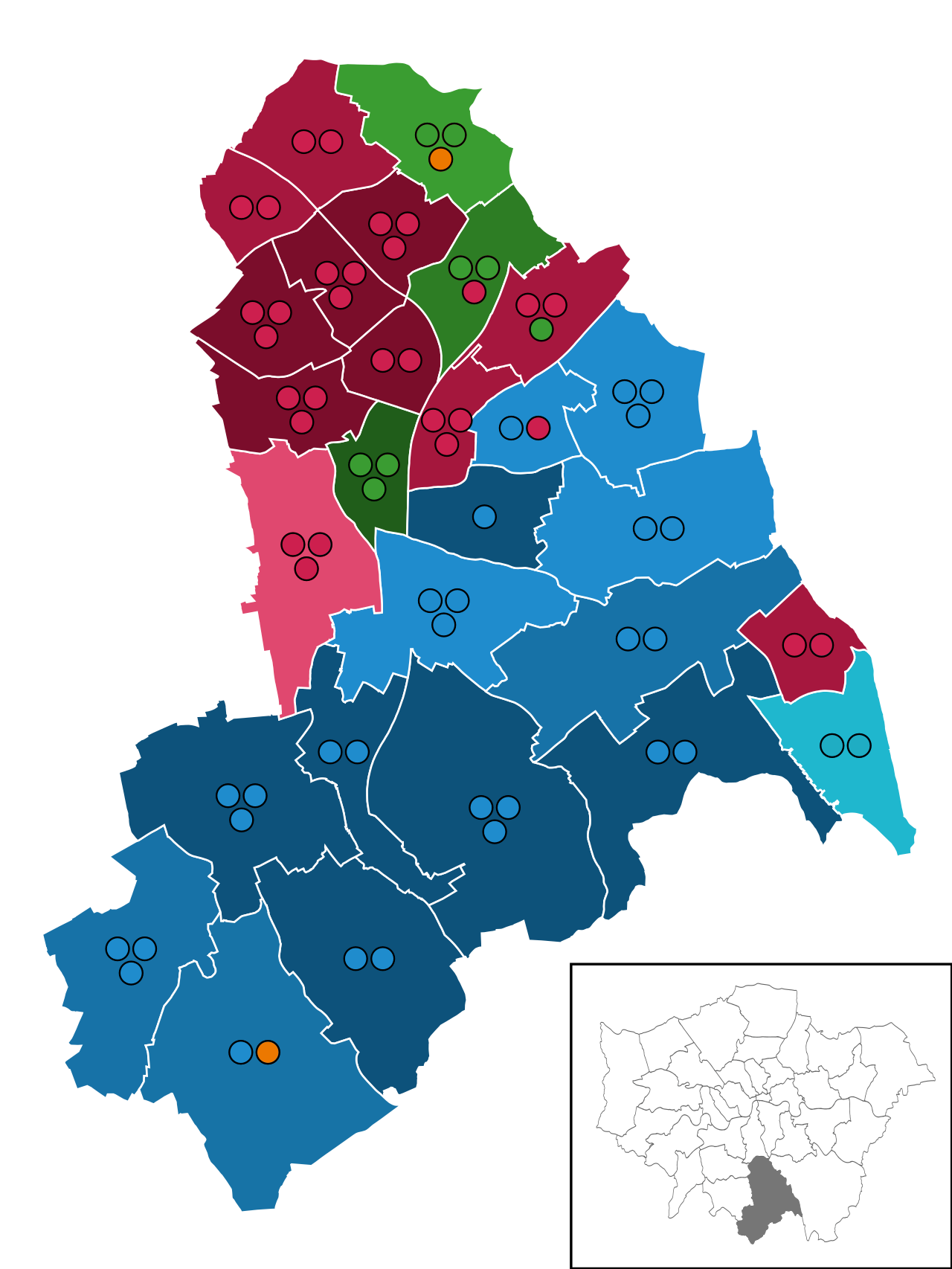
2026 results map

== Councillors by party ==
The party holding the executive Mayor, and as a result executive power, is the Conservative Party. No party holds a majority of Councillors. Since the 2022 Croydon London Borough Council election the composition of the Council is as follows:

| Party | Councillors |
|---|---|
| Conservative | 33 plus Mayor |
| Labour | 34 |
| Greens | 2 |
| Liberal Democrat | 1 |

== By-election results ==
=== 1964-1968 ===
There were no by-elections.

=== 1968-1971 ===
Purley by-election, 11 July 1968
| Party | Candidate | Votes | % | ±% |
|---|---|---|---|---|
| Conservative | M. E. Campbell | 1252 | | |
| Liberal | K. H. Legge | 247 | | |
| Labour | B. G. Hamblin | 116 | | |
| Turnout | | | 14.0% | |

Shirley by-election, 29 January 1970
| Party | Candidate | Votes | % | ±% |
|---|---|---|---|---|
| Conservative | F. R. Dubery | 2096 | | |
| Liberal | C. R. Chance | 368 | | |
| Labour | H. W. Robertson | 297 | | |
| Independent | J. T. E. A. Waddell | 161 | | |
| Turnout | | | 20.6% | |

=== 1971-1974 ===
Coulsdon East by-election, 30 September 1971
| Party | Candidate | Votes | % | ±% |
|---|---|---|---|---|
| Conservative | M. L. Bonsier | 1,752 | | |
| Liberal | J. P. Callen | 552 | | |
| Labour | P. A. Airey | 417 | | |
| Turnout | | | 25.3% | |

East by-election, 6 July 1972
| Party | Candidate | Votes | % | ±% |
|---|---|---|---|---|
| Conservative | A. W. Elliott | 1,709 | | |
| Labour | A. C. Lord | 1,578 | | |
| Independent | J. R. Simmonds | 1,221 | | |
| Turnout | | | 34.8% | |

Bensham Manor by-election, 5 October 1972
| Party | Candidate | Votes | % | ±% |
|---|---|---|---|---|
| Labour | W. M. Holt | 1,784 | | |
| Conservative | R. J. Bowker | 1,240 | | |
| Turnout | | | 27.2% | |

Addiscombe by-election, 2 August 1973
| Party | Candidate | Votes | % | ±% |
|---|---|---|---|---|
| Labour | M. M. Walker | 2,161 | | |
| Conservative | J. A. Arnold | 1,321 | | |
| Liberal | B. F. Steggles | 790 | | |
| Turnout | | | 38.2% | |

=== 1974-1978 ===
Whitehorse Manor by-election, 4 March 1976
| Party | Candidate | Votes | % | ±% |
|---|---|---|---|---|
| Conservative | Julia A. Wood | 1,123 | | |
| Labour | Audrey M. Simpson | 1,116 | | |
| Liberal | William H. Pitt | 466 | | |
| Turnout | | | 29.1 | |

Woodside by-election, 13 May 1976
| Party | Candidate | Votes | % | ±% |
|---|---|---|---|---|
| Conservative | David L. Congdon | 2,119 | | |
| Labour Co-op | Sinnathamby Supiramaniam | 1,303 | | |
| Liberal | Alan R. Mead | 423 | | |
| Turnout | | | 35.2 | |

Waddon by-election, 15 July 1976
| Party | Candidate | Votes | % | ±% |
|---|---|---|---|---|
| Conservative | James J. Nea | 2,225 | | |
| Labour | Barry V. Bulled | 1,756 | | |
| National Party | William H. Porter | 442 | | |
| National Front | John A. Fisher | 329 | | |
| Liberal | Roger W. Stephens | 221 | | |
| Independent | Charles J. De Val | 118 | | |
| Turnout | | | 41.8 | |

Coulsdon East by-election, 14 October 1976
| Party | Candidate | Votes | % | ±% |
|---|---|---|---|---|
| Conservative | Martin A. Levie | 1,502 | | |
| Liberal | Herbert C. E. Lovejoy | 1,009 | | |
| Labour | Roger M. Burgess | 163 | | |
| Turnout | | | 23.8 | |

Bensham Manor by-election, 10 March 1977
| Party | Candidate | Votes | % | ±% |
|---|---|---|---|---|
| Conservative | Christopher B. Wesson | 1,634 | | |
| Labour | Ralph W. Attoe | 1,519 | | |
| National Front | Roland Dummer | 234 | | |
| Turnout | | | 30.8 | |

Waddon by-election, 30 June 1977
| Party | Candidate | Votes | % | ±% |
|---|---|---|---|---|
| Conservative | Michael D. Wunn | 1,943 | | |
| Labour | Barry V. Bulled | 1,592 | | |
| Liberal | Patricia M. Boreham | 164 | | |
| National Party | William H. Porter | 154 | | |
| National Front | Roland Dummer | 124 | | |
| Turnout | | | 33.2 | |

=== 1986-1990 ===
Monks Orchard by-election, 30 April 1987
| Party | Candidate | Votes | % | ±% |
|---|---|---|---|---|
| Conservative | Audrey F F Cutbill | 2,035 | 59.6 | +0.2 |
| Liberal | Anthony R Phillips | 1,036 | 30.3 | +10.1 |
| Labour | David L Davies | 346 | 10.1 | −10.3 |
| Majority | | 999 | 29.3 | −9.7 |
| Turnout | | | 43.1 | |
| Conservative hold | | Swing | -5.0 | |

=== 1990-1994 ===
Coulsdon East by-election, 25 June 1992
| Party | Candidate | Votes | % | ±% |
|---|---|---|---|---|
| Conservative | Christine A. Prentice | 1,539 | 54.2 | |
| Liberal Democrats | John P. Callen | 1,087 | 38.3 | |
| Labour | Ian G. Payne | 213 | 7.5 | |
| Turnout | | | 29.1 | |
| Conservative hold | | Swing | | |

The by-election was called following the resignation of Cllr Susan Taylor.

Purley by-election, 25 June 1992
| Party | Candidate | Votes | % | ±% |
|---|---|---|---|---|
| Conservative | Graham J. Bass | 1,680 | 73.1 | |
| Liberal Democrats | Pamela A. Randall | 395 | 17.2 | |
| Labour | Val Shawcross | 224 | 9.7 | |
| Turnout | | | 20.4 | |
| Conservative hold | | Swing | | |

The by-election was called following the resignation of Cllr David Congdon.

Upper Norwood by-election, 19 November 1992
| Party | Candidate | Votes | % | ±% |
|---|---|---|---|---|
| Labour | Patrick T. Ryan | 1,306 | 55.1 | |
| Conservative | Guy L. Harding | 986 | 41.6 | |
| Liberal Democrats | Jonathan R. Cope | 79 | 3.3 | |
| Majority | | 320 | 13.5 | |
| Turnout | | 2,371 | 37.0 | |
| Labour gain from Conservative | | Swing | | |

The by-election was called following the death of Cllr John Yaxley.

Broad Green by-election, 29 April 1993
| Party | Candidate | Votes | % | ±% |
|---|---|---|---|---|
| Labour | Stuart Collins | 1,972 | 74.6 | |
| Conservative | Patricia F. L. Knight | 528 | 20.0 | |
| Liberal Democrats | David A. Holmes | 143 | 5.4 | |
| Majority | | 1,244 | 54.5 | |
| Turnout | | 2,643 | 30.2 | |
| Labour gain from Labour Co-op | | Swing | | |

The by-election was called following the resignation of Cllr Anthony Slatcher.

Waddon by-election, 12 August 1993
| Party | Candidate | Votes | % | ±% |
|---|---|---|---|---|
| Labour | Charles E. Burling | 1,389 | 43.7 | |
| Liberal Democrats | Henry J. Norton | 772 | 24.3 | |
| Conservative | Patricia F. L. Knight | 728 | 22.9 | |
| Independent Resident | Peter J. Collier | 213 | 6.7 | |
| Green | Phillip D. Duckworth | 79 | 2.5 | |
| Turnout | | | 31.6 | |
| Labour hold | | Swing | | |

The by-election was called following the resignation of Cllr Ann Allan.

=== 1994-1998 ===
Beulah by-election, 8 December 1994
| Party | Candidate | Votes | % | ±% |
|---|---|---|---|---|
| Labour | Hugh D. Malyan | 1,338 | 63.2 | |
| Conservative | Michael D. Fisher | 625 | 29.5 | |
| Liberal Democrats | Christopher M. Pocock | 132 | 6.2 | |
| Green | Bruce J. Horner | 21 | 1.0 | |
| Majority | | 713 | 33.7 | |
| Turnout | | 2,116 | 33.2 | |
| Labour hold | | Swing | | |

The by-election was called following the resignation of Cllr Sherwan Chowdhury.

Sanderstead by-election, 14 September 1995
| Party | Candidate | Votes | % | ±% |
|---|---|---|---|---|
| Conservative | Eric Shaw | 1712 | 52.6 | |
| Liberal Democrats | Gavin T. Howard-Jones | 970 | 29.8 | |
| Labour | Michael P. J. Phelan | 528 | 16.2 | |
| Green | Richard J. Hamlyn | 32 | 1.0 | |
| Ind Green Soc Dem | John S. Cartwright | 15 | 0.5 | |
| Majority | | 742 | 22.8 | |
| Turnout | | 3,257 | | |
| Conservative hold | | Swing | | |

The by-election was called following the death of Cllr Bruce Marshall.

Bensham Manor by-election, 17 October 1996
| Party | Candidate | Votes | % | ±% |
|---|---|---|---|---|
| Labour | Paula M. Shaw | 1,812 | 63.7 | |
| Conservative | John L. Tooze | 690 | 24.2 | |
| Liberal Democrats | John Fraser | 282 | 9.9 | |
| Green | Mario S. G. G. Barnsley | 38 | 1.3 | |
| Monster Raving Loony | John S. Cartwright | 25 | 0.9 | |
| Majority | | 1,122 | 39.5 | |
| Turnout | | 2,847 | 29.8 | |
| Labour hold | | Swing | | |

The by-election was called following the resignation of Cllr Alison Roberts.

New Addington by-election, 24 July 1997
| Party | Candidate | Votes | % | ±% |
|---|---|---|---|---|
| Labour | Christopher Ward | 755 | 59.8 | −10.6 |
| Conservative | Robin Sullivan | 367 | 29.1 | −0.6 |
| Liberal Democrats | Mark B. Goodrich | 97 | 7.7 | +7.7 |
| United Democratic Party | Paul T. Burgess | 29 | 2.3 | +2.3 |
| Monster Raving Loony | John S. Cartwright | 15 | 1.2 | +1.2 |
| Majority | | 388 | 30.7 | |
| Turnout | | 1,263 | 15.2 | |
| Labour hold | | Swing | | |

The by-election was called following the resignation of Cllr Geraint Davies.

=== 1998-2002 ===
Rylands by-election, 9 July 1998
| Party | Candidate | Votes | % | ±% |
|---|---|---|---|---|
| Labour | Louisa P. Woodley | 1,033 | 58.1 | −8.8 |
| Conservative | George A. Filbey | 623 | 35.0 | +1.9 |
| Liberal Democrats | Hilary J. Waterhouse | 102 | 5.7 | +5.7 |
| Monster Raving Loony | John S. Cartwright | 21 | 1.2 | +1.2 |
| Majority | | 410 | 23.1 | |
| Turnout | | 1,779 | | |
| Labour hold | | Swing | | |

The by-election was called following the resignation of Cllr Louisa Woodley.

New Addington by-election, 4 May 2000
| Party | Candidate | Votes | % | ±% |
|---|---|---|---|---|
| Labour | Brenda P. Kirby | 1,073 | 49.4 | −12.3 |
| Conservative | John R. Miller | 882 | 40.6 | +2.3 |
| Liberal Democrats | George W. Schlich | 153 | 7.1 | +7.1 |
| Monster Raving Loony | John S. Cartwright | 62 | 2.9 | +2.9 |
| Majority | | 191 | 8.8 | |
| Turnout | | 2,170 | 26.8 | |
| Labour hold | | Swing | | |

The by-election was called following the resignation of Cllr Val Shawcross.

=== 2002-2006 ===
Bensham Manor by-election, 10 June 2004
| Party | Candidate | Votes | % | ±% |
|---|---|---|---|---|
| Labour | Nanoo Rajendran | 1,935 | 50.7 | −20.9 |
| Conservative | John L. Tooze | 631 | 16.5 | −6.3 |
| Liberal Democrats | Ejnar Sorensen | 581 | 15.2 | +15.2 |
| UKIP | James R. Feisenberger | 328 | 8.6 | +3.0 |
| Green | Shasha Khan | 257 | 6.7 | +6.7 |
| Monster Raving Loony | John S. Cartwright | 44 | 1.2 | +1.2 |
| Independent | Robin J. M. Sullivan | 42 | 1.2 | +1.1 |
| Majority | | 1,304 | 34.2 | |
| Turnout | | 3,818 | 37.1 | |
| Labour hold | | Swing | | |

The by-election was called following the resignation of Cllr Alexander Burridge.

Fieldway by-election, 16 June 2005
| Party | Candidate | Votes | % | ±% |
|---|---|---|---|---|
| Labour | Simon A. Hall | 993 | 52.4 | −13.0 |
| Conservative | Anthony Pearson | 714 | 37.6 | +3.0 |
| Liberal Democrats | Simon E. Hargrave | 136 | 7.2 | +7.2 |
| UKIP | Lynnda Robson | 47 | 2.5 | +2.5 |
| Monster Raving Loony | John S. Cartwright | 6 | 0.3 | +0.3 |
| Majority | | 279 | 14.8 | |
| Turnout | | 1,896 | 28.0 | |
| Labour hold | | Swing | | |

The by-election was called following the death of Cllr Mary Walker.

Fairfield by-election, 15 December 2005
| Party | Candidate | Votes | % | ±% |
|---|---|---|---|---|
| Conservative | Vidhhyacharan R. Mohan | 1,459 | 54.0 | +7.8 |
| Labour | Peter N. Horah | 871 | 32.3 | −3.8 |
| Liberal Democrats | Michael T. A. Bishopp | 223 | 8.3 | −4.1 |
| Green | Bernice C. Golberg | 82 | 3.0 | +3.0 |
| The People’s Choice | Holly M. Edmonds | 34 | 1.3 | +1.3 |
| Monster Raving Loony | John S. Cartwright | 31 | 1.1 | −4.2 |
| Majority | | 588 | 21.7 | |
| Turnout | | 2,700 | 28.1 | |
| Conservative hold | | Swing | | |

The by-election was called following the resignation of Cllr Audrey-Marie Yates.

=== 2006-2010 ===
Bensham Manor by-election, 8 February 2007
| Party | Candidate | Votes | % | ±% |
|---|---|---|---|---|
| Labour | Alison Butler | 1683 | 61.7 | |
| Conservative | Roger Taylor | 617 | 22.6 | |
| Green | Shasha Khan | 240 | 8.8 | |
| Liberal Democrats | Christina Tyree | 126 | 4.6 | |
| UKIP | James R Feisenberger | 40 | 1.5 | |
| Monster Raving Loony | John S. Cartwright | 15 | 0.5 | |
| The People's Choice | Mark Samuel | 9 | 0.3 | |
| Majority | | 1066 | 39 | |
| Turnout | | 2730 | 26.0 | |
| Labour hold | | Swing | | |

The by-election was called following the resignation of Cllr Paula Shaw.

Waddon by-election, 12 February 2009
| Party | Candidate | Votes | % | ±% |
|---|---|---|---|---|
| Conservative | Clare Hilley | 1,462 | 46.0 | +2.7 |
| Labour | Ian Payne | 1,222 | 38.5 | +0.7 |
| BNP | Charlotte Lewis | 157 | 4.9 | +4.9 |
| Liberal Democrats | Patricia Gauge | 150 | 4.7 | −2.7 |
| Green | Mary J. Davey | 115 | 3.6 | −5.4 |
| UKIP | Kathleen Garner | 48 | 1.5 | +1.5 |
| The People's Choice! Exclusively For All | Mark R. L. Samuel | 13 | 0.4 | +0.4 |
| Monster Raving Loony | John S. Cartwright | 11 | 0.3 | +0.3 |
| Majority | | 240 | 7.5 | |
| Turnout | | 3,178 | 28.6 | |
| Conservative hold | | Swing | | |

The by-election was called following the death of Cllr Jonathan Driver.

=== 2010-2014 ===
There were no by-elections.

=== 2014-2018 ===
Selhurst by-election, 5 March 2015
| Party | Candidate | Votes | % | ±% |
|---|---|---|---|---|
| Labour | David Wood | 1,517 | 71.5 | +19.5 |
| Conservative | Tirena Gunter | 246 | 11.6 | −2.0 |
| Green | Tracey Hague | 148 | 7.0 | −1.5 |
| UKIP | Annette Reid | 147 | 6.9 | −5.7 |
| Liberal Democrats | Geoff Morley | 65 | 3.1 | −2.9 |
| Majority | | 1,271 | 59.9 | |
| Turnout | | 2,123 | | |
| Labour hold | | Swing | | |

The by-election was triggered by the death of Councillor Gerry Ryan.

West Thornton by-election, 5 May 2016
| Party | Candidate | Votes | % | ±% |
|---|---|---|---|---|
| Labour | Callton Young | 3,136 | 64.7 | +2.0 |
| Conservative | Scott Roche | 989 | 20.4 | +3.0 |
| Green | David Beall | 289 | 6.0 | −2.5 |
| UKIP | Ace Nnorom | 145 | 3.0 | −5.0 |
| Liberal Democrats | Geoff Morley | 140 | 2.9 | −0.5 |
| Independence from Europe | Peter Morgan | 77 | 1.6 | N/A |
| English Democrat | Winston McKenzie | 70 | 1.4 | N/A |
| Majority | | 2,147 | 44.3 | |
| Turnout | | | 44 | |
| Labour hold | | Swing | | |

The by-election was triggered by the resignation of Councillor Emily Benn.

South Norwood by-election, 7 September 2017
| Party | Candidate | Votes | % | ±% |
|---|---|---|---|---|
| Labour | Patsy Cummings | 1,671 | 59.0 | +7.8 |
| Conservative | Becca Natrajan | 475 | 16.8 | −3.4 |
| Liberal Democrats | Claire Bonham | 388 | 13.7 | +6.7 |
| Green | Peter Underwood | 218 | 7.7 | −3.3 |
| UKIP | Michael Swadling | 78 | 2.8 | −7.9 |
| Majority | | 1,196 | 42.3 | |
| Turnout | | 2,830 | | |
| Labour hold | | Swing | | |

The by-election was triggered by the resignation of Councillor Kathy Bee.

=== 2018-2022 ===
Norbury & Pollards Hill by-election, 14 March 2019
| Party | Candidate | Votes | % | ±% |
|---|---|---|---|---|
| Labour | Leila Ben-Hassel | 1,379 | 64.5 | −3.3 |
| Conservative | Tirena Gunter | 324 | 15.2 | −6.9 |
| Independent | Mark O'Grady | 162 | 7.6 | +7.6 |
| Green | Rachel Chance | 91 | 4.3 | −6.0 |
| Independent | Malgorzata Roznerska | 72 | 3.4 | +3.4 |
| Liberal Democrats | Guy Burchett | 70 | 3.3 | +3.3 |
| UKIP | Kathleen Garner | 40 | 1.9 | +1.9 |
| Majority | | 1,055 | | |
| Turnout | | 2,145 | 25.3 | |
| Labour hold | | Swing | | |

The by-election was caused by the death of Councillor Maggie Mansell.

Fairfield by-election, 7 November 2019
| Party | Candidate | Votes | % | ±% |
|---|---|---|---|---|
| Labour | Caragh Skipper | 849 | 40.8 | −10.2 |
| Conservative | Jayde Edwards | 536 | 25.7 | −4.2 |
| Liberal Democrats | Andrew Rendle | 397 | 19.1 | +10.0 |
| Green | Esther Sutton | 237 | 11.4 | +1.3 |
| Women's Equality | Heather Twidle | 40 | 1.9 | +1.9 |
| Independent | Mark Samuel | 23 | 1.1 | +1.1 |
| Majority | | 313 | 15.0 | |
| Turnout | | 2,082 | | |
| Labour hold | | Swing | | |

The by-election was caused by the resignation of Councillor Niroshan Sirisena.

Kenley by-election, 6 May 2021
| Party | Candidate | Votes | % | ±% |
|---|---|---|---|---|
| Conservative | Ola Kolade | 2,220 | 59.7 | −5.7 |
| Labour | John Sailing | 618 | 16.6 | −3.2 |
| Liberal Democrats | Adrian Glendinning | 455 | 12.2 | +5.5 |
| Green | Esther Sutton | 372 | 10.0 | +1.9 |
| Heritage | Zachary Stiling | 52 | 1.4 | +1.4 |
| Majority | | 1,602 | 43.1 | |
| Turnout | | 3,717 | | |
| Conservative hold | | Swing | | |

The by-election was caused by the resignation of Councillor Steve O'Connell.

New Addington North by-election, 6 May 2021
| Party | Candidate | Votes | % | ±% |
|---|---|---|---|---|
| Labour | Kola Agboola | 1,214 | 48.6 | −11.4 |
| Conservative | Lara Fish | 985 | 39.5 | +19.5 |
| Independent | Michael Castle | 109 | 4.4 | +4.4 |
| Green | Tracey Hague | 98 | 3.8 | −2.2 |
| BNP | John Clarke | 55 | 2.2 | −4.9 |
| Liberal Democrats | Keith Miller | 38 | 1.5 | +1.5 |
| Majority | | 229 | 9.2 | |
| Turnout | | 2,496 | | |
| Labour hold | | Swing | | |

The by-election was caused by the resignation of Councillor Simon Hall.

Park Hill and Whitgift by-election, 6 May 2021
| Party | Candidate | Votes | % | ±% |
|---|---|---|---|---|
| Conservative | Jade Appleton | 1,188 | 52.5 | −3.4 |
| Labour | Chrishni Reshekaron | 724 | 32.0 | +0.9 |
| Green | Catherine Graham | 199 | 8.8 | +2.5 |
| Liberal Democrats | Richard Howard | 153 | 6.8 | +0.1 |
| Majority | | 464 | 20.5 | |
| Turnout | | 2,264 | | |
| Conservative hold | | Swing | | |

The by-election was caused by the resignation of Councillor Vidhi Mohan.

South Norwood by-election, 6 May 2021
| Party | Candidate | Votes | % | ±% |
|---|---|---|---|---|
| Labour | Louis Carserides | 2,276 | 49.9 | −17.2 |
| Conservative | Sonia Marinello | 1,173 | 25.7 | +8.9 |
| Green | Ria Patel | 423 | 9.3 | +0.6 |
| Liberal Democrats | Luke Bonham | 288 | 6.3 | −1.1 |
| Taking the Initiative | Angela Kaler | 251 | 5.5 | +5.5 |
| Independent | Jane Nicholl | 154 | 3.4 | +3.4 |
| Majority | | 1,103 | 24.2 | |
| Turnout | | 4,565 | | |
| Labour hold | | Swing | | |

The by-election was caused by the resignation of Councillor Jane Avis.

Woodside by-election, 6 May 2021
| Party | Candidate | Votes | % | ±% |
|---|---|---|---|---|
| Labour | Michael Bonello | 2,375 | 47.9 | −14.4 |
| Conservative | Michelle Kazi | 1,315 | 26.5 | +7.1 |
| Green | Peter Underwood | 515 | 10.4 | −0.4 |
| Liberal Democrats | Andrew Rendle | 368 | 7.4 | −0.2 |
| Taking the Initiative | Alison Johnson | 219 | 4.4 | +4.4 |
| Independent | Ian Bone | 125 | 2.5 | +2.5 |
| Independent | Mark Samuel | 40 | 0.8 | +0.8 |
| Majority | | 1,060 | 21.4 | |
| Turnout | | 4,957 | | |
| Labour hold | | Swing | | |

The by-election was caused by the resignation of Councillor Tony Newman.

=== 2022-2026 ===
South Croydon by-election, 30 June 2022
| Party | Candidate | Votes | % | ±% |
|---|---|---|---|---|
| Conservative | Danielle Denton | 1,306 | 42.9 | +2.9 |
| Labour | Ben Taylor | 821 | 27.0 | −2.1 |
| Liberal Democrats | John Jefkins | 448 | 14.7 | +0.6 |
| Green | Peter Underwood | 269 | 8.8 | −5.6 |
| Independent | Andrew Pelling | 158 | 5.2 | +5.2 |
| UKIP | Kathleen Garner | 25 | 0.8 | −1.7 |
| Independent | Mark Samuel | 18 | 0.6 | +0.6 |
| Majority | | 485 | 15.9 | |
| Turnout | | 3,045 | | |
| Conservative hold | | Swing | | |

The by-election was caused by the election of Councillor Jason Perry as Mayor of Croydon.

Selsdon Vale and Forestdale by-election, 3 November 2022
| Party | Candidate | Votes | % | ±% |
|---|---|---|---|---|
| Conservative | Fatima Zaman | 983 | 46.3 | −21.1 |
| Green | Peter Underwood | 530 | 24.9 | +8.8 |
| Labour | Tom Bowell | 372 | 17.5 | +1.0 |
| Independent | Andrew Pelling | 168 | 7.9 | +7.9 |
| Liberal Democrats | George Holland | 72 | 3.4 | +3.4 |
| Majority | | 453 | 21.3 | |
| Turnout | | 2,125 | | |
| Conservative hold | | Swing | | |

The by-election was caused by the death of Councillor Badsha Quadir.

Park Hill and Whitgift by-election, 2 May 2024
| Party | Candidate | Votes | % | ±% |
|---|---|---|---|---|
| Conservative | Andrew Price | 960 | 42.9 | −10.8 |
| Labour | Melanie Felten | 701 | 31.4 | +7.9 |
| Liberal Democrats | Andrew Pelling | 295 | 13.2 | +3.9 |
| Green | James Cork | 229 | 10.2 | −0.4 |
| Independent | Mark Samuel | 32 | 1.4 | +1.4 |
| TUSC | Benjamin Goldstone | 19 | 0.8 | +0.8 |
| Majority | | 259 | 11.6 | |
| Turnout | | 2,236 | | |
| Conservative hold | | Swing | | |

The by-election was caused by the resignation of Councillor Jade Appleton.

Woodside by-election, 2 May 2024
| Party | Candidate | Votes | % | ±% |
|---|---|---|---|---|
| Labour | Jessica Rich | 2,305 | 49.3 | −1.8 |
| Conservative | Deborah Titilope | 1,014 | 21.7 | +3.7 |
| Green | Nicholas Burman-Vince | 641 | 13.7 | +0.4 |
| Liberal Democrats | Jahir Hussain | 487 | 10.4 | −0.9 |
| Taking the Initiative | Shane Sobers | 150 | 3.2 | −3.1 |
| TUSC | Michelle Wall | 82 | 1.8 | +1.8 |
| Majority | | 1,291 | 27.6 | |
| Turnout | | 4,679 | | |
| Labour hold | | Swing | | |

The by-election was caused by the resignation of Councillor Mike Bonello.
