= Broad Green (ward) =

Coordinates: 51.380°N 0.114°W

- ward for Croydon Council
- Boundary of Broad Green in Croydon from 2018.
- County: Greater London

Current ward
- Created: 1965
- Councillor: Stuart Collins (Labour)
- Councillor: Sherwan Chowdhury (Labour)
- Councillor: Manju Shahul-Hameed (Labour)
- Number of councillors: Three
- UK Parliament constituency: Croydon West

Broad Green is a ward in the London Borough of Croydon, London in the United Kingdom, covering the West Croydon area. Broad Green locality is divided between this ward and Selhurst ward.

The ward extends from central Croydon to the south to the boundary with the London Boroughs of Sutton and Merton by Mitcham Common. It includes part of the retail core of Croydon and the northern part of the Purley Way retail area.

The ward returns three councillors every four years. At the 2011 Census the ward had a population of 18,652.

The ward currently forms part of Sarah Jones MP's Croydon North constituency.

The ward became smaller in 2018, following boundary changes in Croydon.

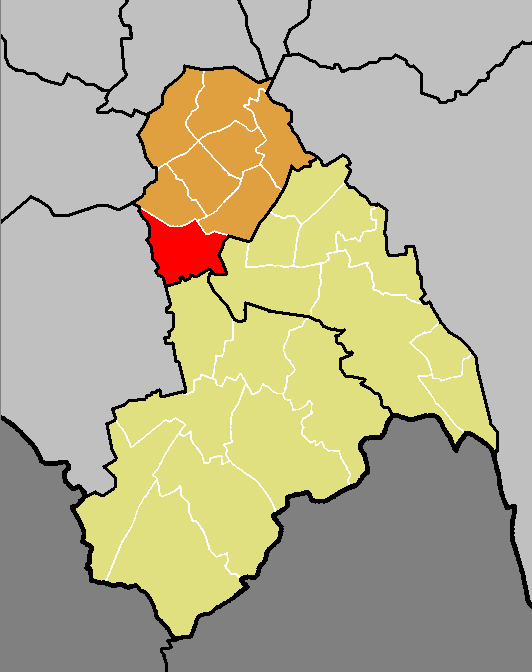
The former Bensham Manor ward (red) shown within Croydon North constituency (orange) and the London Borough of Croydon (yellow)

== List of Councillors ==
Election	Councillor	Party	Councillor	Party	Councillor	Party
1964	Ward created					
1964	Miss L. Overton	Labour	F. G. West	Labour	A. G. Wright	Labour
1968	L. D. Emerton	Conservative	R. H. Kent	Conservative	L. T. Wiles	Conservative
1971	P. J. Grieve Smith	Labour	P. Byrne	Labour	Mrs Ann M. Watson, J.P.	Labour
1974	Michael Warne	Labour	P. Byrne	Labour	Mrs Ann M. Watson, J.P.	Labour
1978	Michael Warne	Labour	James A. Keeling	Labour	Mrs Ann M. Watson, J.P.	Labour
1982	Gillian Charman	Conservative	Andrew J. Pelling	Conservative	Douglas A. H. Sharman	Conservative
1986	Christine M. Jarrold	Labour	Kevin D. Jarrold	Labour	Hugh P. Atkinson	Labour
1990	Rodney G. D. Matlock	Labour	Anthony J. Slatcher	Labour	Peter L. Spalding	Labour
1993 by-election	Rodney G. D. Matlock	Labour	Stuart Collins	Labour	Peter L. Spalding	Labour
2002	Timothy Godfrey	Labour	Stuart Collins	Labour	Mike Selva	Labour
2006	Manju Shahul-Hameed	Labour	Stuart Collins	Labour	Mike Selva	Labour
2018	Manju Shahul-Hameed	Labour	Stuart Collins	Labour	Muhammad Ali	Labour
2022	Manju Shahul-Hameed	Labour	Stuart Collins	Labour	Sherwan Chowdhury	Labour
2026	Manju Shahul-Hameed	Labour	Aba Amoah	Labour	Tom Bowell	Labour

== Mayoral election results ==
Below are the results for the candidate which received the highest share of the popular vote in the ward at each mayoral election.

Year	Mayoralty	Mayoral candidate	Party	Winner?
2004	Mayor of London	Ken Livingstone	Labour	✓
2008	Mayor of London	Ken Livingstone	Labour	✗
2012	Mayor of London	Ken Livingstone	Labour	✗
2016	Mayor of London	Sadiq Khan	Labour	✓
2021	Mayor of London	Sadiq Khan	Labour	✓
2022	Mayor of Croydon	Val Shawcross	Labour	✗
2026	Mayor of Croydon	Rowenna Davis	Labour	✗

== Ward results ==
=== 2018 - Present ===
Croydon Council Election 2026: Broad Green
Party	Candidate	Votes	%	±%
Labour Co-op	Aba Amoah	1,919	43.4	
Labour Co-op	Tom Bowell	1,742	39.4	
Labour Co-op	Manju Shahul-Hameed	1,584	35.9	−20.5
Green	Ian Bridgeman	1,029	23.3	
Green	Samuel John	938	21.2	
Green	Tariq Salim	860	19.5	
Reform	Christine Bigrigg	823	18.6	
Conservative	Mary Croos	685	15.5	
Conservative	Titilope Fadipe	581	13.2	
Conservative	Alfie Kingett	521	11.8	
Reform	Roger Flook	504	11.4	
Reform	Tiju Thomas	474	10.7	
Liberal Democrats	Adrian Waters	353	8.0	−5.9
TUSC	Khamisi Greene	83	1.9	
Turnout		4,418	32.11	+5.59
Labour Co-op hold		Swing		
Labour Co-op hold		Swing		
Labour Co-op hold		Swing		

Croydon Council Election 2022: Broad Green (3)
Party	Candidate	Votes	%	±%
Labour	Stuart Collins*	1,885	20.7	
Labour	Sherwan Chowdhury†	1,764	19.4	
Labour	Manju Shahul-Hameed*	1,707	18.8	
Conservative	Jane Parker	775	8.5	
Conservative	Peter Anike	769	8.5	
Conservative	James Rajadurai	721	7.9	
Liberal Democrats	Adrian George Waters	420	4.6	
Green	Winston Phillips	389	4.3	
Green	DJ Singh	331	3.6	
Green	Irene Theochari	325	3.6	
Turnout		3,534	26.52	
Labour hold		Swing		
Labour hold		Swing		
Labour hold		Swing		

Croydon Council Election 2018: Broad Green (3)
Party	Candidate	Votes	%	±%
Labour	Stuart Collins	3,105	74.8	
Labour	Muhammad Ali	2,820	68.0	
Labour	Manju Shahul-Hameed	2,678	64.5	
Conservative	Jayde Edwards	698	16.8	
Conservative	Kofi Frimpong	693	16.7	
Conservative	Sharmmi Jeganmogan	661	15.9	
Green	Tim Watson	414	10.0	
Green	Am Weatherspoon	299	7.2	
Majority		1,980	17.42	
Turnout				
Labour hold		Swing		
Labour hold		Swing		
Labour hold		Swing		

=== 2002 to 2014 ===
Croydon Council Election 2014: Broad Green (3)
Party	Candidate	Votes	%	±%
Labour	Stuart Collins	2,754		
Labour	Mike Selva	2,609		
Labour	Manju Shahul-Hameed	2,289		
Conservative	Fabion Emmanuel	761		
Conservative	Andrew Stevensen	579		
Conservative	Sophia Khan	535		
UKIP	Peter Kirby	500		
UKIP	Herman Lyken	404		
Green	Nicholas Barnett	395		
Green	Bimal Mohanan	301		
Green	Pravina Ellis	265		
Liberal Democrats	Syed Mohiuddin	170		
TUSC	Paul McMillan	69		
Communist	Peter Latham	69		
TUSC	Ragesh Khakhira	65		
Majority				
Turnout				
Labour hold		Swing		
Labour hold		Swing		
Labour hold		Swing		

Croydon Council Election 2006: Broad Green (3)
Party	Candidate	Votes	%	±%
Labour	Stuart Collins	1,777		
Labour	Mike Selva	1,600		
Labour	Manju Shahul-Hameed	1,576		
Conservative	Ian Parker	1,076		
Conservative	Patrick Ratnaraja	1,073		
Conservative	Jill Thomas	975		
Liberal Democrats	Syed Mohiuddin	513		
Communist	Peter Latham	177		
Turnout		3,426	31.5%	
Registered electors		10,885		
Labour hold		Swing		
Labour hold		Swing		
Labour hold		Swing		

Croydon Council Election 2002: Broad Green (3)
Party	Candidate	Votes	%	±%
Labour	Stuart Collins	1,737		
Labour	Timothy Godfrey	1,634		
Labour	Michael S.P. Selvanayagam	1,594		
Conservative	Ian J. Parker	591		
Conservative	Keith B. Pearson	514		
Conservative	Jill Thomas	492		
UKIP	Christopher N. Pearce	264		
Majority				
Turnout				
Labour hold		Swing		
Labour hold		Swing		
Labour hold		Swing		

=== 1978 to 1998 ===
Croydon Council Election 1998: Broad Green (3)
Party	Candidate	Votes	%	±%
Labour	Rodney G. Matlock	1,395		
Labour	Stuart Collins	1,331		
Labour	Peter L. Spalding	1,253		
Conservative	Ian J. Parker	612		
Conservative	Jill Thomas	553		
Conservative	Keith B. Pearson	532		
Majority				
Turnout				
Registered electors				
Labour hold		Swing		
Labour hold		Swing		
Labour hold		Swing		

Croydon Council Election 1994: Broad Green (3)
Party	Candidate	Votes	%	±%
Labour	Stuart Collins	2,230		
Labour	Rodney G. D. Matlock	2,171		
Labour	Peter L. Spalding	2,008		
Conservative	Eric S. Headlam	832		
Conservative	Keith B. Pearson	718		
Conservative	Donald S. Speakman	693		
Majority		1,176		
Turnout				
Registered electors				
Labour hold		Swing		
Labour hold		Swing		
Labour hold		Swing		

Broad Green by-election, 29 April 1993
Party	Candidate	Votes	%	±%
Labour	Stuart Collins	1,972	74.6	
Conservative	Patricia F. L. Knight	528	20.0	
Liberal Democrats	David A. Holmes	143	5.4	
Majority		1,244	54.5	
Turnout		2,643	30.2	
Labour hold		Swing		

The by-election was called following the resignation of Cllr. Anthony J. Slatcher.

Croydon Council Election 1990: Broad Green (3)
Party	Candidate	Votes	%	±%
Labour Co-op	Rodney G. D. Matlock	2,019		
Labour Co-op	Anthony J. Slatcher	1,926		
Labour Co-op	Peter L. Spalding	1,896		
Conservative	Kelly Ellender	1,004		
Conservative	Mohammed I. Khokhar	804		
Conservative	Yvonne E. Singh	785		
Majority		892		
Turnout				
Registered electors				
Labour Co-op hold		Swing		
Labour Co-op hold		Swing		
Labour Co-op hold		Swing		

Croydon Council Election 1986: Broad Green (3)
Party	Candidate	Votes	%	±%
Labour	Christine M. Jarrold	1,913		
Labour	Kevin D. Jarrold	1,895		
Labour	Hugh P. Atkinson	1,887		
Conservative	Geoffrey N. de Bois	870		
Conservative	Douglas A. H. Sharman	801		
Conservative	Stephen G. Ghero	792		
Alliance	Christopher M. Pocock	524		
Alliance	Christopher D. Hunt	513		
Alliance	Stephen A. Hall	500		
Majority		1,017		
Turnout				
Registered electors				
Labour gain from Conservative		Swing		
Labour gain from Conservative		Swing		
Labour gain from Conservative		Swing		

Croydon Council Election 1982: Broad Green (3)
Party	Candidate	Votes	%	±%
Conservative	Gillian Charman	1,216		
Conservative	Andrew J. Pelling	1,173		
Conservative	Douglas A.H. Sharman	1,151		
Labour	James A. Keeling	1,138		
Labour	Victor Martin	1,067		
Labour	Ann M. Watson	1,057		
Alliance	Moira C. Bamfield	846		
Liberal	Charles E. Burling	831		
Alliance	David E. Beeke	823		
Communist	Peter A.G. Latham	78		
Turnout				
Conservative gain from Labour		Swing		
Conservative gain from Labour		Swing		
Conservative gain from Labour		Swing		

Croydon Council Election 1978: Broad Green (3)
Party	Candidate	Votes	%	±%
Labour	James A. Keeling	1,708		
Labour	Ann Watson, J.P.	1,700		
Labour	Michael Warne	1,694		
Conservative	Christopher N. P. Lewis	1,316		
Conservative	Rosemary P. Tomlin	1,304		
Conservative	Joseph P. Szadlo	1,177		
Liberal	Joan H. Leck	305		
Liberal	Roger W. Stephens	279		
Liberal	Gwendoline M. Luxford	274		
Majority		378		
Turnout			37.9	▲3.1%
Registered electors		9,624		
Labour hold		Swing		
Labour hold		Swing		
Labour hold		Swing		

=== 1964 to 1974 ===
Croydon Council Election 1974: Broad Green (3)
Party	Candidate	Votes	%	±%
Labour	Mrs A. M. Watson	1,996		
Labour	P. Byrne	1,939		
Labour	M. Warne	1,913		
Conservative	L. T. Wiles	993		
Conservative	P. R. Woolford	951		
Conservative	J. P. Szadlo	873		
Liberal	R. W. Stephens	465		
Majority		920		
Turnout			34.8	▼4.3%
Registered electors		9,749		
Labour hold		Swing		
Labour hold		Swing		
Labour hold		Swing		

Croydon Council Election 1971: Broad Green (3)
Party	Candidate	Votes	%	±%
Labour	P. J. Grieve Smith	2,503		
Labour Co-op	P. Byrne	2,462		
Labour Co-op	Mrs A. M. Watson	2,395		
Conservative	R. H. Kent	1,149		
Conservative	L. H. Rosan	1,095		
Conservative	L. T. Wiles	1,071		
Turnout			39.1	▲10.4%
Registered electors		9,703		
Labour gain from Conservative		Swing		
Labour Co-op gain from Conservative		Swing		
Labour Co-op gain from Conservative		Swing		

Croydon Council Election 1968: Broad Green (3)
Party	Candidate	Votes	%	±%
Conservative	L.D. Emerton	1,592		
Conservative	R.H. Kent	1,538		
Conservative	L.T. Wiles	1,530		
Labour	P. Byrne	1,042		
Labour	Mrs W.M. Holt	1,041		
Labour	F.G. West	1,025		
Communist	Mrs A. Waddell	175		
Turnout			28.7	▼0.6%
Registered electors		9,970		
Conservative gain from Labour		Swing		
Conservative gain from Labour		Swing		
Conservative gain from Labour		Swing		

Croydon Council Election 1964: Broad Green (3)
Party	Candidate	Votes	%	±%
Labour	Miss L. Overton	2,151		
Labour	F. G. West	2,084		
Labour	A. G. Wright	2,064		
Conservative	J. M. Stamford	924		
Conservative	Miss M. Baker-Rogers	890		
Conservative	D. M. Stranack	868		
Communist	C. Young	153		
Turnout		3,188	29.3	
Registered electors		10,866		
Labour win (new seat)				
Labour win (new seat)				
Labour win (new seat)				
