= Broad Green =

Broad Green could refer to:

- Broad Green, Cambridgeshire
- Broad Green, Essex
- Broad Green, Herefordshire
- Broad Green, London
  - Broad Green (ward)
- Broad Green, Merseyside
- Broad Green, Mid Suffolk
- Broad Green, St Edmundsbury
