= Bryn Davies, Baron Davies of Brixton =

British trade unionist and politician (born 1944)

The Right Honourable The Lord Davies of Brixton
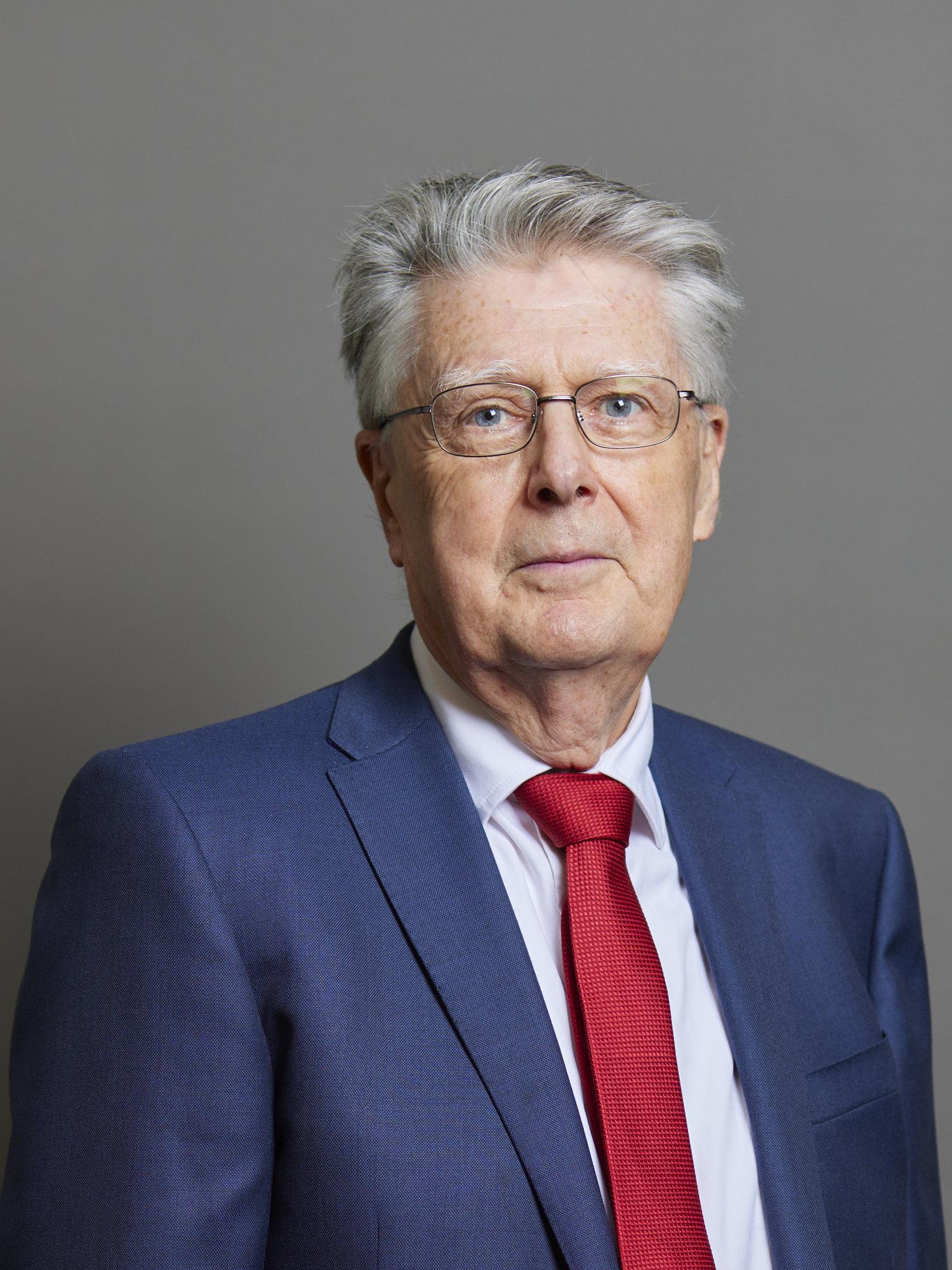
- Official portrait, 2021

Member of the House of Lords
- Lord Temporal
- Life peerage 18 September 2020

Personal details
- Born: Brinley Howard Davies; 17 May 1944 (age 82)
- Party: Labour
- Education: University of Hull
- Profession: Trade unionist; actuary

Brinley Howard Davies, Baron Davies of Brixton (born 17 May 1944), known as Bryn Davies, is a British trade unionist, actuary and politician who was Leader of the Inner London Education Authority in the early 1980s.

== Early life ==
Davies graduated from the University of Hull and qualified as an actuary. He worked in the pensions industry, becoming a Fellow of the Institute of Actuaries in 1974. He worked for the Trades Union Congress as Pensions Officer from that year, advising member unions on occupational and state pensions. With this came membership of the Occupation Pensions Board.

== Local government ==
In 1971, Davies was elected as a Labour councillor in Waddon in the London Borough of Croydon, but lost his seat to the Conservative candidate in the 1974 elections. He was then elected to Lambeth London Borough Council in the 1978 election, where he became Deputy Leader.

At the beginning of 1980, the opportunity arose for him to go into London-wide politics in a by-election for the Greater London Council at Vauxhall, which he won easily as a Labour candidate. With membership of the GLC came ex officio membership of the Inner London Education Authority. Davies aligned himself with the left under Ken Livingstone.

The 1981 elections brought a new left majority to London. On 9 May 1981 Davies was chosen to be the new Leader of ILEA at the Annual General Meeting of the ILEA Labour Group, ousting Sir Ashley Bramall by 21 votes to 15. Bramall, who had been Leader for the previous eleven years, would have preferred to stay. Frances Morrell became Deputy Leader, replacing Mair Garside. The Labour right thought this takeover had been brutal and several of them decided to make life difficult for the new administration.

Among the first decisions taken under Davies' control was to allow GLC teachers paid leave to attend the People's March for Jobs, a protest against unemployment, but a rebellion by more moderate Labour councillors defeated the plan. ILEA continued the comprehensivisation policy and intensified it by ending 'streaming' within schools and insisting that Church schools end all selection as well. Davies' early priorities included a reduction in the price of school meals, which he eventually pressed through in spite of defeats caused by Labour rebellions and efforts to have it declared illegal.

ILEA's budget increased by 14% in the first year (and its precept by 46%) while the Conservatives nationally criticised the cost of schooling under ILEA which was the highest in the country. Margaret Thatcher had taken against ILEA when Education Secretary in the Heath government. However Davies never had to deal with the abolition of ILEA, as his deputy Frances Morrell used her connections within the GLC Women's Group to depose him in April 1983. He remained as a backbencher long enough to prove his left-wing credentials by supporting the strategy, subsequently held to be illegal, of refusing to set a GLC rate as a protest at ratecapping.

== Professional career ==
Davies went back into pensions in 1985 as a Director of Pensions and Investment Research Consultants. Later that year he was appointed as a Research Actuary at Bacon and Woodrow, and resigned from the GLC and ILEA. In 1989 he set up Union Pension Services, a consultancy on occupation pensions specialising in those for trade unions. He continues to work in and write about pensions.

== Honours ==
Davies was made a Baron in the Dissolution Peerages 2019 by the Leader of the Labour Party at the time, Jeremy Corbyn. He made his maiden speech on 25 November 2020.

Preceded by Ashley Bramall	Leader of the Inner London Education Authority; 1981-1983	Succeeded by Frances Morrell
Orders of precedence in the United Kingdom
Preceded by Lord Spencer of Alresford	Gentlemen; Baron Davies of Brixton	Followed by Lord Dodds of Duncairn
