= Gee Bernard =

British politician

Gwendolyn Enid "Gee" Bernard (29 December 1934 – 6 December 2016) was the first Black councillor for Croydon in London for the Labour Party. She served from 1986 to 2002.

== Early life and education ==
Bernard was born in 1934 in Jamaica and grew up on a farm. She later moved to England as a teenager and studied at the University of North London and East London College, qualifying as a social worker.

== Career ==
In 1980, she worked in the education department of Tower Hamlets Council and was elected a member of the Inner London Education Authority (ILEA) in 1981.

In 1986, she was elected to the Croydon Borough Council for the ward of West Thornton, becoming its first black city councillor. She represented the ward until 2002.

In 1993, she founded the Croydon African and Caribbean Family Organisation (C.A.C.F.O), which, amongst other things, provided education for children excluded from school. In 1997, she organised parents in Croydon to crowdsource a register of children formally and informally excluded from school.

== Death ==
Bernard died on 6 December 2016. She was 82.

== See also ==
- Jay Bernard (writer), grandchild of Gee Bernard
