= Sasha Johnson =

British activist

- Born: c. 1993–1994 (age 31–33)
- Education: Ruskin College
- Occupation: Political activist
- Political party: Taking the Initiative Party
- Movement: Black Lives Matter

Sasha Johnson (born c. 1993–1994) is a British woman who has been an activist and member of Taking the Initiative Party (TTIP). A student of Ruskin College, she was involved in the Rhodes Must Fall protest, and with Black Lives Matter and Kill the Bill protests.

On 23 May 2021, Johnson was shot in the head at a party in the early hours. Two days later, five men were arrested on suspicion of attempted murder, one of whom was later charged with conspiracy to murder while the others were released on bail. A second man was charged on 12 June and two further men were charged on 17 June with conspiracy to murder. The four men were scheduled to stand trial in March 2022 but the trial was abandoned in February 2022; the defendants were formally found not guilty when the prosecution offered no evidence.

== Background ==
Johnson's mother is Ellet Dalling and she has a sister. Johnson studied in community development and youth work from Ruskin College. Prior to the shooting, Johnson ran a restaurant and volunteered for food insecurity initiatives. She worked in community activism and support, and was previously a youth worker. Johnson has two sons.

== Activism ==
Johnson campaigned for the Oxford Rhodes Must Fall campaign. She participated in the Black Lives Matter protests of 2020. In response to a counter-protest which included a right-wing presence with the stated intention of protecting war memorials, Johnson told The Guardian: "We're painted as thugs when the real thugs are disguised as protecting those memorials. And when they're drunk, they piss on those memorials." In August 2020, Johnson was an organiser for the Million People March, an anti-racist demonstration in London attended by around 400 people. In March 2021, Johnson was co-signatory to a statement alleging that police were targeting some black protesters who participated in the 2020 Black Lives Matter protests by name, including by repeated phone calls, to deter them from engaging in Kill the Bill protests.

In summer 2020, Johnson was involved in the founding of the Taking The Initiative Party (TTIP); she has served on its Executive Leadership Committee. Sky News reported that the party was registered with the Electoral Commission around 2017. The party supports the decentralised Black Lives Matter movement but is unaffiliated with the specific organisation Black Lives Matter. Though the party considered running for the 2021 London mayoral election (originally scheduled for 2020) under the name "Black Lives Matter for the GLA", its first candidates for office stood in the May 2021 local elections. In 2020 and 2021, false information circulated on social media that Johnson commented "the white man will not be our equal but our slave" on Twitter. The account in question was impersonating Johnson and suspended by Twitter.

== Shooting ==
On 23 May 2021, Johnson was shot in the head. The Metropolitan Police were notified of the attack, which took place in Peckham, London, at around 3 a.m. TTIP said Johnson had earlier received death threats and her car had been vandalised a month before the incident. At the time of the shooting she was facing prosecution for racial abuse of a police officer. According to a friend, Johnson was not the intended target of the shooting. A police spokesperson said a few hours after the crime that investigation was at an early stage, and that police had no knowledge of prior threats and that no-one had yet been arrested over the incident. On 25 May, police were reported as saying that Johnson "had been shot by a group of four black men" while attending a party; Metropolitan Police Commander Alison Heydari said the men had "entered the garden of the property and discharged a firearm". It was later reported that another person attending the party was shot in the foot. A vigil was held for Johnson outside King's College Hospital on the evening of 24 May, arranged by a UK offshoot of the US organisation Black Lives Matter.

On 26 May, five males between the ages of 17 and 28 were arrested on suspicion of the attempted murder of Johnson. An 18-year-old man was charged with conspiracy to murder; the four other males were bailed. On 7 June, the police and Johnson's mother appealed for witnesses, as none of the thirty party guests had come forward. On 12 June, a second man was charged with conspiracy to murder. On 16 June 2021, it was announced that a 25-year-old man had been arrested in Kent on that day on suspicion of conspiracy to murder. On 17 June, two further men were charged with conspiracy to murder. After a plea hearing on 5 November, they were due to stand trial for six weeks, beginning on 7 March 2022. By 7 June 2021, Johnson was still in hospital and under sedation in a critical condition, with "profound life-changing injuries" according to a police statement. The BBC reported on 16 June 2021 that since the shooting two surgical operations had been carried out to release pressure on Johnson's brain but that she remained critically ill.

The prosecution case was dropped on 22 February 2022, and the defendants were formally found "not guilty". Announcing that the case was being dropped, the prosecutor Mark Heywood QC said, "For very good reasons it is not possible to set out in full in open court the reasons it is so but it should be understood the relevant considerations have been given the most anxious and careful scrutiny", adding that the case against the defendants had been based on "circumstantial evidence" which included their phone data, movements, and interactions and that there was no direct evidence that identified them. Johnson had been in a relationship with an occupant of the house where the shooting had taken place and there had been a "falling out" and "hostility" between two of the accused and the two youngest occupants of the house. Following discontinuance of the prosecution, police and Johnson's family commented on the lack of cooperation with police by witnesses to the shooting.

By February 2022, Johnson remained in a serious but stable condition in hospital, having "suffered 'catastrophic' and permanent injuries". In May 2022, Crimestoppers announced a £20,000 reward for anyone providing information leading to the conviction of those responsible for the shooting. In May 2025, after a Channel 4 documentary aired about Who Shot Sasha Johnson, two songs were written and produced by Notation Festival to help bring awareness and encourage people to speak out and reveal the truth behind the shooting.

=== Responses ===
Labour Party MP Diane Abbott suggested that the shooting was a racially motivated attack and was targeted because of Johnson's activism; this drew criticism from a Home Office spokesperson, on the grounds that it would tend to stoke racial tension. TTIP criticised the police statement that nothing indicated the attack was targeted, asking how police were able to say that Johnson had not received credible threats without speaking to her, and said there was "no evidence" the shooting was carried out by four black males, as "[the TTIP] have multiple sources present at the incident who have confirmed to us that the attackers were all wearing balaclavas". TTIP said they were "disgusted by the way that this narrative has been portrayed as a 'Black on Black crime' and a 'gang crime,' not acknowledging that this is a hate crime or a targeted attack at worst."
