= 1968 Croydon London Borough Council election =

1968 local election in England

Croydon Council Election, 1968
← 1964	9 May 1968	1971 →

All 60 councillors in 20 wards, and 10 Aldermen in the London Borough of Croydon 36 seats needed for a majority
	First party	Second party	Third party
Leader	Unknown	Unknown	N/A
Party	Conservative	Labour	Independent
Seats before	26	24	20
Seats won	54	3	12
Seat change	▲28	▼21	▼8
	Fourth party
Leader	Unknown
Party	Liberal
Seats before	0
Seats won	1
Seat change	▲1
Leader of the Council before election
Unknown
Conservative
Elected Leader
Unknown
Conservative

The 1968 Croydon Council election took place on 9 May 1968 to elect members of Croydon London Borough Council in London, England. The whole council was up for election and the Conservative Party gained overall control of the council. Turnout in this election was 36.2%.

== Election result ==
Croydon Council election result 1968 - Councillors
Party	Seats	Gains	Losses	Net gain/loss	Seats %	Votes %	Votes	+/−
Conservative	47			▲26	78.33	58.9		
Labour	1			▼20	1.67	16.9		
Independent	11			▼7	18.33			
Liberal	1	1		▲1	1.67	11.9		

Croydon Council election result 1968 - Aldermen (1968-74)
Party	Seats	Gains	Losses	Net gain/loss	Seats %	Votes %	Votes	+/−
Conservative	4	2	▲2		80.0			
Labour	0		1	▼1	0.0			
Independent	1		1	▼1	20.0			
Liberal	0				0.0			

Croydon Council election result 1964 - Aldermen (1964-71)
Party	Seats	Gains	Losses	Net gain/loss	Seats %	Votes %	Votes	+/−
Conservative	3				60.0			
Labour	2				40.0			
Independent	0				0.0			
Liberal	0				0.0			

Croydon Council election result 1968 - Total result
Party	Seats	Gains	Losses	Net gain/loss	Seats %	Votes %	Votes	+/−
Conservative	54			▲28	77.14	58.9		
Labour	3			▼21	4.29	16.9		
Independent	12			▼8	17.14			
Liberal	1	1		▲1	1.43	11.9		

↓
54	12	1	3
Conservative	Independent	Liberal	Labour

== Ward results ==
=== Addiscombe ===
Addiscombe (3)
Party	Candidate	Votes	%	±%
Conservative	A.W. Elliot	2,380		
Conservative	A.R. Hills	2,261		
Conservative	Mrs D.C.H Hobbs	2,241		
Labour	A.D Goddard	1005		
Labour	S. Boden	993		
Labour	L.W Wood	938		
Liberal	P. Miles	710		
Liberal	Miss P.H. Tapsell	684		
Liberal	V. Martin	653		
Turnout			38.4	▼4.4
Registered electors		10,863		
Conservative gain from Labour		Swing		
Conservative gain from Labour		Swing		
Conservative gain from Labour		Swing		

=== Bensham Manor ===
Bensham Manor (3)
Party	Candidate	Votes	%	±%
Residents	F.C. Emmerson	2,014		
Residents	H.A. Steward	1,967		
Residents	R.J. Bowker	1,932		
Liberal	Mrs J.C. Banks	854		
Liberal	Mrs J. Batchelor	839		
Liberal	D.J. Mateer	827		
Labour	G.P. Belcher	622		
Labour	Mrs K. Bexley	551		
Labour	A.R. Torpy	515		
Turnout			32.6	▼3.3
Registered electors		10,964		
Residents hold		Swing		
Residents hold		Swing		
Residents hold		Swing		

=== Broad Green ===
Broad Green (3)
Party	Candidate	Votes	%	±%
Conservative	L.D. Emerton	1,592		
Conservative	R.H. Kent	1,538		
Conservative	L.T. Wiles	1,530		
Labour	P. Byrne	1,042		
Labour	Mrs W.M. Holt	1,041		
Labour	F.G. West	1,025		
Communist	Mrs A. Waddell	175		
Turnout			28.7	▼0.6
Registered electors		9,970		
Conservative gain from Labour		Swing		
Conservative gain from Labour		Swing		
Conservative gain from Labour		Swing		

=== Central ===
Central (3)
Party	Candidate	Votes	%	±%
Conservative	R.W. Coatman	3,094		
Conservative	V.W.H. Bendall	3,088		
Conservative	J.H. Haywood	3,034		
Labour	F.D.J. Bailey	530		
Labour	E.L. Hall	501		
Labour	A.F. Packham	474		
Turnout			35.5	▼1.8
Registered electors		10,438		
Conservative hold		Swing		
Conservative hold		Swing		
Conservative hold		Swing		

=== Coulsdon East ===
Coulsdon East (3)
Party	Candidate	Votes	%	±%
Independent	A. Bonsier	1,697		
Liberal	H.C.E. Lovejoy	1,670		
Independent	Miss J.C. Simpson	1,624		
Independent	L. Blair	1,611		
Liberal	T.J. Austin	1,607		
Liberal	L.B. Groves	1,581		
Labour	A.L. Symes	283		
Labour	K. Corbett	282		
Labour	F.D. Grenfell	271		
Independent	S.B. Stray	97		
Turnout			34.2	▼0.2
Registered electors		10,816		
Independent gain from Residents		Swing		
Liberal gain from Residents		Swing		
Independent gain from Residents		Swing		

=== East ===
East (3)
Party	Candidate	Votes	%	±%
Independent	W.H. Simpson	3,301		
Independent	D.J. Sutton	3,264		
Independent	H.G. Whitwell	3,190		
Liberal	P.J. Lee	574		
Liberal	I.R. McNay	555		
Liberal	Mrs C. Mickelburgh	515		
Labour	Mrs A.M. Tuck	354		
Labour	Mrs K. Byrne	320		
Turnout			37.5	▼0.6
Registered electors		11,281		
Independent hold		Swing		
Independent hold		Swing		
Independent hold		Swing		

=== New Addington ===
New Addington (3)
Party	Candidate	Votes	%	±%
Conservative	M.H. Piper	1,275		
Labour	A.G. Edwards	1,262		
Conservative	Miss S. Copland	1,237		
Labour	T.J. Laffin	1,228		
Conservative	R.E. Gayler	1,215		
Labour	Mrs V.L. Rooke	1,183		
Turnout			20.8	▼9.8
Registered electors		12,932		
Conservative gain from Labour		Swing		
Labour hold		Swing		
Conservative gain from Labour		Swing		

=== Norbury ===
Norbury (3)
Party	Candidate	Votes	%	±%
Conservative Resident	W.E.R. Gower	2,881		
Conservative Resident	R.G. Willis	2,876		
Conservative Resident	G. Levy	2,837		
Liberal	T.P. Harwood	548		
Liberal	J.W. Keen	525		
Liberal	H.A. Rivers	521		
Labour	Mrs A.H. Sharp	456		
Labour	A. Pearce	436		
Labour	Mrs M.J. Boden	429		
Turnout			35.2	▼2.9
Registered electors		11,354		
Conservative Resident gain from Conservative		Swing		
Conservative Resident gain from Conservative		Swing		
Conservative Resident gain from Conservative		Swing		

=== Purley ===
Purley (3)
Party	Candidate	Votes	%	±%
Conservative	D.W. Pudney	3,350		
Conservative	R.W. Kersey	3,292		
Conservative	B.C. Sparrowe	3,281		
Liberal	K.H. Legge	538		
Liberal	Mrs W.D. Woodhouse	495		
Liberal	S.N. Rolph	462		
Labour	Mrs H.J. Keeling	213		
Labour	Mrs L.E. Mackenzie	188		
Labour	W.A. Adams	186		
Turnout			35.6	▲0.6
Registered electors		11,566		
Conservative hold		Swing		
Conservative hold		Swing		
Conservative hold		Swing		

=== Sanderstead & Selsdon ===
Sanderstead & Selsdon (3)
Party	Candidate	Votes	%	±%
Conservative	Mrs E.E. Bray	4,288		
Conservative	Mrs M.A.G. Davidson	4,225		
Conservative	B.H. Rawling	4,152		
Liberal	Mrs R.M. Mayhew	1,157		
Liberal	Mrs E.G. Paterson	1,150		
Liberal	R.I. Walters	1,051		
Labour	M.A. Harding	439		
Labour	J.E.V. Lewis	331		
Labour	T.G. Wymer	272		
Turnout			51.4	▼5.6
Registered electors		11,296		
Conservative hold		Swing		
Conservative hold		Swing		
Conservative hold		Swing		

=== Sanderstead North ===
Sanderstead North (3)
Party	Candidate	Votes	%	±%
Conservative	W.N. Peet	4,293		
Conservative	P.W. Rickards	4,268		
Conservative	K.A. Wells	4,190		
Liberal	R.A. Coleman	912		
Liberal	J.A.H. Clement	905		
Liberal	Mrs M.J. Woods	851		
Labour	Mrs P.M. Poole	483		
Labour	M.T. Reardon	426		
Labour	H. Stevens	409		
Turnout			47.4	▲5.6
Registered electors		12,004		
Conservative hold		Swing		
Conservative hold		Swing		
Conservative hold		Swing		

=== Shirley ===
Shirley (3)
Party	Candidate	Votes	%	±%
Conservative	R.W. Gilbert	4,672		
Conservative	P.S. Bowness	4,655		
Conservative	R.C. Nash	4,609		
Liberal	C.R. Chance	1,023		
Liberal	A.F. Reeves	941		
Liberal	M.A. Green	875		
Labour	H.W. Robertson	528		
Labour	K.J. Kinnard	480		
Labour	W.H. Ulyett	466		
Turnout			47.4	▲10.1
Registered electors		13,280		
Conservative hold		Swing		
Conservative hold		Swing		
Conservative hold		Swing		

=== South Norwood ===
South Norwood (3)
Party	Candidate	Votes	%	±%
Conservative	P.A. Saunders	2,800		
Conservative	Mrs B. Saunders	2,789		
Conservative	C.E. Kelly	2,684		
Labour	K.P. Whelan	667		
Labour	M. McGovern	649		
Labour	E.F. Neckles	611		
Liberal	M.E. Pache	296		
Liberal	Mrs I.J. Muir	293		
Liberal	Miss A.K. Harding	283		
Turnout			32.3	▼4.4
Registered electors		11,871		
Conservative gain from Conservative Resident		Swing		
Conservative gain from Conservative Resident		Swing		
Conservative gain from Conservative Resident		Swing		

=== Thornton Heath ===
Thornton Heath (3)
Party	Candidate	Votes	%	±%
Residents	J.G. Davies	2,371		
Residents	G.A. Barr	2,311		
Residents	F.S. Martin	2,304		
Labour	Mrs E. Sutcliffe	722		
Labour	S. Sutcliffe	716		
Labour	J.L. Walker	622		
Independent	M.E. Thomas	403		
Turnout			32.0	▼10.8
Registered electors		10,465		
Residents gain from Labour		Swing		
Residents gain from Labour		Swing		
Residents gain from Labour		Swing		

=== Upper Norwood ===
Upper Norwood (3)
Party	Candidate	Votes	%	±%
Conservative	Mrs M.C.V. Parfitt	3,609		
Conservative	A.E. Buddle	3,604		
Conservative	S.A. Draper	3,561		
Labour	T.E. Sharp	727		
Labour	T.C. Noyce	696		
Labour	Mrs J.M. Whelan	695		
Liberal	Leo C.E. Held	429		
Liberal	W.L. Day	397		
Liberal	J.S.M. Band	353		
Turnout			39.9	▲6.0
Registered electors		11,129		
Conservative hold		Swing		
Conservative hold		Swing		
Conservative hold		Swing		

=== Waddon ===
Waddon (3)
Party	Candidate	Votes	%	±%
Conservative	L.J. Young	2,921		
Conservative	D.S. Kingsland	2,892		
Conservative	R.J. Moseley	2,855		
Labour	J.T. Twitchett	1682		
Labour	V. Burgos	1655		
Labour	J.G. Stalley	1512		
National Front	J. Scott	273		
National Front	J.E. Bean	197		
Turnout			41.9	▼1.1
Registered electors		11,743		
Conservative gain from Labour		Swing		
Conservative gain from Labour		Swing		
Conservative gain from Labour		Swing		

=== West Thornton ===
West Thornton (3)
Party	Candidate	Votes	%	±%
Conservative Resident	R. Tilbury	2,533		
Conservative Resident	E.F.A. Whitehorn	2,491		
Conservative Resident	E.J. Fowler	2,487		
Labour	Miss L.L. Scott	769		
Labour	G.E. Mitchell	740		
Labour	G.A. Bristow	719		
Turnout			32.4	▼11.2
Registered electors		10,526		
Conservative Resident hold		Swing		
Conservative Resident hold		Swing		
Conservative Resident hold		Swing		

=== Whitehorse Manor ===
Whitehorse Manor (3)
Party	Candidate	Votes	%	±%
Conservative	J.P.A. Hobson	1,413		
Conservative	M.W. George	1,399		
Conservative	C. Johnston	1,391		
Labour	Mrs D.L. George	889		
Labour	D.B. Spillett	811		
Labour	Mrs A.G. Watson	766		
Turnout			22.5	▼10.7
Registered electors		10,478		
Conservative gain from Labour		Swing		
Conservative gain from Labour		Swing		
Conservative gain from Labour		Swing		

=== Woodcote & Coulsdon West ===
Woodcote & Coulsdon West (3)
Party	Candidate	Votes	%	±%
Conservative	Mrs N.B. Booth	3,493		
Conservative	S.E. Brassington	3,481		
Conservative	R.D. May	3,382		
Liberal	J.P. Callem	973		
Liberal	H.H. Giles	934		
Liberal	K. Norman	856		
Labour	Mrs I.M. Keefe	268		
Labour	Major H. Webb	254		
Labour	R.V. Miles	246		
Turnout			43.4	▲7.2
Registered electors		10,890		
Conservative hold		Swing		
Conservative hold		Swing		
Conservative hold		Swing		

=== Woodside ===
Woodside (3)
Party	Candidate	Votes	%	±%
Conservative	D. Winstone	2,082		
Conservative	Miss I.S. Rodda	2,039		
Conservative	J.C. Mann	2,014		
Labour	H.T.P. Mellor	1,040		
Labour	J.A. Keeling	1,038		
Labour	S.L. Eaton	919		
Communist	Mrs Q.E. Knight	241		
Turnout			31.2	▼4.3
Registered electors		10,661		
Conservative gain from Labour		Swing		
Conservative gain from Labour		Swing		
Conservative gain from Labour		Swing		
