= 1971 Croydon London Borough Council election =

1971 local election in England

Croydon Council Election, 1971
← 1968	13 May 1971	1974 →

All 60 councillors in 20 wards, and 10 Aldermen in the London Borough of Croydon 36 seats needed for a majority
	First party	Second party	Third party
Party	Conservative	Labour	Independent
Seats before	54	3	12
Seats won	38	29	3
Seat change	▼16	▲26	▼9
	Fourth party
Party	Liberal
Seats before	1
Seats won	0
Seat change	▼1
Leader of the Council before election
Unknown
Conservative
Elected Leader
Unknown
Conservative

The 1971 Croydon Council election took place on 13 May 1971 to elect members of Croydon London Borough Council in London, England. The whole council was up for election and the Conservative Party stayed in overall control of the council.

== Election result ==
Croydon Council election result 1971 - Councillors
Party	Seats	Gains	Losses	Net gain/loss	Seats %	Votes %	Votes	+/−
Conservative	30			▼17	50.0	47.4		
Labour	27			▲26	45.0	40.8		
Independent	3			▼8	5.0			
Liberal	0	0	1	▼1	0.0	6.1		

Croydon Council election result 1971 - Aldermen (1971-77)
Party	Seats	Gains	Losses	Net gain/loss	Seats %	Votes %	Votes	+/−
Conservative	3				60.0			
Labour	2				40.0			
Independent	0				0.0			
Liberal	0				0.0			

Croydon Council election result 1968 - Aldermen (1968-74)
Party	Seats	Gains	Losses	Net gain/loss	Seats %	Votes %	Votes	+/−
Conservative	5				100.0			
Labour	0				0.0			
Independent	0				0.0			
Liberal	0				0.0			

Note: One Alderman was elected as an independent in 1968, but was a Conservative by the time of this election.

Croydon Council election result 1971 - Total result
Party	Seats	Gains	Losses	Net gain/loss	Seats %	Votes %	Votes	+/−
Conservative	38			▼16	54.29	47.4		
Labour	29			▲26	41.43	40.8		
Independent	3			▼9	4.29			
Liberal	0	0	1	▼1	0.00	6.1		

↓
38	3	29
Con	Independent	Labour

== Ward results ==
=== Addiscombe ===
Addiscombe (3)
Party	Candidate	Votes	%	±%
Labour	L.E. Deane	2,665		
Labour	Mrs M. E. Curson	2,615		
Labour	Miss A. K. Usher	2,604		
Conservative	W. A. Elliot	2,130		
Conservative	Mrs D. C. H. Hobbs	2,025		
Conservative	J. C. Mann	2,011		
Turnout			42.6	▲4.2%
Registered electors		11,421		
Labour gain from Conservative		Swing		
Labour gain from Conservative		Swing		
Labour gain from Conservative		Swing		

=== Bensham Manor ===
Bensham Manor (3)
Party	Candidate	Votes	%	±%
Labour	G. P. Belcher	2,151		
Labour	Mrs S.E. Lord	2,037		
Labour	A. Devesar	2,027		
Conservative	R. J. Bowker	1,803		
Conservative	R. Hammond	1,671		
Conservative	G. Webster-Gardiner	1,602		
Liberal	William Henry Pitt	500		
Liberal	D. J. Mateer	498		
Liberal	J.S. Haydon	495		
Turnout			40.3	▲7.7%
Registered electors		11,121		
Labour gain from Residents		Swing		
Labour gain from Residents		Swing		
Labour gain from Residents		Swing		

=== Broad Green ===
Broad Green (3)
Party	Candidate	Votes	%	±%
Labour	P. J. Grieve Smith	2,503		
Labour Co-op	P. Byrne	2,462		
Labour Co-op	Mrs A. M. Watson	2,395		
Conservative	R. H. Kent	1,149		
Conservative	L. H. Rosan	1,095		
Conservative	L. T. Wiles	1,071		
Turnout			39.1	▲10.4%
Registered electors		9,703		
Labour gain from Conservative		Swing		
Labour Co-op gain from Conservative		Swing		
Labour Co-op gain from Conservative		Swing		

=== Central ===
Central (3)
Party	Candidate	Votes	%	±%
Conservative	R. W. Coatman	2,882		
Conservative	V. W. H. Bendall	2,865		
Conservative	J. H. Hayward	2,863		
Labour	Mrs B. C. Fisher	1,156		
Labour	F. D. J. Bailey	1,150		
Labour	E. L. Hall	1,126		
Turnout			35.8	▲0.3%
Registered electors		11,608		
Conservative hold		Swing		
Conservative hold		Swing		
Conservative hold		Swing		

=== Coulsdon East ===
Coulsdon East (3)
Party	Candidate	Votes	%	±%
Conservative	A. Bonsier	2,674		
Conservative	Mrs P. A. M. Little	2,541		
Conservative	A. B. Horton	2,378		
Liberal	H. C. E.Lovejoy	1,773		
Liberal	T. J. Austin	1,451		
Liberal	J. P. Callen	1,403		
Labour	Mrs P. A. Airey	552		
Labour	F. A. Davies	542		
Labour	Mrs I. M. Keefe	538		
Independent	S. B. Stray	94		
Turnout			44.5	▲10.3%
Registered electors		10,707		
Conservative gain from Independent		Swing		
Conservative gain from Liberal		Swing		
Conservative gain from Independent		Swing		

=== East ===
East (3)
Party	Candidate	Votes	%	±%
Independent	W. H. Simpson	2,895		
Independent	D. J. Sutton	2,856		
Independent	H. G. Whitwell	2,845		
Labour	J. W. King	1,408		
Labour	Mrs B. A. Wilson	1,407		
Labour	Mrs V. R. Davies	1,406		
Turnout			34.8	▼2.7%
Registered electors		12,667		
Independent hold		Swing		
Independent hold		Swing		
Independent hold		Swing		

=== New Addington ===
New Addington (3)
Party	Candidate	Votes	%	±%
Labour	R. J. Page	4,543		
Labour	T. J. Laffin	4,380		
Labour	P. J. Walker	4,321		
Conservative	M. H. Pieper	957		
Conservative	R. E. Gayler	812		
Conservative	Miss S. Copland	790		
A Tenant's Voice	R. G. Field	205		
Turnout			35.3	▲14.5%
Registered electors		16,194		
Labour gain from Conservative		Swing		
Labour hold		Swing		
Labour gain from Conservative		Swing		

=== Norbury ===
Norbury (3)
Party	Candidate	Votes	%	±%
Conservative	R. G. Willis	2,439		
Conservative	C. Johnston	2,436		
Conservative	K. M. B. Munro	2,401		
Labour	Mrs A. M. Tuck	1,472		
Labour	A. E. Fossey	1,444		
Labour	R. J. Irwin	1,444		
Turnout			33.7	▼1.5%
Registered electors		11,882		
Conservative gain from Conservative Resident		Swing		
Conservative gain from Conservative Resident		Swing		
Conservative gain from Conservative Resident		Swing		

=== Purley ===
Purley (3)
Party	Candidate	Votes	%	±%
Conservative	Mrs M. E. Campbell	2,744		
Conservative	Mrs J. M. C. Baker	2,700		
Conservative	G. A. Smith	2,694		
Labour	Mrs J. Y. Jones	822		
Labour	J. G. Stalley	807		
Labour	Mrs E. E. Daisley	797		
Liberal	N. McLeod	426		
Liberal	Mrs J. A. Callen	398		
Liberal	Miss L. Sparkes	351		
Turnout			31.7	▼3.9%
Registered electors		12,511		
Conservative hold		Swing		
Conservative hold		Swing		
Conservative hold		Swing		

=== Sanderstead & Selsdon ===
Sanderstead & Selsdon (3)
Party	Candidate	Votes	%	±%
Conservative	Mrs E. E. Bray	3,594		
Conservative	B. H. Rawling	3,559		
Conservative	S. E. Sexton	3,553		
Liberal	Miss M. S. Seagrave	809		
Liberal	Mrs J. P. Coleman	808		
Labour	W. A. Grimes	799		
Labour	W. P. Leighton	766		
Labour	Miss E. Stallibrass	766		
Liberal	J. M. Cowie	743		
Turnout			41.8	▼9.6%
Registered electors		12,451		
Conservative hold		Swing		
Conservative hold		Swing		
Conservative hold		Swing		

=== Sanderstead North ===
Sanderstead North (3)
Party	Candidate	Votes	%	±%
Conservative	P.W. Rickards	3,809		
Conservative	K.A. Wells	3,748		
Conservative	W.N. Peet	3,734		
Labour	Mrs P.M. Poole	1,113		
Labour	J.W. Gleisner	1,054		
Labour	G.C. Daisley	1,051		
Liberal	R.A. Coleman	433		
Liberal	J.A.H. Clement	404		
Liberal	Mrs M.J. Woods	403		
Turnout			41.1	▼6.3%
Registered electors		12,923		
Conservative hold		Swing		
Conservative hold		Swing		
Conservative hold		Swing		

=== Shirley ===
Shirley (3)
Party	Candidate	Votes	%	±%
Conservative	P. S. Bowness	4,148		
Conservative	F. R. Dubery	4,112		
Conservative	Mrs M. M. H. Horden	4,036		
Labour	J. E. Knight	1,473		
Labour	A. W. Jones	1,468		
Labour	Dr P. F. Knight	1,431		
Liberal	J. W. Hardy	557		
Liberal	R. E. Garrard	548		
Liberal	M. A. Green	518		
Turnout			39.7	▼7.7%
Registered electors		16,024		
Conservative hold		Swing		
Conservative hold		Swing		
Conservative hold		Swing		

=== South Norwood ===
South Norwood (3)
Party	Candidate	Votes	%	±%
Conservative	C. E. Kelly	2,159		
Conservative	Mrs B. Saunders	2,088		
Conservative	P. A. Saunders	2,050		
Labour	Mrs W. M. Holt	1,740		
Labour	A. D. Goddard	1,715		
Labour	K. J. Kinnard	1,708		
Turnout			30.9	▼1.4%
Registered electors		12,939		
Conservative hold		Swing		
Conservative hold		Swing		
Conservative hold		Swing		

=== Thornton Heath ===
Thornton Heath (3)
Party	Candidate	Votes	%	±%
Labour	G. E. Mitchell	2,100		
Labour	R. Rosser	2,001		
Labour	N. A. Tully	1,989		
Residents	J. G. Davies	1,889		
Residents	P. T. Chandler	1,883		
Residents	W. Blackwood	1,821		
Libertarian Socialist	I. McNay	130		
Turnout			37.5	▲5.5%
Registered electors		10,991		
Labour gain from Residents		Swing		
Labour gain from Residents		Swing		
Labour gain from Residents		Swing		

=== Upper Norwood ===
Upper Norwood (3)
Party	Candidate	Votes	%	±%
Conservative	A. E. Buddle	2,624		
Conservative	S. A. Draper	2,616		
Conservative	Mrs M. C. V. Parfitt	2,598		
Labour	Mrs B. E. Denvie	1,365		
Labour	R. G. Mills	1,226		
Labour	T. C. Noyce	1,222		
Liberal	Leo C. Held	405		
Liberal	A. J. McMillan	377		
Turnout			35.5	▼4.4%
Registered electors		12,210		
Conservative hold		Swing		
Conservative hold		Swing		
Conservative hold		Swing		

=== Waddon ===
Waddon (3)
Party	Candidate	Votes	%	±%
Labour	V. Burgos	3,449		
Labour	A. Brett	3,408		
Labour	B.H. Davies	3,367		
Conservative	D.S. Kingsland	2508		
Conservative	R.J. Moseley	2451		
Conservative	M.D. Wunn	2405		
Turnout			49.2	▲7.3%
Registered electors		12,451		
Labour gain from Conservative		Swing		
Labour gain from Conservative		Swing		
Labour gain from Conservative		Swing		

=== West Thornton ===
West Thornton (3)
Party	Candidate	Votes	%	±%
Labour	C. J. Mitchell	2,333		
Labour	D. A. Herriott	2,229		
Labour	A. J. Simanowitz	2,198		
Conservative	R. Tilbury	1,865		
Conservative	S. J. Stewart	1,838		
Conservative	E. J. Fowler	1,835		
Turnout			40.1	▲7.7%
Registered electors		10,760		
Labour gain from Conservative Resident		Swing		
Labour gain from Conservative Resident		Swing		
Labour gain from Conservative Resident		Swing		

=== Whitehorse Manor ===
Whitehorse Manor (3)
Party	Candidate	Votes	%	±%
Labour	R. T. Bishop	2,009		
Labour	D. B. Spillett	1,963		
Labour	S. L. Eaton	1,921		
Conservative	M. W. George	1,049		
Conservative	Mrs J. E. Langley	1,024		
Conservative	C. Ackerman	1,003		
Turnout			30.1	▲7.6%
Registered electors		10,501		
Labour gain from Conservative		Swing		
Labour gain from Conservative		Swing		
Labour gain from Conservative		Swing		

=== Woodcote & Coulsdon West ===
Woodcote & Coulsdon West (3)
Party	Candidate	Votes	%	±%
Conservative	Mrs N. B. Booth	2,604		
Conservative	S. E. Brassington	2,589		
Conservative	R. D. May	2,553		
Liberal	J. Stride	710		
Liberal	R. G. Abdey	677		
Liberal	S. N. Rolph	656		
Labour	M. H. Webb	530		
Labour	W. H. Ulyett	505		
Labour	Mrs L. M. Peers	496		
Turnout			33.0	▼10.4%
Registered electors		11,709		
Conservative hold		Swing		
Conservative hold		Swing		
Conservative hold		Swing		

=== Woodside ===
Woodside (3)
Party	Candidate	Votes	%	±%
Labour Co-op	J. A. Keeling	2,510		
Labour Co-op	D. A. Hougham	2,417		
Labour Co-op	H. T. P. Mellor	2,378		
Conservative	A. G. Hollands	1,367		
Conservative	L. D. Emerton	1,351		
Conservative	Miss I. S. Rodda	1,291		
Liberal	R. Horwell	241		
Liberal	B. F. Steggles	201		
Liberal	Mrs C. A. Steggles	183		
Communist	Mrs Q. E. Knight	153		
National Front	C. A. Mitchell	90		
National Front	J. Scott	77		
Turnout			39.0	▲7.8%
Registered electors		11,094		
Labour Co-op gain from Conservative		Swing		
Labour Co-op gain from Conservative		Swing		
Labour Co-op gain from Conservative		Swing		
