= 1964 Croydon London Borough Council election =

1964 local election in England

Croydon Council Election, 1964
7 May 1964	1968 →

All 70 councillors in 20 wards and 10 aldermen in the London Borough of Croydon 36 seats needed for a majority
- Turnout: 38.2%
	First party	Second party	Third party
Leader	Unknown	Unknown	Unknown
Party	Conservative	Labour	Independent
Last election	New Council	New Council	New Council
Seats before	N/A	N/A	N/A
Seats won	26	24	20
Popular vote	104,456	88,885	28,658
Leader of the Council before election
New Council
Elected Leader
Unknown
Conservative

The 1964 Croydon Council election took place on 7 May 1964 to elect members of Croydon London Borough Council in London, England. The whole council was up for election and the council went into no overall control.

== Background ==
These elections were the first to the newly formed borough. Previously elections had taken place in the County Borough of Croydon and Coulsdon and Purley Urban District. These boroughs and districts were joined to form the new London Borough of Croydon by the London Government Act 1963.

A total of 171 candidates stood in the election for the 60 seats being contested across 20 wards. These included a full slate from the Labour party, while the Conservative and Liberal parties stood 42 each. Other candidates included 9 Residents, 9 Conservative Residents, 5 Independents and 4 Communists. All wards were three-seat wards.

This election had aldermen as well as directly elected councillors. The Conservatives got 5 aldermen, Labour 3 and Independents 2.

The Council was elected in 1964 as a "shadow authority" but did not start operations until 1 April 1965.

== Election result ==
The results saw no party gain overall control of the new council with both the Conservatives and Labour each winning 21 of the 60 seats. Overall turnout in the election was 38.2%. This turnout included 855 postal votes.

Croydon Council election result 1964 - Councillors
Party	Seats	Gains	Losses	Net gain/loss	Seats %	Votes %	Votes	+/−
Conservative	21				35.0		104,456	
Labour	21				35.0		88,885	
Independent	18				30.0		28,658	
Liberal	0				0.0		28,506	
Communist	0				0.0		481	

Croydon Council election result 1964 - Aldermen
Party	Seats	Gains	Losses	Net gain/loss	Seats %	Votes %	Votes	+/−
Conservative	5				50.0			
Labour	3				30.0			
Independent	2				20.0			

Croydon Council election result 1964 - Total Seats
Party	Seats	Gains	Losses	Net gain/loss	Seats %	Votes %	Votes	+/−
Conservative	26				35.14			
Labour	24				34.29			
Independent	20				28.57			

↓
26	20	24
Con	Independent	Labour

== Ward results ==
=== Addiscombe ===
Addiscombe (3)
Party	Candidate	Votes	%	±%
Labour	R. Taverner	2,300		
Labour	J. Grieve Smith	2,269		
Labour	L. W. Wood	2,247		
Conservative	D. Nye	1,789		
Conservative	A. W. Elliott	1,733		
Conservative	A. F. Gloak	1,724		
Liberal	R. Tapsell	662		
Liberal	K. Evans	613		
Liberal	K. Simmons	560		
Turnout		4,799	42.8	
Registered electors		11,211		
Labour win (new seat)				
Labour win (new seat)				
Labour win (new seat)				

=== Bensham Manor ===
Bensham Manor (3)
Party	Candidate	Votes	%	±%
Residents	F. C. Emmerson	1,818		
Residents	H. A. Steward	1,774		
Residents	R. J. Bowker	1,732		
Labour	H. Stevens	1,451		
Labour	A. G. Housden	1,424		
Labour	Mrs. A. G. Watson	1,410		
Liberal	R. Thorpe	705		
Liberal	W. Day	704		
Liberal	R. Humphrey	634		
Communist	Mrs. A. Waddell	86		
Turnout		4,097	35.9	
Registered electors		11,423		
Residents win (new seat)				
Residents win (new seat)				
Residents win (new seat)				

=== Broad Green ===
Broad Green (3)
Party	Candidate	Votes	%	±%
Labour	Miss L. Overton	2,151		
Labour	F. G. West	2,084		
Labour	A. G. Wright	2,064		
Conservative	J. M. Stamford	924		
Conservative	Miss M. Baker-Rogers	890		
Conservative	D. M. Stranack	868		
Communist	C. Young	153		
Turnout		3,188	29.3	
Registered electors		10,866		
Labour win (new seat)				
Labour win (new seat)				
Labour win (new seat)				

=== Central ===
Central (3)
Party	Candidate	Votes	%	±%
Conservative	J. L. Aston	2,558		
Conservative	V. W. H. Bendall	2,450		
Conservative	A. Lawton	2,423		
Labour	E. L. Hall	1,273		
Labour	Mrs. E. Sutcliffe	1,241		
Labour	H. Stopps	1,181		
Liberal	A. Sandison	315		
Liberal	H. T. Quemby	234		
Liberal	B. T. Morgan	216		
Turnout		4,116	37.3	
Registered electors		11,043		
Conservative win (new seat)				
Conservative win (new seat)				
Conservative win (new seat)				

=== Coulsdon East ===
Coulsdon East (3)
Party	Candidate	Votes	%	±%
Residents	Miss J. C. Simpson	1,831		
Residents	A. Bonsier	1,814		
Residents	L. Blair	1,748		
Liberal	Mrs. B. Bashford	1,055		
Liberal	L. B. Groves	987		
Liberal	T. J. Austin	981		
Labour	F. A. Davies	730		
Labour	Mrs. M. O. Bentley	728		
Labour	E. F. Nedeles	685		
Independent	S. B. Stray	214		
Turnout		3,685	34.4	
Registered electors		10,726		
Residents win (new seat)				
Residents win (new seat)				
Residents win (new seat)				

=== East ===
East (3)
Party	Candidate	Votes	%	±%
Independent	W. H. Simpson	2,762		
Independent	H. E. Styles	2,730		
Independent	D. J. Sutton	2,710		
Labour	J. F. Reed	962		
Labour	R. Reed	944		
Labour	P. Gibson	943		
Liberal	V. Roberts	468		
Liberal	R. Williams	468		
Liberal	Miss P. H. Tapsell	462		
Turnout		4,294	38.1	
Registered electors		11,271		
Independent win (new seat)				
Independent win (new seat)				
Independent win (new seat)				

=== New Addington ===
New Addington (3)
Party	Candidate	Votes	%	±%
Labour	J. Cooper	2,509		
Labour	T. J. Laffin	2,460		
Labour	Mrs. V. L. Rooke	2,354		
Conservative	M. H. Piper	452		
Conservative	R. Rogers	419		
Conservative	P. R. Gilham	398		
Liberal	Mrs. R. Ainsworth	243		
Liberal	F. Lett	227		
Liberal	A. Wild	217		
Turnout		3,158	30.6	
Registered electors		10,308		
Labour win (new seat)				
Labour win (new seat)				
Labour win (new seat)				

=== Norbury ===
Norbury (3)
Party	Candidate	Votes	%	±%
Conservative	W. E. Ross-Gower	2,491		
Conservative	R. G. Willis	2,479		
Conservative	G. Levy	2,477		
Labour	P. H. Benson	982		
Labour	Mrs. G. Walker	970		
Labour	L. Cowling	923		
Liberal	T. P. Harwood	918		
Liberal	R. Thompson	834		
Liberal	B. Nagle	831		
Turnout		4,427	38.1	
Registered electors		11,627		
Conservative win (new seat)				
Conservative win (new seat)				
Conservative win (new seat)				

=== Purley ===
Purley (3)
Party	Candidate	Votes	%	±%
Conservative	D. W. Pudney	2,295		
Conservative	R. W. Kersey	2,221		
Conservative	B. C. Sparrowe	2,129		
Residents	Mrs. D. Pattison	1,231		
Residents	H. B. J. Sturgiss	1,039		
Residents	R. W. Evans	1,036		
Labour	B. G. Hamblin	1,023		
Labour	E. E. Preidel	995		
Labour	W. A. Adams	939		
Turnout		3,981	35.0	
Registered electors		11,378		
Conservative win (new seat)				
Conservative win (new seat)				
Conservative win (new seat)				

=== Sanderstead & Selsdon ===
Sanderstead & Selsdon (3)
Party	Candidate	Votes	%	±%
Conservative	Mrs. E. E. Bray	3,756		
Conservative	M. D. West	3,752		
Conservative	B. H. Rowling	3,693		
Liberal	J. A. Chisholm	2,196		
Liberal	R. H. Jenden	2,089		
Liberal	Mrs. A. L. Cooper	2,045		
Labour	Mrs. P. M. Crow	468		
Labour	F. G. Morriss	439		
Labour	S. W. Davis	431		
Turnout		6,441	57.0	
Registered electors		11,309		
Conservative win (new seat)				
Conservative win (new seat)				
Conservative win (new seat)				

=== Sanderstead North ===
Sanderstead North (3)
Party	Candidate	Votes	%	±%
Conservative	P. W. Rickards	3,635		
Conservative	W. N. Peet	3,611		
Conservative	F. Hargreaves	3,528		
Labour	R. G. M. Jones	811		
Labour	Mrs. L. M. B. Messer	807		
Labour	S. N. Ings	800		
Liberal	Mrs. N. V. Howard	663		
Liberal	G. A. Kemp	597		
Liberal	W. H. White	583		
Turnout		5,075	41.8	
Registered electors		12,149		
Conservative win (new seat)				
Conservative win (new seat)				
Conservative win (new seat)				

=== Shirley ===
Shirley (3)
Party	Candidate	Votes	%	±%
Conservative	Mrs. E. Maycock	3,353		
Conservative	R. C. Nash	3,342		
Conservative	A. G. Weller	3,293		
Labour	A. G. Edwards	1,133		
Labour	G. Stredwick	971		
Labour	H. W. Robertson	960		
Independent	J. T. E. A. Waddell	183		
Turnout		4,475	37.3	
Registered electors		11,993		
Conservative win (new seat)				
Conservative win (new seat)				
Conservative win (new seat)				

=== South Norwood ===
South Norwood (3)
Party	Candidate	Votes	%	±%
Conservative Resident	P. A. Saunders	2,119		
Conservative Resident	Mrs. B. Saunders	2,089		
Conservative Resident	C. E. Kelly	2,056		
Labour	P. Byrne	1,682		
Labour	Mrs. M. Johnson	1,519		
Labour	M. McGovern	1,442		
Liberal	J. Mackenzie	555		
Liberal	P. St. Clare Collis	548		
Liberal	Mrs. P. Weal	468		
Turnout		4,305	36.7	
Registered electors		11,732		
Conservative Resident win (new seat)				
Conservative Resident win (new seat)				
Conservative Resident win (new seat)				

=== Thornton Heath ===
Thornton Heath (3)
Party	Candidate	Votes	%	±%
Labour	S. Sutcliffe	2,168		
Labour	M. E. Mackenzie	2,127		
Labour	J. L. Walker	2,114		
Residents	J. G. Davies	2,031		
Residents	P. Chandler	2,024		
Residents	G. A. Barr	1,981		
Liberal	M. E. Pache	416		
Liberal	M. E. Thomas	401		
Liberal	D. B. Stannard	378		
Turnout		4,691	42.8	
Registered electors		10,952		
Labour win (new seat)				
Labour win (new seat)				
Labour win (new seat)				

=== Upper Norwood ===
Upper Norwood (3)
Party	Candidate	Votes	%	±%
Conservative	K. Edwards	2,412		
Conservative	Mrs. M. C. V. Parfitt	2,371		
Conservative	S. A. Draper	2,334		
Labour	N. Williams	806		
Labour	T. Williams	804		
Labour	E. Smith	802		
Liberal	Leo C. E. Held	460		
Liberal	P. Apps	456		
Liberal	J. Clement	426		
Turnout		3,704	33.9	
Registered electors		10,925		
Conservative win (new seat)				
Conservative win (new seat)				
Conservative win (new seat)				

=== Waddon ===
Waddon (3)
Party	Candidate	Votes	%	±%
Labour	V. Burgos	2,708		
Labour	J. T. Twitchett	2,681		
Labour	P. Whitehead	2,651		
Conservative	Mrs. I. A. Bell	2,193		
Conservative	R. Blackford	2,178		
Conservative	L. J. Young	2,139		
Turnout		5,002	43.0	
Labour win (new seat)				
Labour win (new seat)				
Labour win (new seat)				

=== West Thornton ===
West Thornton (3)
Party	Candidate	Votes	%	±%
Conservative Resident	R. Tilbury	2,348		
Conservative Resident	E. J. Fowler	2,346		
Conservative Resident	E. F. A. Whitehorn	2,346		
Labour	Miss L. L. Scott	2,263		
Labour	T. Harris	2,127		
Labour	F. Bailey	2,125		
Turnout		4,708	43.6	
Registered electors		11,632		
Conservative Resident win (new seat)				
Conservative Resident win (new seat)				
Conservative Resident win (new seat)				

=== Whitehorse Manor ===
Whitehorse Manor (3)
Party	Candidate	Votes	%	±%
Labour	Mrs. P. M. Dammarell	2,153		
Labour	Mrs. D. George	2,143		
Labour	D. B. Spillett	2,068		
Conservative	R. Nicholson	927		
Conservative	J. Matanle	903		
Conservative	I. Morris	901		
Liberal	J. Forsyth	541		
Liberal	T. Grummitt	523		
Liberal	F. Thorns	402		
Communist	I. Southard	64		
Turnout		3,656	33.2	
Registered electors		11,019		
Labour win (new seat)				
Labour win (new seat)				
Labour win (new seat)				

=== Woodcote & Coulsdon West ===
Woodcote & Coulsdon West (3)
Party	Candidate	Votes	%	±%
Conservative	Mrs. N. B. Booth	2,820		
Conservative	W. H. Hannaford	2,805		
Conservative	J. G. Giles	2,350		
Liberal	H. H. Giles	1,061		
Liberal	J. P. Callen	704		
Liberal	R. L. Dawson	660		
Labour	B.T. Harris	497		
Labour	Mrs. E. D. Goatley	460		
Labour	G. J. R. Gemmell	448		
Turnout		3,992	36.2	
Registered electors		11,024		
Conservative win (new seat)				
Conservative win (new seat)				
Conservative win (new seat)				

=== Woodside ===
Woodside (3)
Party	Candidate	Votes	%	±%
Labour	J. A. Keeling	2,378		
Labour	J. T. Bell	2,365		
Labour	K. F. Urwin	2,292		
Conservative	W. Darwell-Taylor	1,434		
Conservative	J. Peters	1,356		
Conservative	D. Winstone	1,346		
Communist	Mrs. Q. E. Knight	178		
Turnout		4,001	35.5	
Registered electors		11,268		
Labour win (new seat)				
Labour win (new seat)				
Labour win (new seat)				
