= 1974 Croydon London Borough Council election =

1974 local election in England

Croydon Council Election, 1974
← 1971	2 May 1974	1978 →

All 60 councillors in 20 wards, and 10 Aldermen in the London Borough of Croydon 36 seats needed for a majority
	First party	Second party	Third party
Leader	Unknown	Unknown	N/A
Party	Conservative	Labour	Other parties
Seats before	38	29	3
Seats won	47	20	3
Seat change	▲9	▼9	0
Leader of the Council before election
Unknown
Conservative
Elected Leader
Unknown
Conservative

The 1974 Croydon Council election took place on 2 May 1974 to elect members of Croydon London Borough Council in London, England. The whole council was up for election and the Conservative Party stayed in overall control of the council.

== Election result ==
Croydon Council election result 1974 - Councillors
Party	Seats	Gains	Losses	Net gain/loss	Seats %	Votes %	Votes	+/−
Conservative	40			▲10	66.67	52.8		
Labour	17			▼10	28.33	30.5		
Independent	3			Steady	5.00			

Croydon Council election result 1974 - Aldermen (1974-78)
Party	Seats	Gains	Losses	Net gain/loss	Seats %	Votes %	Votes	+/−
Conservative	4	0	1	▼1	80.0			
Labour	1	1	0	▲1	20.0			
Independent	0	0	0	Steady	0.0			

Croydon Council election result 1971 - Aldermen (1971-77)
Party	Seats	Gains	Losses	Net gain/loss	Seats %	Votes %	Votes	+/−
Conservative	3				60.0			
Labour	2				40.0			
Independent	0				0.0			
Liberal	0				0.0			

Croydon Council election result 1974 - Total result
Party	Seats	Gains	Losses	Net gain/loss	Seats %	Votes %	Votes	+/−
Conservative	47			▲9	67.14	52.8		
Labour	20			▼9	28.57	30.5		
Independent	3			Steady	4.29			

↓
47	3	20
Con	Independent	Labour

== Ward results ==
=== Addiscombe ===
Addiscombe (3)
Party	Candidate	Votes	%	±%
Labour	Mrs M. M. Walker	2,177		
Labour	Mrs M. E. Curson	2,157		
Labour	L. E. Deane	2,150		
Conservative	D. F. Todd	2,142		
Conservative	J. A. Arnold	2,133		
Conservative	J. C. Mann	2,034		
Liberal	A. S. Morriss	508		
Liberal	B. Foster	493		
Liberal	C. C. Anderson	485		
Majority		8		
Turnout			46.0	▲3.4
Registered electors		10,967		
Labour hold		Swing		
Labour hold		Swing		
Labour hold		Swing		

=== Bensham Manor ===
Bensham Manor (3)
Party	Candidate	Votes	%	±%
Conservative	R. J. Bowker	1,842		
Conservative	A. Bourne	1,800		
Conservative	J. V. Simpson	1,718		
Labour	Mrs S. E. Lord	1,524		
Labour	A. Devesar	1,521		
Labour	J. A. Plinston	1,419		
Liberal	D. R. Capon	738		
Liberal	R. V. Greatorex	711		
Liberal	D. J. Mateer	650		
Majority		194		
Turnout			38.2	▼2.1
Registered electors		11,014		
Conservative gain from Labour		Swing		
Conservative gain from Labour		Swing		
Conservative gain from Labour		Swing		

=== Broad Green ===
Broad Green (3)
Party	Candidate	Votes	%	±%
Labour	Mrs A. M. Watson	1,996		
Labour	P. Byrne	1,939		
Labour	M. Warne	1,913		
Conservative	L. T. Wiles	993		
Conservative	P. R. Woolford	951		
Conservative	J. P. Szadlo	873		
Liberal	R. W. Stephens	465		
Majority		920		
Turnout			34.8	▼4.3
Registered electors		9,749		
Labour hold		Swing		
Labour hold		Swing		
Labour hold		Swing		

=== Central ===
Central (3)
Party	Candidate	Votes	%	±%
Conservative	V. W. H. Bendall	2,883		
Conservative	R. W. Coatman	2,875		
Conservative	I. G. McLeod	2,845		
Labour	F. D. J. Bailey	874		
Labour	E. L. Hall	865		
Labour	A. W. Jones	831		
Liberal	Miss M. K. Allan	540		
Liberal	A. J. Moss	511		
Liberal	J. B. Wheaver	483		
Majority		1,971		
Turnout			38.0	▲2.2
Registered electors		11,632		
Conservative hold		Swing		
Conservative hold		Swing		
Conservative hold		Swing		

=== Coulsdon East ===
Coulsdon East (3)
Party	Candidate	Votes	%	±%
Conservative	Mrs P. A. M. Little	2,638		
Conservative	Mrs K. A. Littlechild	2,582		
Conservative	P. D. Cove	2,535		
Liberal	H. C. E. Lovejoy	1,493		
Liberal	T. J. Austin	1,234		
Liberal	R. G. Stevens	1,209		
Labour	K. M. Cunnane	405		
Labour	Miss K. M. Grady	385		
Labour	B. C. Lawrence	383		
Residents	S. B. Stray	135		
Majority		1,042		
Turnout			41.4	▼3.1
Registered electors		10,752		
Conservative hold		Swing		
Conservative hold		Swing		
Conservative hold		Swing		

=== East ===
East (3)
Party	Candidate	Votes	%	±%
Conservative	W. H. Simpson	3,751		
Conservative	D. J. Sutton	3,658		
Conservative	A. W. Elliott	3,613		
Labour	E. C. King	1,130		
Labour	P. R. Norwood	1,113		
Labour	T. P. Reilly	1,107		
Liberal	N. H. Perry	643		
Liberal	Mrs P. J. Meek	627		
Liberal	L. G. W. Kitchener	599		
Majority		2,483		
Turnout			43.4	▲8.6
Registered electors		12,915		
Conservative gain from Independent		Swing		
Conservative gain from Independent		Swing		
Conservative gain from Independent		Swing		

=== New Addington ===
New Addington (3)
Party	Candidate	Votes	%	±%
Labour	R. J. Page	3,062		
Labour	T. J. Laffin	2,720		
Labour	P. J. Walker	2,626		
Conservative	M. H. Piper	719		
Conservative	K. W. Williams	505		
Conservative	T. M. Angell	483		
Liberal	R. D. George	435		
Independent	R. E. Gayler	366		
Majority		1,907		
Turnout			25.6	▼9.7
Registered electors		16,110		
Labour hold		Swing		
Labour hold		Swing		
Labour hold		Swing		

=== Norbury ===
Norbury (3)
Party	Candidate	Votes	%	±%
Conservative	R. G. Willis	2,481		
Conservative	C. Johnston	2,479		
Conservative	K. M. B. Munro	2,425		
Labour	J. A. E. Beamish-Crooke	1,623		
Labour	A. J. Simanowitz	1,559		
Labour	Mrs P. F. L. Knight	1,556		
Liberal	W. H. Pitt	1,139		
Liberal	G. W. Croton	1,087		
Liberal	N. B. Barnes	1,042		
Majority		802		
Turnout			45.9	▲12.2
Registered electors		11,648		
Conservative hold		Swing		
Conservative hold		Swing		
Conservative hold		Swing		

=== Purley ===
Purley (3)
Party	Candidate	Votes	%	±%
Conservative	Mrs M. E. Campbell	2,988		
Conservative	Mrs J. M. C. Baker	2,945		
Conservative	G. A. Smith	2,874		
Liberal	P. J. Bellamy	667		
Liberal	D. B. Crampton	657		
Liberal	A. H. Rolph	600		
Labour	R. J. Irwin	534		
Labour	Mrs S. D. M. Poole	527		
Labour	S. Supiramanian	478		
Majority		2,207		
Turnout			33.9	▲2.2
Registered electors		12,524		
Conservative hold		Swing		
Conservative hold		Swing		
Conservative hold		Swing		

=== Sanderstead & Selsdon ===
Sanderstead & Selsdon (3)
Party	Candidate	Votes	%	±%
Conservative	Miss C. M. Aplin	3,763		
Conservative	S. E. Sexton	3,735		
Conservative	B. H. Rawling	3,680		
Liberal	Mrs J. P. Coleman	1,396		
Liberal	Michael Richard Lane	1,162		
Liberal	S. J. Paterson	1,124		
Labour	Miss C. A. Webb	503		
Labour	G. C. Daisley	490		
Labour	G. W. Ford	481		
Majority		2,284		
Turnout			46.0	▲4.2
Registered electors		12,129		
Conservative hold		Swing		
Conservative hold		Swing		
Conservative hold		Swing		

=== Sanderstead North ===
Sanderstead North (3)
Party	Candidate	Votes	%	±%
Conservative	P.W. Rickards	3,773		
Conservative	K.A. Wells	3,707		
Conservative	W.N. Peet	3,659		
Liberal	D. Nunneley	1,150		
Liberal	Mrs G.E. Westmoreland	1,105		
Liberal	G.S. Andrews	1,091		
Labour	W.A. Grimes	607		
Labour	J.C. Barlow	603		
Labour	A.J. Woodward	578		
Majority				
Turnout			43.3	▲2.2
Registered electors		12,841		
Conservative hold		Swing		
Conservative hold		Swing		
Conservative hold		Swing		

=== Shirley ===
Shirley (3)
Party	Candidate	Votes	%	±%
Conservative	P. S. Bowness	5,044		
Conservative	D. E. Perry	4,992		
Conservative	Mrs M. M. H. Horden	4,958		
Liberal	R. A. Lightwing	1,335		
Labour	L. Campion	1,318		
Liberal	E. Waller	1,232		
Labour	Miss E. Stallibrass	1,216		
Liberal	Miss S. M. Wallis	1,203		
Majority		3,623		
Turnout			45.4	▲5.7
Registered electors		16,824		
Conservative hold		Swing		
Conservative hold		Swing		
Conservative hold		Swing		

=== South Norwood ===
South Norwood (3)
Party	Candidate	Votes	%	±%
Conservative	Mrs B. Saunders	2,197		
Conservative	P. A. Saunders	2,180		
Conservative	Miss I. S. Rodda	2,067		
Labour	Mrs A. M. Simpson	1,742		
Labour	G. Andrews	1,716		
Labour	B. E. A. Evans	1,701		
Liberal	Trevor J. Barker	475		
Liberal	D. F. Whyte	431		
Liberal	J. H. Hamilton	419		
Majority		325		
Turnout			35.5	▲4.6
Registered electors		12,849		
Conservative hold		Swing		
Conservative hold		Swing		
Conservative hold		Swing		

=== Thornton Heath ===
Thornton Heath (3)
Party	Candidate	Votes	%	±%
Residents	P. T. Chandler	1,925		
Residents	J. G. Davies	1,902		
Residents	W. Blackwood	1,840		
Labour	N. A. Tully	1,696		
Labour	A. F. Rowe	1,693		
Labour	J. L. Walker	1,682		
Communist	Mrs M. I. Lenehan	139		
Majority		144		
Turnout			36.0	▼1.5
Registered electors		10,589		
Residents gain from Labour		Swing		
Residents gain from Labour		Swing		
Residents gain from Labour		Swing		

=== Upper Norwood ===
Upper Norwood (3)
Party	Candidate	Votes	%	±%
Conservative	A. E. Buddle	3,060		
Conservative	Mrs M. C. V. Parfitt	2,999		
Conservative	Mrs P. A. Stelling	2,968		
Labour	Mrs J. A. Blockley	1,311		
Labour	K. M. Roberts	1,286		
Labour	J. R. Burns	1,279		
Liberal	Mrs J. A. Taylor	733		
Liberal	P. W. Austin	717		
Liberal	J. Marsh	700		
Majority		1,657		
Turnout			43.2	▲7.7
Registered electors		12,042		
Conservative hold		Swing		
Conservative hold		Swing		
Conservative hold		Swing		

=== Waddon ===
Waddon (3)
Party	Candidate	Votes	%	±%
Labour	V. Burgos	2,366		
Conservative	M. E. Crick	2,341		
Labour	A. Brett	2,327		
Conservative	J. J. Nea	2,317		
Conservative	M. D. Wunn	2,227		
Labour	B. H. Davies	2,180		
Liberal	Mrs Z. George	537		
Majority		10		
Turnout			42.8	▼6.4
Registered electors		12,076		
Labour hold		Swing		
Conservative gain from Labour		Swing		
Labour hold		Swing		

=== West Thornton ===
West Thornton (3)
Party	Candidate	Votes	%	±%
Conservative	S. J. Stewart	1,613		
Conservative	D. R. Loughborough	1,573		
Conservative	Mrs Y. A. L. Stewart	1,536		
Labour	D. A. Herriott	1,464		
Labour	M. P. Rix	1,439		
Labour	Mrs E. E. Daisley	1,418		
Liberal	R. M. Greenhalgh	725		
Liberal	J. A. Pile-Gray	639		
Liberal	R. G. Rawcliffe	623		
Majority		72		
Turnout			37.0	▼3.1
Registered electors		10,570		
Conservative gain from Labour		Swing		
Conservative gain from Labour		Swing		
Conservative gain from Labour		Swing		

=== Whitehorse Manor ===
Whitehorse Manor (3)
Party	Candidate	Votes	%	±%
Labour	R. T. Bishop	1,557		
Labour	G. E. Mitchell	1,463		
Labour	S. L. Eaton	1,457		
Conservative	A. R. Crook	1,083		
Conservative	G. J. French	1,028		
Conservative	G. E. Jacques	1,022		
Liberal	M. O'Connor	218		
Liberal	J. S. M. Band	214		
Liberal	Miss L. J. Smith	214		
Majority		374		
Turnout			30.5	▲0.4
Registered electors		9,630		
Labour hold		Swing		
Labour hold		Swing		
Labour hold		Swing		

=== Woodcote & Coulsdon West ===
Woodcote & Coulsdon West (3)
Party	Candidate	Votes	%	±%
Conservative	S. E. Brassington	2,867		
Conservative	R. A. Bennett	2,835		
Conservative	R. D. May	2,832		
Liberal	Mrs Margaret R. A. Billenness	1,155		
Liberal	J. Stride	1,106		
Liberal	J. P. Callen	1,077		
Labour	M. H. Webb	307		
Labour	J. M. Dunning	306		
Labour	D. Denver	302		
Majority		1,677		
Turnout			38.2	▲5.2
Registered electors		11,426		
Conservative hold		Swing		
Conservative hold		Swing		
Conservative hold		Swing		

=== Woodside ===
Woodside (3)
Party	Candidate	Votes	%	±%
Labour	D. A. Hougham	1,938		
Labour	J. A. Keeling	1,859		
Labour	A. C. Lord	1,816		
Conservative	E. W. Howell	1,474		
Conservative	D. L. Congdon	1,414		
Conservative	Mrs P. A. Webb	1,397		
Communist	W. Woodard	110		
Majority		342		
Turnout			33.1	▼5.9
Registered electors		10,807		
Labour hold		Swing		
Labour hold		Swing		
Labour hold		Swing		
