= Addiscombe (ward) =

Former ward in Croydon, United Kingdom

Coordinates: 51.381°N 0.081°W

- Former ward for Croydon Council
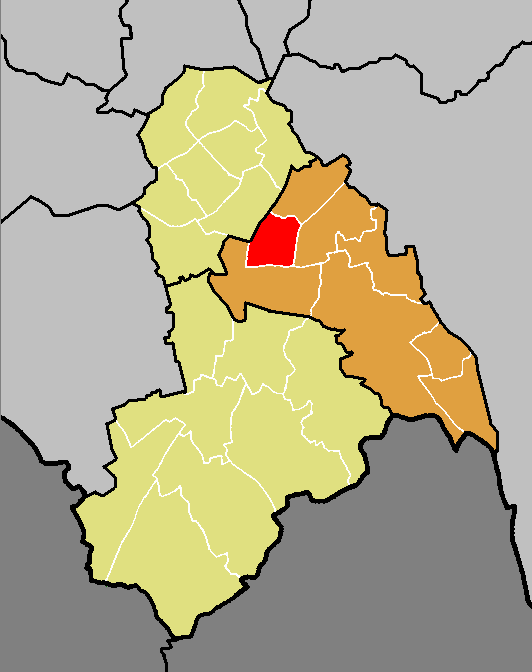
- Boundary of Addiscombe in Croydon Central (orange) within the London Borough of Croydon (yellow) from 2002 to 2018.
- County: Greater London

1965–2018
- Number of councillors: Three
- Replaced by: Addiscombe West
- UK Parliament constituency: Croydon Central

Addiscombe was a ward in the London Borough of Croydon, covering much of the Addiscombe and East Croydon areas of London in the United Kingdom. It extended from East Croydon railway station towards Woodside Green but did not actually cover the retail centre of Addiscombe, which was in the neighbouring Ashburton ward.

The ward formed part of the Croydon Central constituency, which was the most marginal in London at the 2015 General Election, as 165 votes separated the Conservatives and Labour. At the 2017 General Election, Gavin Barwell was ousted as the local MP. Despite achieving the highest numerical vote share for the Conservatives since 1992, he was replaced by Labour's Sarah Jones. Shortly after losing his seat, Barwell was appointed Downing Street Chief of Staff by Theresa May, following the resignations of Fiona Hill and Nick Timothy on 10 June.

The population of the ward at the 2011 Census was 16,883. The ward returns three councillors every four years to Croydon Council. In the 2006 London local elections and the 2014 London local elections, the Green Party candidates got more votes than the Liberal Democrat. At the 2014 council elections, Labour retained all three seats. (The lowest Labour vote was 1,962 and the highest Conservative vote was 1,723.)

For the 2018 London local elections, the ward was abolished, with the majority becoming Addiscombe West (which also includes part of the old Fairfield ward) and part contributing to Addiscombe East (which also includes part of the old Ashburton ward).

== List of Councillors ==
Election	Councillor	Party	Councillor	Party	Councillor	Party
1964	Ward created					
1964	R. Taverner	Labour	J Grieve Smith	Labour	L. W. Wood	Labour
1968	A. W. Elliot	Conservative	A. R. Hills	Conservative	Mrs D. C. H. Hobbs	Conservative
1971	L. E. Deane	Labour	Mrs M. E. Curson	Labour	Miss A. K. Usher	Labour
1973 by-election	L. E. Deane	Labour	Mrs M. E. Curson	Labour	Mrs M. M. Walker	Labour
1978	Muriel C. Elliott	Conservative	Dennis F. Todd	Conservative	Megan Holt-Thomas	Conservative
1982	Peter G. Holt-Thomas	Conservative	Ronald W. Richens	Conservative	Megan Holt-Thomas	Conservative
1986	Jerry Fitzpatrick	Labour	Martin D. Walker	Labour	Nancy T. Irwin	Labour
1990	Jerry Fitzpatrick	Labour	Richard Billington	Conservative	Nancy T. Irwin	Labour
1994	Jerry Fitzpatrick	Labour	Sean Fitzsimons	Labour	Bernadette Khan	Labour
1998	Jerry Fitzpatrick	Labour	Sean Fitzsimons	Labour	Amanda Campbell	Labour
2002	Mark Watson	Labour	Sean Fitzsimons	Labour	Amanda Campbell	Labour
2006	Andrew Price	Conservative	Maria Garcia de la Huerta	Conservative	Russell Jackson	Conservative
2010	Sean Fitzsimons	Labour	Mark Watson	Labour	Patricia Hay-Justice	Labour
2018	Ward abolished					

== Ward result ==
=== 1964 - 1974 ===
==== 1964 ====
Croydon Council Election 1964: Addiscombe (3)
Party	Candidate	Votes	%	±%
Labour	R. Taverner	2,300		
Labour	J. Grieve Smith	2,269		
Labour	L. W. Wood	2,247		
Conservative	D. Nye	1,789		
Conservative	A. W. Elliott	1,733		
Conservative	A. F. Gloak	1,724		
Liberal	R. Tapsell	662		
Liberal	K. Evans	613		
Liberal	K. Simmons	560		
Turnout		4,799	42.8	
Registered electors		11,211		
Labour win (new seat)				
Labour win (new seat)				
Labour win (new seat)				

==== 1968 ====
Croydon Council Election 1968: Addiscombe (3)
Party	Candidate	Votes	%	±%
Conservative	A.W. Elliot	2,380		
Conservative	A.R. Hills	2,261		
Conservative	Mrs D.C.H Hobbs	2,241		
Labour	A.D Goddard	1005		
Labour	S. Boden	993		
Labour	L.W Wood	938		
Liberal	P. Miles	710		
Liberal	Miss P.H. Tapsell	684		
Liberal	V. Martin	653		
Turnout			38.4	▼4.4%
Registered electors		10,863		
Conservative gain from Labour		Swing		
Conservative gain from Labour		Swing		
Conservative gain from Labour		Swing		

==== 1971 ====
Croydon Council Election 1971: Addiscombe (3)
Party	Candidate	Votes	%	±%
Labour	L.E. Deane	2,665		
Labour	Mrs M. E. Curson	2,615		
Labour	Miss A. K. Usher	2,604		
Conservative	W. A. Elliot	2,130		
Conservative	Mrs D. C. H. Hobbs	2,025		
Conservative	J. C. Mann	2,011		
Turnout			42.6	▲4.2%
Registered electors		11,421		
Labour gain from Conservative		Swing		
Labour gain from Conservative		Swing		
Labour gain from Conservative		Swing		

==== 1973 by-election ====
Addiscombe by-election, 2 August 1973
Party	Candidate	Votes	%	±%
Labour	Mrs M. M. Walker	2,161		
Conservative	J. A. Arnold	1,321		
Liberal	B. F. Steggles	790		
Turnout			38.2%	

==== 1974 ====
Croydon Council Election 1974: Addiscombe (3)
Party	Candidate	Votes	%	±%
Labour	Mrs M. M. Walker	2,177		
Labour	Mrs M. E. Curson	2,157		
Labour	L. E. Deane	2,150		
Conservative	D. F. Todd	2,142		
Conservative	J. A. Arnold	2,133		
Conservative	J. C. Mann	2,034		
Liberal	A. S. Morriss	508		
Liberal	B. Foster	493		
Liberal	C. C. Anderson	485		
Majority		8		
Turnout			46.0	▲3.4%
Registered electors		10,967		
Labour hold		Swing		
Labour hold		Swing		
Labour hold		Swing		

=== 1978 - 1998 ===
==== 1978 ====
Croydon Council Election 1978: Addiscombe (3)
Party	Candidate	Votes	%	±%
Conservative	Muriel C. Elliott	2,461		
Conservative	Dennis F. Todd	2,426		
Conservative	Megan Holt-Thomas	2,393		
Labour	James L. Walker, J.P.	2,041		
Labour	Robert J. Irwin	2,038		
Labour	Michael Cohen	2,021		
Liberal	Martin D. Patrick	271		
Liberal	Peter D. Rees	270		
Liberal	Brenda A. Piesing	246		
Majority		352		
Turnout			48.5	▲2.5%
Registered electors		10,744		
Conservative gain from Labour		Swing		
Conservative gain from Labour		Swing		
Conservative gain from Labour		Swing		

==== 1982 ====
Croydon Council Election 1982: Addiscombe (3)
Party	Candidate	Votes	%	±%
Conservative	Peter G. Holt-Thomas	2,312		
Conservative	Megan Holt-Thomas	2,291		
Conservative	Ronald W. Richens	2,211		
Labour Co-op	Nancy T. Irwin	1,480		
Labour Co-op	Rona A. Thomson	1,447		
Labour Co-op	Patricia F.L. Knight	1,418		
Alliance	Angela C. Thomson	992		
Alliance	Paul D. Wiggin	943		
Alliance	Patricia A. Charman	875		
Majority				
Turnout				
Registered electors				
Conservative hold		Swing		
Conservative hold		Swing		
Conservative hold		Swing		

==== 1986 ====
Croydon Council Election 1986: Addiscombe (3)
Party	Candidate	Votes	%	±%
Labour Co-op	Jeremy P. Fitzpatrick	1,680		
Labour Co-op	Martin D. Walker	1,630		
Labour Co-op	Nancy T. Irwin	1,627		
Conservative	Megan Holt-Thomas	1,608		
Conservative	Peter G. Holt-Thomas	1,581		
Conservative	Christopher A. Fink	1,517		
Liberal	Paul D. Wiggin	1,277		
Liberal	Leslie A. Rowe	1,242		
Liberal	Susan E. Wiggin	1,215		
Majority		19		
Turnout				
Registered electors				
Labour Co-op gain from Conservative		Swing		
Labour Co-op gain from Conservative		Swing		
Labour Co-op gain from Conservative		Swing		

==== 1990 ====
Croydon Council Election 1990: Addiscombe (3)
Party	Candidate	Votes	%	±%
Labour Co-op	Jeremy P. Fitzpatrick	2,241		
Labour Co-op	Nancy T. Irwin	2,219		
Conservative	Richard J. Billington	2,088		
Labour Co-op	Martin D. Walker	2,073		
Conservative	Desmond J. Wright	2,009		
Conservative	Robert T.L. Vaudry	1,941		
Green	Patricia A. Matthews	478		
Green	Christopher J. Reeves	424		
Liberal Democrats	Patricia F. West	414		
Majority				
Turnout		4,967	49.3	
Registered electors				
Labour Co-op hold		Swing		
Labour Co-op hold		Swing		
Conservative gain from Labour Co-op		Swing		

==== 1994 ====
Croydon Council Election 1994: Addiscombe (3)
Party	Candidate	Votes	%	±%
Labour Co-op	Jeremy P. Fitzpatrick	2,349		
Labour Co-op	Sean E. Fitzsimons	2,136		
Labour Co-op	Bernadette Khan	1,946		
Conservative	Martin W. Brown	1,784		
Conservative	Hella P. H. El-Droubie	1,572		
Conservative	Mohammad I. Khokhar	1,382		
Liberal Democrats	Kay L. Schilich	614		
Liberal Democrats	Patricia F. West	609		
Green	Russell N. Heath	543		
Independent	James P. Smyth	237		
Majority		162		
Turnout				
Registered electors				
Labour Co-op hold		Swing		
Labour Co-op hold		Swing		
Labour Co-op gain from Conservative		Swing		

Croydon Council Election 1998: Addiscombe (3)
Party	Candidate	Votes	%	±%
Labour Co-op	Jeremy P. Fitzpatrick	1,943		
Labour Co-op	Amanda N. Campbell	1,703		
Labour Co-op	Sean E. Fitzsimons	1,686		
Conservative	Richard D. Barwell	1,393		
Conservative	Richard R. Chatterjee	1,306		
Conservative	Hella P.H. El-Drouble	1,222		
Independent Resident	Stephen P. Collins	533		
Liberal Democrats	Melanie L. Barlow	391		
Liberal Democrats	George W. Schlich	314		
Liberal Democrats	Kay L. Schlich	289		
Majority				
Turnout				
Registered electors				
Labour Co-op hold		Swing		
Labour Co-op hold		Swing		
Labour Co-op hold		Swing		

=== 2002 - 2014 ===
Croydon Council Election 2002: Addiscombe (3)
Party	Candidate	Votes	%	±%
Labour Co-op	Amanda N. Campbell	2,140		
Labour Co-op	Mark Watson	1,968		
Labour Co-op	Sean Fitzsimons	1,940		
Conservative	Desmond J. Wright	1,383		
Conservative	Alexander C.C. Camden	1,366		
Conservative	Ronald W. Richens	1,329		
People's Choice	Stephen P. Collins	453		
People's Choice	Carol West	404		
People's Choice	Stephen D.A. Collins	387		
Majority				
Turnout				
Labour Co-op hold		Swing		
Labour Co-op hold		Swing		
Labour Co-op hold		Swing		

Croydon Council Election 2006: Addiscombe (3)
Party	Candidate	Votes	%	±%
Conservative	Andrew Price	1,948		
Conservative	Maria Garcia de la Huerta	1,842		
Conservative	Russell Jackson	1,793		
Labour	Sean Fitzsimons	1,672		
Labour	Amanda Campbell	1,653		
Labour	Mark Watson	1,607		
Green	Mario Barnsley	850		
Liberal Democrats	Paul Rogers	760		
Turnout		4,437	40.0%	
Conservative gain from Labour		Swing		
Conservative gain from Labour		Swing		
Conservative gain from Labour		Swing		

Croydon Council Election 2010: Addiscombe (3)
Party	Candidate	Votes	%	±%
Labour	Sean Fitzsimons	2,839	38.4	
Labour	Mark Watson	2,683	36.3	
Labour	Patricia Hay-Justice	2,497	33.8	
Conservative	Maria Garcia de la Huerta	2,445	33.1	
Conservative	Andrew Price	2,171	29.4	
Conservative	Robert King	2,076	28.1	
Liberal Democrats	Christopher Adams	1,569	21.2	
Liberal Democrats	Gavin Howard-Jones	1,400	19.0	
Liberal Democrats	Ejnar Sorensen	1,195	16.2	
Green	Tracey Hague	432	5.9	
Green	David Petro	353	4.8	
Green	Martyn Post	352	4.8	
UKIP	Peter Staveley	296	4.0	
Turnout		7,386	62.9%	
Labour gain from Conservative		Swing		
Labour gain from Conservative		Swing		
Labour gain from Conservative		Swing		

Croydon Council Election 2014: Addiscombe (3)
Party	Candidate	Votes	%	±%
Labour	Sean Fitzsimons	2,165		
Labour	Patricia Hay-Justice	2,027		
Labour	Mark Watson	1,962		
Conservative	David Harmes	1,723		
Conservative	Lisa Terry	1,653		
Conservative	Partha Chatterjee	1,630		
UKIP	Peter Staveley	659		
Green	Paul Anderson	458		
Green	Esther Sutton	439		
Green	Joseph Hague	362		
Liberal Democrats	Christopher Adams	266		
Liberal Democrats	William Tucker	186		
Liberal Democrats	Gavin Howard-Jones	169		
Turnout				
Labour hold		Swing		
Labour hold		Swing		
Labour hold		Swing		
Turnout		4,995	42.5%	
