= 1982 Croydon London Borough Council election =

1982 local election in England

Croydon Council Election, 1982
← 1978	6 May 1982	1986 →

All 70 seats, in 27 wards in the London Borough of Croydon 36 seats needed for a majority
	First party	Second party	Third party
Leader	Peter Bowness	Unknown	Unknown
Party	Conservative	Labour	Independent
Leader since	1976	N/A	N/A
Leader's seat	Spring Park	N/A	N/A
Last election	56 councillors	11 councillors	3 councillors
Seats before	54	13	3
Seats won	62	5	3
Seat change	▲8	▼8	0
Percentage	55.6%	18.6%	3.2%
- Map of the results of the 1982 Croydon Council election.
Leader of the Council before election
Peter Bowness
Conservative
Elected Leader
Peter Bowness
Conservative

The 1982 Croydon Borough Council election took place on 6 May 1982 to elect members of Croydon London Borough Council in London, England. The whole council was up for election and the Conservative Party stayed in overall control of the council.

== Election result ==
Croydon Council election result 1982
Party	Seats	Gains	Losses	Net gain/loss	Seats %	Votes %	Votes	+/−
Conservative	62	6	0	+8	88.6	55.6		
Alliance	0	0	0	0	0.0	22.5		
Labour	5	0	6	-8	7.1	18.6		
Independent	3	0	0	0	4.3	3.2		

== Ward results ==
=== Addiscombe ===
Addiscombe (3)
Party	Candidate	Votes	%	±%
Conservative	Peter G. Holt-Thomas	2,312		
Conservative	Megan Holt-Thomas	2,291		
Conservative	Ronald W. Richens	2,211		
Labour Co-op	Nancy T. Irwin	1,480		
Labour Co-op	Rona A. Thomson	1,447		
Labour Co-op	Patricia F.L. Knight	1,418		
SDP	Angela C. Thomson	992		
Liberal	Paul David Wiggin	943		
SDP	Patricia A. Charman	875		
Majority				
Turnout				
Registered electors				
Conservative hold		Swing		

=== Ashburton ===
Ashburton (2)
Party	Candidate	Votes	%	±%
Conservative	Edwin S. Arram	1,818		
Conservative	Donald J. Sutton	1,708		
SDP	Tyrrell Burgess	617		
Liberal	Leslie A. Christie	587		
Labour	Howard C. Gurr	552		
Labour	Rodney G.D. Matlock	511		
Turnout				
Conservative hold		Swing		
Conservative hold		Swing		

=== Bensham Manor ===
Bensham Manor (3)
Party	Candidate	Votes	%	±%
Conservative	Ronald J. Bowker	1,918		
Conservative	Joan M. Goodman	1,848		
Conservative	Julia A. Wood	1,705		
Labour	Robert N. Hughes	1,236		
Labour	Robert P. Priest	1,149		
Labour	Ian Smedley	1,146		
SDP	Janice M. Crockett	811		
SDP	Jai M. Mathur	773		
Liberal	John A. Pile-Gray	875		
Ecology	Timothy A.J Rowe	111		
Turnout				
Conservative hold		Swing		

=== Beulah ===
Beulah (2)
Party	Candidate	Votes	%	±%
Conservative	Philomena M. Drummond-Brown	1,815		
Conservative	Klemens E. Zdanowicz	1,751		
SDP	Graham F. Williams	613		
Liberal	Anthony M. Everett	598		
Labour	Alice R. Tyrell	495		
Labour	Roger J. Borne	479		
Turnout				
Conservative hold		Swing		
Conservative hold		Swing		

=== Broad Green ===
Broad Green (3)
Party	Candidate	Votes	%	±%
Conservative	Gillian Charman	1,216		
Conservative	Andrew John Pelling	1,173		
Conservative	Douglas A.H. Sharman	1,151		
Labour	James A. Keeling	1,138		
Labour	Victor Martin	1,067		
Labour	Ann M. Watson	1,057		
SDP	Moira C. Bamfield	846		
Liberal	Charles E. Burling	831		
Liberal	David E. Beeke	823		
Communist	Peter A.G. Latham	78		
Turnout				
Conservative gain from Labour		Swing		

=== Coulsdon East ===
Coulsdon East (3)
Party	Candidate	Votes	%	±%
Conservative	Stanley E. Littlechild	2,627		
Conservative	Pamela A.M. Little	2,600		
Conservative	Martin A. Levie	2,461		
Liberal	Peter Hasler Billenness	1,333		
Liberal	Ian R. Atkins	1,276		
SDP	Richard M. Wevill	1,270		
Labour	Patrick J. Hearn	267		
Labour	Andrew M. Conway	252		
Labour	Edward J. Phillips	228		
Turnout				
Conservative hold		Swing		
Conservative hold		Swing		
Conservative hold		Swing		

=== Croham ===
Croham (3)
Party	Candidate	Votes	%	±%
Conservative	Ian Croft	2,961		
Conservative	John P.B. Hecks	2,944		
Conservative	Keith A. Wells	2,884		
SDP	Christopher G. Peacock	1,308		
Liberal	Richard T. Mascall	1,215		
Liberal	Richard E. Tudway	1,148		
Labour	William E. Short	382		
Labour	Pauline H. Scharp	373		
Labour	David J. White	342		
Turnout			44.8	
Registered electors		10,187		
Conservative hold		Swing		
Conservative hold		Swing		
Conservative hold		Swing		

=== Fairfield ===
Fairfield (3)
Party	Candidate	Votes	%	±%
Conservative	John L. Aston	3,195		
Conservative	Robert W. Coatman	3,170		
Conservative	Michael D. Wunn	3,031		
SDP	Vincent C. Green	1,027		
SDP	Niccola Swan	984		
Liberal	Desmond J. Stockley	913		
Labour	Frank D.J. Bailey	638		
Labour	Ian E. Chandler	591		
Labour	Edward L. Hall	588		
Turnout				
Conservative hold		Swing		
Conservative hold		Swing		
Conservative hold		Swing		

=== Fieldway ===
Fieldway (2)
Party	Candidate	Votes	%	±%
Labour Co-op	James L. Walker	1,144		
Labour Co-op	Mary M. Walker	904		
Conservative	Roy T. Miller	433		
Liberal	Yvette M.G. Luff	409		
SDP	David A. Partridge	381		
Conservative	Adrian J. Goodenough	323		
Turnout				
Labour Co-op hold		Swing		
Labour Co-op hold		Swing		

=== Heathfield ===
Heathfield (3)
Party	Candidate	Votes	%	±%
Conservative	Richard F. Pannett	3,039		
Conservative	Mary M.H. Horden	2,942		
Conservative	Nicholas E.V. Perry	2,847		
Liberal	Michael J. Douglas	883		
SDP	Kathleen M. Crawford	856		
Liberal	Robert J. Williams	844		
Labour	Beatrice A. Pollard	380		
Labour	Sean Jones	355		
Labour	Stella M. Harvey	353		
Turnout				
Conservative hold		Swing		
Conservative hold		Swing		
Conservative hold		Swing		

=== Kenley ===
Kenley (2)
Party	Candidate	Votes	%	±%
Conservative	Margaret E. Campbell	2,192		
Conservative	Brian G. Smith	2,061		
Liberal	Ivo Nicholls	664		
SDP	Robert D. Riddett	634		
Labour	Roger M. Burgess	268		
Labour	Malcolm E. Kilsby	263		
Turnout				
Conservative hold		Swing		
Conservative hold		Swing		

=== Monks Orchard ===
Monks Orchard (2)
Party	Candidate	Votes	%	±%
Conservative	Derek R. Loughborough	2,011		
Conservative	Albert W. Elliott	1,993		
Independent	Kenneth R. Brown	1,421		
Independent	Hugh W. Allardyce	1,344		
SDP	Anne M. Brown	392		
Labour	John C. Barlow	336		
Labour	Donald A. Ray	316		
Turnout				
Conservative hold		Swing		
Conservative hold		Swing		

=== New Addington ===
New Addington (3)
Party	Candidate	Votes	%	±%
Labour	Reginald J. Page	1,357		
Labour	Trevor J. Laffin	1,174		
Labour	Alan C. Lord	1,087		
Conservative	William J. Eastoe	779		
Conservative	Robert A. Bell	746		
Conservative	Michael W. Coatman	723		
SDP	Anthony E.W. Gooch	577		
SDP	Ainslie C. Bazely	492		
Liberal	Frances M. Williams	484		
Turnout				
Labour hold		Swing		
Labour hold		Swing		
Labour hold		Swing		

=== Norbury ===
Norbury (3)
Party	Candidate	Votes	%	±%
Conservative	Colin Johnston	2,682		
Conservative	Keith M. B. Munro	2,657		
Conservative	Bryan J. Kendall	2,637		
Liberal	Barry J. Davies	1,258		
Liberal	David Armer	1,222		
SDP	Geoffrey Morley	1,197		
Labour	Mark B. Howarth	755		
Labour	Ruth A. Ishmael	687		
Labour	Janet M. Pickering	623		
Turnout				
Conservative hold		Swing		
Conservative hold		Swing		
Conservative hold		Swing		

=== Purley ===
Purley (3)
Party	Candidate	Votes	%	±%
Conservative	Peter J. F. Macdonald	3,065		
Conservative	George A. Smith	3,029		
Conservative	David L. Congdon	2,988		
SDP	Sheila Buckle	1,071		
SDP	Katherine A. Mundy	1,048		
Liberal	Graham P. Wickham	1,021		
Labour	Barry V. Bulled	243		
Labour	Jean Barlow	236		
Labour	Julie A. Taylor	235		
Turnout				
Conservative hold		Swing		
Conservative hold		Swing		
Conservative hold		Swing		

=== Rylands ===
Rylands (2)
Party	Candidate	Votes	%	±%
Conservative	Guy L. Harding	1,365		
Conservative	Peter R. Crockford	1,294		
Labour	Robert C. E. Brooks	722		
Labour	Philip A. Durban	678		
SDP	Diana M. Dawe	488		
Liberal	Joseph Short*	273		
Turnout				
Conservative hold		Swing		
Conservative hold		Swing		

- Liberal Party withdrew their support during the campaign.

=== Sanderstead ===
Sanderstead (2)
Party	Candidate	Votes	%	±%
Conservative	Ronald W. Haskins	2,649		
Conservative	David N. Bowen	2,570		
Liberal	Raymond W. Bustin	889		
SDP	Eric J. Mann	853		
Labour	Keith M. Roberts	163		
Labour	Lillian L. Scott	158		
Turnout				
Conservative hold		Swing		
Conservative hold		Swing		

=== Selsdon ===
Selsdon (2)
Party	Candidate	Votes	%	±%
Conservative	Dudley S. Mead	2,637		
Conservative	Ian L. Aarons	2,553		
Liberal	James S. Forrest	1,393		
SDP	Stephen A. Hall	1,254		
Labour	Michael P. J. Phelan	196		
Labour	John H. Robinson	157		
Turnout				
Conservative hold		Swing		
Conservative hold		Swing		

=== South Norwood ===
South Norwood (3)
Party	Candidate	Votes	%	±%
Conservative	Beryl Saunders	1,785		
Conservative	Paul A. Saunders	1,752		
Conservative	Eileen J. Longhorn	1,745		
Liberal	Ian S. Manders	965		
Liberal	Jeremy E. Cope	927		
Liberal	Leslie Anthony Rowe	927		
Labour	Leni Gillman	600		
Labour	Jonathan Pickering	588		
Labour	Peter Luxton	585		
Majority		780		
Turnout				
Registered electors				
Conservative hold		Swing		

=== Spring Park ===
Spring Park (2)
Party	Candidate	Votes	%	±%
Conservative	Denis E. Perry	3,023		
Conservative	Peter Spencer Bowness	2,976		
SDP	David B. Crampton	686		
Liberal	John F. Chandler	602		
Labour	John R. March	498		
Labour	Stephen H. Tiller	429		
Turnout				
Conservative hold		Swing		

=== Thornton Heath ===
Thornton Heath (3)
Party	Candidate	Votes	%	±%
Residents	John G. Davies	1,705		
Residents	Gordon Poluck	1,664		
Residents	William Blackwood	1,539		
Labour	Patrick Byrne	1,006		
Labour	Frances M. Conn	912		
Labour	Herbert W. Tyler	909		
SDP	Clive Bone	741		
SDP	William G. A. Graham	732		
Liberal	Julia S. Gordon	695		
Majority		533		
Turnout				
Registered electors				
Residents hold		Swing		
Residents hold		Swing		
Residents hold		Swing		

=== Upper Norwood ===
Upper Norwood (2)
Party	Candidate	Votes	%	±%
Conservative	Ernest G. Noad	1,579		
Conservative	Margaret C. V. Perfitt	1,543		
Labour	Patrick T. Ryan	555		
Liberal	Leo C. E. Held	533		
SDP	Lawrence West	514		
Labour	Andrew M. S. Ward	508		
Turnout				
Conservative hold		Swing		
Conservative hold		Swing		

=== Waddon ===
Waddon (3)
Party	Candidate	Votes	%	±%
Conservative	James J. Nea	2,328		
Conservative	Reginald H. Kent	2,285		
Conservative	Beverley S. Winborn	2,151		
Labour	Christopher R. Allen	1480		
Labour	Hartley Dean	1400		
Labour	Martin D. Walker	1382		
SDP	Janet M. Sinclair	773		
Liberal	Joan M. Leck	764		
SDP	Ian Wonacott	681		
Turnout				
Conservative hold		Swing		
Conservative hold		Swing		
Conservative hold		Swing		

=== West Thornton ===
West Thornton (3)
Party	Candidate	Votes	%	±%
Conservative	Eric W. Howell	1,771		
Conservative	Yvonne A. L. Stewart	1,738		
Conservative	Anita C. Drummond-Brown	1,715		
Labour	Margaret R. Mansell	1,310		
Liberal	Alan R. Mead	1,170		
Labour	James J. Penman	1,135		
SDP	Peter R. Norwood	1,090		
Labour	Arnold J. Simanwitz	1,044		
Liberal	David R. Dayus	1,017		
Majority		405		
Turnout				
Registered electors				
Conservative hold		Swing		
Conservative hold		Swing		
Conservative hold		Swing		

=== Whitehorse Manor ===
Whitehorse Manor (3)
Party	Candidate	Votes	%	±%
Conservative	Corinne A. Cook	1,165		
Conservative	Arthur S. Dwan	1,132		
Conservative	Denis V. Read	1,092		
Liberal	Robert F. Holyoake	932		
Liberal	Iain Gordon	916		
Labour	George E. Mitchell	908		
Labour	Robert T. Bishop	885		
Labour	Julian V. Gannon	842		
Liberal	Jill L. Servian	842		
National Front	Nicholas John Griffin	50		
National Front	Doris A. Merritt	36		
Majority		160		
Turnout				
Registered electors				
Conservative gain from Labour		Swing		

=== Woodcote & Coulsdon West ===
Woodcote & Coulsdon West (3)
Party	Candidate	Votes	%	±%
Conservative	Alan K. Carey	3,214		
Conservative	Samuel J. Moore	3,096		
Conservative	Maurice A. Fowler	3,093		
SDP	Maureen E. E. House	1,078		
Liberal	John P. Callen	1,052		
Liberal	Herbert H. Giles	1,006		
Labour	David Denver	238		
Labour	Geoffrey G. Daisley	219		
Labour	James Nugent	217		
Majority		2,015		
Turnout				
Registered electors				
Conservative hold		Swing		
Conservative hold		Swing		
Conservative hold		Swing		

=== Woodside ===
Woodside (2)
Party	Candidate	Votes	%	±%
Conservative	Dennis F. Todd	1,200		
Conservative	Stephen G. Ghero	1,122		
Labour	John M. Laney	659		
Labour	Stanley L. Eaton	611		
SDP	Paul F. West	411		
Liberal	Henry Russell	380		
Turnout				
Conservative hold		Swing		
Conservative hold		Swing		
