= Ministerial and other Maternity Allowances Act 2021 =

Act of the Parliament of the United Kingdom

Ministerial and other Maternity Allowances Act 2021 (Note: Section 7(3).)
- Act of Parliament
- Parliament of the United Kingdom
- Long title: An Act to make provision for payments to or in respect of Ministers and holders of Opposition offices on maternity leave.
- Citation: 2021 c. 5
- Introduced by: Penny Mordaunt, Paymaster General (Commons); Lord True, Minister of State for the Cabinet Office (Lords)
- Territorial extent: England and Wales; Scotland; Northern Ireland; (Note: Section 7(3).)

Dates
- Royal assent: 1 March 2021
- Commencement: 1 March 2021 (Note: Section 7(2).)
Other legislation
Amends	House of Commons Disqualification Act 1975; Constitutional Reform and Governance Act 2010
Relates to	Ministerial and Other Salaries Act 1975

Status: Current legislation

History of passage through Parliament

Text of statute as originally enacted

Revised text of statute as amended

The Ministerial and other Maternity Allowances Act 2021 (c. 5) is an act of the Parliament of the United Kingdom that allows ministers and paid opposition figures to take up to six months maternity leave at full pay.

== History ==
It was announced on 4 February 2021 that the government was going to update the law to allow Attorney General Suella Braverman, who was expecting her second child, to take six months of maternity leave.

The act received royal assent on 1 March 2021. It was passed as introduced, except for that the gender-neutral "person" was replaced with "mother" or "mother or expectant mother", after some MPs and lords complained.

Adoption, shared parental leave, longer-term sickness absence, unpaid ministerial roles and the position of backbench MPs were all set to be revisited before the summer recess in 2021.

== Mechanism ==
The act creates a discretionary power for the Prime Minister and for the Leaders of the Opposition in the House of Commons and House of Lords to grant certain office holders six months maternity leave at full pay.

In the case of ministers, the Prime Minister may designate that person a Minister on Leave, an office which comes with the salary of that person's previous office (or current office if reshuffled) for up to six months. Another person may then be appointed to the Minister on Leave's previous office.

In the case of opposition figures, the act allows an additional person to be appointed to a paid opposition office for up to six months.

== Alternatives ==
Ministers have no rights of maternity leave, as their status and constitutional position means that they are not treated as workers or employees.

=== Members of Parliament ===
The act does not extend to MPs, for which it has been criticised; backbench MPs are able to take informal maternity leave, but not all of their duties are covered during their absence. The first "locum MP" job, to cover constituency work but not sit or vote in the House of Commons, was advertised in 2019.

=== Ministers ===
The Ministerial Code also states that:

Ministers who wish to take maternity leave (of up to 6 months), or other extended absence from Government, must seek the permission of the Prime Minister. Where the Prime Minister agrees to such a request, the Minister must not exercise their functions as a Minister during their period of absence unless this is agreed by the Permanent Secretary and the Minister who is temporarily covering the Ministerial responsibilities.

Several ministers have taken maternity leave, as early as in 2001. However, the rationale behind the act is that the caps on salaries and the number of ministers limits the capacity to create covering posts. It is also said that the nature of Cabinet minister and Law Officer offices means that they could not take advantage of the route previously available to ministers.

== Criticisms ==
The act has been criticised by Stella Creasy for not extending to all MPs. It has also been pointed out by Wendy Chamberlain that locum provisions are not yet available for male MPs on paternity leave. Additionally, Yvette Cooper has argued that the act does not include any provisions for male ministers to take longer paternity leave.

James Hand says that the House of Commons spent four hours over the bill, with significant time being devoted to the question of using gender neutral language. He also points out that the act does not provide a right for ministers to take maternity leave (but it remains at the discretion of the Prime Minister) and that, under the act, the minister has to technically vacate their office, contrary to the concept of maternity keeping-in-touch days, though as members of the Government they can continue to be briefed. Finally, Hand says that the act gives no guarantee that the Minister on Leave would revert to their original position when they return, concluding "[t]his rushed provision, with its partial and in some ways retrogressive approach to maternity leave (in forcing the minister to leave their post), is attributable to the Attorney-General being set to take maternity leave within a month."

== List of ministers on leave ==
List of ministers on leave
Name	Office	Interim	Designated	Reinstated	Ref.
Suella Braverman	Attorney General for England and Wales; Advocate General for Northern Ireland	Michael Ellis	2 March 2021	10 September 2021	
The Baroness Penn	Baroness in Waiting	The Baroness Chisholm of Owlpen	15 September 2021 (or before)	26 January 2022	
Michelle Donelan	Secretary of State for Science, Innovation and Technology	Chloe Smith	28 April 2023	20 July 2023	
Julia Lopez	Minister of State for Media, Tourism and Creative Industries	Sir John Whittingdale OBE	9 May 2023	20 December 2023	
The Baroness Penn	Parliamentary Under-Secretary of State for Housing and Communities	The Baroness Swinburne	1 March 2024	5 July 2024 (Replaced at the General Election)	
Satvir Kaur	Parliamentary Secretary for the Cabinet Office	Josh Simons	7 September 2025	22 February 2026	

== See also ==
- House of Commons Disqualification Act 1975
- Ministerial and Other Salaries Act 1975
