= Joanna Penn, Baroness Penn =

British politician (born 1985)

The Right Honourable The Baroness Penn
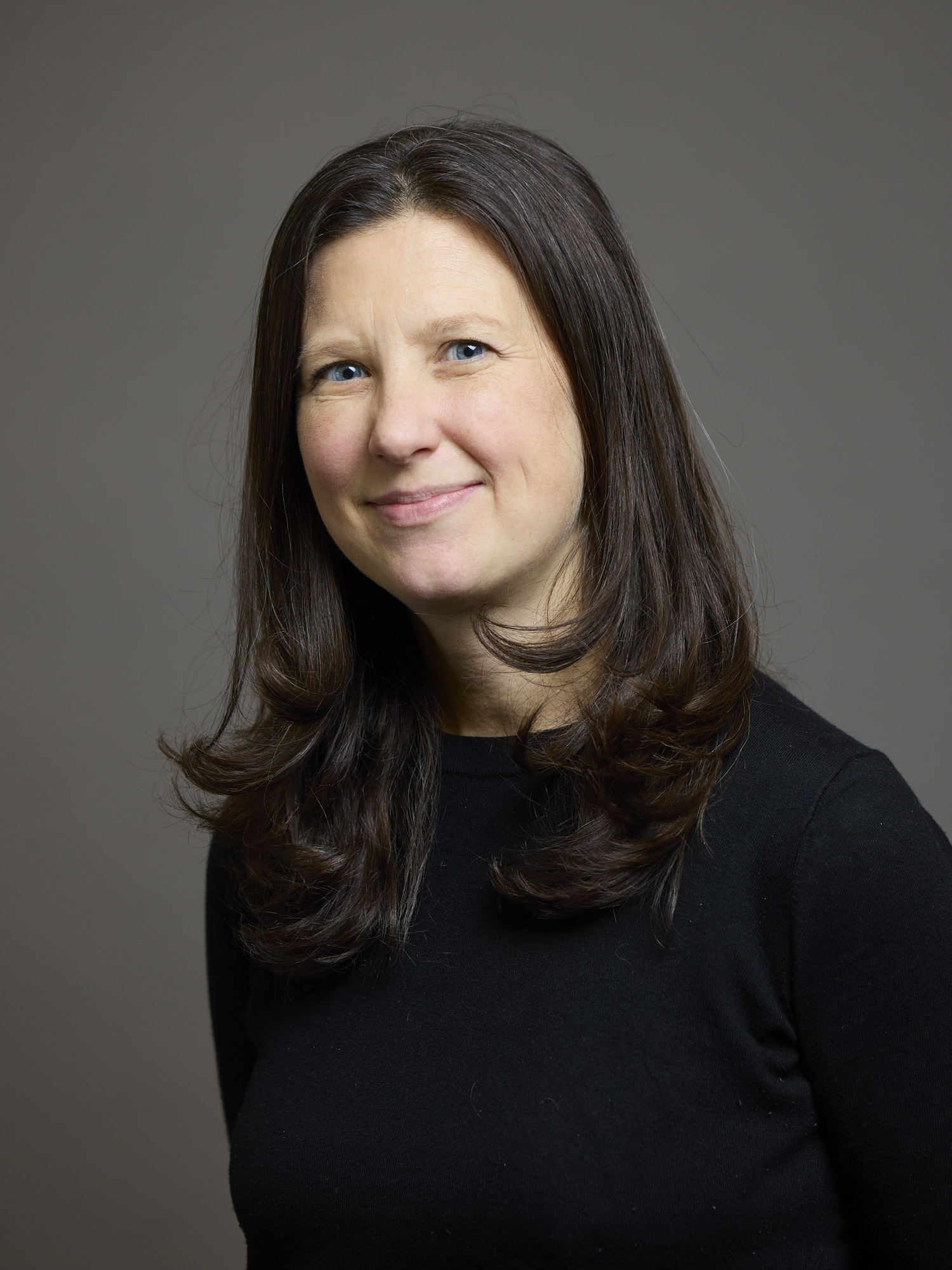
- Official portrait, 2024

Minister on Leave
- In office 1 March 2024 – 5 July 2024
- Prime Minister: Rishi Sunak
- Interim: The Baroness Swinburne (Note: In accordance with the Ministerial and other Maternity Allowances Act 2021, Swinburne has temporarily served as Parliamentary Under-Secretary during Penn's maternity leave.)
- In office 15 September 2021 – 26 January 2022
- Prime Minister: Boris Johnson
- Interim: The Baroness Chisholm of Owlpen (Note: In accordance with the Ministerial and other Maternity Allowances Act 2021, Chisholm temporarily served as Baroness-in-waiting during Penn's maternity leave.)

Parliamentary Under-Secretary of State for Housing and Communities
- In office 13 November 2023 – 1 March 2024
- Prime Minister: Rishi Sunak
- Preceded by: Office established
- Succeeded by: The Baroness Swinburne

Parliamentary Secretary for the Treasury
- In office 26 October 2022 – 13 November 2023
- Prime Minister: Rishi Sunak
- Preceded by: Office established
- Succeeded by: The Baroness Vere of Norbiton

Baroness-in-waiting Government Whip
- In office 4 February 2022 – 26 October 2022
- Prime Minister: Boris Johnson
- Preceded by: The Baroness Chisholm of Owlpen
- In office 19 March 2020 – 15 September 2021
- Prime Minister: Boris Johnson
- Preceded by: The Lord Bethell
- Succeeded by: The Baroness Chisholm of Owlpen

Member of the House of Lords
- Lord Temporal
- Life peerage 10 October 2019

Downing Street Deputy Chief of Staff
- In office July 2016 – July 2019
- Prime Minister: Theresa May
- Chief of Staff: Fiona Hill and Nick Timothy; Gavin Barwell
- Preceded by: Oliver Dowden
- Succeeded by: Cleo Watson and Katie Lam

Personal details
- Born: 1985 (age 40–41)
- Party: Conservative
- Education: University of Oxford (BA); Harvard Kennedy School (MPA)

Joanna Carolyn Penn, Baroness Penn (born 1985), known as JoJo Penn, is a British politician and political advisor. She was a baroness-in-waiting (a government whip) from March 2020 to September 2022. From November 2023 to March 2024, she was Parliamentary Under-Secretary of State for Housing and Communities in the Department for Levelling Up, Housing and Communities.

== Biography ==
Penn studied history and politics at the University of Oxford, graduating with a Bachelor of Arts (BA) degree in 2006. She later studied at Harvard University, completing a Master of Public Policy (MPP) degree in 2015.

She served as Deputy Chief of Staff to Prime Minister Theresa May from 2016 to 2019. In September 2019, it was announced that she would be made a Conservative Party life peer in the 2019 Prime Minister's Resignation Honours. She was created Baroness Penn, of Teddington in the London Borough of Richmond, on 10 October 2019.

Penn became the youngest member of the House of Lords when she joined the House on 21 October 2019: she was succeeded as baby of the house by Lord Harlech following the election on 14 July 2021. She made her maiden speech on 30 January 2020 during a debate on Defence, Diplomacy and Development Policy. From 29 October 2019 to 21 April 2020, she was a member of the Lord's Science and Technology Committee. She served as a baroness-in-waiting, a junior government whip, from 19 March 2020 to 20 September 2022. Between 30 October 2022 and 13 November 2023, she was a parliamentary secretary, the most junior level of minister, in HM Treasury.
