= Kay Swinburne, Baroness Swinburne =

British politician (born 1967)

The Right Honourable The Baroness Swinburne
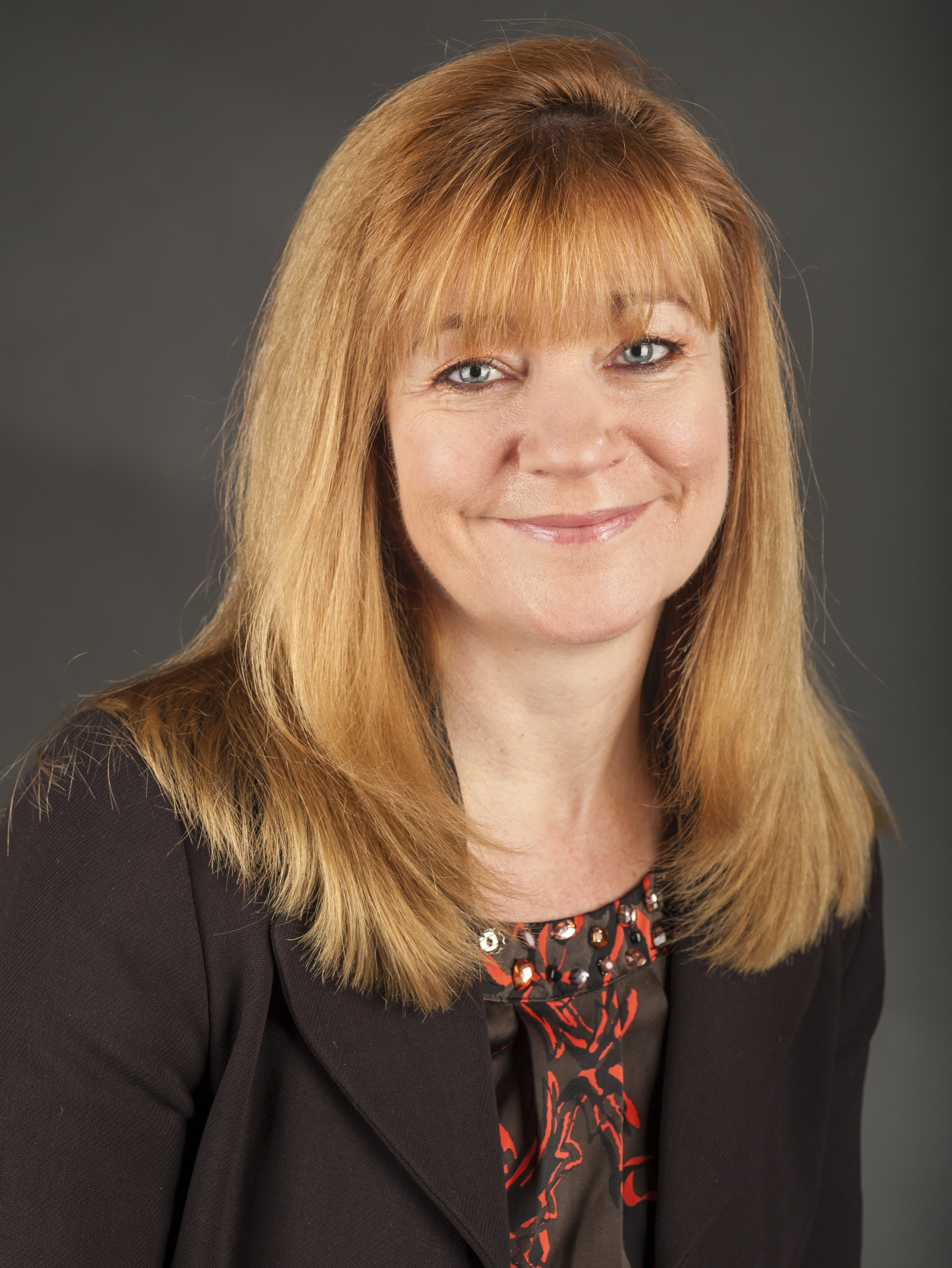
- Swinburne in 2014

Parliamentary Under-Secretary of State for Housing and Communities
- In office 1 March 2024 (Note: In accordance with the Ministerial and other Maternity Allowances Act 2021, Swinburne temporarily served in the position during Penn's maternity leave) – 5 July 2024
- Prime Minister: Rishi Sunak
- Preceded by: The Baroness Penn
- Succeeded by: The Baroness Taylor of Stevenage

Baroness-in-Waiting Government Whip
- In office 2 June 2023 – 29 February 2024
- Prime Minister: Rishi Sunak

Member of the House of Lords
- Lord Temporal
- Life peerage 20 June 2023

Member of the European Parliament for Wales
- In office 14 July 2009 – 1 July 2019
- Preceded by: Jonathan Evans
- Succeeded by: James Wells

Personal details
- Born: Jacqueline Kay Jones; 8 June 1967 (age 59) Aberystwyth, Wales
- Party: Conservative
- Children: 2
- Education: Llandysul Grammar School
- Alma mater: King's College London; University of Surrey

Jacqueline Kay Swinburne, Baroness Swinburne (née Jones; born 8 June 1967) is a British politician and life peer. She was a member of the European Parliament (MEP) for Wales between 2009 and 2019, representing the Conservative Party, and became a member of the House of Lords in 2023. She was appointed Parliamentary Under-Secretary of State for Housing and Communities from 1 March 2024 for Baroness Penn as a Minister on Leave.

== Early life and education ==
Swinburne was born Jacqueline Kay Jones in Aberystwyth, Wales, on 8 June 1967. She was raised in West Wales, and can speak fluent Welsh. Swinburne was educated at Llandysul Grammar School and went on to earn a BSc degree in biochemistry and microbiology in 1988 and a PhD degree in medical research in 1991 from King's College London, followed by an MBA degree in 1994 from the University of Surrey, before starting a career in international healthcare and investment banking. Swinburne received national media attention in 1999 when she resigned from Deutsche Bank after experiencing sexual discrimination.

== Early political career ==
She served as a Town Councillor on Ledbury Parish Council from 29 May 2003 to 24 March 2009 and was elected mayor of Ledbury in 2006..

Later in 2006, she also stood to be a Conservative Councillor on Herefordshire County Council and was duly appointed, serving as Chair of the Health Scrutiny committee. During this time she also served as Deputy Chair of the North Herefordshire Conservatives Association (NHCA). She stepped down as a County Councillor in March 2010.

On 28 March 2008 it was announced that she was to head the Welsh Conservatives' list of candidates for the 2009 European Parliament election, effectively guaranteeing her a seat in the European Parliament. Her election in June 2009 was notable for being the first time the Conservative Party topped an election in Wales since 1918.

== Wales ==
She is a member of the Welsh Conservatives and the Welsh Conservatives Party Board.

She was reselected by the Welsh Conservative Party as its lead candidate for the European election in 2014, following a meeting of the Welsh Regional Selection College in May 2013.

== European Parliament ==
In the European Parliament, Swinburne sat in the European Conservatives and Reformists (ECR Group), a Conservative Party led group created in 2009 to campaign for urgent reform of the European Union. She is Vice Chairman of the Committee on Economic and Monetary Affairs, and a member of the European Parliament's delegation to the United States of America. She was formerly a substitute for the EuroMed Parliamentary Assembly (DMED): the Union for the Mediterranean which promotes economic integration and democratic reform across 16 neighbours to the EU's south in North Africa and the Middle East and the European Parliament Delegation to Palestine. She also was the ECR Group's Co-ordinator on the Special Committee on the Financial, Economic and Social Crisis (CRIS). Her extensive meetings with lobbyists for the financial industry have been criticised.

=== European Parliament committees ===
As Vice Chairman:

- Committee on Economic and Monetary Affairs (ECON) [9 March 2017 – 2019]

As Member:

- Committee on Economic and Monetary Affairs (ECON) [16 September 2009 – ?]
- Special Committee on the Financial, Economic and Social Crisis [08.10.2009 – 31 July 2011]

As Substitute:

- Committee on the Environment, Public Health and Food Safety [1 July 2014 – ?]
- Committee on Culture and Education (CULT) [25 January 2012 – 1 July 2014]
- Committee on Foreign Affairs (AFET) [07.09.2009 – 23 June 2010]

During her first term as MEP for Wales, she was the Rapporteur on three reports for the ECON committee:

- REPORT on regulation of trading in financial instruments – dark pools etc. [16 November 2010]

– Examined the period of unprecedented change European capital markets have undergone, both due to a changed regulatory environment, post MiFID implementation, and due to the technological advancements over the same period. – All set in the context of the period of financial crisis, which the report followed.

- REPORT on the proposal for a regulation of the European Parliament and of the Council on improving securities settlement in the European Union and on central securities depositories (CSDs) and amending Directive 98/26/EC [14 February 2013]

– Following the 2008–09 crisis, financial regulators and policy makers have widened their interest in the post trade environment to ensuring that our financial infrastructure mitigates counterparty risk where possible; is resilient; and serves the needs of the end investor. – This report closely examined the current post-trade settlement systems to assess where improvements can be made to best serve the needs of all investors. Further objectives of this legislation include the encouragement of new entrants so as to foster a competitive environment, a reduction of cross-border settlement costs and the mitigation of counterparty risk which are all addressed in the report.

- REPORT on Recovery and resolution framework for non-bank institutions [18 June 2013]

– The report focused specifically on Central Counterparts (CCPs) and Central Security Depositories (CSDs) as key critical market infrastructure that needs strong recovery and resolution tools, such as living wills, as a priority.

In addition she also acted as Shadow Rapporteur on a number of reports including the Markets in Financial Instruments Directive and Regulation (MiFID II) report, the legislation implementing G20 criteria for clearing, reporting and trading of derivatives, the establishment of the Euro European Supervisory Authorities including the ESRB, legislation on economic governance and the establishment of a single banking supervisor for the Eurozone.

=== European Parliament delegations ===
Member

- Delegation for relations with the United States [1 January 2017 – January 2020]

As Substitute:

- Delegation for relations with the Palestinian Legislative Council (DPLC) [16 September 2009 – 18 October 2009]
- Delegation to the Parliamentary Assembly of the Union for the Mediterranean (DMED) [16 September 2009 – 27 March 2012]
- Delegation for relations with Switzerland and Norway and to the EU-Iceland Joint Parliamentary Committee and the European Economic Area (EEA) Joint Parliamentary Committee (DEEA) [16 September 2009 – 1 January 2017]

== House of Lords ==
On 2 June 2023, it was announced that Swinburne would be made a life peer on being appointed a baroness-in-waiting and a whip in the House of Lords, as part of the 2023 Special Honours. She was created Baroness Swinburne, of Llandysul in the County of Ceredigion, on 20 June, and was introduced to the House of Lords on 22 June.

== Political achievements ==
As coordinator for the ECR group and UK spokesman on Economic and Monetary Affairs, she has successfully negotiated a number of dossiers concerning the UK's key priority on Europe of Financial Services as well as being part of the global reform agenda since the start of the financial crisis. These include EMIR and MiFID which focus on fulfilling the UK's G20 commitment to reform of the derivatives markets. She was also the committee's Rapporteur on a dossier concerning post trade settlement process; this was the first time in 12 years that a UK Conservative has been nominated by the committee to take a leading role on a financial services file.

During the political negotiations within the Parliament concerning the newly proposed Banking Union, she gained all political groups' support for a requirement for all of the detailed rules involved in financial services to have a double majority for both Euro zone and non-Euro zone members to be in favour before it could pass into law.It helped to protect the UK's place within the single market, and changed the way in which decisions would be made as parts of the EU become more integrated than others.

A key political achievement was also successfully securing a legislative requirement for a Legal Entity Identifier for Financial Transactions which is now being processed in a facility in North Wales, thereby linking her work on financial services back to her constituency.

She has also prioritised working with the other 4 Welsh MEPs where possible, in particular concerning the use of electronic identification tags for sheep, where the Commission for the first time received a letter from all of the MEPs of one region collectively. As a result of this and a more concerted campaign by others, she has secured a more proportionate approach that recognises the difficulties that Welsh farmers may have otherwise experienced.

After the Brexit referendum, Kay Swinburne was appointed Vice Chairman of the Economic and Monetary Affairs committee in the European Parliament.

=== Campaigns ===
- 'Save the Bee': Launched at the Royal Welsh Show, Summer 2011, to increase public awareness of the plight of bee populations in the UK, and Wales in particular. Rates of decline have reached up to 39% in the last five years.
- 'Tell us your red-tape problems': Swinburne called on entrepreneurs and leaders of small and medium-sized enterprises (SMEs) in Wales to contact her with their chief concerns over burdensome rules and regulations – particularly those emanating from Brussels. A campaign designed to raise awareness but also to deal with legislative problems encountered by small businesses in their day-to-day running. The move followed an initiative by the European Commissioner for Industry and Entrepreneurship, Antonio Tajani, saying he wanted to discover the 10 most-restrictive pieces of legislation for SMEs on the EU's statute books.

== Notes ==
European Parliament
Preceded by Jonathan Evans	Member of European Parliament for Wales; 2009–2019	Succeeded by James Wells
