= Nick Timothy =

British politician (born 1980)

Nick Timothy CBE MP
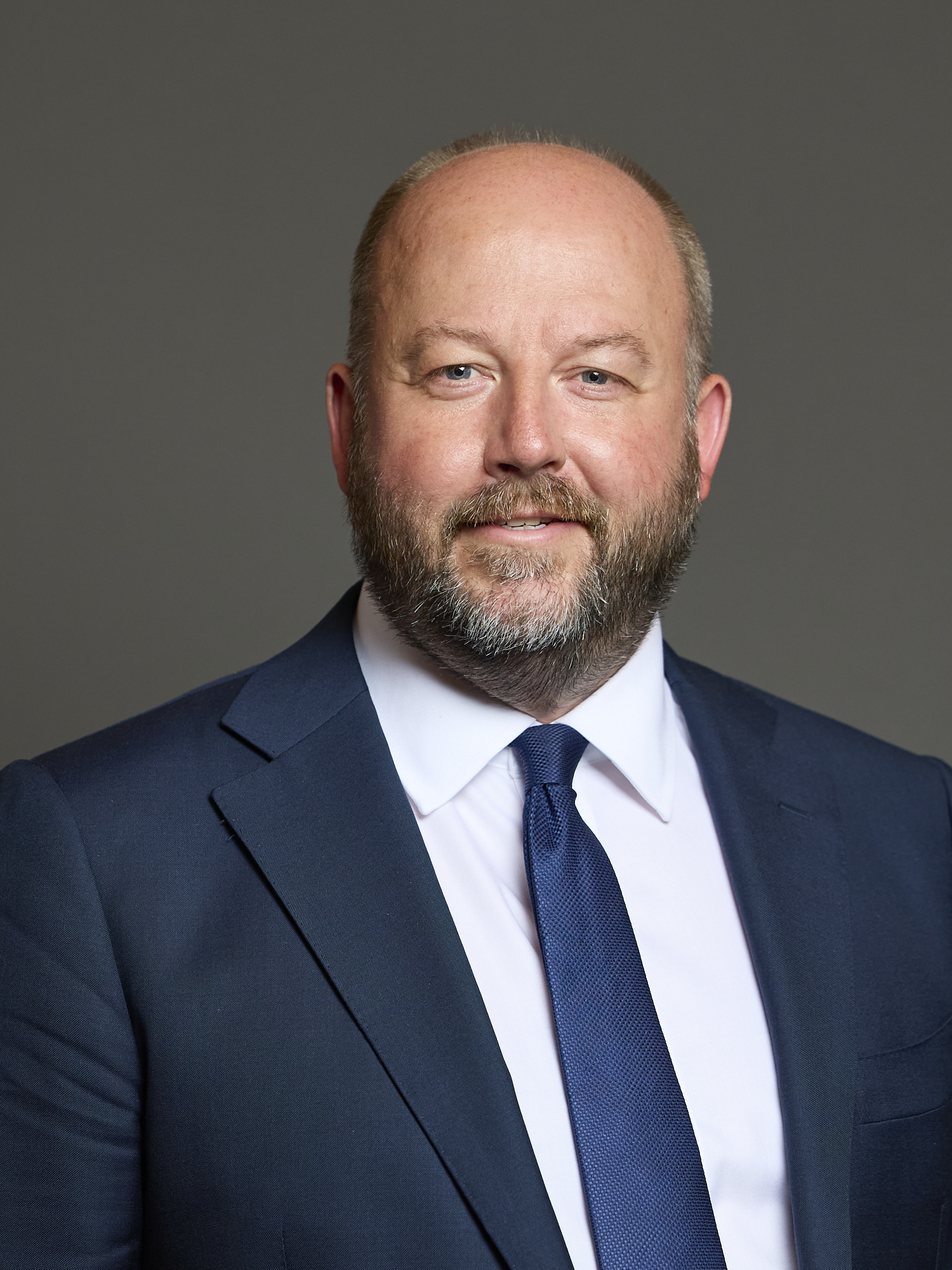
- Official portrait, 2024

Shadow Secretary of State for Justice Shadow Lord Chancellor
- Incumbent
- Assumed office 15 January 2026
- Leader: Kemi Badenoch
- Preceded by: Robert Jenrick

Member of Parliament for West Suffolk
- Incumbent
- Assumed office 4 July 2024
- Preceded by: Matt Hancock
- Majority: 3,247 (7.1%)

Downing Street Chief of Staff
- In office 14 July 2016 – 9 June 2017 Serving with Fiona Hill
- Prime Minister: Theresa May
- Deputy: Joanna Penn
- Preceded by: Edward Llewellyn
- Succeeded by: Gavin Barwell

Personal details
- Born: Nicholas James Timothy; March 1980 (age 46) Birmingham, West Midlands, England
- Party: Conservative
- Children: 3
- Education: University of Sheffield (BA)
- Website: nicktimothy.com

Nicholas James Timothy CBE (born March 1980) is a British politician and former special adviser who has been serving as Shadow Secretary of State for Justice and Shadow Lord Chancellor since 2026. A member of the Conservative Party, he has been the Member of Parliament (MP) for West Suffolk since 2024, and was Downing Street Chief of Staff from 2016 to 2017 while Theresa May held a majority.

Born in Birmingham, Timothy attended King Edward VI Aston School in Aston. He studied politics at the University of Sheffield. In the early 2000s, Timothy worked at the Conservative Research Department (CRD) and for the Corporation of London. After working for Association of British Insurers and as a policy adviser for Theresa May, he returned to the CRD in 2007. From 2010 to 2015, Timothy then was a special adviser at the Home Office during May's tenure as Home Secretary, before leaving to become a director at New Schools Network (NSN).

Timothy left NSN to work on May's successful 2016 leadership campaign; he was subsequently appointed joint Downing Street Chief of Staff alongside Fiona Hill. Following the 2017 snap general election in which the Conservative party lost its majority, May faced calls from MPs to dismiss Timothy, and he subsequently resigned as Chief of Staff. After leaving Downing Street, Timothy worked as a columnist for The Daily Telegraph and The Critic. He published his book, Remaking One Nation, in 2020. He unsuccessfully attempted to be selected as the Conservative candidate for Meriden in the 2019 general election.

In July 2023, Timothy was selected as the Conservative prospective parliamentary candidate for West Suffolk. He was elected for the constituency at the 2024 general election with a majority of 7.1%, succeeding former Health Secretary Matt Hancock. In November of the same year, he joined the frontbench as an Opposition Whip under Kemi Badenoch, before being appointed a Shadow Energy Minister in October 2025. In January 2026, following the dismissal of Robert Jenrick, Timothy was promoted to Shadow Secretary of State for Justice and Shadow Lord Chancellor.

== Early life ==
Timothy was born in Birmingham, the son of a steel worker and a school secretary. He was educated at King Edward VI Aston School in Aston, Birmingham, and at the University of Sheffield, where he gained a first in politics. He was the first member of his family to attend university.

Timothy has cited as his inspiration in politics the Birmingham-born Liberal Unionist politician Joseph Chamberlain, of whom he wrote a short biography for the Conservative History Group. He has supported conservative philosophies which he believes promote strong communities that make markets work and has argued the Conservative Party should focus on benefiting all citizens and regions.

== Early career ==
=== Early posts (2001–2010) ===
Following his graduation, Timothy worked at the Conservative Research Department (CRD) for three years, from 2001 to 2004. In 2004, Timothy left the Conservative Research Department to work as corporate affairs adviser for the Corporation of London. He took up a post in 2005 as a policy adviser for the Association of British Insurers. In 2006, Timothy returned to politics after two years in the financial sector, spending a year working for Theresa May – the first of three posts on May's staff. In 2007, Timothy returned to the CRD, where he worked for a further three years.

=== May Home Office (2010–2015) ===
In 2010, Theresa May was appointed Secretary of State at the Home Office and appointed Timothy as a special adviser, focusing on police reform, immigration, and counter-terrorism policy. He spent five years working for the Home Secretary, before leaving, in 2015, to become a Director at the New Schools Network (NSN).

=== New Schools Network (2015–2016) ===
While at the NSN he spoke in favour of ending the 50% Rule which requires oversubscribed Free Schools to allocate half of their places without reference to faith.

During this time, Timothy wrote a regular column for ConservativeHome where he covered a range of issues in addition to the national security threat from China. This included describing the Climate Change Act 2008 as a “unilateral and monstrous act of self-harm” for British industry, criticising the Treasury for ignoring “evidence that mass immigration can hold down wages and displace some workers from the labour market”, and calling for a “coherent governing philosophy with the interests of ordinary people at its heart.”

In 2015, Timothy wrote an article to express his concern that the People's Republic of China was effectively buying Britain's silence on allegations of Chinese human rights abuse and opposing China's involvement in sensitive sectors such as the Hinkley Point C nuclear power station. He criticised David Cameron and George Osborne for "selling our national security to China" and said that "the Government seems intent on ignoring the evidence and presumably the advice of the security and intelligence agencies." He warned that security experts were worried that the Chinese could use their role in the programme to build weaknesses into computer systems which would allow them to shut down Britain's energy production at will and argued that "no amount of trade and investment should justify allowing a hostile state easy access to the country's critical national infrastructure."

In October 2016, the Health Service Journal rated him as the fifth most influential person in the English NHS in 2016.

Timothy has stated that he voted to leave the European Union in the 2016 membership referendum.

=== Downing Street with May (2016–2017) ===
Following David Cameron's resignation as Prime Minister in the wake of the Brexit referendum result, Timothy took a sabbatical from his position at the NSN to work on Theresa May's 2016 leadership campaign. May's campaign was a success and Timothy was appointed Joint Chief of Staff to the Prime Minister on 14 July 2016.

In spring 2017, May called a snap general election. As a result of the election, the Conservative Party lost its majority and became a minority government dependent on the Democratic Unionist Party for their majority. Timothy, along with Fiona Hill, faced immediate calls for his removal. Theresa May was also given an ultimatum by Conservative Members of Parliament, to sack Timothy or face her own leadership challenge.

On 9 June 2017, Timothy resigned as Joint Chief of Staff to the Prime Minister. Reflecting in 2020 on the projected cost of adult social care, Timothy wrote "Many things went wrong in that election campaign, but I resigned as joint Chief of Staff in Downing Street because our social care proposal blew up the manifesto."

=== Away from Westminster (2017–2024) ===
After leaving Downing Street, Timothy worked as a columnist for The Daily Telegraph newspaper and as a sports columnist for The Critic. Timothy is the founder and co-editor of the online newsletter The Conservative Reader. Timothy published a book about the future of conservatism, Remaking One Nation, in 2020.

He also became a business consultant, founding trustee of a new specialist maths school, Chairman of the Future of Conservatism project at Onward, a Senior Policy Fellow at Policy Exchange, a visiting professor at Sheffield University, a visiting fellow at Wadham College, Oxford, and an adviser to the Inter-Parliamentary Alliance on China. In early 2023 he completed an independent review of the Home Office on behalf of the Prime Minister and Home Secretary.

In January 2019 Timothy was appointed as a member of the organising committee of the 2022 Commonwealth Games, to be held in his home city of Birmingham. Timothy also served as a board member of the Department for Education and the Government’s £250 million Sports Survival Package.

==== Brexit and allegations of antisemitism ====
In February 2018, Timothy denied allegations of antisemitism made in the New Statesman by Stephen Bush following the publication of an article of which he was the principal author that alleged the existence of a "secret plot" to stop Brexit by the Jewish philanthropist George Soros. In response, Timothy tweeted: "Throughout my career I've campaigned against antisemitism, helped secure more funding for security at synagogues and Jewish schools". When The Jewish Chronicle reported on Theresa May's pro-Israel stance as Prime Minister, a source said "If [Timothy] was a journalist, and he was Jewish, you could imagine him editing the JC."

==== 2019 general election ====
In November 2019, Timothy failed to be selected as the Conservative candidate for the Meriden constituency in the West Midlands, for the 2019 general election. The seat had previously been held by Caroline Spelman, who opted to stand down as an MP over the "intensity of abuse arising out of Brexit".

==== The Trojan Horse affair ====
In February 2022, The New York Times released a podcast entitled The Trojan Horse Affair which was created by Brian Reed and Hamza Syed. The podcast claimed that Timothy contributed to the scandal when he emailed a Birmingham community centre which was due to host an event entitled "Trojan Horse or Trojan Hoax" in order to shut down the event. In the email it is alleged that Timothy insinuated that the owners of the community centre would be associated with terrorism if they allowed the event to go ahead. Timothy and Michael Gove wrote a joint foreword for a Policy Exchange report with their own account of the events.

== Member of Parliament (2024–present) ==
=== 2024 general election ===
On 30 July 2023, Timothy was selected as the Conservative prospective parliamentary candidate for West Suffolk. This was following Matt Hancock's announcement of standing down from parliament. He defeated incumbent MP for Penrith and The Border, Neil Hudson and former Financial Times journalist Sebastian Payne. He said he hoped to "draw a line" under the controversy of Hancock who was suspended from the Conservative Party after he appeared on I'm a Celebrity...Get Me Out of Here!. Timothy was elected Member of Parliament for West Suffolk at the 2024 general election.

Timothy was appointed as an Opposition Assistant Whip and Shadow Energy Minister by new Conservative Leader Kemi Badenoch in November 2024, and moved to being a Shadow Education Minister in October 2025.

He is a vice-chair of the Conservative Friends of Israel.

=== Net Zero criticism ===
In 2024, Timothy criticised the Labour government for approving the development of a large solar farm in his constituency. He called it an "insult" to locals. This issue gained national attention due to broader debates about renewable energy and rural communities. Timothy says he opposes all ground-mounted solar applications in Suffolk on the basis that it is “bad energy policy, bad farming policy, and simply unfair to Suffolk and East Anglia.”

As a Shadow Energy Minister, Timothy has criticised the Government in Parliament for its lack of ambition on nuclear power, and its “ideological” approach to renewables and carbon pricing. He has appeared in news coverage exposing what he calls the “madness” of net zero, criticising billions in subsidies being paid towards new renewables like wind and solar as well as the Drax power plant. He has responded for the Conservatives during legislative scrutiny of new regulations and in parliamentary debates.

=== Immigration debates ===
On 18 December 2024, Timothy led speeches in a debate he called on immigration and nationality statistics, arguing that mass immigration is “the biggest broken promise in British politics”.

Timothy has also given speeches in Parliament on the Border Security, Asylum and Immigration Bill, arguing "the future of immigration policy must be not just about who comes here, but about who we decide must leave" and "we must accept that not every migrant is the same, and not every culture is equal." He also proposed amendments to the Employment Rights Bill at committee and report stages to regulate the use of substitution clauses in the gig economy that have been widely used to facilitate illegal work for migrants. This later received support from Baroness Penn in the House of Lords.

=== Grooming gangs scandal ===
Timothy has called for the Home Secretary to order the creation of a specialist unit in the National Crime Agency to investigate police officers, councillors, and public officials accused of enabling the grooming gangs or participating in child sexual exploitation. Following allegations revealed by the BBC in July he wrote to the Home Secretary reiterating his demand.

=== Anti-blasphemy bill and free speech ===
On 10 June 2025 Timothy used the Ten-minute rule to introduce the Freedom of Expression (Religion or Belief System) Bill. It sought to clarify that provisions of the Public Order Act 2023 does not apply in the case of "discussion, criticism or expressions of antipathy, dislike, ridicule, insult or abuse of particular religions or the beliefs or practices of their adherents". It was supported by ten MPs including shadow justice secretary Robert Jenrick and independent MP Rupert Lowe. Timothy said:

The Public Order Act is increasingly being used as a blasphemy law to protect Islam from criticism. The act was never intended to do this. Parliament never voted for this, and the British people do not want it. To use the Public Order Act in this way is especially perverse, since it makes a protester accountable for the actions of those who respond with violence to criticism of their faith. This is wrong, and it destroys our freedom of speech. We should be honest that the law is only being used in this way because the authorities have become afraid of the violent reaction of mobs of people who want to impose their values on the rest of us. My bill will put a stop to this and restore our freedom of speech — and our right to criticise any and all religions, including Islam.

The bill was a reaction to the trial of Hamit Coskun and the grievous assault of Salman Rushdie, for which the assailant was sentenced by a jury to the maximum term of 25 years in jail, amongst other events. The National Secular Society amongst others said that the conviction of Coskun revives blasphemy laws. He (Timothy) felt that the Crown Prosecution Service had given "the game away when it first sought to prosecute Coskun for causing “distress” to “the religious institution of Islam”.. appeasing the mob never works. If we allow threats and violence to succeed, more threats and violence will follow until the mob gets its way and imposes its beliefs and culture even more emphatically on the rest of us." The Bill was also proposed as an amendment to the Crime and Policing Bill.

Timothy has campaigned against what he describes as Labour's "rigged 'Islamophobia' consultation", calling for public support to "stop Britain's new Islamic blasphemy laws". This generated media attention around religious freedom and hate crime legislation. The working group responsible delayed the publication of its findings after thousands of people wrote in expressing their opposition.

In March 2026, Timothy attracted controversy after describing a mass Muslim prayer gathering in Trafalgar Square as "an act of domination" and stating that "the domination of public places is straight from the Islamist playbook". Prime Minister Keir Starmer called the remarks "utterly appalling" and urged Conservative leader Kemi Badenoch to dismiss Timothy from the shadow cabinet. Badenoch defended Timothy's right to express his views and stated that she stood by him. London Mayor Sadiq Khan criticised the comments as divisive. In June 2026, during a Commons debate, Education Secretary Bridget Phillipson described the remarks as racist. Timothy rejected this characterisation and Badenoch again defended him, demanding Phillipson apologise for calling Timothy a racist.

=== Local campaigns ===
Timothy has called for a Mildenhall relief road as part of the town’s expansion plans. He has also campaigned for the renewal of the Haverhill to Cambridge rail link, engaging in talks with the Government about reinstating this major transport connection, and proposed a Charter for West Suffolk to manage new development.

He has also backed the horse racing industry during its action over Government proposals to harmonise online gambling taxes, reflecting the interests of Newmarket, the world capital of horse racing, in West Suffolk. He is the Joint Chairman of the APPG on Horseracing and Bloodstock and has made several calls in Parliament for reforms to the way the sport is funded.

Since the election, Timothy has opposed the Government's business tax increases and their impact on the local economy and campaigned to save Suffolk Police from a merger with Norfolk. Timothy has also adopted a sceptical position towards the reorganisation of local government in Suffolk.

=== Shadow cabinet promotion ===
On 15 January 2026, Timothy was appointed Shadow Secretary of State for Justice and Shadow Lord Chancellor following the dismissal of Robert Jenrick earlier that day.

== Personal life ==
Timothy and his family live in West Suffolk. He is an Aston Villa supporter.

== Electoral history ==
General election 2024: West Suffolk
| Party | Candidate | Votes | % | ±% |
|---|---|---|---|---|
| Conservative | Nick Timothy | 15,814 | 34.3 | −30.0 |
| Labour | Rebecca Denness | 12,567 | 27.2 | +5.0 |
| Reform | David Bull | 9,623 | 20.8 | N/A |
| Liberal Democrats | Henry Batchelor | 4,284 | 9.3 | +0.3 |
| Green | Mark Ereira-Guyer | 2,910 | 6.3 | +1.8 |
| Independent | Katie Parker | 485 | 1.1 | N/A |
| Independent | Luke O'Brien | 345 | 0.7 | N/A |
| SDP | Ivan Kinsman | 133 | 0.3 | N/A |
| Majority | | 3,247 | 7.1 | −35.1 |
| Turnout | | 46,331 | 60.1 | −4.6 |
| Registered electors | | 77,149 | | |
| Conservative hold | | Swing | −17.5 | |

Government offices
| Preceded by Edward Llewellyn | Downing Street Chief of Staff; 2016–2017; With: Fiona Hill | Succeeded by Gavin Barwell |
Parliament of the United Kingdom
| Preceded by Matt Hancock | Member of Parliament for West Suffolk; 2024–present | Incumbent |
Political offices
| Preceded by Robert Jenrick | Shadow Secretary of State for Justice; 2026–present | Incumbent |
| Preceded by Robert Jenrick | Shadow Lord Chancellor; 2026–present | Incumbent |
