= 1978 Croydon London Borough Council election =

1978 local election in England

Croydon Council Election, 1978
- 4 May 1978

All 70 seats, in 27 wards in the London Borough of Croydon 36 seats needed for a majority
- Turnout: 41.6%
	First party	Second party	Third party
Leader	Peter Bowness	Unknown	N/A
Party	Conservative	Labour	Other parties
Leader since	1976		N/A
Leader's seat	Spring Park		N/A
Seats before	47	20	3
Seats won	56	11	3
Seat change	▲9	▼9	0
Percentage	59.8%	29.4%	4.29%
Swing	▲7.0%	▲0.8%	▲1.7%
- Map of the results of the 1978 Croydon Council election.
Leader of the Council before election
Peter Bowness
Conservative
Elected Leader
Peter Bowness
Conservative

The 1978 Croydon Council election took place on 4 May 1978 to elect members of Croydon London Borough Council in London, England. The whole council was up for election and the Conservative Party stayed in overall control of the council.

== Background ==
This was the first election to Croydon Council since 1974. This was the first election fought on new boundaries, and the first without Aldermen, increasing the total number of Councillors from 60 to 70.

== Election result ==
Croydon Council election result 1978
Party	Seats	Gains	Losses	Net gain/loss	Seats %	Votes %	Votes	+/−
Conservative	56	9	0	▲9	80.0	59.8		▲7.0
Labour	11	0	9	▼9	15.71	29.4		▲0.8
Liberal	0	0	0	0	0.00	6.6		▼7.7
Other parties	3	0	0	0	4.29	4.1		▲1.7

↓
56	3	11
Con	Others	Labour

== Ward results ==
=== Addiscombe ===
Addiscombe (3)
Party	Candidate	Votes	%	±%
Conservative	Muriel C. Elliott	2,461		
Conservative	Dennis F. Todd	2,426		
Conservative	Megan Holt-Thomas	2,393		
Labour	James L. Walker, J.P.	2,041		
Labour	Robert J. Irwin	2,038		
Labour	Michael Cohen	2,021		
Liberal	Martin D. Patrick	271		
Liberal	Peter D. Rees	270		
Liberal	Brenda A. Piesing	246		
Majority		352		
Turnout			48.5	▲2.5
Registered electors		10,744		
Conservative gain from Labour		Swing		
Conservative gain from Labour		Swing		
Conservative gain from Labour		Swing		

=== Ashburton ===
Ashburton (2)
Party	Candidate	Votes	%	±%
Conservative	William H. Simpson	2,038		
Conservative	Donald J. Sutton	1,851		
Labour	Frank D. J. Bailey	805		
Labour	Dennis W. Finch	770		
Liberal	Leslie A. Christie	230		
Liberal	Barry Foster	206		
Majority		1,046		
Turnout			45.1	
Registered electors		6,972		
Conservative win (new seat)				
Conservative win (new seat)				

=== Bensham Manor ===
Bensham Manor (3)
Party	Candidate	Votes	%	±%
Conservative	Arthur Bourne	2,137		
Conservative	Ronald J. Bowker	2,111		
Conservative	Christopher B. Wesson	1,950		
Labour	Ralph W. Attoe	1,940		
Labour	Amrit P. Devesar	1,879		
Labour	Joseph K. Towns	1,852		
Liberal	Michael J. Walker	316		
Liberal	Peter J. McCarthy	309		
Liberal	Sarah V. Walker	281		
Majority		10		
Turnout			43.3	▲5.1
Registered electors		10,988		
Conservative hold		Swing		
Conservative hold		Swing		
Conservative hold		Swing		

=== Beulah ===
Beulah (2)
Party	Candidate	Votes	%	±%
Conservative	Philomena M. Drummond-Brown	1,993		
Conservative	Klemens E. Zdanowicz	1,849		
Labour	Doris L. George	652		
Labour	William H. R. Johnson	596		
Liberal	Brigid M. Hurn	171		
Liberal	Peter W. Austin			
Majority		1,197		
Turnout			42.1	
Registered electors		6,988		
Conservative win (new seat)				
Conservative win (new seat)				

=== Broad Green ===
Broad Green (3)
Party	Candidate	Votes	%	±%
Labour	James A. Keeling	1,708		
Labour	Ann Watson, J.P.	1,700		
Labour	Michael Warne	1,694		
Conservative	Christopher N. P. Lewis	1,316		
Conservative	Rosemary P. Tomlin	1,304		
Conservative	Joseph P. Szadlo	1,177		
Liberal	Joan H. Leck	305		
Liberal	Roger W. Stephens	279		
Liberal	Gwendoline M. Luxford	274		
Majority		378		
Turnout			37.9	▲3.1
Registered electors		9,624		
Labour hold		Swing		
Labour hold		Swing		
Labour hold		Swing		

=== Coulsdon East ===
Coulsdon East (3)
Party	Candidate	Votes	%	±%
Conservative	Stanley E. Littlechild	2,613		
Conservative	Pamela A. M. Little	2,563		
Conservative	Martin A. Levie	2,451		
Liberal	Jean R. Douglas	556		
Liberal	John M. Payne	554		
Liberal	Raymond G. Abdey	503		
Labour	Jean Barlow	434		
Labour	John M. Dunning	421		
Labour	Leslie E. Deane	419		
Majority		1,895		
Turnout				
Registered electors				
Conservative hold		Swing		
Conservative hold		Swing		
Conservative hold		Swing		

=== Croham ===
Croham (3)
Party	Candidate	Votes	%	±%
Conservative	Paul W. Rickards	2,989		
Conservative	Keith A. Wells	2,922		
Conservative	William N. Peet	2,907		
Labour	Wendy M. Holt	698		
Labour	Mary Jones	673		
Labour	Raymond G. M. Jones	664		
Liberal	Judith A. Stuart	386		
Liberal	Alan J. Hussey	355		
Liberal	John Hatherley	349		
Turnout			41.1	
Registered electors		10,217		
Conservative win (new seat)				
Conservative win (new seat)				
Conservative win (new seat)				

=== Fairfield ===
Fairfield (3)
Party	Candidate	Votes	%	±%
Conservative	Robert W. Coatman, J.P.	3,445		
Conservative	John L. Aston, J.P.	3,436		
Conservative	Peter R. Gilham	3,320		
Labour	Mary E. Curson	925		
Labour	Iain K. Forbes	864		
Labour	Steven Worley	831		
Liberal	John F. Chandler	334		
Liberal	Margaret Slade	322		
Liberal	Kathleen J. Walker	288		
Majority		2,395		
Turnout				
Registered electors				
Conservative win (new seat)				
Conservative win (new seat)				
Conservative win (new seat)				

=== Fieldway ===
Fieldway (2)
Party	Candidate	Votes	%	±%
Labour Co-op	David F. White	1,279		
Labour Co-op	Mary M. Walker	1,264		
Conservative	Roy T. Miller	581		
Conservative	Richard E. Gayler	558		
Majority		683		
Turnout				
Registered electors				
Labour Co-op win (new seat)				
Labour Co-op win (new seat)				

=== Heathfield ===
Heathfield (3)
Party	Candidate	Votes	%	±%
Conservative	Richard F. Pannett	3,017		
Conservative	John Parfitt	2,958		
Conservative	Mary M. H. Horden	2,946		
Labour	David L. Meen	633		
Labour	Bernard E. A. Evans	618		
Labour	Andrew M. S. Ward	583		
Liberal	Robert J. Williams	262		
Liberal	John W. Hardy	244		
Liberal	David A. Leck	225		
Majority		2,313		
Turnout				
Registered electors				
Conservative win (new seat)				
Conservative win (new seat)				
Conservative win (new seat)				

=== Kenley ===
Kenley (2)
Party	Candidate	Votes	%	±%
Conservative	Margaret E. Campbell	1,905		
Conservative	Brian G. Smith	1,806		
Labour	Stephen E. Smart	355		
Labour	Colin F. Whelton	314		
Liberal	Richard L. Dawson	249		
Liberal	Norman McLeod	244		
Independent	Kenneth P. Dulieu	201		
Majority		1,451		
Turnout				
Registered electors				
Conservative win (new seat)				
Conservative win (new seat)				

=== Monks Orchard ===
Monks Orchard (2)
Party	Candidate	Votes	%	±%
Conservative	Albert W. Elliott	1,951		
Conservative	Derek R. Loughborough	1,929		
Independent	Kenneth R. Brown	1,293		
Independent	Hugh W. Allardyce	1,269		
Labour	John C. Barlow	406		
Labour	Edna Briscoe	366		
Majority		636		
Turnout				
Registered electors				
Conservative win (new seat)				
Conservative win (new seat)				

=== New Addington ===
New Addington (3)
Party	Candidate	Votes	%	±%
Labour	Reginald J. Page, J.P.	1,880		
Labour	Trevor J. Laffin	1,719		
Labour	Peter J. Walker	1,686		
Conservative	Alfred J. Doherty	890		
Conservative	Norah W. Beck	841		
Conservative	Adrian A. Bray	836		
National Front	Peter T. Robinson	194		
National Front	Brian A. Eve	173		
National Front	Roland Dummer	154		
Liberal	Frances M. Williams	137		
Majority		796		
Turnout				
Registered electors				
Labour win (new boundaries)				
Labour win (new boundaries)				
Labour win (new boundaries)				

=== Norbury ===
Norbury (3)
Party	Candidate	Votes	%	±%
Conservative	Colin Johnston	2,281		
Conservative	Keith M. B. Munro	2,256		
Conservative	Michael D. O'Mahony	2,223		
Labour	Christopher C. Gibbons	925		
Labour	Shantilal L. H. Shah	854		
Labour Co-op	Maureen E. Tullett	837		
Liberal	Leo C. E. Held	247		
Liberal	Michael J. Walker	223		
Liberal	Josephine M. Croton	222		
Majority		1,298		
Turnout				
Registered electors				
Conservative hold		Swing		
Conservative hold		Swing		
Conservative hold		Swing		

=== Purley ===
Purley (3)
Party	Candidate	Votes	%	±%
Conservative	Peter J. F. Macdonald	3,207		
Conservative	Jacqueline M. C. Baker	3,181		
Conservative	George A. Smith	3,154		
Labour	Kevin W. Allen	614		
Labour	Timothy E. Lamport	603		
Labour	Ursula Alexis	585		
Majority		2,540		
Turnout				
Registered electors				
Conservative win (new boundaries)				
Conservative win (new boundaries)				
Conservative win (new boundaries)				

=== Rylands ===
Rylands (2)
Party	Candidate	Votes	%	±%
Conservative	John C. Mann	1,343		
Conservative	Richard M. Wevill	1,222		
Labour	Stephen J. Bill	1,140		
Labour	Patricia F. L. Knight	1,092		
Liberal	Michael Bethell	133		
Liberal	Maurice E. Pache	118		
Majority		82		
Turnout				
Registered electors				
Conservative win (new seat)				
Conservative win (new seat)				

=== Sanderstead ===
Sanderstead (2)
Party	Candidate	Votes	%	±%
Conservative	David N. Bowen	2,823		
Conservative	Ronald W. Haskins	2,819		
Liberal	Trevor J. Barker	352		
Liberal	June C. Duffelen	352		
Labour	Edward L. Hall	300		
Labour	Eileen E. Daisley, J.P.	298		
Majority		2,467		
Turnout				
Registered electors				
Conservative win (new seat)				
Conservative win (new seat)				

=== Selsdon ===
Selsdon (2)
Party	Candidate	Votes	%	±%
Conservative	Donald J. Johnson	2,269		
Conservative	Ian L. Aarons	2,243		
Liberal	Christina M. Forrest	562		
Liberal	Michael J. Thomas	550		
Labour	David G. Taylor	295		
Labour	John A. E. Beamish-Crooke	286		
Majority		1,681		
Turnout				
Registered electors				
Conservative win (new seat)				
Conservative win (new seat)				

=== South Norwood ===
South Norwood (3)
Party	Candidate	Votes	%	±%
Conservative	Beryl Saunders	1,899		
Conservative	Paul A. Saunders	1,889		
Conservative	Eileen J. Longhorn	1,838		
Labour	Patrick Byrne	1,038		
Labour	Valerie L. Simanowitz	998		
Labour	Alun W. Jones	978		
Liberal	John R. Holoway	242		
Liberal	Yvonne L. Cattermole	205		
Liberal	Alan Taylor	193		
Majority		800		
Turnout				
Registered electors				
Conservative hold		Swing		
Conservative hold		Swing		
Conservative hold		Swing		

=== Spring Park ===
Spring Park (2)
Party	Candidate	Votes	%	±%
Conservative	Peter S. Bowness	3,189		
Conservative	Denis E. Perry	3,167		
Labour	Alan C. Lord	661		
Labour	Frederick W. Bean	644		
Liberal	Roy A. Lightwing	354		
Liberal	Patricia M. Boreham	294		
Majority		2,506		
Turnout				
Registered electors				
Conservative win (new seat)				
Conservative win (new seat)				

=== Thornton Heath ===
Thornton Heath (3)
Party	Candidate	Votes	%	±%
Residents	John G. Davies	2,283		
Residents	William Blackwood	2,265		
Residents	Gordon Poluck	2,198		
Labour	Kenneth J. Kinnard	1,296		
Labour	Susan E. Lord	1,243		
Labour	Mushtaq Ahmad	1,145		
Majority		902		
Turnout				
Registered electors				
Residents hold		Swing		
Residents hold		Swing		
Residents hold		Swing		

=== Upper Norwood ===
Upper Norwood (2)
Party	Candidate	Votes	%	±%
Conservative	Margaret C. V. Parfitt, J.P.	1,695		
Conservative	Phyllis A. Stelling	1,617		
Labour	Keith M. Roberts	832		
Labour	Susan E. Johnson	809		
Liberal	Leo C. E. Held, J.P.	226		
Majority		785		
Turnout				
Registered electors				
Conservative win (new boundaries)				
Conservative win (new boundaries)				

=== Waddon ===
Waddon (3)
Party	Candidate	Votes	%	±%
Conservative	James J. Nea	2,639		
Conservative	Michael D. Wunn	2,459		
Conservative	Reginald H. Kent	2,419		
Labour	Alan Brett	1,682		
Labour	Barry V. Bulled	1,655		
Labour	Christopher Wright	1,512		
Liberal	J. Scott	242		
Workers Revolutionary	J.E. Bean	82		
Majority		453		
Turnout				
Registered electors				
Conservative gain from Labour		Swing		
Conservative hold		Swing		
Conservative gain from Labour		Swing		

=== West Thornton ===
West Thornton (3)
Party	Candidate	Votes	%	±%
Conservative	Yvonne A. L. Stewart	2,017		
Conservative	Ernest G. Noad	1,923		
Conservative	Iris S. Rodda	1,878		
Labour	Stanley J. Boden	1,788		
Labour	Michael P. Rix	1,733		
Labour Co-op	Bernadette R. Supiramaniam	1,457		
Liberal	William H. Pitt	490		
Liberal	Janet R. Pitt	452		
Liberal	David R. Dayus	388		
Majority		90		
Turnout				
Registered electors				
Conservative hold		Swing		
Conservative hold		Swing		
Conservative hold		Swing		

=== Whitehorse Manor ===
Whitehorse Manor (3)
Party	Candidate	Votes	%	±%
Labour	George E. Mitchell, J.P.	1,509		
Labour	Robert T. Bishop	1,508		
Labour	Stanley L. Eaton	1,436		
Conservative	Denis V. Read	1,360		
Conservative	Julia A. Wood	1,330		
Conservative	Hugh J. A. Sawyer	1,324		
Majority		76		
Turnout				
Registered electors				
Labour hold		Swing		
Labour hold		Swing		
Labour hold		Swing		

=== Woodcote & Coulsdon West ===
Woodcote & Coulsdon West (3)
Party	Candidate	Votes	%	±%
Conservative	Alan K. Carey	3,342		
Conservative	Richard D. May	3,332		
Conservative	Maurice A. Fowler	3,274		
Liberal	Margaret R. A. Billenness, J.P.	630		
Liberal	Trevor J. Austin	560		
Liberal	John P. Callen	553		
Labour	Roger M. Burgess	358		
Labour	Sarah A. Bolsover	357		
Labour	Sheila D. Poole	300		
Majority		2,644		
Turnout				
Registered electors				
Conservative hold		Swing		
Conservative hold		Swing		
Conservative hold		Swing		

=== Woodside ===
Woodside (2)
Party	Candidate	Votes	%	±%
Conservative	David L. Congdon	1,440		
Conservative	Stephen G. Ghero	1,171		
Labour	Robert B. Fenton	955		
Labour Co-op	Sinnathamby Supiramaniam	624		
Liberal	Anthony J. Cattermole	187		
Liberal	Surendrakumar I. Patel	105		
Majority		216		
Turnout				
Registered electors				
Conservative gain from Labour		Swing		
Conservative gain from Labour		Swing		
