= 1986 Croydon London Borough Council election =

1986 local election in England

Croydon Council Election, 1986
- 8 May 1986

All 70 seats, in 27 wards in the London Borough of Croydon 36 seats needed for a majority
| | First party | Second party | Third party |
|---|---|---|---|
| Leader | Peter Bowness | Unknown | Unknown |
| Party | Conservative | Labour | Independent |
| Leader since | 1976 | N/A | N/A |
| Leader's seat | Croham | N/A | N/A |
| Last election | 62 councillors | 5 councillors | 3 councillors |
| Seats before | 62 | 5 | 3 |
| Seats won | 44 | 26 | 0 |
| Seat change | ▼18 | ▲21 | ▼3 |
| Percentage | 44.5% | 29.2% |
- Map of the results of the 1986 Croydon Council election.
Leader of the Council before election
Peter Bowness
Conservative
Elected Leader
Peter Bowness
Conservative

The 1986 Croydon Council election took place on 8 May 1986 to elect members of Croydon London Borough Council in London, England. The whole council was up for election and the Conservative party stayed in overall control of the council.

== Election result ==
Croydon Council election result 1986
| Party | Seats | Gains | Losses | Net gain/loss | Seats % | Votes % | Votes | +/− |
|---|---|---|---|---|---|---|---|---|
| Conservative | 44 | 0 | 18 | ▼18 | 62.86 | 44.5 | | |
| Labour | 26 | 21 | 0 | ▲21 | 37.14 | 29.2 | | |
| Alliance | 0 | 0 | 0 | Steady | 0 | 24.4 | | |
| Independent | 0 | 0 | 3 | ▼3 | 0 | | | |

↓
| 44 | 26 |
| Con | Labour |

== Ward results ==
=== Addiscombe ===
Addiscombe (3)
| Party | Candidate | Votes | % | ±% |
|---|---|---|---|---|
| Labour Co-op | Jeremy P. Fitzpatrick | 1,680 | | |
| Labour Co-op | Martin D. Walker | 1,630 | | |
| Labour Co-op | Nancy T. Irwin | 1,627 | | |
| Conservative | Megan Holt-Thomas | 1,608 | | |
| Conservative | Peter G. Holt-Thomas | 1,581 | | |
| Conservative | Christopher A. Fink | 1,517 | | |
| Liberal | Paul D. Wiggin | 1,277 | | |
| Liberal | Leslie A. Rowe | 1,242 | | |
| Liberal | Susan E. Wiggin | 1,215 | | |
| Majority | | 19 | | |
| Turnout | | | | |
| Registered electors | | | | |
| Labour Co-op gain from Conservative | | Swing | | |
| Labour Co-op gain from Conservative | | Swing | | |
| Labour Co-op gain from Conservative | | Swing | | |

=== Ashburton ===
Ashburton (2)
| Party | Candidate | Votes | % | ±% |
|---|---|---|---|---|
| Conservative | Edwin S. Arram | 1,471 | | |
| Conservative | George A. Holmes | 1,338 | | |
| Labour | Rodney G. D. Matlock | 860 | | |
| Labour | Peter L. Spalding | 814 | | |
| SDP | Richard J. Edwards | 805 | | |
| SDP | Paul F. West | 728 | | |
| Majority | | 478 | | |
| Turnout | | | | |
| Registered electors | | | | |
| Conservative hold | | Swing | | |
| Conservative hold | | Swing | | |

=== Bensham Manor ===
Bensham Manor (3)
| Party | Candidate | Votes | % | ±% |
|---|---|---|---|---|
| Labour | Graham A. Dean | 2,252 | | |
| Labour | Paul R. Mee | 2,058 | | |
| Labour | Hilary A. Key | 2,045 | | |
| Conservative | Steven L. V. Hollands | 1,544 | | |
| Conservative | Ronald J. Bowker | 1,517 | | |
| Conservative | Julia A. Wood | 1,342 | | |
| Liberal | Valerie F. S. Lehec | 740 | | |
| Alliance | Philip V. Pavey | 650 | | |
| Alliance | Nicholas P. Willis | 648 | | |
| Green | Timothy A. J. Rowe | 172 | | |
| Majority | | 501 | | |
| Turnout | | | | |
| Registered electors | | | | |
| Labour gain from Conservative | | Swing | | |
| Labour gain from Conservative | | Swing | | |
| Labour gain from Conservative | | Swing | | |

=== Beulah ===
Beulah (2)
| Party | Candidate | Votes | % | ±% |
|---|---|---|---|---|
| Conservative | Philomena M. Brown | 1,510 | | |
| Conservative | Klemens E. Zdanowicz | 1,447 | | |
| Labour | Martin R. Kender | 787 | | |
| Labour | Joy M. Laing | 720 | | |
| SDP | Julie Armitage | 516 | | |
| Liberal | Trevor J. Barker | 508 | | |
| Majority | | 660 | | |
| Turnout | | | | |
| Registered electors | | | | |
| Conservative hold | | Swing | | |
| Conservative hold | | Swing | | |

=== Broad Green ===
Broad Green (3)
| Party | Candidate | Votes | % | ±% |
|---|---|---|---|---|
| Labour | Christine M. Jarrold | 1,913 | | |
| Labour | Kevin D. Jarrold | 1,895 | | |
| Labour | Hugh P. Atkinson | 1,887 | | |
| Conservative | Geoffrey N. de Bois | 870 | | |
| Conservative | Douglas A. H. Sharman | 801 | | |
| Conservative | Stephen G. Ghero | 792 | | |
| Alliance | Christopher M. Pocock | 524 | | |
| Alliance | Christopher D. Hunt | 513 | | |
| Alliance | Stephen A. Hall | 500 | | |
| Majority | | 1,017 | | |
| Turnout | | | | |
| Registered electors | | | | |
| Labour gain from Conservative | | Swing | | |
| Labour gain from Conservative | | Swing | | |
| Labour gain from Conservative | | Swing | | |

=== Coulsdon East ===
Coulsdon East (3)
| Party | Candidate | Votes | % | ±% |
|---|---|---|---|---|
| Conservative | Michael S. Barber | 2,446 | | |
| Conservative | Stanley E. Littlechild | 2,382 | | |
| Conservative | Andrew J. Pelling | 2,264 | | |
| Liberal | Peter Hasler Billenness | 2,022 | | |
| Liberal | Ian R. Atkins | 2,021 | | |
| Alliance | Hugh Pierce | 1,912 | | |
| Labour | Catherine T. Evans | 345 | | |
| Labour | John F. Treffry | 338 | | |
| Labour | Nuala C. O'Neill | 334 | | |
| Majority | | 242 | | |
| Turnout | | | | |
| Registered electors | | | | |
| Conservative hold | | Swing | | |
| Conservative hold | | Swing | | |
| Conservative hold | | Swing | | |

=== Croham ===
Croham (3)
| Party | Candidate | Votes | % | ±% |
|---|---|---|---|---|
| Conservative | Ian Croft | 2,315 | | |
| Conservative | Peter S. Bowness | 2,225 | | |
| Conservative | John P. B. Hecks | 2,189 | | |
| Liberal | James S. Forrest | 2,117 | | |
| SDP | Christopher G. Peacock | 1,928 | | |
| Alliance | Stephen P. J. Maloney | 1,905 | | |
| Labour | David J. White | 401 | | |
| Labour | Pauline H. Scharp | 399 | | |
| Labour | Claire E. M. Bailey Newton | 372 | | |
| Green | Michael Spencer-Bowdage | 255 | | |
| Majority | | 72 | | |
| Turnout | | | 48.3 | |
| Registered electors | | 10,479 | | |
| Conservative hold | | Swing | | |
| Conservative hold | | Swing | | |
| Conservative hold | | Swing | | |

=== Fairfield ===
Fairfield (3)
| Party | Candidate | Votes | % | ±% |
|---|---|---|---|---|
| Conservative | John L. Aston | 2,521 | | |
| Conservative | Robert W. Coatman | 2,483 | | |
| Conservative | Michael D. Wunn | 2,324 | | |
| SDP | Tyrrell Burgess | 1,004 | | |
| Labour | Stanley L. Eaton | 967 | | |
| Alliance | Philip H. Barron | 952 | | |
| Labour | Richard A. Frost | 933 | | |
| Labour | Vanessa C. Fry | 932 | | |
| Alliance | Norman Harris | 930 | | |
| Majority | | 1,320 | | |
| Turnout | | | | |
| Registered electors | | | | |
| Conservative hold | | Swing | | |
| Conservative hold | | Swing | | |
| Conservative hold | | Swing | | |

=== Fieldway ===
Fieldway (2)
| Party | Candidate | Votes | % | ±% |
|---|---|---|---|---|
| Labour Co-op | James L. Walker | 1,450 | | |
| Labour Co-op | Mary M. Walker | 1,296 | | |
| Conservative | John R. Miller | 416 | | |
| Conservative | Roy T. Miller | 390 | | |
| Alliance | Philip J. Harvey | 222 | | |
| Alliance | Clare V. Boyle | 213 | | |
| Majority | | 880 | | |
| Turnout | | | | |
| Registered electors | | | | |
| Labour Co-op hold | | Swing | | |
| Labour Co-op hold | | Swing | | |

=== Heathfield ===
Heathfield (3)
| Party | Candidate | Votes | % | ±% |
|---|---|---|---|---|
| Conservative | Mary M. H. Horden | 2,416 | | |
| Conservative | Nicholas E. V. Perry | 2,416 | | |
| Conservative | Richard F. Pannett | 2,406 | | |
| Alliance | David A. Partridge | 866 | | |
| Alliance | Ian Dixie | 827 | | |
| Alliance | Frances M. Williams | 806 | | |
| Labour | Thomas F. H. King | 595 | | |
| Labour | Mark Chapman | 574 | | |
| Labour | Owen H. Williams | 537 | | |
| Majority | | 1,540 | | |
| Turnout | | | | |
| Registered electors | | | | |
| Conservative hold | | Swing | | |
| Conservative hold | | Swing | | |
| Conservative hold | | Swing | | |

=== Kenley ===
Kenley (2)
| Party | Candidate | Votes | % | ±% |
|---|---|---|---|---|
| Conservative | Alan K. Carey | 1,478 | | |
| Conservative | Brian G. Smith | 1,363 | | |
| Alliance | Sidney R. H. King | 752 | | |
| Alliance | Robert D. Riddett | 723 | | |
| Labour | Andrew J. Cridford | 289 | | |
| Labour | Lillian L. Scott | 254 | | |
| Majority | | 611 | | |
| Turnout | | | | |
| Registered electors | | | | |
| Conservative hold | | Swing | | |
| Conservative hold | | Swing | | |

=== Monks Orchard ===
Monks Orchard (2)
| Party | Candidate | Votes | % | ±% |
|---|---|---|---|---|
| Conservative | Albert W. Elliott | 1,936 | | |
| Conservative | Derek R. Loughborough | 1,884 | | |
| Labour | David L. Davies | 685 | | |
| Alliance | Anne M. Brown | 665 | | |
| SDP | Julian D. Goldie | 635 | | |
| Labour | Marie E. Henderson | 625 | | |
| Majority | | 1,199 | | |
| Turnout | | | | |
| Registered electors | | | | |
| Conservative hold | | Swing | | |
| Conservative hold | | Swing | | |

=== New Addington ===
New Addington (3)
| Party | Candidate | Votes | % | ±% |
|---|---|---|---|---|
| Labour | Roger M. Burgess | 1,786 | | |
| Labour | Brenda P. Kirby | 1,756 | | |
| Labour | Geraint R. Davies | 1,678 | | |
| Conservative | Alfred J. Doherty | 789 | | |
| Conservative | Brian D. J. O'Shea | 680 | | |
| Conservative | Catherine M. C. Wunn | 650 | | |
| Alliance | Anthony E. W. Gooch | 379 | | |
| Alliance | Katharine A. Finney | 336 | | |
| Alliance | Mahmood I. Bhamji | 284 | | |
| Majority | | 889 | | |
| Turnout | | | | |
| Registered electors | | | | |
| Labour hold | | Swing | | |
| Labour hold | | Swing | | |
| Labour hold | | Swing | | |

=== Norbury ===
Norbury (3)
| Party | Candidate | Votes | % | ±% |
|---|---|---|---|---|
| Conservative | Lindsay R. Hodges | 2,044 | | |
| Conservative | Colin Johnston | 2,037 | | |
| Conservative | Bryan J. Kendall | 2,033 | | |
| Liberal | Pamela E. Freeman | 1,162 | | |
| Liberal | John Fraser | 1,160 | | |
| Labour | Paul J. Murray | 1,134 | | |
| SDP | George M. T. Pirintji | 1,122 | | |
| Labour | Douglas I. Stuart | 1,103 | | |
| Labour | Mary S. Stuart | 1,055 | | |
| Majority | | 871 | | |
| Turnout | | | | |
| Registered electors | | | | |
| Conservative hold | | Swing | | |
| Conservative hold | | Swing | | |
| Conservative hold | | Swing | | |

=== Purley ===
Purley (3)
| Party | Candidate | Votes | % | ±% |
|---|---|---|---|---|
| Conservative | Peter J. F. Macdonald | 2,423 | | |
| Conservative | George A. Smith | 2,404 | | |
| Conservative | David L. Congdon | 2,392 | | |
| Alliance | Sheila Buckle | 1,266 | | |
| Liberal | John Hatherley | 1,118 | | |
| Liberal | Jonathan M. Cardy | 1,084 | | |
| Labour | Geoffrey Bish | 498 | | |
| Labour | Stephen Baister | 493 | | |
| Majority | | 1,126 | | |
| Turnout | | | | |
| Registered electors | | | | |
| Conservative hold | | Swing | | |
| Conservative hold | | Swing | | |
| Conservative hold | | Swing | | |

=== Rylands ===
Rylands (2)
| Party | Candidate | Votes | % | ±% |
|---|---|---|---|---|
| Conservative | Guy L. Harding | 1,175 | | |
| Conservative | Keith Wilson | 1,105 | | |
| Labour | Patrick T. Ryan | 926 | | |
| Labour | Michael J. Anteney | 914 | | |
| SDP | Robin Taylor | 752 | | |
| SDP | Charles L. Bailey | 650 | | |
| Majority | | 179 | | |
| Turnout | | | | |
| Registered electors | | | | |
| Conservative hold | | Swing | | |
| Conservative hold | | Swing | | |

=== Sanderstead ===
Sanderstead (2)
| Party | Candidate | Votes | % | ±% |
|---|---|---|---|---|
| Conservative | Colin J. Hood | 2,178 | | |
| Conservative | Bruce T. H. Marshall | 2,042 | | |
| Alliance | Angela C. Mills | 896 | | |
| Alliance | Raymond W. Bustin | 883 | | |
| Labour | Anthony J. Lear | 352 | | |
| Labour | Rose I. White | 294 | | |
| Green | Edmond M. Rosenthal | 149 | | |
| Majority | | 1,146 | | |
| Turnout | | | | |
| Registered electors | | | | |
| Conservative hold | | Swing | | |
| Conservative hold | | Swing | | |

=== Selsdon ===
Selsdon (2)
| Party | Candidate | Votes | % | ±% |
|---|---|---|---|---|
| Conservative | Dudley S. Mead | 2,154 | | |
| Conservative | Ian L. Aarons | 2,126 | | |
| SDP | Patricia A. Charman | 752 | | |
| Alliance | Philip Ashley | 719 | | |
| Labour | Michael P. J. Phelan | 386 | | |
| Labour | John H. Robinson | 359 | | |
| Majority | | 1,374 | | |
| Turnout | | | | |
| Registered electors | | | | |
| Conservative hold | | Swing | | |
| Conservative hold | | Swing | | |

=== South Norwood ===
South Norwood (3)
| Party | Candidate | Votes | % | ±% |
|---|---|---|---|---|
| Conservative | Beryl Saunders | 1,407 | | |
| Conservative | David Lipman | 1,400 | | |
| Conservative | Paul A. Saunders | 1,379 | | |
| Liberal | Jeremy E. Cope | 1,189 | | |
| Liberal | Pamela M. Whirrity | 1,169 | | |
| Liberal | Anthony R. Phillips | 1,148 | | |
| Labour | Iain K. Forbes | 972 | | |
| Labour | Elaine A. Gibbon | 939 | | |
| Labour | Margaret H. Hardley | 907 | | |
| Majority | | 190 | | |
| Turnout | | | | |
| Registered electors | | | | |
| Conservative hold | | Swing | | |
| Conservative hold | | Swing | | |
| Conservative hold | | Swing | | |

=== Spring Park ===
Spring Park (2)
| Party | Candidate | Votes | % | ±% |
|---|---|---|---|---|
| Conservative | Denis E. Perry | 2,275 | | |
| Conservative | Janet A. Marshall | 2,265 | | |
| Labour | Peter J. Champion | 693 | | |
| Alliance | Christine T. Martin | 651 | | |
| Labour | Stephen C. Moyse | 646 | | |
| Alliance | Robert J. Williams | 622 | | |
| Majority | | 1,572 | | |
| Turnout | | | | |
| Registered electors | | | | |
| Conservative hold | | Swing | | |
| Conservative hold | | Swing | | |

=== Thornton Heath ===
Thornton Heath (3)
| Party | Candidate | Votes | % | ±% |
|---|---|---|---|---|
| Labour | Adrian S. Dennis | 1,871 | | |
| Labour | Wallace W. Garratt | 1,860 | | |
| Labour | Leni Gillman | 1,726 | | |
| Residents | John G. Davies | 1,378 | | |
| Residents | John C. Morgan | 1,332 | | |
| Residents | Phyllis A. Stelling | 1,252 | | |
| Liberal | Peter C. Davies | 644 | | |
| Alliance | Meem Y. Sheen | 534 | | |
| Alliance | Katherine M. Chadderton | 524 | | |
| Majority | | 348 | | |
| Turnout | | | | |
| Registered electors | | | | |
| Labour gain from Residents | | Swing | | |
| Labour gain from Residents | | Swing | | |
| Labour gain from Residents | | Swing | | |

=== Upper Norwood ===
Upper Norwood (2)
| Party | Candidate | Votes | % | ±% |
|---|---|---|---|---|
| Conservative | Margaret C. V. Parfitt | 1,497 | | |
| Conservative | Ernest G. Noad | 1,468 | | |
| Labour | Andrew M. S. Ward | 985 | | |
| Labour | Michael D. Petrou | 953 | | |
| Alliance | David A. Sawyer | 464 | | |
| Alliance | Lawrence West | 453 | | |
| Majority | | 483 | | |
| Turnout | | | | |
| Registered electors | | | | |
| Conservative hold | | Swing | | |
| Conservative hold | | Swing | | |

=== Waddon ===
Waddon (3)
| Party | Candidate | Votes | % | ±% |
|---|---|---|---|---|
| Conservative | James J. Nea | 1,994 | | |
| Conservative | Reginald H. Kent | 1,941 | | |
| Labour | Christopher R. Allen | 1,876 | | |
| Conservative | Beverley S. Winborn | 1,808 | | |
| Labour | Anthony J. Slatcher | 1,776 | | |
| Labour | Andrew C. Theobald | 1,730 | | |
| Liberal | Charles E. Burling | 908 | | |
| Liberal | Joy I.D. Prince | 874 | | |
| Alliance | William N. Tucker | 852 | | |
| National Front | Paul Ballard | 144 | | |
| Majority | | 68 | | |
| Turnout | | | | |
| Registered electors | | | | |
| Conservative hold | | Swing | | |
| Conservative hold | | Swing | | |
| Labour gain from Conservative | | Swing | | |

=== West Thornton ===
West Thornton (3)
| Party | Candidate | Votes | % | ±% |
|---|---|---|---|---|
| Labour | Margaret R. Mansell | 1,954 | | |
| Labour | David R. Evans | 1,932 | | |
| Labour | Gwendolyn E. Bernard | 1,834 | | |
| Conservative | Stephen J. Stewart | 1,386 | | |
| Conservative | Eric W. Howell | 1,357 | | |
| Conservative | Yvonne A. L. Stewart | 1,320 | | |
| Liberal | Janet R. Pitt | 922 | | |
| Alliance | Alan J. Holder | 823 | | |
| Alliance | Graham F. Williams | 763 | | |
| Majority | | 448 | | |
| Turnout | | | | |
| Registered electors | | | | |
| Labour gain from Conservative | | Swing | | |
| Labour gain from Conservative | | Swing | | |
| Labour gain from Conservative | | Swing | | |

=== Whitehorse Manor ===
Whitehorse Manor (3)
| Party | Candidate | Votes | % | ±% |
|---|---|---|---|---|
| Labour | Robert C. E. Brooks | 1,501 | | |
| Labour | Alison J. Roberts | 1,372 | | |
| Labour | Ian Smedley | 1,285 | | |
| Liberal | William H. Pitt | 1,117 | | |
| Conservative | Denis V. Read | 932 | | |
| Conservative | Arthur S. Dwan | 926 | | |
| Conservative | Kathleen M. Brickwood | 920 | | |
| SDP | Geoffrey Morley | 890 | | |
| Liberal | Robert B. Russell | 870 | | |
| National Front | Keith D. Handy | 85 | | |
| Majority | | 168 | | |
| Turnout | | | | |
| Registered electors | | | | |
| Labour gain from Conservative | | Swing | | |
| Labour gain from Conservative | | Swing | | |
| Labour gain from Conservative | | Swing | | |

=== Woodcote & Coulsdon West ===
Woodcote & Coulsdon West (3)
| Party | Candidate | Votes | % | ±% |
|---|---|---|---|---|
| Conservative | Maurice A. Fowler | 2,778 | | |
| Conservative | Samuel J. Moore | 2,750 | | |
| Conservative | Jenefer G. A. Riley | 2,693 | | |
| Alliance | John P. Callen | 1,210 | | |
| Alliance | Keith C. Jacobs | 1,136 | | |
| Alliance | Michael E. Rosenbloom | 1,054 | | |
| Labour | David Denver | 500 | | |
| Labour | Georgina C. Page | 490 | | |
| Labour | Judah L. Scharp | 424 | | |
| Majority | | 1,483 | | |
| Turnout | | | | |
| Registered electors | | | | |
| Conservative hold | | Swing | | |
| Conservative hold | | Swing | | |
| Conservative hold | | Swing | | |

=== Woodside ===
Woodside (2)
| Party | Candidate | Votes | % | ±% |
|---|---|---|---|---|
| Labour | Toni E. Letts | 1,221 | | |
| Labour | Robert P. Trory | 1,142 | | |
| Conservative | Dennis F. Todd | 1,060 | | |
| Conservative | Jack Westbury | 975 | | |
| SDP | Diana M. Landon | 415 | | |
| Liberal | Graem Peters | 367 | | |
| Majority | | 82 | | |
| Turnout | | | | |
| Registered electors | | | | |
| Labour gain from Conservative | | Swing | | |
| Labour gain from Conservative | | Swing | | |
