= Fiona Hill (British political adviser) =

British Conservative political adviser

Fiona Hill CBE
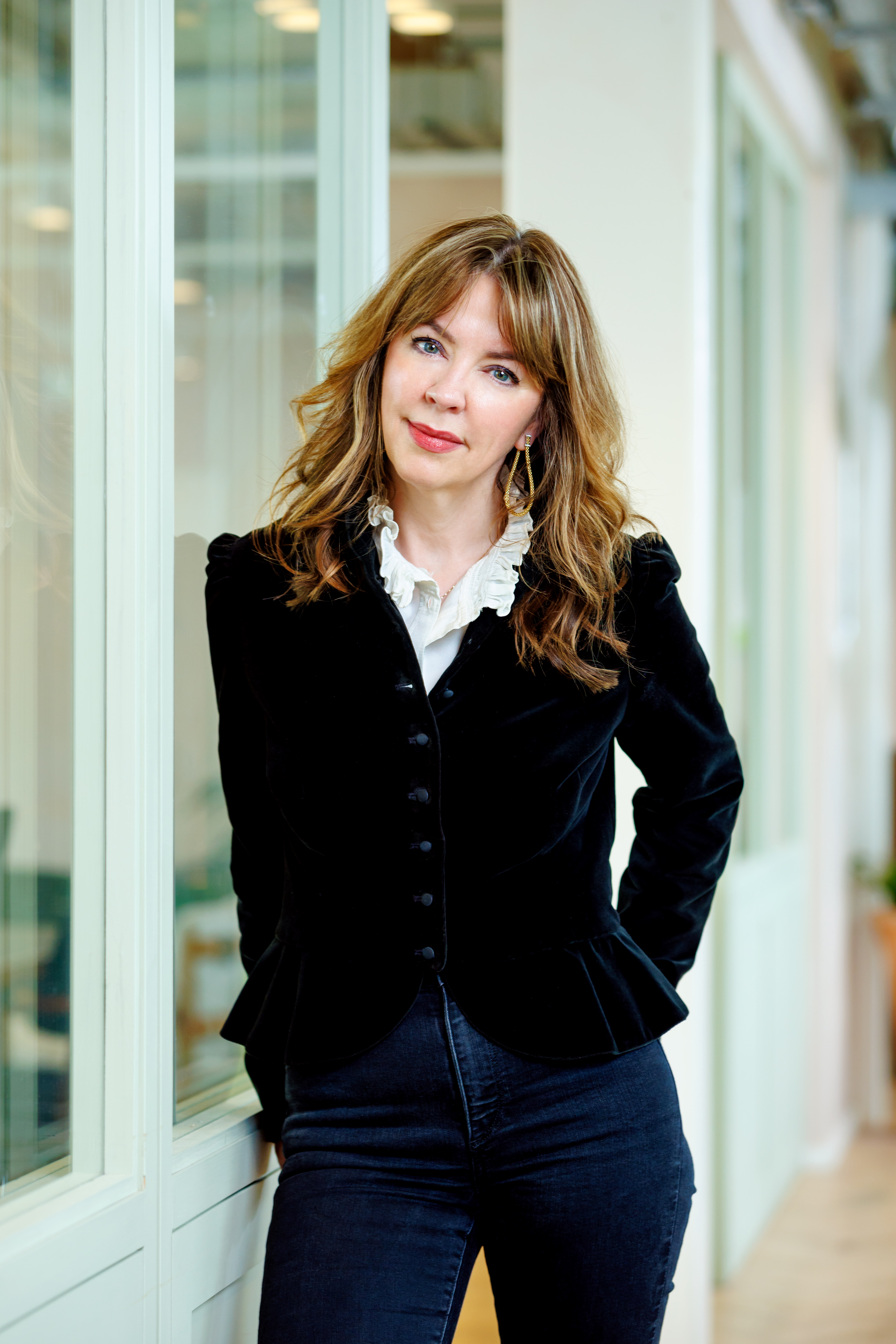

Downing Street Chief of Staff
- In office 14 July 2016 – 9 June 2017 Serving with Nick Timothy
- Prime Minister: Theresa May
- Deputy: Joanna Penn
- Preceded by: Edward Llewellyn
- Succeeded by: Gavin Barwell

Personal details
- Born: 1973 (age 52–53)
- Party: Conservative

Fiona McLeod Hill CBE, formerly known as Fiona Cunningham, is a British political adviser, business strategist, and founder of Future Resilience Forum. She served as Joint Downing Street Chief of Staff supporting prime minister Theresa May, alongside Nick Timothy, until her resignation following the 2017 general election.

== Early life ==
Fiona Hill was born in Glasgow, and attended St Stephen's Roman Catholic Secondary School in Port Glasgow. Before turning to politics, she worked as a journalist in both the press and broadcast sectors; her experience included working for the Daily Record, The Scotsman and Sky News. She joined the Conservative Party press office in 2006, before spending a period at the British Chamber of Commerce, and then returning to work for the Conservatives.

== Career ==
=== Home Office ===
From 2010, Hill worked alongside Theresa May in the Home Office as a special adviser. She left government after being forced to resign as May's special adviser in a 2014 dispute with Michael Gove over alleged extremism in schools, prompting then Prime Minister, David Cameron, to insist that May sack her. Hill then became an associate director of the Centre for Social Justice think tank, and in 2015 became a Director of lobbying firm Lexington Communications.

=== Downing Street ===
On 14 July 2016, following the resolution of the 2016 Conservative leadership election, Hill was appointed joint chief of staff to Theresa May, the day after May became Prime Minister. Fiona Hill was the first female Chief-of-Staff at Downing Street.

Little of her own political stance is on public record. Unlike Timothy, with whom she shared the post of Chief of Staff for a year, she avoided writing opinion articles. James Kirkup, who worked with Hill as a journalist on The Scotsman, suggested "it's probably fair to say that Mrs May only talks about modern slavery [as a priority for government action] because of Ms Hill, and that's not the only issue of which that is true".

Fiona Hill, one of Theresa May's closest advisers, played a pivotal role in the development of May's anti-human trafficking campaign, leading to the introduction of the Modern Slavery Act in 2015. Fiona Hill is also author of A Modern Response to Modern Slavery research in Europe, published at the Centre for Social Justice. Additionally, as noted by May biographer Rosa Prince, author of Theresa May: The Enigmatic Prime Minister, Hill was likely consulted by May before the decision in April to call the election.

The 2017 general election saw the return of the Conservatives as a minority government, with their majority dependent on the Democratic Unionist Party, leading to widespread calls within the party for both Hill and Timothy to be sacked. According to reports, Hill irritated the Scottish Conservatives in particular. They complained of her excessive "interference" and of being told not to run a campaign too detached from the one run from London. Nevertheless, their leader Ruth Davidson chose to ignore the demand, and achieved a considerable increase in the number of Scottish MPs. This result was crucial in mitigating the loss of seats south of the border and appeared to question key elements of Hill and Timothy's election strategy. Within days, and in the face of the growing backlash, both chiefs of staff resigned.

=== Marsham Street Consultants ===
In March 2019, Fiona Hill founded Marsham Street Consultants, a company that offers strategic advice and insights, drawing on Hill's extensive experience in government and politics.

=== Future Resilience Forum ===
In October 2023, Fiona Hill founded Future Resilience Forum, a non-partisan international forum, where the key challenges of our time can be discussed under the Chatham House rule by global experts and international political figures.

The 2023 Future Resilience Forum focused on the Global South and was led at the Old Royal Naval College in Greenwich. The Forum was attended by a range of world leaders, including the UK Prime Minister Rishi Sunak, Senegal's President Macky Sall, Iraq's President Abdul Latif Rashid, former UK Foreign Secretary William Hague, Chairman of the Independent Energy Policy Institute Narendra Taneja, Minister for Digital in Japan Taro Kono, CEO Control Risks Nick Allan and two former heads of MI6, Sir John Scarlett and Sir Alex Younger and many others.

== Personal life ==
While at Sky News Hill met Tim Cunningham, a TV executive, whom she married; the couple later divorced. Hill subsequently lived with Sir Charles Farr, whom she met at the Home Office during his time as Director-General for the Office of Security and Counter-Terrorism. Farr died in 2019.

Government offices
Preceded by Edward Llewellyn	Downing Street Chief of Staff; 2016–2017; With: Nick Timothy	Succeeded by Gavin Barwell
