= Gavin Barwell =

British Conservative politician (born 1972)

The Right Honourable The Lord Barwell PC
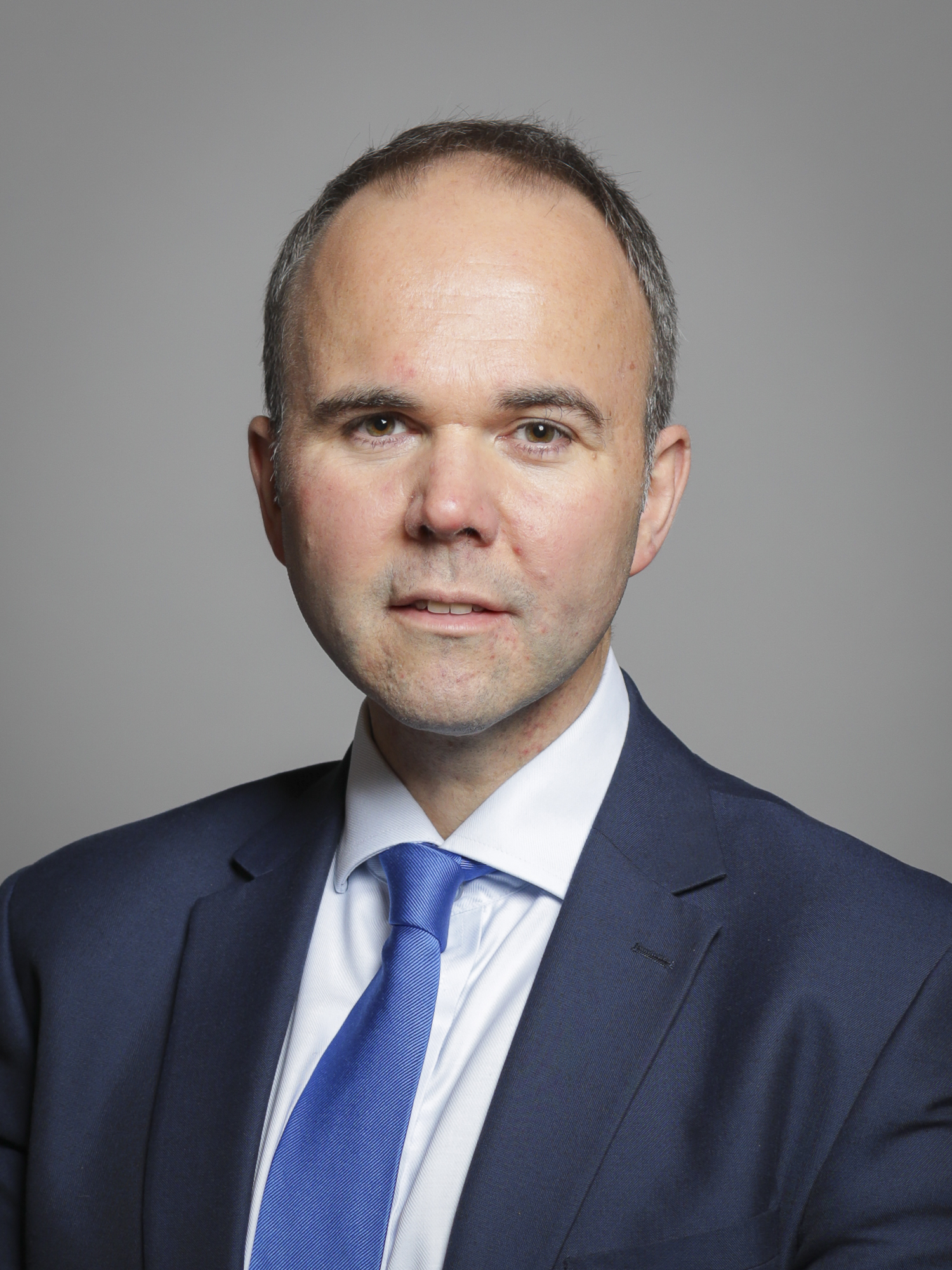
- Official portrait, 2019

Downing Street Chief of Staff
- In office 10 June 2017 – 24 July 2019
- Prime Minister: Theresa May
- Deputy: Joanna Penn
- Preceded by: Fiona Hill; Nick Timothy
- Succeeded by: Edward Lister

Minister of State for Housing and Planning
- In office 17 July 2016 – 9 June 2017
- Prime Minister: Theresa May
- Preceded by: Brandon Lewis
- Succeeded by: Alok Sharma

Minister for London
- In office 17 July 2016 – 9 June 2017
- Prime Minister: Theresa May
- Preceded by: Tessa Jowell (2010)
- Succeeded by: Greg Hands

Comptroller of the Household
- In office 11 May 2015 – 17 July 2016
- Prime Minister: David Cameron
- Preceded by: Don Foster
- Succeeded by: Mel Stride

Lord Commissioner of the Treasury
- In office 15 July 2014 – 11 May 2015
- Prime Minister: David Cameron
- Preceded by: Anne Milton
- Succeeded by: George Hollingbery

Member of the House of Lords
- Lord Temporal
- Life peerage 7 October 2019

Member of Parliament for Croydon Central
- In office 6 May 2010 – 3 May 2017
- Preceded by: Andrew Pelling
- Succeeded by: Sarah Jones

Personal details
- Born: Gavin Laurence Barwell; 23 January 1972 (age 54) Cuckfield, West Sussex, England
- Party: Conservative (whip suspended)
- Spouse: Karen McKenzie (m. 2001)
- Children: 3
- Education: Trinity College, Cambridge (BA)

Gavin Laurence Barwell, Baron Barwell PC (born 23 January 1972) is a British politician and former Downing Street Chief of Staff to Prime Minister Theresa May. A member of the Conservative Party, he was Member of Parliament for Croydon Central from 2010 until 2017, he currently sits as a Non-affiliated peer in the House of Lords, having had the Conservative whip suspended in July 2026.

Barwell worked for the Conservative Party headquarters from 1993 until his election in 2010 and was – between 2003 and 2006 – the party's chief operating officer, sitting on the party board and working closely with the party leaders Michael Howard and David Cameron. He was a councillor in the London Borough of Croydon between 1998 and 2010.

He served as Minister of State for Housing and Planning in the First May ministry.

Barwell was sworn into the Privy Council on 14 June 2017, alongside fellow Conservative minister Mel Stride. Shortly after losing his Parliamentary seat, he was appointed Downing Street Chief of Staff by Theresa May, following the resignations of Fiona Hill and Nick Timothy on 10 June 2017. He was awarded a life peerage in 2019.

== Early life and career ==
Gavin Laurence Barwell was born in January 1972 in Cuckfield, West Sussex, and subsequently moved to Croydon, South London, where he was educated at the Trinity School of John Whitgift. He read for a degree in Natural Sciences at Trinity College, Cambridge, where he was President of the Cambridge Union, and graduated from the University of Cambridge in 1993.

=== Party worker and councillor (1993–2010) ===
After graduating, Barwell was employed by the Conservative Central Office in a number of roles between 1993 and 2010.

He worked at the Conservative Research Department from 1993 to 1995 as a desk officer in the home affairs section responsible for housing, local government, the environment and inner cities. He replaced James Gray as Special Adviser to the Secretary of State for the Environment John Gummer from 1995 to 1997, and was the Head of Local Government from 1998 to 2003. He served as the Chief Operating Officer in the Campaigns Headquarters between 2003 and 2006 before being employed as a "consultant" until 2010.

He worked with Deputy Party Chairman Michael Ashcroft's target seat scheme, and significantly contributed to the Conservatives' 2010 general election plan.

In May 1998, Barwell was elected to Croydon Council representing the Woodcote and Coulsdon West ward. In May 2006, when the Conservatives took control of the council, he was appointed Chief Whip of the Conservative Group and he subsequently served as the Cabinet member for resources and customer services and the Cabinet member for community safety and cohesion before standing down from the Council in May 2010.

== Parliamentary career (2010–2017) ==
=== Backbencher ===
Barwell was chosen as the parliamentary candidate for the Conservative Party in Croydon Central. At the 2010 general election he defeated the sitting Independent MP, Andrew Pelling, who had previously been elected as a Conservative. Barwell gained 39.5% of the vote; his majority was 2,969 votes, the Labour candidate came second. His main subject interests are education, urban policy, policing, the criminal justice system, immigration and asylum rights. He was a member of the House of Commons Science and Technology Select Committee (2010–2012) and the Draft Lords Reform Bill Joint Committee (2011–2012) and, until October 2013, Barwell was Secretary of the All-Party Parliamentary Group for Tamils.

==== Mental Health (Discrimination) (No. 2) Bill (2012–13) ====
On 14 June 2012, Barwell announced that, having come fourth in the Private Members Bill ballot, he would introduce the Mental Health (Discrimination) Bill. The legislation is designed to remove automatic bans from people who have received treatment for mental illness from undertaking jury service, being removed as directors of companies and as MPs.

The Bill was introduced in June 2012 and passed its Second Reading on 14 September 2012, supported by all political parties before passing its committee stage in October 2012 with the full support of all committee members. The Report stage and Third Reading of the Bill passed the Commons on 30 November 2012 before the Bill moved to the House of Lords where it was sponsored by Lord Stevenson of Coddenham. The bill passed its first reading in the Lords on 3 December 2012 and its third reading on 11 February 2013. The Bill became an Act of Parliament after receiving Royal Assent on 28 February 2013.

==== Lillian's Law ====
Lillian's Law is a law-reform campaign named after Lillian Groves, a 14-year-old constituent of Barwell's who was killed outside her home in New Addington in 2010 by a driver who was under the influence of cannabis. He was sentenced to eight months' imprisonment, reduced to four months by entering a plea of guilty at the earliest opportunity.

Barwell successfully lobbied the Prime Minister, David Cameron to introduce legislation to make driving under the influence of drugs a similar offence to driving under the influence of alcohol. Cameron met the Groves family and legislation was included in the 2012 Queen's Speech. The legislation created a new offence under the Crime and Courts Act 2013.

=== PPS and junior minister ===
Barwell was appointed Parliamentary Private Secretary to Greg Clark, Minister for Cities and Decentralisation. In September 2012, he was appointed as Parliamentary Private Secretary to Michael Gove, the Secretary of State for Education. On 7 October 2013 the Prime Minister David Cameron appointed Barwell to the position of Assistant Government Whip. On 15 July 2014, Cameron promoted Barwell to the position of Government Whip, Lord Commissioner.

At the 2015 election, Barwell retained his seat with a majority of just 165. Barwell's book, How to Win a Marginal Seat: My Year Fighting for my Political Life, was published in March 2016. At the 2017 general election held just 15 months later, Barwell lost his marginal seat.

He was Minister of State for Housing and Planning and Minister for London from July 2016 to June 2017.

=== Deletion of material from Wikipedia ===
In December 2014, the local paper The Croydon Advertiser called on Barwell to "stop launching campaigns" and "persistent attempts at headline-grabbing" saying "Gavin, we get it, there's an election on."

The page on Wikipedia was one of a number edited ahead of the 2015 general election by computers inside parliament; an act which The Daily Telegraph said "appears to be a deliberate attempt to hide embarrassing information from the electorate".

=== Allegations of electoral fraud ===
In May 2016, a member of the public complained to the Metropolitan Police Service over possible electoral fraud in Barwell's 2015 election campaign. The claims relate to the number of leaflets Barwell delivered in his constituency, as undelivered election material does not fall under the election spending limit.

Barwell denied the claims, saying he followed 'proper process' when filing the election expenses. Barwell was found in a separate investigation to be in breach of the Code of Conduct by Kathryn Hudson, the Parliamentary Commissioner for Standards. However, the Police investigation concluded in October 2016 that there was no case to answer.

=== Fire safety at Grenfell ===
In the run up to the Grenfell disaster, Barwell was contacted seven times by the Fire Safety and Rescue All-Party Parliamentary Group (APPG), chaired by David Amess MP. Their warnings of the potentially deadly consequences of Class 0 fire rated materials had gone largely unanswered, with the last letter being sent 26 days ahead of the tower fire. At a similar time, a letter of concern about the use of these materials in residential buildings, particularly blocks of flats, was issued by the London Fire Brigade Commissioner, which had also gone unanswered. In June 2021, Barwell was invited to give evidence at the Grenfell Tower Inquiry along with 4 other MPs.

=== 2017 defeat ===
In the snap general election of 2017, Barwell lost his seat to Labour's Sarah Jones by 5,652 votes. When he lost his seat he was awarded a "loss of office" (redundancy) grant of £8,802 in line with his age and length of parliamentary service. He returned the full amount to IPSA upon his appointment as Downing Street chief of staff. In December 2018 it was announced that he would not be the Conservative candidate in the next election in Croydon Central.

== Downing Street Chief of staff (2017–2019) ==
On 10 June 2017, Theresa May appointed Barwell Downing Street Chief of Staff. Following the Grenfell Tower fire of 14 June 2017, he was criticised by The Independent for adding to delays in publishing a report into fire safety which followed the 2009 Lakanal House fire. The day following the fire, he walked past journalists but refused to answer any questions.

Following the departure of Theresa May as Prime Minister in July 2019, Barwell stepped down as Chief of Staff and was replaced by Dominic Cummings and Sir Edward Lister.

In November 2020 Atlantic Books acquired the rights to Barwell's book, Chief of Staff: My Time as the Prime Minister's Right-Hand Man, that was published in September 2021.

== House of Lords ==
Barwell was nominated for a life peerage in Theresa May's Resignation Honours List in September 2019. He was created Baron Barwell, of Croydon in the London Borough of Croydon, on 7 October 2019.

Having initially been a Conservative peer, since 13 October 2025, he has been a non-affiliated peer. In July 2026, the leader of the Conservative Party, Kemi Badenoch, confirmed that she would not restore the Conservative whip to him.

== Personal life ==
Barwell married Karen McKenzie in 2001. His wife, a speech and language therapist, previously worked at Applegarth School in New Addington. The couple have three sons. He had cancer as a child.

== Honours ==
- He was sworn in as a member of Her Majesty's Most Honourable Privy Council on 14 June 2017 at Buckingham Palace. This gave him the honorific title "The Right Honourable" and after Ennoblement the post nominal letters "PC" for life.

Parliament of the United Kingdom
Preceded by Andrew Pelling	Member of Parliament for Croydon Central; 2010–2017	Succeeded by Sarah Jones
Political offices
Preceded by Don Foster	Comptroller of the Household; 2015–2016	Succeeded by Mel Stride
Preceded by Brandon Lewis	Minister of State for Housing and Planning; 2016–2017	Succeeded by Alok Sharma
Preceded by Tessa Jowell	Minister for London; 2016–2017	Succeeded by Greg Hands
Government offices
Preceded by Fiona Hill and Nick Timothy	Downing Street Chief of Staff; 2017–2019	Succeeded by Edward Lister
Orders of precedence in the United Kingdom
Preceded by The Lord Anderson of Ipswich	Gentlemen; Baron Barwell	Followed by The Lord Parkinson of Whitley Bay
