= Peter Bowness, Baron Bowness =

British politician (born 1943)

The Right Honourable The Lord Bowness CBE DL
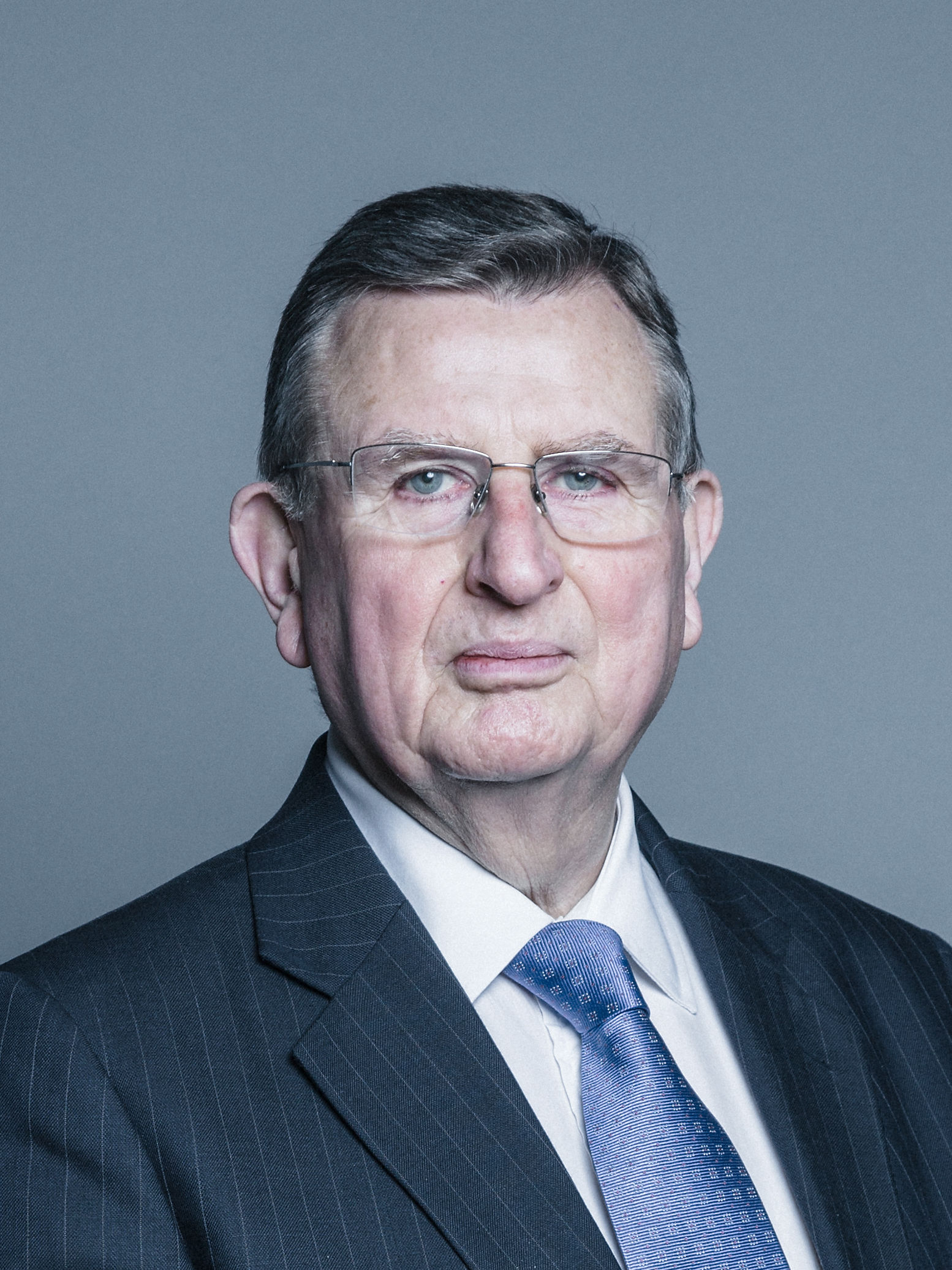

Member of the House of Lords
- Lord Temporal
- Life peerage 17 January 1996

Leader of Croydon London Borough Council
- In office 1980–1994

Mayor of Croydon
- In office 1979–1980

Leader of Croydon London Borough Council
- In office 1976–1979

Member of Croydon London Borough Council
- In office 1968–1998

Personal details
- Born: Peter Spencer Bowness; 19 May 1943 (age 83)
- Party: Conservative (1996–2020); Non-affiliated (2020–2021); Crossbench (2021–present)
- Education: Whitgift School
- Alma mater: University of Law
- Awards: Deputy Lieutenant (1981); CBE (1981); Knight Bachelor (1987); Life peer (1996)

Peter Spencer Bowness, Baron Bowness, CBE, DL (born 19 May 1943) is a British politician, solicitor, and life peer. Since 1996, he has been a member of the House of Lords.

== Early life ==
Bowness was born on 19 May 1943. He was educated at Whitgift School, an all-boys private school in South Croydon, London. He graduated from the University of Law, and began work as a solicitor in 1966.

== Legal career ==
Bowness is a qualified solicitor and notary public. From 1970 to 2002, he was a partner at Weightman Sadler Solicitors in Purley, London Borough of Croydon. From 2002 to 2011, he was a consultant to Streeter Marshall Solicitors (the successor to the now merged Weightman Sadler Solicitors). Since then, he has not practised as a solicitor or notary public.

== Political career ==
=== Councillor ===
Bowness became a councillor and soon rose within Conservative Party ranks, becoming Leader of Croydon Council, London's largest borough. During the 1980s, Bowness was said to have been one of Margaret Thatcher's favourite Council leaders, and took part in the abolition of the GLC. He was unusual amongst his Conservative colleagues, however, for supporting Ken Livingstone's low-cost public transport initiative, Fares Fair.

He continued as Leader until 1994 when the Labour Party won the local elections. He stepped down from the Council in 1998. He served as a member of the Committee of the Regions and the Audit Commission.

=== House of Lords ===
On 17 January 1996, Bowness was created a life peer as Baron Bowness, of Warlingham in the County of Surrey and of Croydon in the London Borough of Croydon. From December 2002 to November 2006, he was member of the Parliamentary Joint Committee on Human Rights. From December 2003 to May 2014, he served on the European Union Committee. He chaired the Foreign Policy Defence and Developmental Aid Sub-Committee of the EU Select Committee from 2003 to 2006, and chaired the Justice, Institutions and Consumer Protection Sub-Committee from 2009 to 2013. Having originally sat as a Conservative, Lord Bowness left the party to become a non-affiliated peer on 23 November 2020, before becoming a crossbencher on 1 December 2021.

=== OSCE ===
Lord Bowness has been a member of the British delegation to the Parliamentary Assembly of the Organization for Security and Co-operation in Europe (OSCE) since 2007. He was elected a Vice President of the Parliamentary Assembly in 2015 and re-elected in 2018, serving until 2020. In December of that year, Bowness—as the most senior Vice President—acceded to the presidency following the departure of Gigi Tsereteli, and served as President of the Parliamentary Assembly until July 2021.

== Personal life ==
Bowness is a patron of the Warehouse Theatre and was formerly a Governor of the Whitgift Foundation.

== Honours ==
On 14 June 1981, Bowness was appointed a Deputy Lieutenant (DL) to the Lord Lieutenant of Greater London. In the 1981 Birthday Honours, he was appointed a Commander of the Order of the British Empire (CBE) in recognition of his service as Chairman of the London Boroughs Association.

In the 1987 New Year Honours, it was announced that he was to be made a Knight Bachelor "for political and public service". On 11 February 1987, he was knighted by Queen Elizabeth II during a ceremony at Buckingham Palace.

In 1987, Bowness was made Freeman of the City of London. In 2002, he was made an Honorary Freeman of the London Borough of Croydon.

On 1 May 1988, Bowness was appointed Honorary Colonel of the 151 (Greater London) Transport Regiment, Royal Corps of Transport (Volunteers), Territorial Army. On 5 April 1993, he stood down from the appointment and was granted permission to retain his honorary rank.

== Arms ==
Coat of arms of Peter Bowness, Baron Bowness
Crest A demi bull Argent armed and unguled and holding in the mouth a sword point downwards in bend Or. Escutcheon Argent four pallets Sable over all within a cross flory nowy round pierced and parted a roundel Or. Supporters Two daschunds regardant the dexter Sable the sinister Tenne each holding in the mouth a daffodil slipped and leaved Or. Motto N'Esperdre Ja Mes (Never Despair) Badge Within a Cross Flory nowy round pierced and parted a Roundel Or

Orders of precedence in the United Kingdom
Preceded by The Lord Harris of Peckham	Gentlemen; Baron Bowness	Followed by The Lord Thomas of Gresford
