= Queen's Gardens, Croydon =

Public garden in Croydon, South London, England

Coordinates: 51.3718°N 0.0978°W

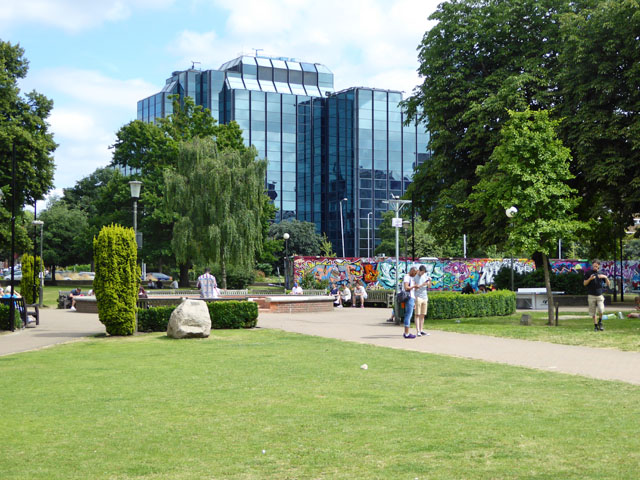
The gardens in 2016

The Queen's Gardens is a public garden in the centre of Croydon, South London. The gardens are bordered by Croydon Town Hall, Bernard Weatherill House, the site of the former Taberner House, Park Lane and Katharine Street.

== History ==
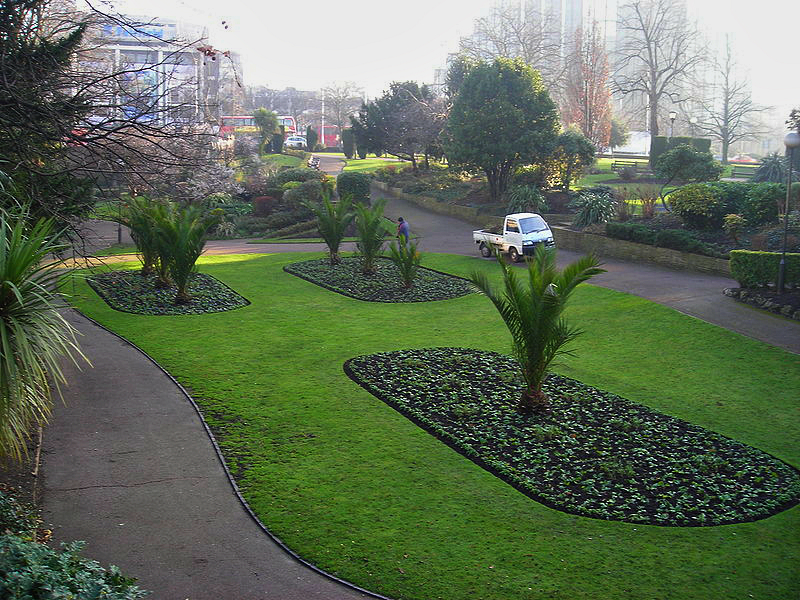
Queen's Gardens in 2007

In their present form, and under their present name, the gardens and their central fountain were opened by Queen Elizabeth II in 1983. The area had previously consisted of the smaller Town Hall Gardens, and the site of Croydon's police station. The Town Hall Gardens had originally been laid out in the 1890s on the site of the disused spur railway line leading to Croydon Central station.

The gardens now comprise areas of lawn with standard trees, a central fountain with benches, and a sunken garden area with formal flower beds and trees exploiting the former track bed and station wall complete with original railings on top. Situated just across from Croydon's register office, the gardens are popular for wedding photographs. A subway exits the park under Park Lane into an underground car park and across to the Fairfield Halls: the gardens are regularly used as a route between the Council offices and the underpass.

The cancelled Park Place development featured proposals to radically alter the Queen's Gardens, with a more formal and modern planting style, an ice rink, space for performances and entrance into the Park Place shopping centre. The gardens remain part of the Croydon Vision 2020 regeneration plan.

After Taberner House was demolished in 2014–2015, the former site was redeveloped, with completion expected in late 2021. The new housing created extended into the Queen's Gardens itself, and there was some concern that the former urban ornamental park had effectively been absorbed into the new project for the use of the residents.

== Gallery ==
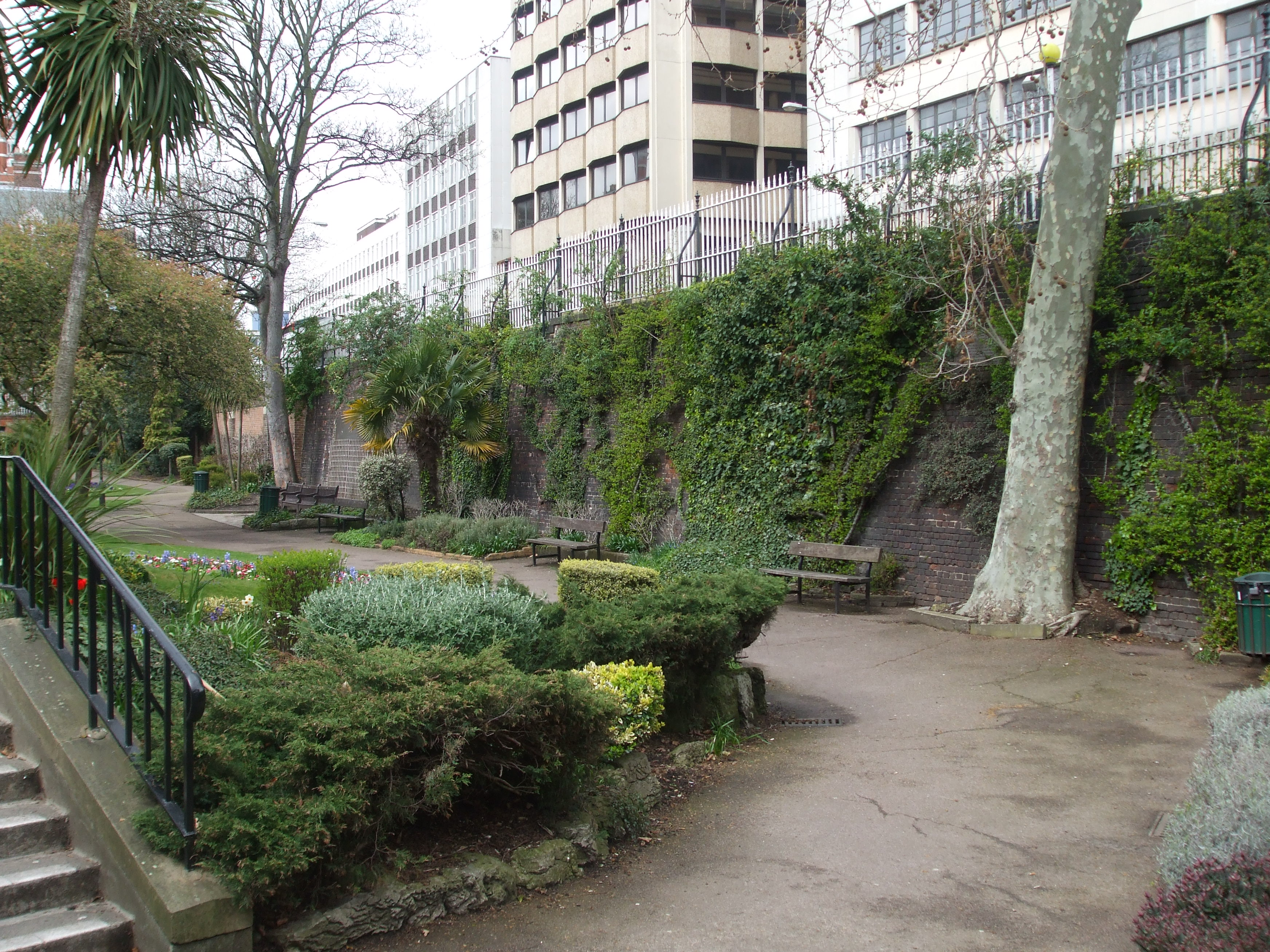
The retaining wall in the cutting east of Central Croydon Station, now part of Queen's Gardens

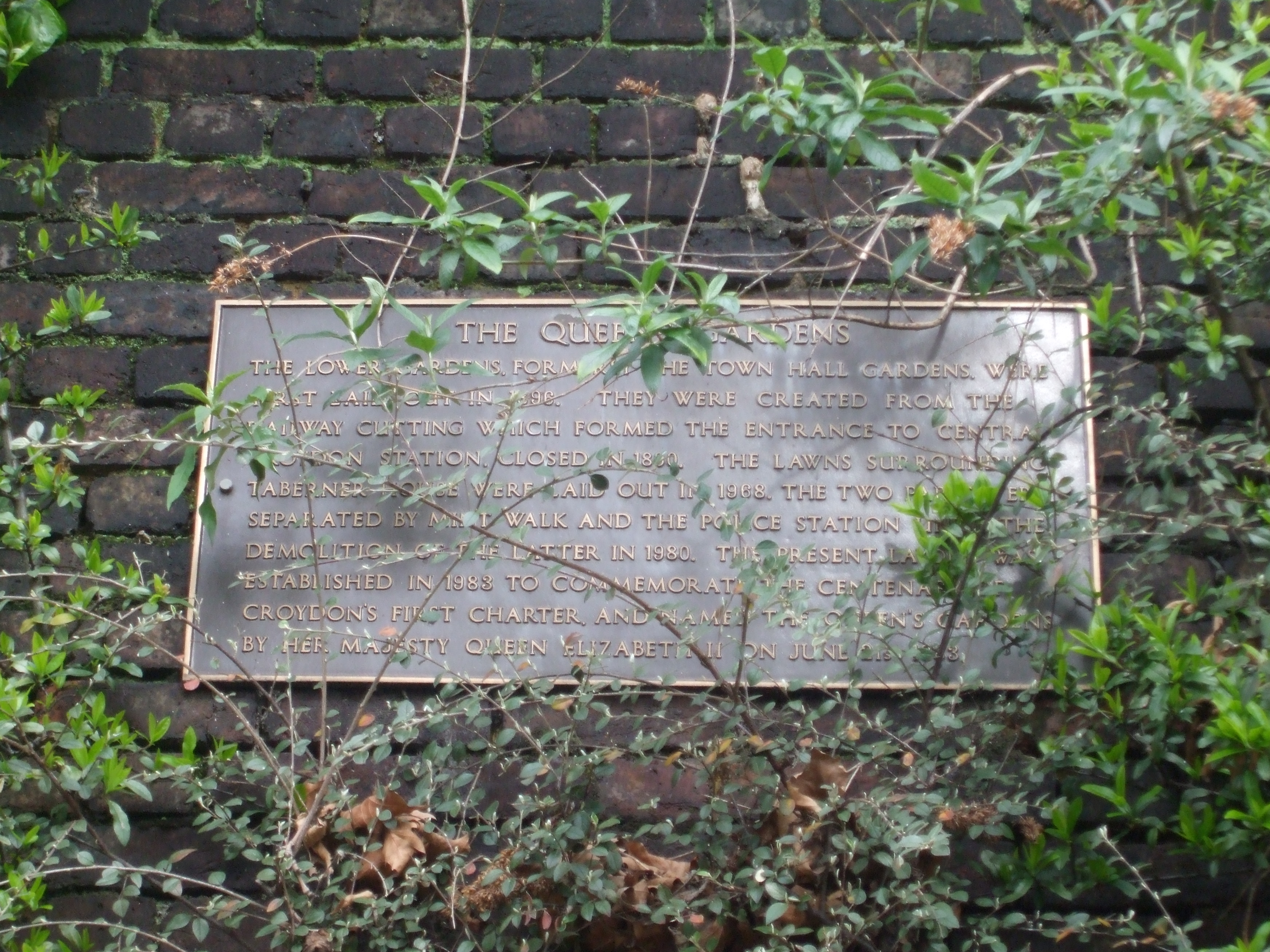
Plaque on retaining wall commemorating the Station's history

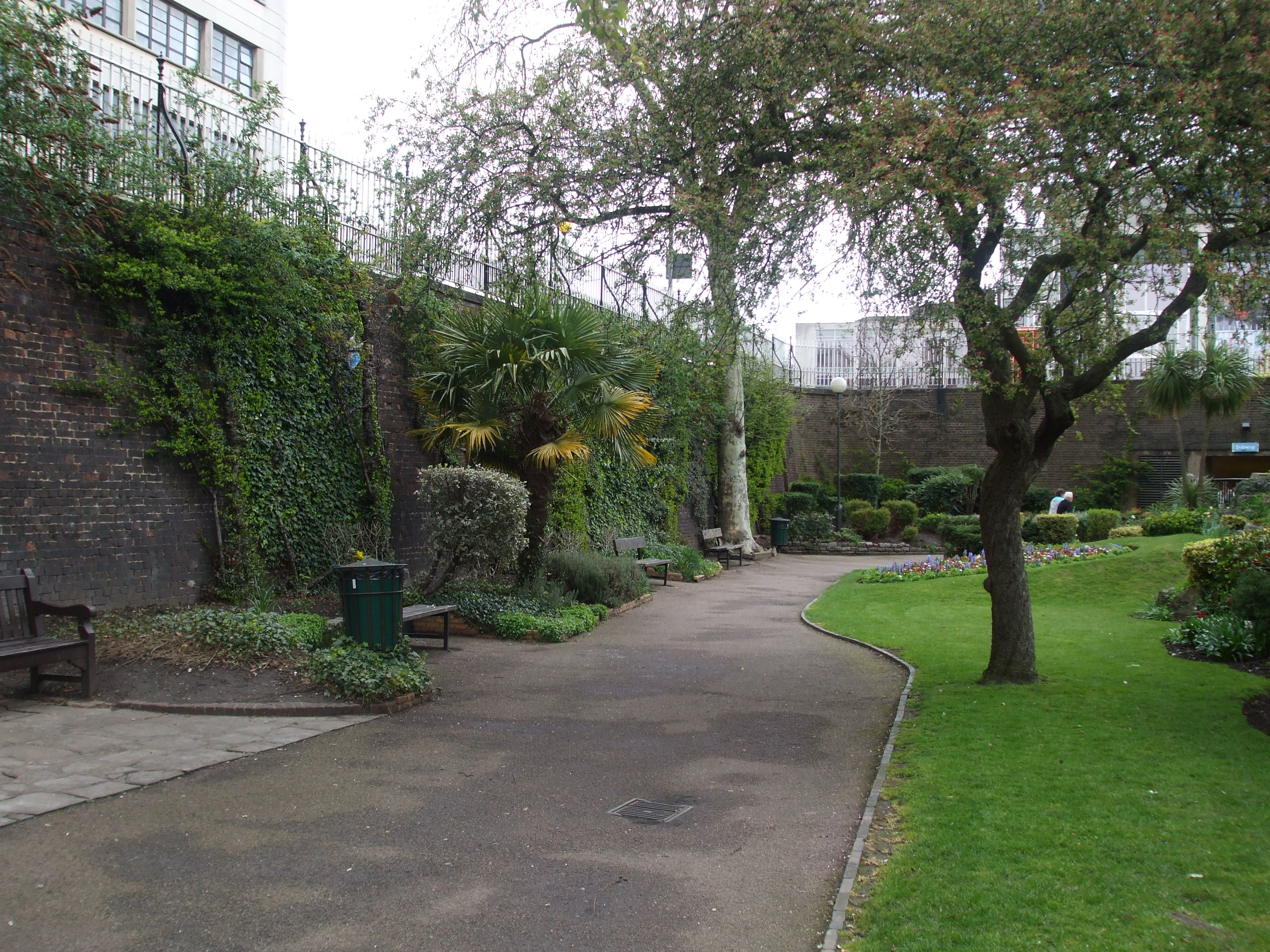
The retaining wall viewed eastwards towards Fairfield Halls

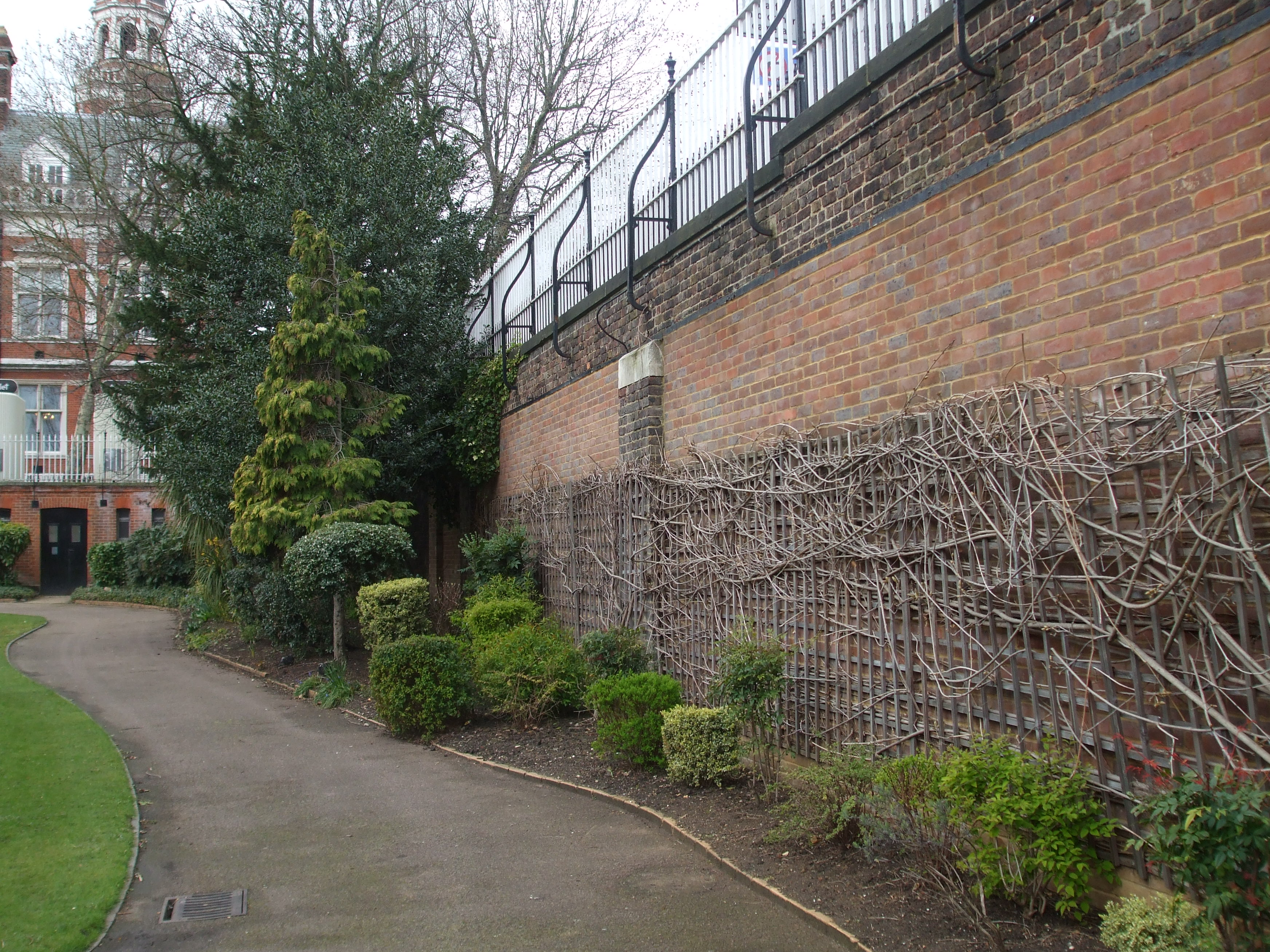
Close-up of the retaining wall

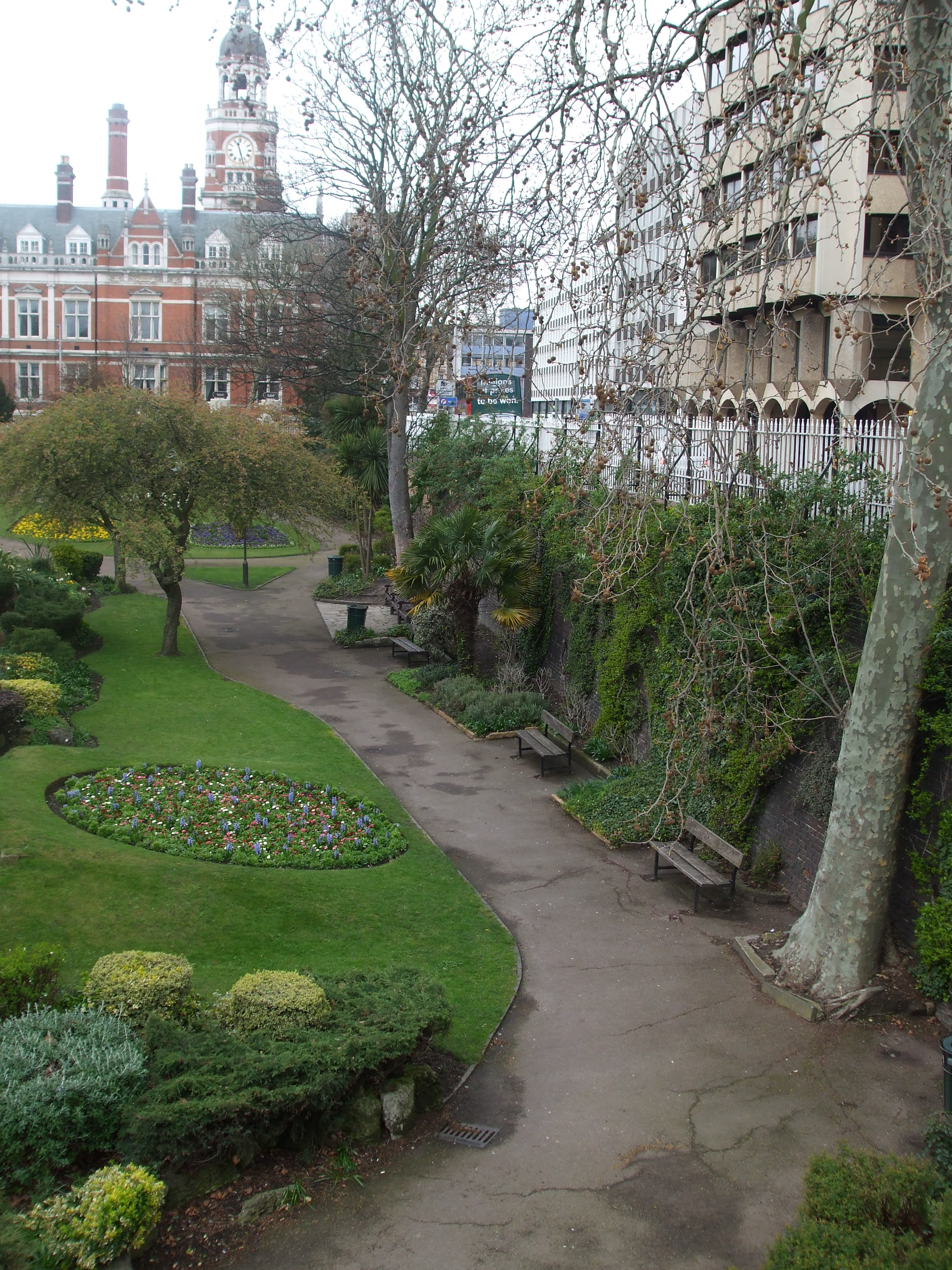
The retaining wall viewed westwards towards the Town Hall

== See also ==
- List of Parks and Open Spaces in Croydon
- Croydon parks and open spaces
