= Portland House =

Skyscraper in London, England

Coordinates: 51°29′51.3″N 00°8′30.1″W

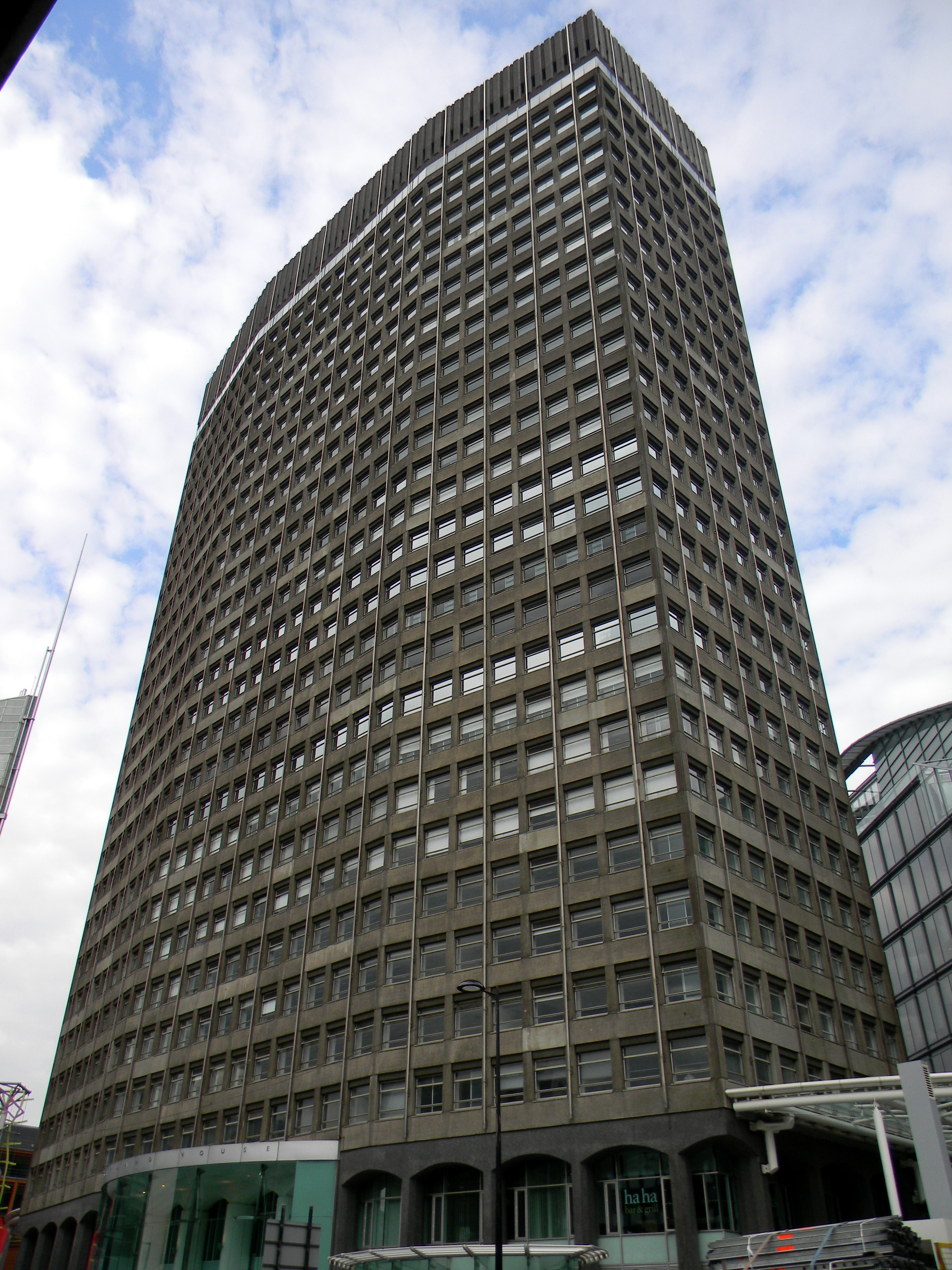
Portland House, Central London

Portland House is a skyscraper in Westminster, London. It is 101 metres (331 ft) tall with 29 floors. The building was the central feature of the redevelopment of the six-acre (2.5-hectare) old Watney's Brewery site. The architects were Howard, Fairbairn & Partners, and the development took place from 1959 to 1963. Pevsner notes that the architectural form of Portland House was influenced by the Pirelli Tower (1955–58) in Milan by architect Gio Ponti. The development was known as Stag Place. Today the site is Cardinal Place.

The building has two banks of lifts — the first serving the first up to the fifteenth floor, and the second the fifteenth floor upwards.

When first opened, Blue Circle Industries occupied floors 16–29, as well as the ground floor. Other firms that have at one point occupied Portland House for office space include American Express, Crossrail, HomeAway UK, Owners Direct, Direct Ferries Orbus Software, Increase the Wedge, NetBooster, Somo Global, TradeDoubler, Wunder2, uSwitch, Upmystreet.com, Reef Television, Rentokil Initial, AkzoNobel, Monica Vinader and IWG. The building also once contained the head offices of British United Airways.

The building is a five-minute walk from London Victoria station (rail and tube) and a ten-minute walk from Victoria Coach Station. The surrounding area was redeveloped between 2003 and 2005, with a new shopping and refreshments area called Cardinal Place. The building also has a gym in the basement.

The building is part of the Cardinal Place Estate, which includes the shopping centre and development around the building. Retail establishments such as Marks & Spencer, Boots, Thorntons, Zara, Ha Ha Bar and Zizzi have taken retail space in the complex.

The ground floor has a portico arrangement of pillars which reflect the octagonal cross-section of the building.

The Portland House is substantially similar in design to the MetLife Building in New York City. The two buildings were under construction at the same time.

As of June 2021, the building is entirely vacant, with the ground floor behind hoardings, pending renovation by Land Securities.

There is another building called Portland House in London, located on 4 Great Portland Street, W1W 8QJ, Central London

== See also ==
- Tall buildings in London
- Pirelli Tower (1958)
- MetLife Building for contemporaneous design tradition

== Sources ==
- Bradley, Simon and Pevsner, Nikolaus (2003). The Buildings of England: London 6: Westminster. New Haven and London: Yale University Press Books. ISBN 0300095953.
