= Central Croydon =

Central Croydon may refer to:

- The centre of Croydon, south London
- Central Croydon railway station, defunct station in Croydon
- Croydon Central (UK Parliament constituency)
