= Direct Ferries =

Travel service based in England

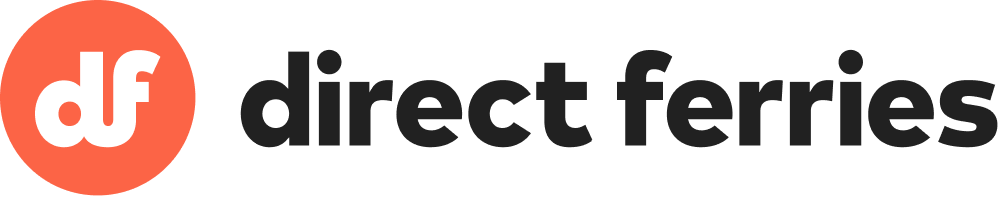
- Type: Limited Company
- Industry: Travel
- Founded: 1999
- Founder: Howard Davies
- Headquarters: London, England, United Kingdom
- Key people: Niall Walsh (CEO)
- Services: Ferry Travel Aggregator Service
- Website: www.directferries.com

Direct Ferries is a UK based ferry travel aggregator service that provides bookings for ferry crossings across the globe. Its main crossings include mainland Europe, such as the France, Ireland, the Netherlands, Spain, Italy and Germany; North Africa, such as Morocco and Algeria; Asia, such as China, Russia, Cambodia and Hong Kong; and the Americas, such as the United States, Canada, Peru and the Dominican Republic.

== History ==
Founded in 1999, Direct Ferries was launched by founder Howard Davies, and quickly expanded to serve multiple markets across the globe.

In 2016, the business received investment from private equity firm Livingbridge, and has since reported major growth worldwide.

Direct Ferries was the first European company to work with NFC (National Ferries Company) in the Sultanate of Oman, and was also the first European company to work with major ferry operators in the US.

In 2017, Direct Ferries launched a dedicated website for both the US and the Middle East, further expanding their marketing capabilities.

== Operations ==
Direct Ferries is a U.K. based company, and has its headquarters based in London, England, where the majority of its employees are based. The company is very internationally focussed though, with their services being offered being spread across the globe, with multiple websites based across the many different languages and countries that they serve.

Direct Ferries’ website works as a third party ticketing service that allows users to compare many different ferry routes, ports and operators. They allow access to practically any port in both Europe and North Africa, as well as many different ports in North America, Asia, and the South Pacific. They also allow you to compare prices between 220 different ferry operators, on routes that allow cars on board, as well as foot passenger only routes. The possibility to change a booked ticked is not implemented for the most ferry companies.

They offer around 3011 ferry routes across the world, covering 725 ferry ports in over 194 countries and separate islands.

The Direct Ferries App was launched in 2013 for both iOS, and for Android, offering access to ferry bookings on the go.

== Criticism ==
Over the years, examples of problematic practices related to customer concerns have repeatedly come to light. During 2018 there was an increasing number of cases of credit card debits for ferries for which no ticket or booking confirmation was available, the European Consumer Centres Network issued a guidance for affected customers.
