= Thomas Lucas (educator) =

British educator of the blind

- Born: Thomas Mark Lucas c. 1764; Bristol, England
- Died: 18 May 1838 (aged 73); London, England
- Occupations: merchant, shorthand teacher, and educator of the blind
- Known for: Lucas system of tactile alphabet for the blind

Thomas Mark Lucas (c. 1764 – 18 May 1838) was a British educator of the blind, founder of the Royal London Society for Blind People, and developer of the Lucas tactile alphabet system, an alternative to the Braille system of reading for the blind.

== Early life ==
Thomas Mark Lucas was born in Bristol around 1764. Little is known of his early life or family, except that he received a pocket Bible from his father at a young age and "remained a man of deep religious conviction throughout his life".

By the early 1800s, Lucas was living at Castle Street, Bristol, and was employed as a merchant and teacher of shorthand, an abbreviated symbolic writing method that increases speed and brevity of writing. It was around this time that Lucas became interested in teaching the blind to read and he soon came up with the solution of using simple shorthand characters which could be felt as well as seen.

== Lucas system ==
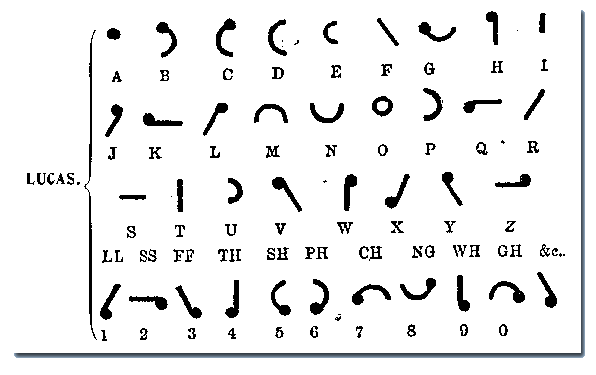
Lucas Type, a British tactile alphabet system introduced by Thomas Lucas in 1838 and used to teach blind people, especially children, to read

Around 1830–1832, Lucas developed his so-called Lucas system (or Lucas type), a form of embossed text or tactile alphabet system using a sort of "stenographic shorthand" with arbitrarily chosen symbols; some strokes had a dot on the end and others did not. (Note: It is worth noting various dates between 1830 and 1838 are given for when the Lucas system was introduced, none of which cite primary sources: P.V. Mills' 1965 British Journal of Ophthalmology article says Lucas developed the system "by 1832"; The story of RLSB founder Thomas Lucas says the system was in use by February 1836 when 16 prominent Bristolians formed The Bristol Society for Embossing and Circulating the Authorised Version of the Bible for the use of the Blind; A History of Blind Welfare in England and Wales published by the National Institute for the Blind in 1939 says Lucas founded his school for the blind in 1830 but does not say if Lucas taught the Lucas system at the school in the same year; and finally the New York Institute for Special Education webpage on History of Writing Codes for the Blind suggests his system was introduced in 1838 but given Lucas's Instructions for the Blind to read with the Britannic or Universal Alphabet, which describes the Lucas system was published in 1837, this seems unlikely. As such, I have chosen the National Institute for the Blind 1939 pamphlet and the 1965 British Journal of Ophthalmology journal article as the most reliable sources.)

The Lucas system signs for different characters appeared simple in outline but in practice could be confusing as similar signs were used in many positions. Consequently, it was not widely used. The Lucas system was one of the first shorthand systems for the blind to be invented and was in use before Braille had been introduced to the UK.

Sometime between 1830 and 1832, Lucas set up a small, free school for blind children at Old Market Street, Bristol, where he taught shorthand and English grammar to blind children. In February 1836, 16 prominent Bristolians including Lucas formed The Bristol Society for Embossing and Circulating the Authorised Version of the Bible for the use of the Blind, to provide funds to print a portion of the Bible using the Lucas system.

In 1837, Lucas published Instructions for Teaching the Blind to Read with the Britannic or Universal Alphabet, and Embossing their Lessons &c to assist in the promotion and wider use of his system, which he also referred to as the Britannic or Universal Alphabet. Lucas also delivered public lectures to promote his system wherein his blind pupils would demonstrate their reading ability.

Lucas aspired to a single, universal and standardised system of teaching the blind to read "by feel", but by the 1830s and 1840s multiple systems were in use including his own. In order to publicise his system further, in 1838 Lucas travelled from Bristol to London to demonstrate his system and the successes of his pupils. This led to the foundation of the London Society for Teaching the Blind to Read, later the Royal London Society for Blind People (RLSB). Here, 31 pupils received instruction in reading and writing using the Lucas system. Lucas died on 18 May 1838, shortly after coming to London.

== Legacy ==
The Lucas system continued to be used after his death and there are two surviving examples of Lucas system books in the Royal National Institute of Blind People collections, The Gospel According to Saint John (1837) and Mother's Last Words (1868). The latter was published after Lucas's death.

Between 1838 and the 1860s the Lucas system was developed for foreign languages and music, and secular and religious works in the Lucas system were distributed throughout Britain and the British empire as well as in India and China. All of the nearly twenty surviving publications in the Lucas system held by major UK libraries are religious texts or instructions on how to teach and use the Lucas system. One of the last books published in the Lucas system was Fifty Anecdotes on Various Subjects. In T. M. Lucas's Embossed Stenographic Characters, by Reverend J. W. Gowring and embossed by blind pupils at the London Society for Teaching the Blind to Read, published in 1867. A rare – perhaps the only surviving – example of embossing apparatus used for the Lucas system is held by the Science Museum, London.

In 1871, the Lucas system was still in use in seven institutions for the blind, whereas Braille was only used in four; it was not until 1891 that the Royal London Society for Blind People discontinued the production of materials which used the Lucas system although they had ceased to teach the system in 1861. By the 1890s, the Braille system had become the standard form of "reading by feel" for the blind.

== Publications ==
- T.M. Lucas, Instructions for Teaching the Blind to Read with the Britannic or Universal Alphabet, and Embossing their Lessons &c (Bristol: Philip Rose and Son, 1837)
