= Taberner House =

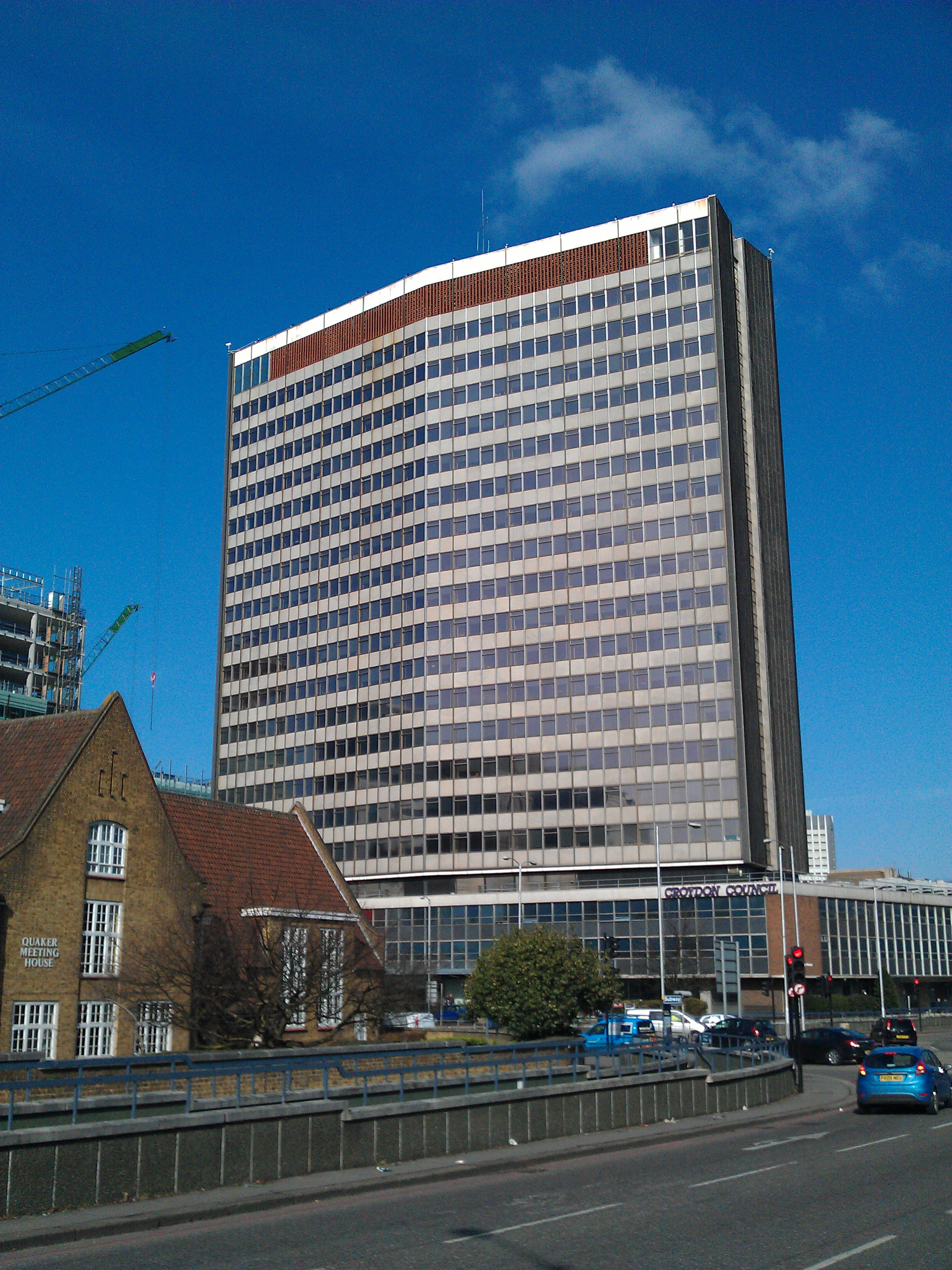
- Taberner House

- Location within London Borough of Croydon

General information
- Location: Croydon, London
- Coordinates: 51.3714°N 0.0977°W
- Inaugurated: 1967
- Owner: Croydon London Borough Council

Design and construction
- Architect: H. Thornley

Taberner House housed many of the offices of Croydon London Borough Council until September 2013; the building was demolished in 2015. It was located in Croydon, London, close to the Croydon Town Hall.

== History ==
Taberner House, which was designed by architect H. Thornley, with Allan Holt as borough engineer and Hugh Lea as the borough architect, was built between 1964 and 1967. Although the Croydon Corporation had needed extra space to supplement Croydon Town Hall since the 1920s, it was only with the imminent creation of the London Borough of Croydon that action was taken. It had its upper slab block narrowing towards both ends. It was named after Ernest Taberner OBE, Town Clerk from 1937 to 1963.

Taberner House accommodated most of the council's central employees, and its 'one-stop shop' was the main location for the public to access information and services. In September 2013 Croydon Council moved their main departments into a new Public Services Delivery Hub (PSDH) at Bernard Weatherill House.

In April 2014, demolition of Taberner House was underway. By 2015, the demolition was complete and Croydon Council had announced a revised residential scheme to lessen the impact on adjoining green spaces and to provide more affordable housing. Construction of a 500-home development began in May 2018 and completion was expected in 2021. In June 2021, it was reported that the first part of the project would be completed in August and the development as a whole, including the adjacent Queen's Gardens, would be finished in the autumn.

In September 2015, the site was temporarily planted with crocus as a link with the origins of the town's name. Plants were later made available to community gardens within the borough.
