= Fairfield Halls =

Concert hall in Croydon, United Kingdom

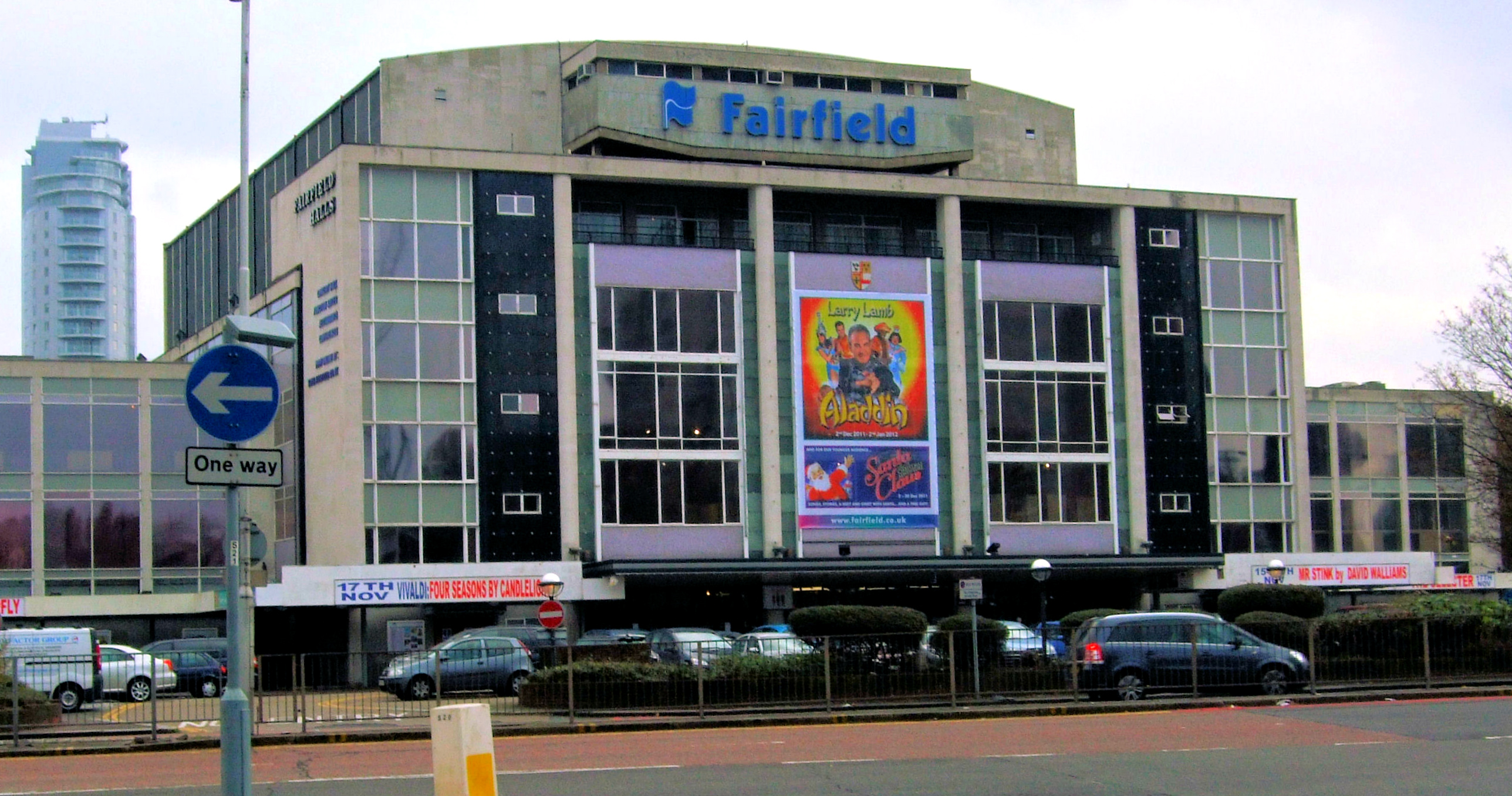
- Fairfield Halls as seen from Queen's Gardens

- Location within London Borough of Croydon

General information
- Type: Concert hall
- Architectural style: Modernist
- Location: Park Lane, Croydon CR9 1DG, United Kingdom
- Coordinates: 51°22′20″N 0°5′45″W
- Inaugurated: 2 November 1962; 63 years ago
- Client: County Borough of Croydon

Design and construction
- Architects: Robert Atkinson and Partners

Fairfield Halls is an arts, entertainment and conference centre in Croydon, London, England, which opened in 1962 and contains a theatre and gallery, and a large concert hall regularly used for BBC television, radio and orchestral recordings. Fairfield Halls closed for a £30 million redevelopment in 2016, and reopened in 2019.

== History ==
The halls are built on the site of Croydon's historic "Fair Field", which hosted a well-known fair up until around 1860, and above disused railway cuttings which used to link the main London to Brighton railway to Croydon Central Station in what is now Queen's Gardens. Between 1930 and 1962 the land was home to both a car park and air raid shelters during the war.

The venue was 50 years old in 2012 and an anniversary concert by the London Mozart Players was attended by the Earl of Wessex. A website was also launched to celebrate both the venue's history and to act as an ongoing archive, containing 2,000 digitised images accessed via text and keyword searches. This makes it one of the largest digitised venue archives in Europe.

In the summer of 2014 the council paid for the refurbishment of the Arnhem Gallery, the conversion of the former Green Room into the New Studio and the installation of modern digital projection equipment with Dolby Surround 7.1 in the Concert Hall.

Fairfield was run from 1993 to 2016 by a self-financing charity with a board of trustees. The charity was in receipt of an operating grant from Croydon Council; it was placed into administration in July 2016.

=== 2016 redevelopment ===
Croydon Council, the freeholder of the land, had various plans to refurbish Fairfield over the years but none of these plans came to fruition. In the spring of 2015 a new set of consultants led by Croydon firm Mott MacDonald was appointed by Croydon Council to deliver a £12m programme on the Fairfield Halls and a separate programme for the remainder of the College Green site. Around £30m would be spent on redeveloping and modernising Fairfield Halls in the period between 2016 and 2018.

In February 2016, it was confirmed that the venue would close for two years for redevelopment starting July 2016 as part of the Croydon council's plan for the cultural and educational quarter in the town centre, with new homes, offices, shops and a building for Croydon College being constructed. The opening was postponed a few times. The cost of the project increased substantially and not all parts of the project were completed. It reopened on 16 September 2019 for six months, but closed again due to the Covid pandemic until 2021.

In 2021, Fairfield Halls was used as a mass vaccination centre as part of the COVID-19 vaccination in the United Kingdom.

== Resident companies ==
London Mozart Players have been the venue’s orchestra in residence since 1989.

Chineke! and the Royal Philharmonic Orchestra are orchestras-in-partnership.

As part of the building's re-opening in 2019 Talawa Theatre Company relocated to the building, taking up a 200-seat theatre space and offices. SAVVY theatre became a resident company around the same time but closed in 2024.

== As a venue ==
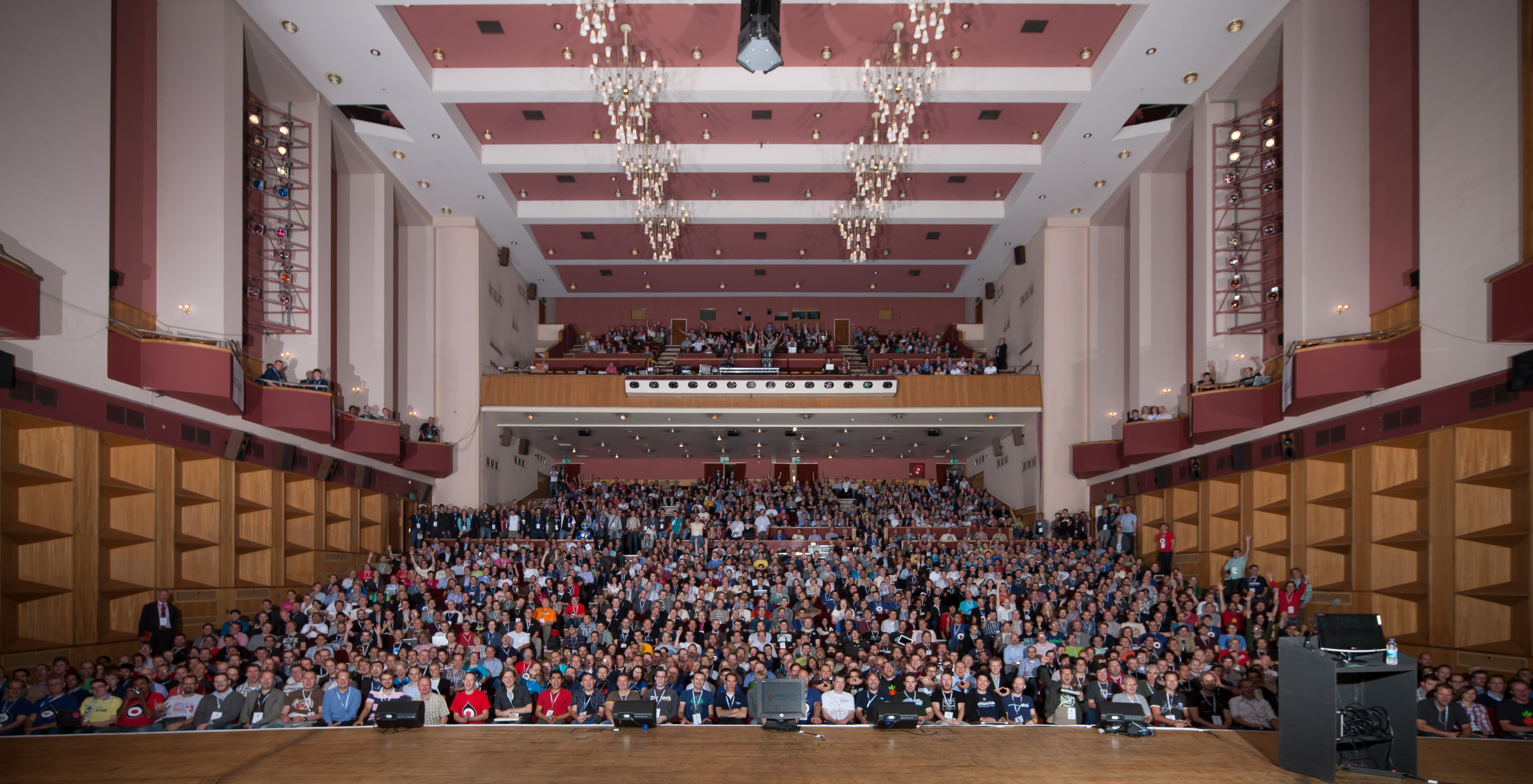
The concert hall in 2011

The building's concert hall has 1,801 seats (counting the choir stalls), the Ashcroft Theatre has 755, and the Arnhem Gallery is used for standing concerts of up to 400.

Many famous acts have performed at the Fairfield Halls, including David Bowie, Kraftwerk, Elton John, John Mayall's Bluesbreakers, the Beatles, Pink Floyd, Stevie Wonder, the Who, Queen, Sister Sledge, Morrissey, Status Quo, Free, Genesis, Petula Clark, Mott the Hoople, Wishbone Ash, The Stranglers and Shane Filan of Westlife. Delaney & Bonnie & Friends recorded their live album On Tour with Eric Clapton in the halls, with a band that also featured George Harrison.

The Nice recorded most of their album Five Bridges live at the concert hall on 17 February 1969, with King Crimson as their opening act for the concert. Soft Machine recorded the major part of "Facelift", the opening track of their album "Third", live at the Fairfield Halls on 4 January 1970. Family performed there in July 1970 and recorded their concert, eventually releasing recordings of three previously unavailable songs and a non-album single from that concert on their November 1970 album Anyway. Free recorded part of their album Free Live! at the venue on 13 September 1970. Rat Scabies and Captain Sensible of the Damned both worked as toilet cleaners at Fairfield Halls, Captain Sensible remarking that he was inspired to take music more seriously after witnessing a T. Rex concert there. Sensible referenced his employment at the venue in his song "Croydon". Morecambe and Wise's appearance at the halls in 1973 was filmed, the only time that their live stage act was recorded. In March 1980, the halls hosted the inaugural concert of the Salvation Army's International Staff Songsters.

Fairfield Halls was also used for British professional wrestling for many years, with various cards having been featured on ITV's World of Sport in the 1970s and 1980s and the second season (1987-1988) of the later standalone "Wrestling" show. In particular All Star Wrestling treated the venue as a showcase location for major cards from 1985 to the mid 2010s. A pilot episode of World of Sport Wrestling was filmed there in 2013. The stage was mechanically lowered to floor level especially for wrestling shows with extra ringside seating places on the stage around three sides of the ring. This was stored in the corridors leading to the front row entrances when the venue was not in wrestling mode. Fairfield has featured as a location in many films, TV productions and commercials. It was featured in the opening titles of the BBC sitcom Terry and June.

Fairfield Halls is also notable for being the venue where Tangerine Dream, on 23 October 1975, recorded a significant portion of Part 2 of their live/studio album Ricochet.

== In cinema ==
Fairfield's concert hall appeared briefly in the film The Da Vinci Code as the location of Robert Langdon's speech to students. The venue also featured in the films Made in Dagenham and Cuban Fury.
