= Royal London Society for Blind People =

The Royal London Society for Blind People (RLSB) was a UK charity that existed for 175 years to help blind and partially sighted young people in London and the South East through a blend of sports, education, and creative and developmental services.

On 1 January 2017, the Royal Society for Blind Children (RSBC) and Royal London Society for Blind People (RLSB) joined to create a charity in England & Wales under the name of the Royal Society for Blind Children.

== History ==
On 12 January 1838, Thomas Lucas established The London Society for Teaching the Blind to Read in the city of London, where he introduced his Lucas Type, an early form of embossed text.

Funds for the school were raised largely through the efforts of the Ladies' Committee under the secretaryship of Mrs Lydia Johnson. Her husband, Percival Norton Johnson, founder of what is now Johnson Matthey plc, also took a prominent role in the affairs of the Society for many years.

Over the years the school slowly expanded, moving to locations across London, before heading to Aylesbury during World War II and eventually Seal in Kent. A college and nursery were later established to allow RLSB to reach out to more young people.

To help vision impaired people gain employment, RLSB also ran a home workers scheme and workshops through the 1900s to allow people to learn a trade and find work.

RLSB continued evolved and expanded to meet new needs of vision impaired young people. Supporters and donors have included the Royal family, playwright J. B. Priestley and Charlie Chaplin.

On 1 January 2017, the Royal Society for Blind Children (RSBC) and Royal London Society for Blind People (RLSB) joined to create a charity in England & Wales under the name of the Royal Society for Blind Children.

=== Timeline ===
The original day school opened in Fitzroy Street, London, on 12 January 1839. In 1840, it moved to a larger premises in 6 Gloucester Place, where resident pupils were accepted. In 1842, the organisation moved to larger premises in Bloomsbury; in 1847, a purpose-built school in Swiss Cottage was completed at a cost of £4,500.

In 1938, the RLSB's 100th anniversary year, the prefix 'Royal' was added to the Society's title by order of HM King George VI; it became the 'Royal London Society for Teaching the Blind to Read'.

At the start of World War II, the children were evacuated from London to a large manor house in Buckinghamshire called 'Dorton House'.

In 1954, the Society purchased 'Wildernesse' in Seal and it became the new permanent home of the School. The name 'Dorton House' was transferred to the new property and the school was officially opened in 1956. The RLSB's purpose-built Dorton House School was opened by the Duchess of Gloucester in 1983. Costing £1.75 million to build, it was designed for the education of 140 pupils.

In 1989, the Queen opened Dorton's College of Further Education; in 1996, a purpose-built nursery was opened. In 2009, Hollybank Farm was officially opened by the Duchess of Gloucester at Dorton House Campus in Seal. In 2010, Tom Pey joined the RLSB as their chief executive officer.

== Dorton College ==
RLSB conducts an education initiative called Learning and Living with Dorton, which allows young people to continue their education in a semi-independent living environment, accessing a post 16 curriculum in a nearby mainstream college, augmented with specialist support. Students live in one of RLSB's community houses in London and the south-east.

RLSB partners with local further education colleges to support students to access a wider range of courses, combined with elements of RLSB's JIGSAW Curriculum (a skills for independent living curriculum) in their community living setting.

== RLSB Connections ==
RLSB runs a network for blind and partially sighted young people called RLSB Connections, through which they can access a range of opportunities.

Working across all London Boroughs, RLSB provides support people who are blind or partially sighted find employment. The organisation also works with employed people who have concerns over their deteriorating eyesight, helping them continue to work in an effective manner, as well as identifying employment opportunities for clients and provide training and support services to help employers better meet the needs of their blind and partially sighted employees and customers.

RLSB maintains a programme called Sport Without Limits, intended to give visually impaired young people aged 8–25 the chance to experience a range of sporting activities including cricket, football, tennis, goalball, athletics, judo and even rock climbing. The programme features activity days that take place across London, Kent and Sussex.

RLSB also works with teachers and teaching assistants in mainstream education, attempting to equip them with the skills they need to work with blind and visually impaired young people

== See also ==
- Royal National Institute of Blind People
- Royal National College for the Blind
