= Cardinal Place =

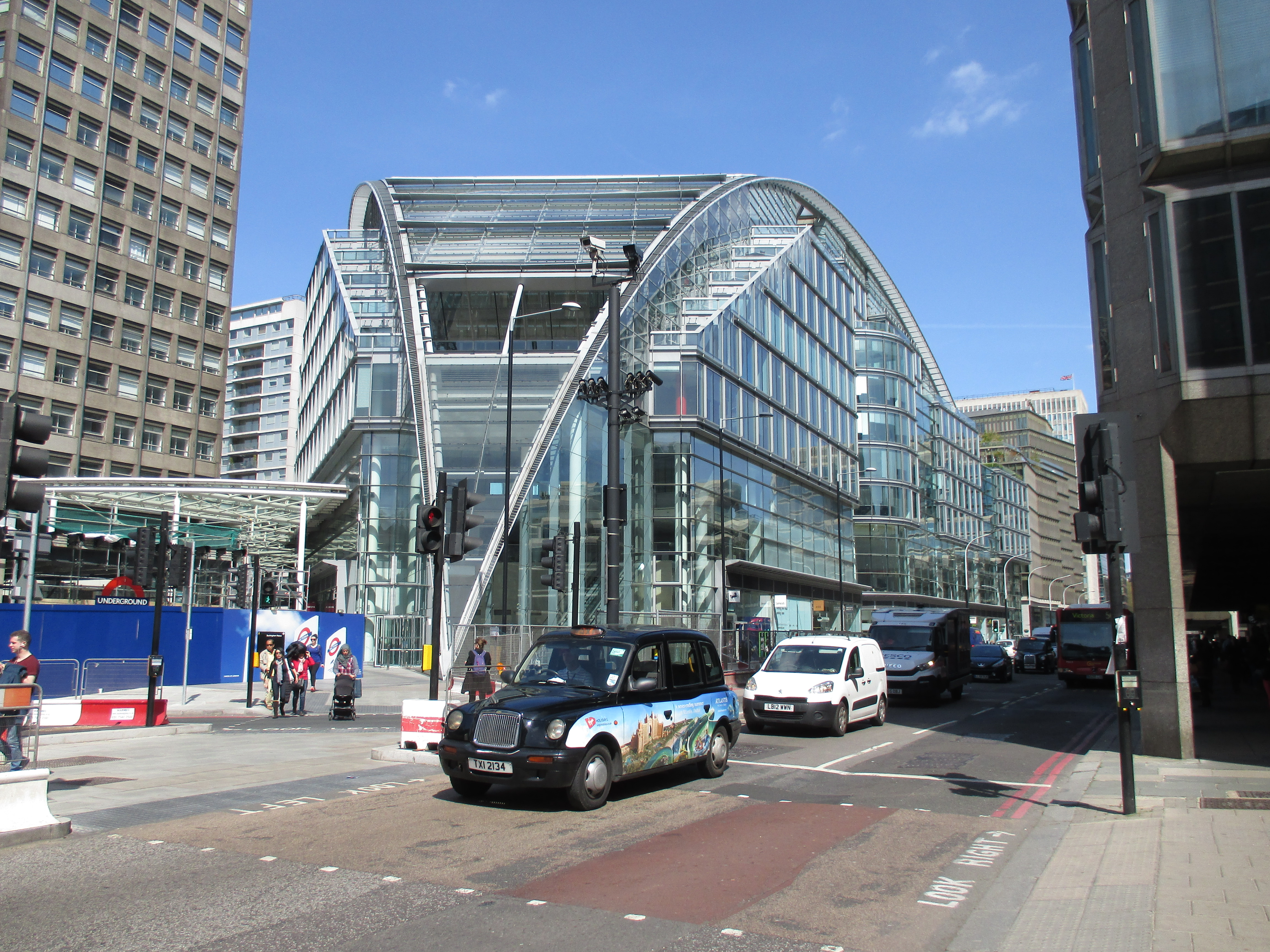
- Cardinal Place, Building One Victoria Street

- Location within Central London

General information
- Status: Completed
- Type: Shopping centre and Offices
- Location: Victoria Street, Victoria, London, United Kingdom
- Coordinates: 51°29′49″N 0°08′26″W
- Completed: 2005
- Cost: £200,000,000
- Owner: Land Securities

Height
- Roof: 45m

Technical details
- Floor count: 11
- Floor area: 650,000 square feet (60,000 m^{2})

Design and construction
- Architecture firm: EPR Architects
- Main contractor: Sir Robert McAlpine

Website
- createvictoria.com

References
- ,

Cardinal Place is a retail and office development in Westminster, near Victoria Station and opposite Westminster Cathedral. The site consists of three buildings covering over a million square feet on Victoria Street next door to Portland House, and was designed by EPR Architects and built by Sir Robert McAlpine. It was developed by Land Securities and includes their headquarters at 100 Victoria Street.

The topping out ceremony was held in December 2004, and performed by Cardinal Cormac Murphy-O'Connor, Lord McAlpine, and Ian J. Henderson, outgoing chief executive of Land Securities.

The £200m development was built directly over the District & Circle line Underground tunnels which actually pass through the basement. The buildings rest on rubber shock absorbers to prevent vibrations from the passing trains. The project includes 550,000 square feet (51,000 m^{2}) of office space and 100,000 square feet (9,300 m^{2}) of retail.
