= Bernard Weatherill House =

Office building in Croydon, London

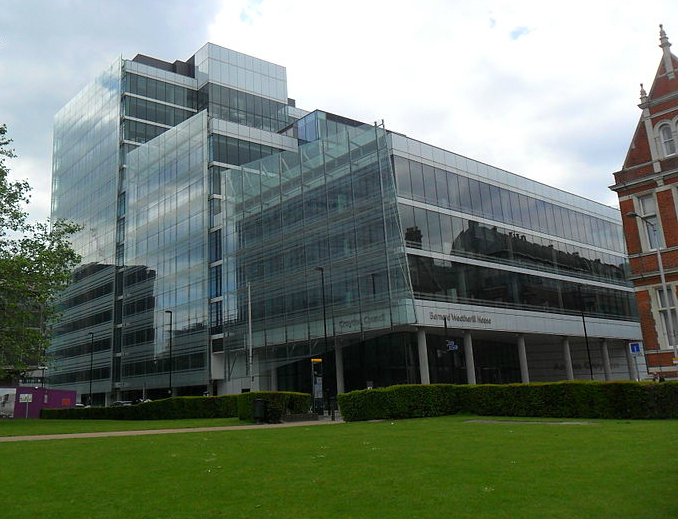
- Bernard Weatherill House

- Location within London Borough of Croydon

General information
- Location: Croydon, London
- Coordinates: 51.3713°N 0.0988°W
- Inaugurated: 2013
- Cost: £107 million

Design and construction
- Architect: EPR Architects
- Main contractor: AELTC

Bernard Weatherill House is a municipal facility in Croydon, London. The building, which is located just south of Croydon Town Hall, provides accommodation for many of the offices of Croydon London Borough Council.

== History ==
The building was commissioned by Croydon London Borough Council to replace the aging Taberner House. The new building, which was designed by EPR Architects and built by AELTC at a cost of £107 million, was completed in May 2013. Croydon Council established a new Public Services Delivery Hub (PSDH) within the new building in September 2013. The new building, named Bernard Weatherill House after Bernard Weatherill, the late former local MP and Speaker of the House of Commons, is 12 storeys in its highest section.
