= Croydon London Borough Council =

Municipal body governing London Borough

- Coat of arms

- Council logo

Type
- Type: London borough council of the London Borough of Croydon
- Houses: Unicameral

History
- Founded: 1 April 1965
- Preceded by: Croydon Borough Council and Coulsdon and Purley Urban District Council

Leadership
- Civic Mayor: Mohammed Islam, Labour since 27 May 2026
- Executive Mayor: Jason Perry, Conservative since 9 May 2022
- Chief Executive (interim): Elaine Jackson since 17 October 2025

Structure
- Seats: 70 councillors plus elected mayor
- Political groups: Administration (29) Conservative (29) (Note: 28 Councillors + directly elected mayor.) Opposition parties (42) Labour (30) Green (8) Liberal Democrat (2) Reform UK (2)
- Committees: Committees (9): Appointments & Disciplinary; Audit & Governance; Civic Mayoralty & Honorary Freedom Selection; Ethics; General Purposes; Licensing; Pension; Planning; Scrutiny & Overview; Boards (2): Health & Wellbeing; Pension; Other Bodies (non-statutory) (17): Adoption Panel; Adult Social Services Review Panel; Corporate Parenting Panel; Croydon Adult Social Services Users' Panel; Croydon Arnhem Working Group; Cycle Forum; Fostering Panel; Housing Disability Panel; Members' Learning & Development Panel; Mobility Forum; Public Transport Liaison Panel; Safer Neighbourhood Board; Schools Forum; Sheltered Housing Panel; Staff Partnership Panel; Standing Advisory Council for Religious Education; Tenant & Leaseholder Panel
- Joint committees: (4): Bandon Hill Cemetery; Croydon & Lewisham Street Lighting; South London Partnership; South London Waste Partnership
- Length of term: Whole council elected every four years

Elections
- Voting system: Plurality at-large (FPTP)
- Last election: 7 May 2026
- Next election: 2 May 2030

Motto
- Ad Summa Nitamur; Let us strive after Perfection

Meeting place
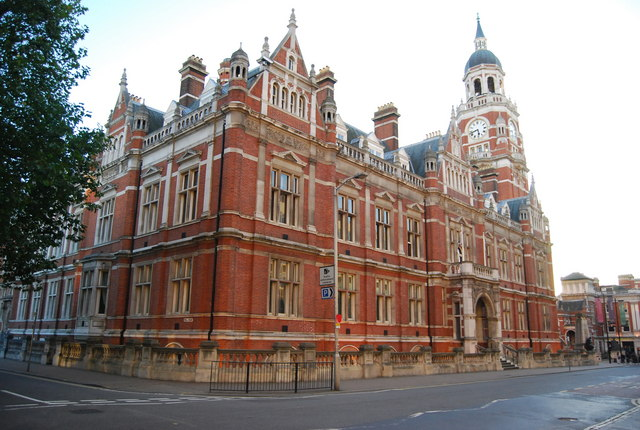
- Town Hall, Katherine Street, Croydon, CR0 1NX

Website
- www.croydon.gov.uk

Constitution
- Constitution of the London Borough of Croydon

Croydon London Borough Council, known as Croydon Council, is the local authority for the London Borough of Croydon in Greater London, England. The council is responsible for the provision of a range of services within the borough. Croydon is divided into 28 wards, electing 70 councillors. Since 2022 the council has been led by a directly elected mayor. The council has been under no overall control since 2022, being run by a Conservative minority administration. The council meets at Croydon Town Hall and has its main offices in the adjoining Bernard Weatherill House.

== History ==
The town of Croydon's first local authority was a body of improvement commissioners established in 1829. They were superseded in 1849 by an elected local board. The town was incorporated as a municipal borough in 1883, after which it was governed by a body formally called the "Mayor, Aldermen and Burgesses of the Borough of Croydon", generally known as the corporation, town council or borough council. When elected county councils were established in 1889, Croydon was considered large enough to provide its own county-level services. It was therefore made a county borough, independent from the new Surrey County Council, whilst remaining part of Surrey for judicial and lieutenancy purposes.

The larger London Borough of Croydon and its council were created under the London Government Act 1963, with the first election held in 1964. For its first year the council acted as a shadow authority alongside the area's two outgoing authorities, being the councils of the County Borough of Croydon and the Coulsdon and Purley Urban District. The new council formally came into its powers on 1 April 1965, at which point the old districts and their councils were abolished. The council's full legal name is "The Mayor and Burgesses of the London Borough of Croydon".

From 1965 until 1986 the council was a lower-tier authority, with upper-tier functions provided by the Greater London Council. The split of powers and functions meant that the Greater London Council was responsible for "wide area" services such as fire, ambulance, flood prevention, and refuse disposal; with the boroughs (including Croydon) responsible for "personal" services such as social care, libraries, cemeteries and refuse collection. As an outer London borough council, Croydon has been a local education authority since 1965. The Greater London Council was abolished in 1986 and its functions passed to the London Boroughs, with some services provided through joint committees.

Since 2000 the Greater London Authority has taken some responsibility for highways and planning control from the council, but within the English local government system the council remains a "most purpose" authority in terms of the available range of powers and functions.

On 11 November 2020, the council issued a Section 114 Notice, under the Local Government Finance Act 1988, due to its difficult financial position, a de facto declaration of bankruptcy.

Private Eye magazine Rotten Borough Awards 2020 named Croydon the most rotten borough, and Croydon was in the Private Eye annual list of Britain’s rottenest boroughs for seven consecutive years from 2017 to 2023.

Following a petition in 2020, and a referendum in October 2021, more than 80% of votes favoured a change to a directly elected mayor. The first direct election of a Croydon Mayor was in May 2022.

== Powers and functions ==
The local authority derives its powers and functions from the London Government Act 1963 and subsequent legislation, and has the powers and functions of a London borough council. It sets council tax and as a billing authority it also collects precepts for Greater London Authority functions and business rates. It sets planning policies which complement Greater London Authority and national policies, and decides on almost all planning applications accordingly. It is also the local education authority.

Some 10,000 people work directly or indirectly for the council, at its main offices at Bernard Weatherill House or in its schools, care homes, housing offices or work depots.

== Political control ==
The council has been under no overall control since the 2022 election, being run by a minority Conservative administration under Jason Perry, the directly elected Mayor of Croydon.

The first election was held in 1964, initially operating as a shadow authority alongside the outgoing authorities until it came into its powers on 1 April 1965. Political control of the council since 1965 has been as follows:

Party in control	Years
No overall control	1965–1968
Conservative	1968–1994
Labour	1994–2006
Conservative	2006–2014
Labour	2014–2022
No overall control	2022–present

=== Leadership ===
Prior to 2022, political leadership was provided by the leader of the council. The leaders from 1965 to 2022 were:

Councillor	Party	From	To
Albert Dunn	Conservative	1965	1967
Digby Weightman	Conservative	1967	1970
Albert Dunn	Conservative	1970	1976
Peter Bowness	Conservative	1976	1979
Stanley Littlechild	Conservative	1979	1980
Peter Bowness	Conservative	1980	1994
Mary Walker	Labour	1994	1996
Geraint Davies	Labour	1996	1997
Val Shawcross	Labour	1997	2000
Hugh Malyan	Labour	2000	2005
Tony Newman	Labour	2005	2006
Mike Fisher	Conservative	2006	May 2014
Tony Newman	Labour	3 Jun 2014	12 Oct 2020
Hamida Ali	Labour	22 Oct 2020	8 May 2022

In 2022 the council changed to having a directly elected mayor as its political leader. The directly elected mayor is termed the 'executive mayor' to distinguish it from the more ceremonial position of the 'civic mayor', who chairs council meetings. The executive mayor since 2022 has been:

Mayor	Party	From	To
Jason Perry	Conservative	9 May 2022	

=== Composition ===
Following the 2026 election, the composition of the council is:

Party	Councillors
Labour	30
Conservative	28
Green	8
Liberal Democrats	2
Reform	2
Total	70

The next election is due in May 2030.

=== Cabinet ===
The cabinet is appointed by the executive mayor. The current composition of Croydon Council's cabinet is as follows:

Party key	Conservative

Post	Member	Ward
Mayor and Deputy Mayor
Mayor of Croydon	Jason Perry	Elected Mayor
Deputy Mayor of Croydon; Cabinet Member for Homes	Lynne Hale	Sanderstead
Cabinet members
Cabinet Member for Finance	Jason Cummings	Shirley South
Cabinet Member for Children and Young People	Maria Gatland	South Croydon
Cabinet Member for Health and Adult Social Care	Yvette Hopley	Sanderstead
Cabinet Member for Community Safety	Ola Kolade	Kenley
Cabinet Member for Planning and Regeneration	Jeet Bains	Addiscombe East
Cabinet Member for Streets and Environment	Scott Roche	Shirley South
Cabinet Member for Communities and Culture	Andy Stranack	Selsdon Vale & Forestdale

=== Shadow Cabinet ===
The largest opposition group on the council forms a Shadow Cabinet. The current composition of Croydon Council's Shadow Cabinet is as follows:

Party key	Labour

Post	Member	Ward
Leader and Deputy Leaders of the Opposition
Leader of the Opposition	Stuart King	West Thornton
Deputy Leader of the Opposition; Shadow Cabinet Member for Finance	Leila Ben-Hassel	Norbury & Pollards Hill
Deputy Leader of the Opposition; Shadow Cabinet Member for Health and Adult Social Care	Janet Campbell	West Thornton
Shadow Cabinet members
Shadow Cabinet Member for Children and Young People	Brigitte Graham	Woodside
Shadow Cabinet Member for Parks and Culture	Aba Amoah	Broad Green
Shadow Cabinet Member for Communities, Safety, and Justice	Manju Shahul-Hameed	Broad Green
Shadow Cabinet Member for Homes	Ellily Ponnuthurai	Waddon
Shadow Cabinet Member for Planning and Regulatory Services	Sean Fitzsimons	Addiscombe West
Shadow Cabinet Member for Streets and Enforcement	Tom Bowell	Broad Green

== Premises ==
The council meets at Croydon Town Hall on Katherine Street, which was completed for the old county borough council in 1896.

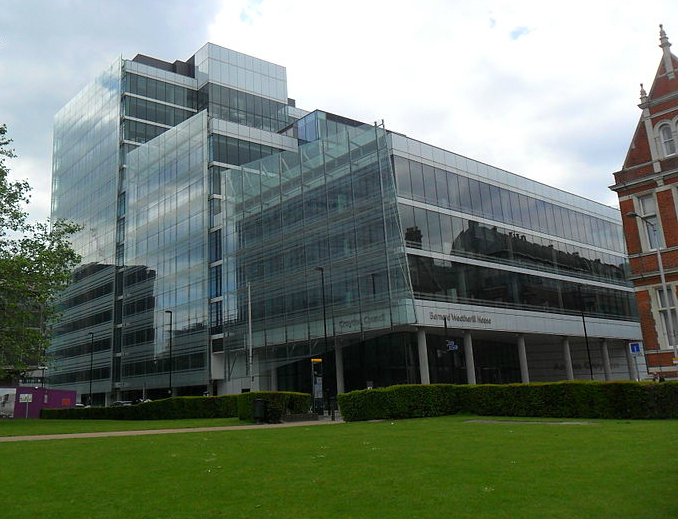
Bernard Weatherill House, 8 Mint Walk, Croydon, CR0 1EA: Council's main offices

The council has its main offices at Bernard Weatherill House on Mint Walk, immediately south of the Town Hall. The building was purpose-built for the council and opened in 2013 to replace the council's former offices at Taberner House on Park Lane, which was subsequently demolished.

== Elections ==
Since the last boundary changes in 2018 the council has comprised 70 councillors representing 28 wards, with each ward electing one, two or three councillors. Elections are held every four years. The addition of the directly elected mayor in 2022 means that there are now 71 seats on the council overall. The mayor is also elected every four years, at the same time as the council.

== Notable councillors ==
Notable former councillors include former MPs Andrew Pelling, Vivian Bendall, David Congdon, Geraint Davies and Reg Prentice, London Assembly member Valerie Shawcross, Lord Bowness, John Donaldson, Baron Donaldson of Lymington (Master of the Rolls) and H.T. Muggeridge, MP and father of Malcolm Muggeridge. The first Mayor of the newly created county borough was Jabez Balfour, later a disgraced Member of Parliament. Former Conservative Director of Campaigning, Gavin Barwell, was a Croydon councillor between 1998 and 2010 and was the MP for Croydon Central from 2010 until 2017.
