= EPR Architects =

London-based architectural practice

Practice information
- Key architects: Cecil Elsom (1912–2006), founding senior partner
- Founded: 1947

Significant works and honors
- Buildings: The OWO, NoMad London, Loveday Belgravia, OSMO, 24 Savile Row, The Ned, Ram Quarter, Rosewood London, 60 London Wall, Cardinal Place

Website
- https://www.epr.co.uk/

EPR Architects is a London-based architectural practice first established in late 1945 by Cecil Elsom CBE (17 January 1912 - 3 April 2006) before becoming Elsom, Pack and Roberts in 1947, under the names of its founders, Cecil Elsom, William Pack and Alan Roberts. It is known for delivering architecture, masterplanning and interior design with particular expertise in the hospitality, workplace and residential sectors.

The practice changed its name to EPR Partnership in the eighties, and then to EPR Architects in 1988. In 2022, the practice moved into a new RIBA Award and BCO Award winning central London headquarters, All Saints, Southwark, which is a retrofit of the Imperial War Museums' All Saints Annexe and net zero carbon in operation. They also have studios in Manchester and the Polish City of Wrocław. In 2025, EPR ranked at position 15 out of 100 in the Architects’ Journal's definitive record of the UK’s largest architectural practices.

== Projects ==
As pre-eminent hotel architects in London, EPR’s key hospitality projects include existing heritage buildings that have been adapted for new uses such as The Ned, the former Bank of England, NoMad London, the former Bow St Magistrates’ Court and police station and the Old War Office building (now The OWO) in Whitehall.In 2026, they completed the interior architecture of Six Senses London, a hotel in the former Whiteleys building and the hotelier’s first entry in the UK hospitality space. According to Building, they have been commissioned to restore and extend The Ritz Hotel, on what is to be the "biggest refurbishment in the world-famous hotel's 115-year history". New-build hotel schemes include the Hoxton, Shepherd’s Bush, which won the main ‘Environment Award’ at the 2023 Hammersmith Society Awards, and The BoTree in Marylebone.

Notable office projects include Cardinal Place, London, prominent developments in the City of London such as the 2021 NLA Environmental Prize winner 60 London Wall and 100 Cheapside, the American Express UK headquarters in Brighton, British Land’s London headquarters, York House, and the net zero carbon OSMO in Battersea. The practice collaborated with ceramic artist Kate Malone on 24 Savile Row, an office building clad in 10,000 bespoke, crystalline glazed tiles. Other office projects include Colloco and The Alberton in Manchester, both designed to deliver an operationally net zero carbon workspace.

EPR has designed many prominent residential schemes including the pioneering sustainable development Greenwich Millenium Village, St James’s House, the transformation of a Grade II* listed former office building into luxury residences, Ram Quarter, a residential-led mixed-use masterplan in Wandsworth, the Quayside Quarter masterplan in Southall, Longley Place, Brighton's first build-to-rent offering, and Loveday Belgravia, a new-build dementia and senior living care development in Westminster.

EPR's recent interior design projects include Island, a workplace in Manchester which won at the Mix Awards North 2025 and Rosi at The Beaumont Hotel in Mayfair, a restaurant incorporating interiors inspired by murals by artist Luke Edward Hall.

Other projects include the pro bono retrofit of an unused basement car park of the Northern & Shell building into a new headquarters for the Royal Society for Blind Children, providing workspace for the charity's staff and flexible spaces for young blind and partially sighted people to meet, play and develop essential life skills.

== Cecil Elsom ==
According to Elsom's obituary in The Times: "[He was an] Architect who appreciated classical design and restoration but also provided London with admirable postwar buildings." Projects such as the international style Eastbourne Terrace office scheme became the trademark style in the practice's early years, followed by a major scheme at 107–171 Victoria Street.

National Life Stories conducted an oral history interview (C467/10) with Cecil Elsom in 1997 for its Architects Lives' collection held by the British Library.
