= European Consumer Centres Network =

The European Consumer Centres Network (ECC-Net) is an EU-wide network. There is a national contact point called European Consumer Centre (ECC) in all 27 EU Member States, as well as in Iceland and Norway. ECCs provide consumers with information about the opportunities and risks of the European Single Market and also regarding cross-border consumer topics, such as travel, various services, and the purchase of goods and services. The ECC-Net is staffed by legal experts who assist consumers free of charge to solve any dispute that may arise with enterprises based in another EU country, Norway, or Iceland. The ECCs are co-financed by the European Commission and national governments aiming to protect consumer rights and ensure that every EU citizen may take full advantage of the European Single Market. Depending on the formal structure some ECCs are hosted by non-governmental organizations (NGOs), governmental bodies, or independent organizations.

== History ==
The European Consumer Centres Network was established in January 2005 by the European Commission and national governments. As a result of the enlargement of the European Union, the ECC-Net has expanded to include: Bulgaria and Romania in 2007, and Croatia in 2013. Today, there are 29 European Consumer Centres: 27 in the EU Member States, one in Norway, one in Iceland. The ECC-Net originated from two former existing consumer information and protection networks: The Network for the extrajudicial settlement of consumer disputes (EEJ-Net) and the Euroguichet Network.

The EEJ-Net was established in 2001 to help consumers to solve cross-border disputes with traders providing defective goods and services, by guiding them to alternative dispute resolution mechanisms (ADR). The Euroguichets were founded in 1992 at the European Commission's initiative with the objective to inform consumers about the opportunities of the European Single Market and about their rights as consumers in Europe. Moreover, the Euroguichets helped consumers encountering problems with cross-border transactions. The Euroguichets also acted as interfaces between consumers and the European Commission. The European Consumer Centres Network took over the duties of both organisations: It helps consumers to solve cross-border disputes and informs them about their rights in Europe.

== Activities ==
The European Consumer Centres Network:

- informs consumers about popular cross-border topics, e.g. travel, online-shopping, and internet fraud,
- provides advice on consumer rights in Europe, e. g. Air Passengers Rights, Rail Passengers Rights, legal warranties,
- helps consumers who have issues with traders based in another EU country, Iceland or Norway to find an amicable solution,
- enables consumers to take advantage of the European Single Market with full knowledge of their rights and duties,
- conducts surveys on topics related to consumer rights and consumer's experiences with EU legislation in order to identify gaps and emerging issues,
- publishes reports and studies, such as purchasing a vehicle or time-share, guarantees and warranties, and online-shopping,
- launched an application for mobile phones: ECC-Net Travel helps consumers to use their rights while traveling in the EU, Norway or Iceland. The app is available in 25 languages,
- co-operates with other EU-wide networks, such as the Consumer Protection Cooperation Network, the Europe Direct, the Financial Dispute Resolution Network (FIN-Net), SOLVIT and the European Judicial Network on civil and commercial matters.

All services provided by the ECC-Net are free of charge for consumers.

== Operation ==
An example

A Spanish consumer orders a smartphone from an Italian trader. The smartphone arrives but it does not work properly: the consumer contacts the trader but is left without a reply. He promptly calls his national ECC, in this case the ECC Spain for further assistance. ECC Spain shares the case with ECC Italy. ECC Italy contacts the trader, the conflict is resolved and the consumer is reimbursed.

How does the ECC-Net help?

1. The consumer must be confronted by a cross-border issue, that means a dispute with a trader based in another EU country, Norway or Iceland.
2. The consumer must have contacted the trader directly, or made such an attempt, in order to solve the problem.
3. If the problem cannot be solved, the consumer may call the ECC of this home-country ("national ECC") for help. The national ECC may be contacted by mail, online form, by phone, and occasionally in person. See below: List of national ECCs.
4. The national ECC shares the case with the ECC of the trader's country.
5. The trader's ECC contacts the trader to find an amicable solution.

More than two thirds of disputes are solved in favor of the consumer. If no solution can be found, the ECCs help consumers to find an appropriate Alternative Dispute Resolution body or inform them about other possibilities, e. g. Small Claim Procedure, European Payment Order to solve the problem.

The ECC-Net cannot help:

- solve business-to-business or private issues,
- national issues,
- problems concerning a governmental body (ministry, national agency),

Additionally, the ECCs cannot represent the consumer in court nor enforce the law to apply sanctions on traders.

== Statistics ==
- The European Consumer Centres Network receives more than 120.000 requests from consumers each year. More than 650.000 people contacted the ECC-Net during the first ten years. Nearly 300.000 reported problems with a trader, contacted the ECC-Net for assistance and filed a complaint. The remaining 350.000 requested consumer information. For example: in 2015, 93.964 consumers contacted the ECC-Net in total, 55.916 requested information, and 38.048 issued complaints, showing the development of contacts and complaints from 2005 until 2015.
- Approximately 140 lawyers and juridical experts work for the European Consumer Centres Network in total.
- 26 languages are spoken.

For further statistics, see ECC-Net publications.

== Background ==
An effective European consumer policy aims at safeguarding consumer's rights through legislation: this includes offering help and advice in order to solve disputes with traders based in another EU-country, Iceland or Norway in an amicable way. Well-informed consumers may take full advantage of the European Single Market through lower prices, better conditions, and a wider range of products, both online and in person.

The European Consumer Centres Network was established to provide consumers with clear information about their rights and to assist them to effectively solving a consumer issue; this improves consumers' confidence in the European Single Market and helps to enforce economic potential for growth.

Given the rapid increase in online consumerism, the role of the ECC-Net in solving cross-border e-commercial disputes - without going to court - has grown substantially. Therefore, the role of the ECC-Net will continue to expand in regards to the European Digital Single Market.
