= Europe Direct =

Europe Direct is a European information network designated by the European Commission. The target group is all citizens of the European Union.

== Network ==
Europe Direct includes EUROPE DIRECT Centres, European Documentation Centres (EDC), the EU Team EUROPE DIRECT speakers bureau and the call centre Europe Direct Contact Centre. The network was created in 2005 and restructured in February 2009.

== Costs ==
All European Direct offers are free of charge. Team Europe may require travel costs and a fee.

== Mission ==
The main aim of Europe Direct is to provide European citizens with general information on the European Union. Other aims include the answering of questions on political activities of the European Union and promoting European integration. Advice and practical tips on rights entitled to Union citizens are provided.

Inquiries to the Europe Direct Contact Centre, in any of the current 24 official languages, are processed in a central contact point and answered in the same language. The customer service staff must be fluent in at least three languages and have a university degree.

Europe Direct support is available via telephone (free of charge within the EU and on a uniform number), e-mail or web-chat. The EU-wide network of 424 EUROPE DIRECT centres (including 7 in Ireland, 3 in Malta and one in Curaçao (launched in May 2021)) are open to the public. The current generation of EUROPE DIRECT centres started its activities on 1 May 2021 and will continue until 2025. These centres are run by national or private organisations under a public contract. They are co-funded by the European Commission.
