= Royal Society for Blind Children =

British charity

Royal Society for Blind Children (RSBC) joined with the Royal London Society for Blind People (RLSB) on 1 January 2017. This created one charity across England & Wales. The charity aim is to ensure blind and partially sighted children, from 0–25 years old, grow up with the skills they need to live a full, happy life.
