= Croydon Town Hall =

Municipal building in London, England

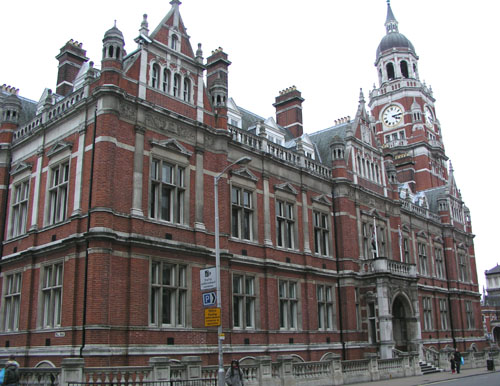
- Croydon Town Hall

- Shown in Croydon
- 51.37223°N 0.09896°W
- Location: Katharine Street, Croydon

History
- Built: 1896

Site notes
- Architect: Charles Henman
- Architectural style: Victorian style

Listed Building – Grade II
- Designated: 19 November 1973
- Reference no.: 1188798

Croydon Town Hall is a council building in Katharine Street, Croydon which serves as the headquarters for Croydon London Borough Council. It is a Grade II listed building.

== History ==
Croydon's first town hall, which was located on the west side of the High Street, was initially intended as a market house and was completed in 1566: it was subsequently used as a town hall until it was demolished in 1807. The second town hall, which was built on the site of the first town hall, was designed by Samuel Pepys Cockerell in the classical style and completed in 1808; it was demolished as part of the town's High Street widening scheme in 1893.

After civic leaders found that the town hall in the High Street was inadequate for their needs, they elected to construct a purpose-built town hall: they chose the site of Central Croydon railway station, which was redeveloped for council use in 1895, as part of a plan to install "Municipal Offices, Courts, a Police Station, Library and many other public purposes and yet leave a considerable margin of land which might be disposed of". The building, which was designed by Charles Henman in the Victorian style and built in red brick by Messrs. W.H. Lascelles & Co, was officially opened by the Prince and Princess of Wales on 19 May 1896.

The design involved a symmetrical main frontage with nine bays facing onto Katherine Street; the central section featured an arched porch on the ground floor; there was a large segmented window on the first floor and five narrow round headed windows on the second floor with the borough coat of arms above. A square clocktower, 176 feet (54 m) tall, was erected adjacent to the west of the main building. The clock and bells were made by the Croydon firm of Gillett & Johnston. Above each clockface was a keystone carved in the form of a human head, representing respectively the four cardinal points of the compass: an "Esquimaux" (north), a "Hottentot" (south), a "Chinaman" (east) and an "American Indian" (west). To the west of the clocktower was Braithwaite Hall, with pitched roof and turret, and the corn exchange, with loggia. Braithwaite Hall was named after the Revd John Masterman Braithwaite (1846–1889), a former vicar of Croydon. (Note: John Braithwaite was the father of the actress, Lilian Braithwaite.) Internally, the principal rooms were the council chamber, the mayor's parlour and the committee rooms.

A statue of Queen Victoria, which was sculpted by Francis John Williamson, was erected outside the town hall in 1903. A war memorial, designed by James Burford and incorporating two bronze sculptures by Paul Raphael Montford, was erected in 1921.

The building served as the headquarters of the County Borough of Croydon for much of the 20th century and went to become the local seat of government of the enlarged London Borough of Croydon on its formation in 1965. Council officers and their departments moved out to Taberner House, located to the south east of the town hall, in 1967. The building continued to be used as a judicial facility until the combined courts centre in Barclay Road opened in 1968.

The whole building, including the council chamber, the mayor's parlour and committee rooms, was extensively renovated in the late-1980s and early 1990s. This enabled parts of the building which were not required for council meetings to be re-purposed as an arts venue known as the Croydon Clocktower in 1994. At the same time a new public library was established in a new structure behind the town hall and the old local studies library was converted for use as the new David Lean Cinema. Meanwhile, Braithwaite Hall continued to be made available for concerts, theatre and children's shows.

After Taberner House became inefficient to operate, council officers and their departments moved to Bernard Weatherill House, located to the south of the town hall, in May 2013.
