= Central Croydon railway station =

Former railway station in England

Central Croydon
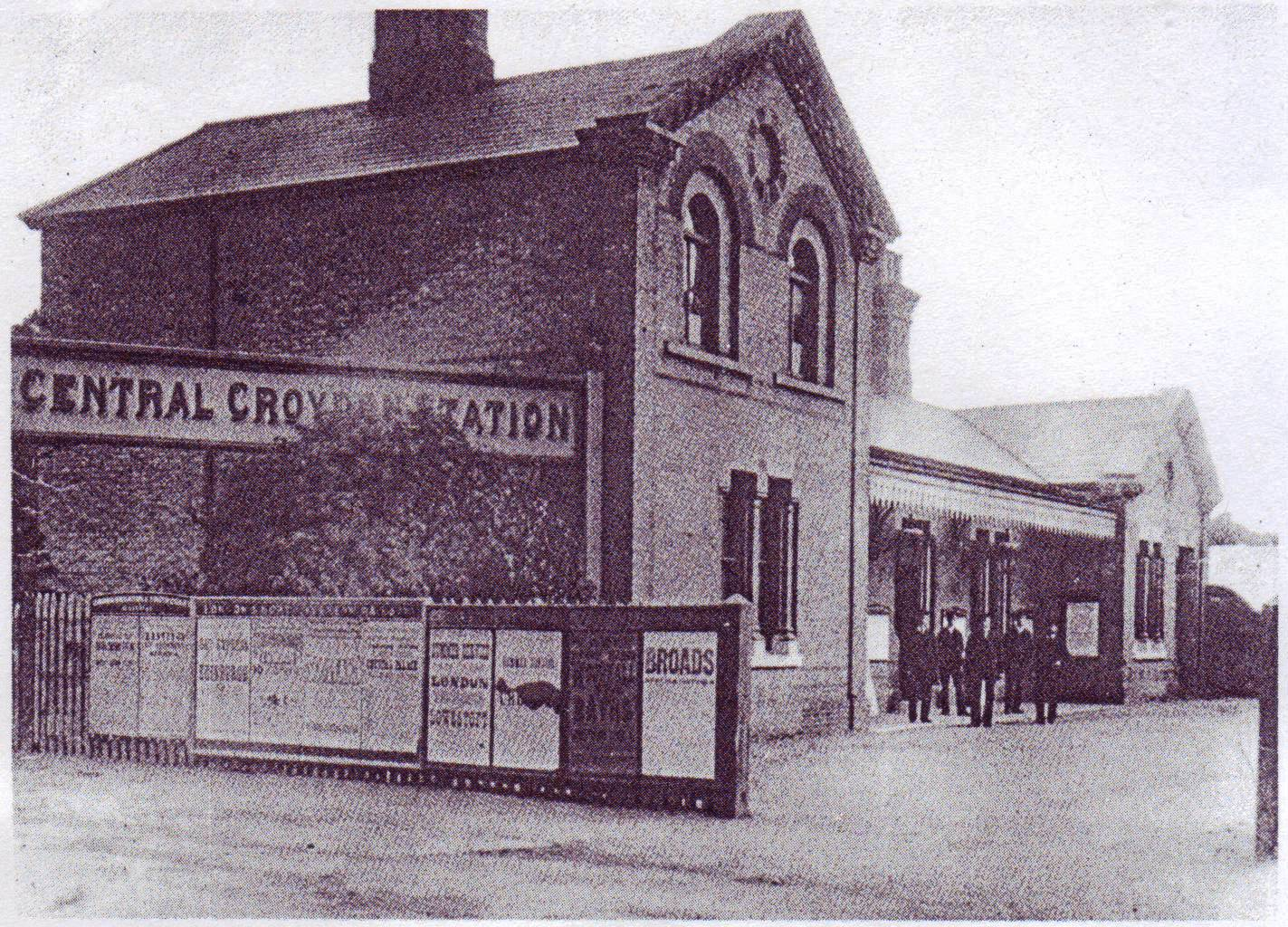
- The station in 1890
- Interactive map of Central Croydon

General information
- Location: Croydon
- Local authority: Croydon
- Owner: London, Brighton and South Coast Railway
- Number of platforms: 2

Key dates
- 1868: Opened
- 1871: Closed
- 1886: Reopened
- 1890: Closed

Other information
- Coordinates: 51°22′20″N 0°5′59″W

Central Croydon railway station in Croydon, England, was a largely unsuccessful venture by the London Brighton and South Coast Railway to bring trains closer to the centre of Croydon, as East Croydon station was deemed too far from the busy town centre. It originally opened in 1868 and closed in 1871: it then reopened in 1886, before closing permanently in 1890. Its site was used for the building of Croydon Town Hall, erected in 1892–1896.

== Authorisation ==
Then a thriving market town of around 20,000 inhabitants on the southern fringe of London, Croydon was first connected with the railway network in 1839 when the London and Croydon Railway opened a station (now West Croydon) on London Road. Two years later, the London and Brighton Railway opened a station (now East Croydon) on the other side of town. Both stations were a fair distance from the town centre and the local stage coach, previously the dominant mode of transport but now undercut by the railway, sought to create new business by ferrying passengers to and from the stations.

This situation prevailed until 1863 when, under pressure to provide a more convenient station, the London, Brighton and South Coast Railway (LBSCR) (formed in 1846 by a merger of the Brighton and Croydon companies) promoted the London, Brighton and South Coast Railway (Additional Powers) Bill which, amongst other matters, sought authorisation for the construction of a branch from East Croydon to Katharine Street, where a new "Central Station" would be built. The Act passed into law on 29 July 1864 and the LBSCR began purchasing the necessary land, a whole block between the present-day Mint Walk and Katharine Street up to the High Street. The line and station were initially intended to approach Katharine Street at an angle, but a realignment of the route made it parallel with Katharine Street, reducing the amount of land needed. The plot of land to the west of Park Street was purchased for £11,217 and a contract was awarded to Messrs John T Chappell of Steyning to construct the line and station for £4,089.

An Ordnance Survey map surveyed in 1867–69 shows the station as "Katharine Street Station", which may have been an early proposed name. The station opened as Central Croydon, leaving the map in error.

The branch left the Brighton Main Line just south of George Street and curved sharply west, where the Fairfield Halls are today. It passed under Park Lane, through the present-day Queen's Gardens to the site of the Croydon Clocktower and Town Hall.

== Operations ==
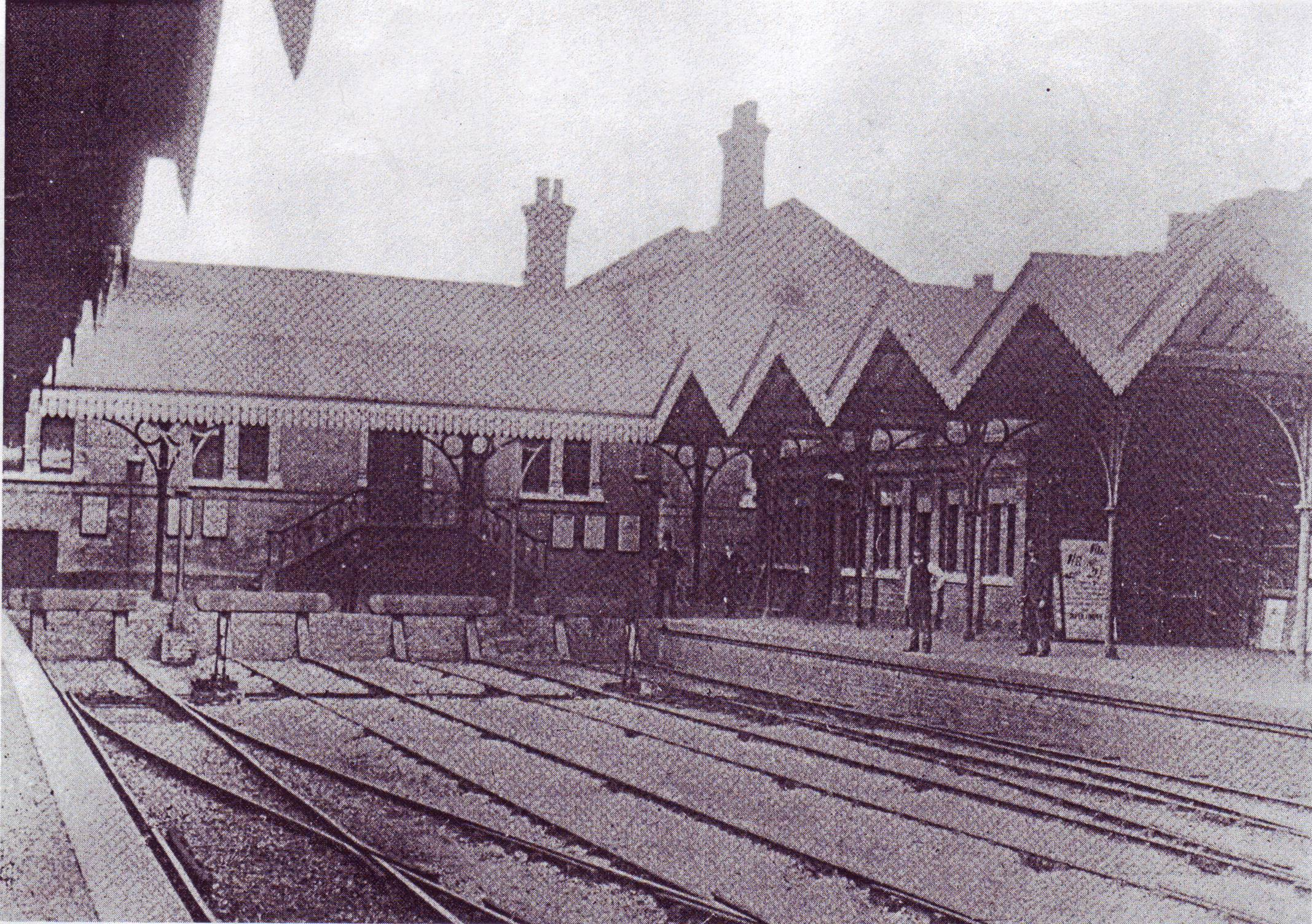
Only known photograph of the station interior, showing track layout and crossovers

Opened on 1 January 1868, the station was served from platforms 1 and 2 of New Croydon, an extension of East Croydon dealing with local traffic. Initially there were 12 trains per day, to and from London Bridge, but the commercial judgement that had created the station went unrewarded and services ceased after three years, on 1 December 1871. The station was mothballed until 1 June 1886 when, under pressure from the council, it was reopened. Around this time, the LBSCR sought to improve the usefulness of the branch by extending it under High Street to curve around to the right to join the West Croydon - Epsom line at West Croydon, but this plan, which might have seen it become a viable station, was not realised.

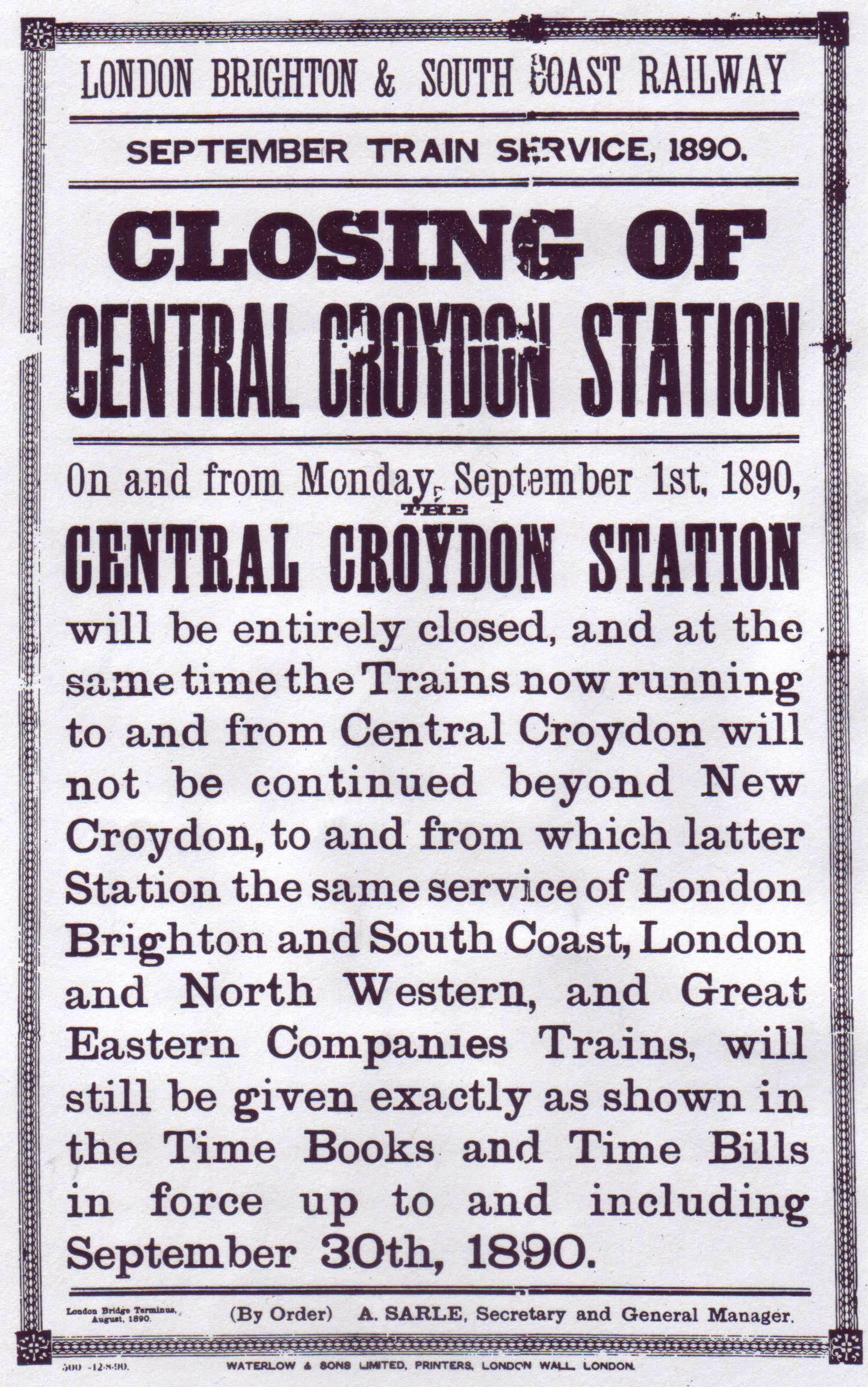
Poster advertising the station's final closure

The reopening of the station in 1886 was for London & North Western Railway and Great Eastern Railway (not LBSCR) trains, providing, by all accounts, a generally poor service. The withdrawal of services on 1 September 1890 came therefore as little surprise; it was hoped that the station would give impetus to the development of High Street, but this never materialised and ironically it was only after the demolition of the station that plans for the area could be advanced. Two years before reopening, a "High Street Improvement Committee" had been set up with the aim of carrying out necessary civic improvements such as the widening of High Street and the laying of a tram line, and the station, which occupied the main road frontage, stood in the way.

Anxious to rid itself of an unprofitable facility, in 1889 the LBSCR offered the land for sale for £12,500. A figure of £11,500 was agreed on condition that the LBSCR leave in place the retaining walls supporting part of Katharine Street. The council intended to erect its municipal offices, courts, a police station and library on part of the land, hoping that the presence of public facilities would increase the value of the remainder. By 1890, the necessary agreements and consents for the sale were in place, drawing to a close Central Croydon's short history.

The short section from the main line as far as Park Lane remained in use as "Fairfield Yard" engineers sidings until 1933, when they were abandoned.

== The site today ==
The site of the station is occupied by the Town Hall. A short section of landscaped cutting and some of the retaining walls can be seen in the Queen's Gardens. No other trace of the station remains, but a plaque on the retaining wall of the gardens marks its significance.

== Gallery ==
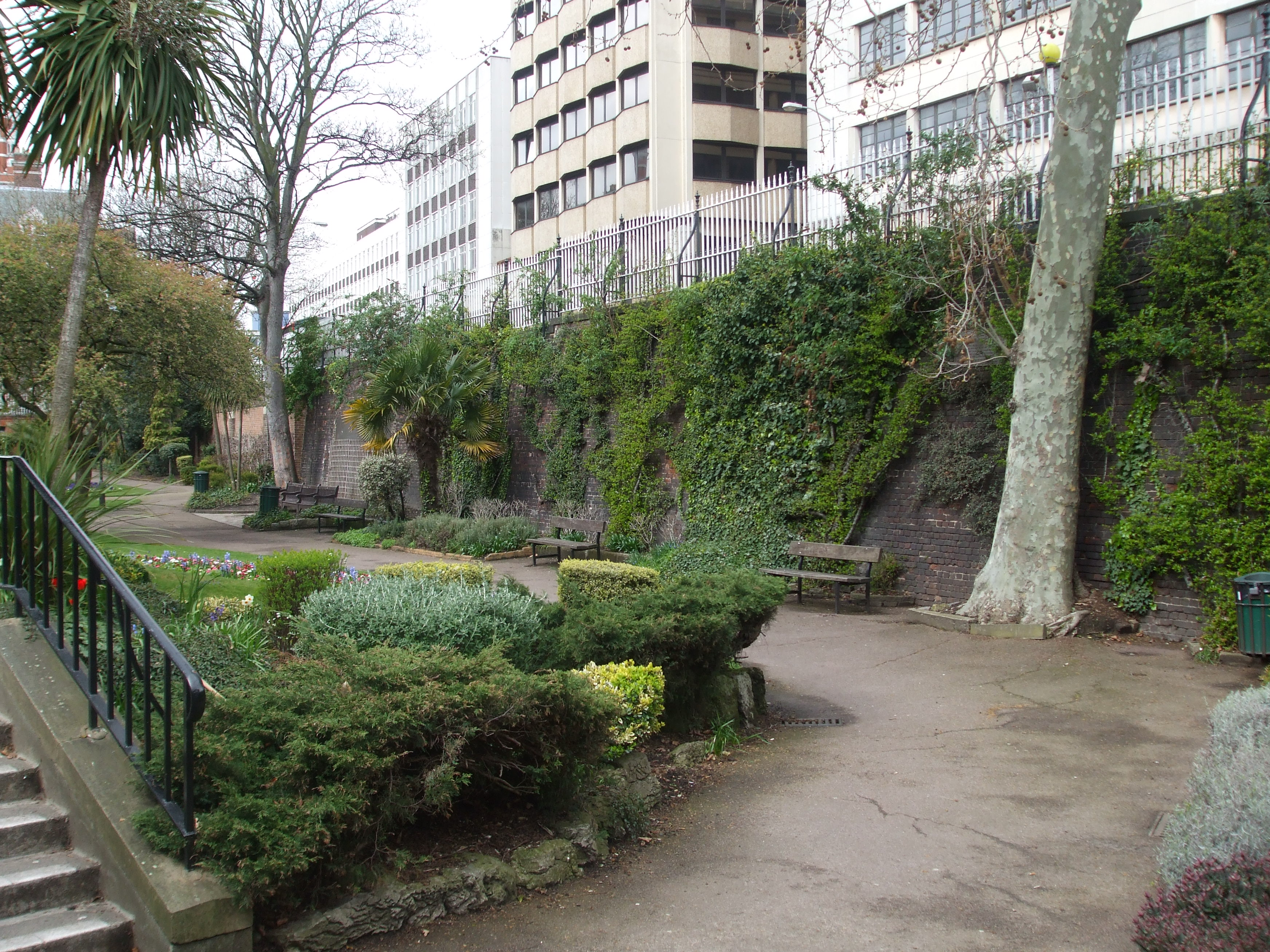
The retaining wall in the cutting east of Central Croydon Station, now part of the Queen's Gardens

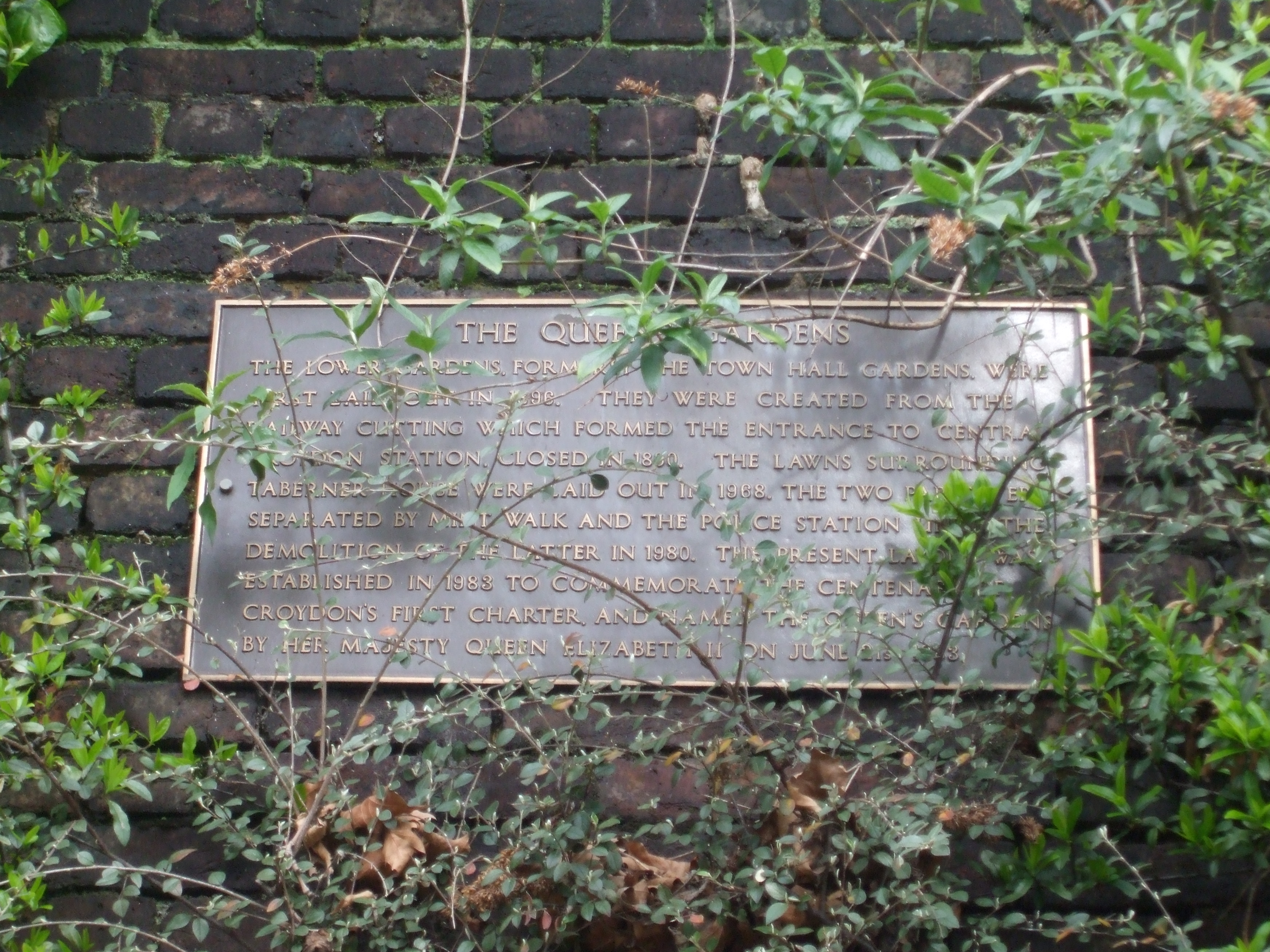
Plaque on the retaining wall commemorating the station

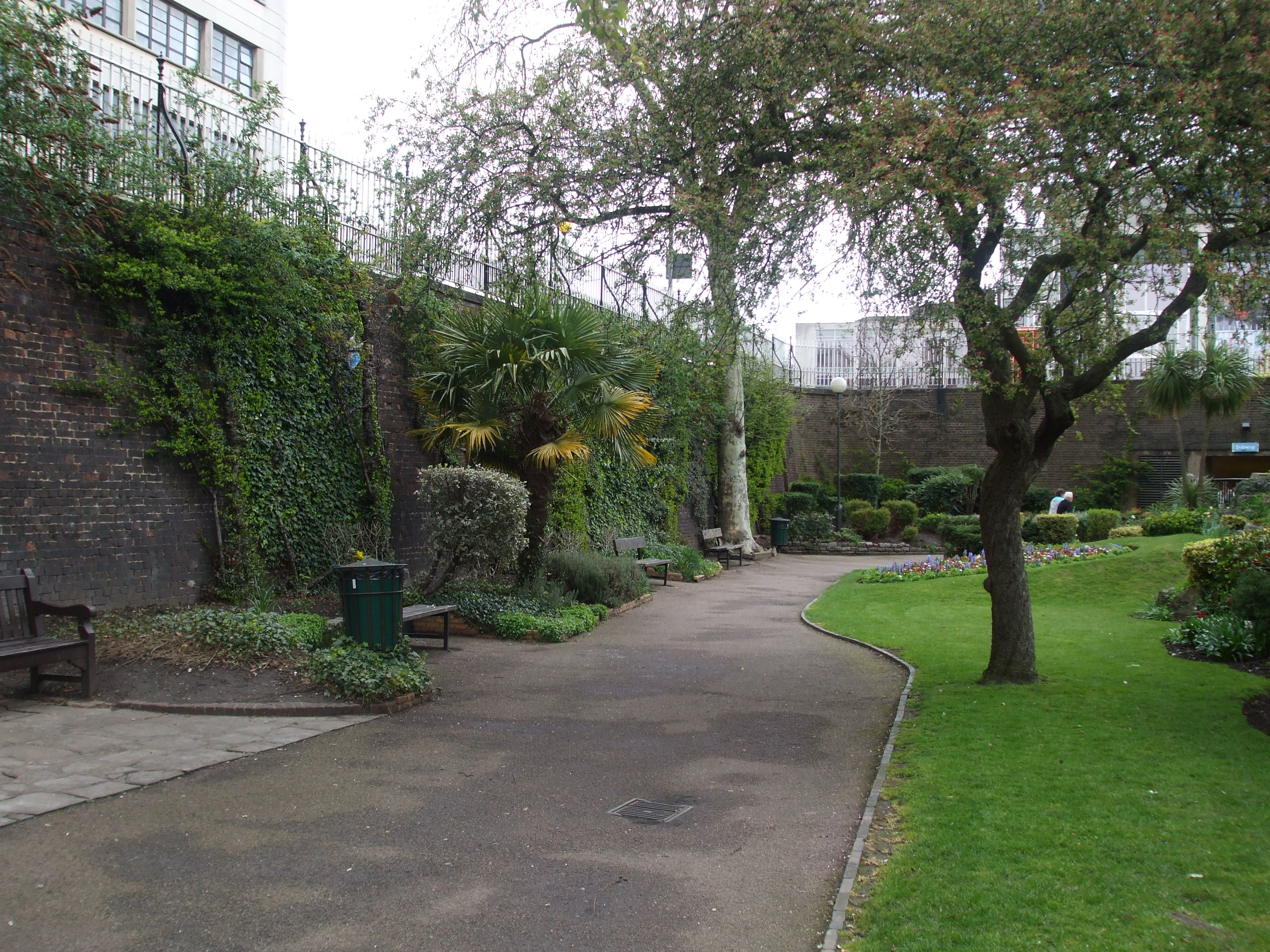
The retaining wall viewed eastwards, towards the Fairfield Halls and the main-line junction

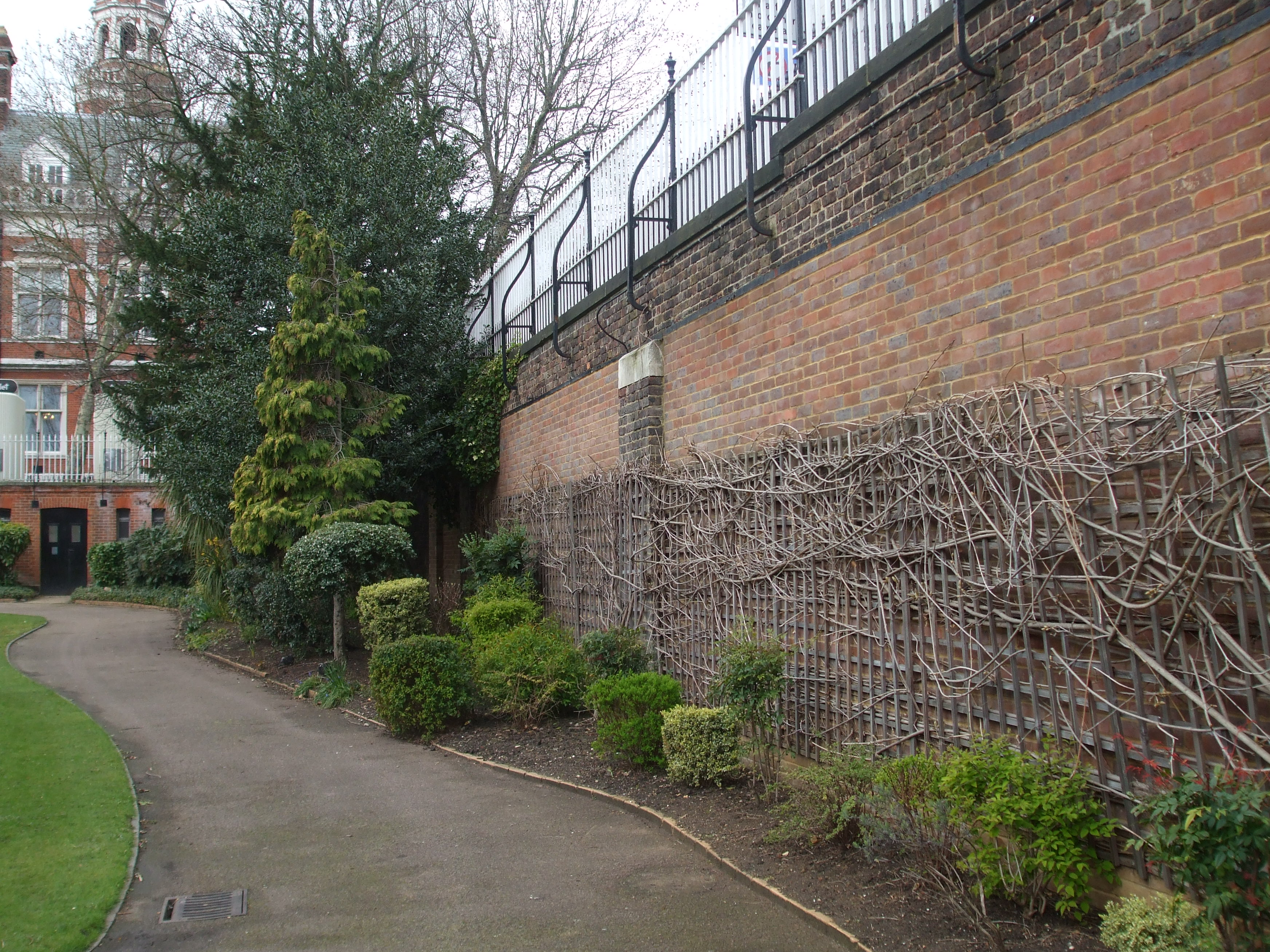
Close-up of the retaining wall

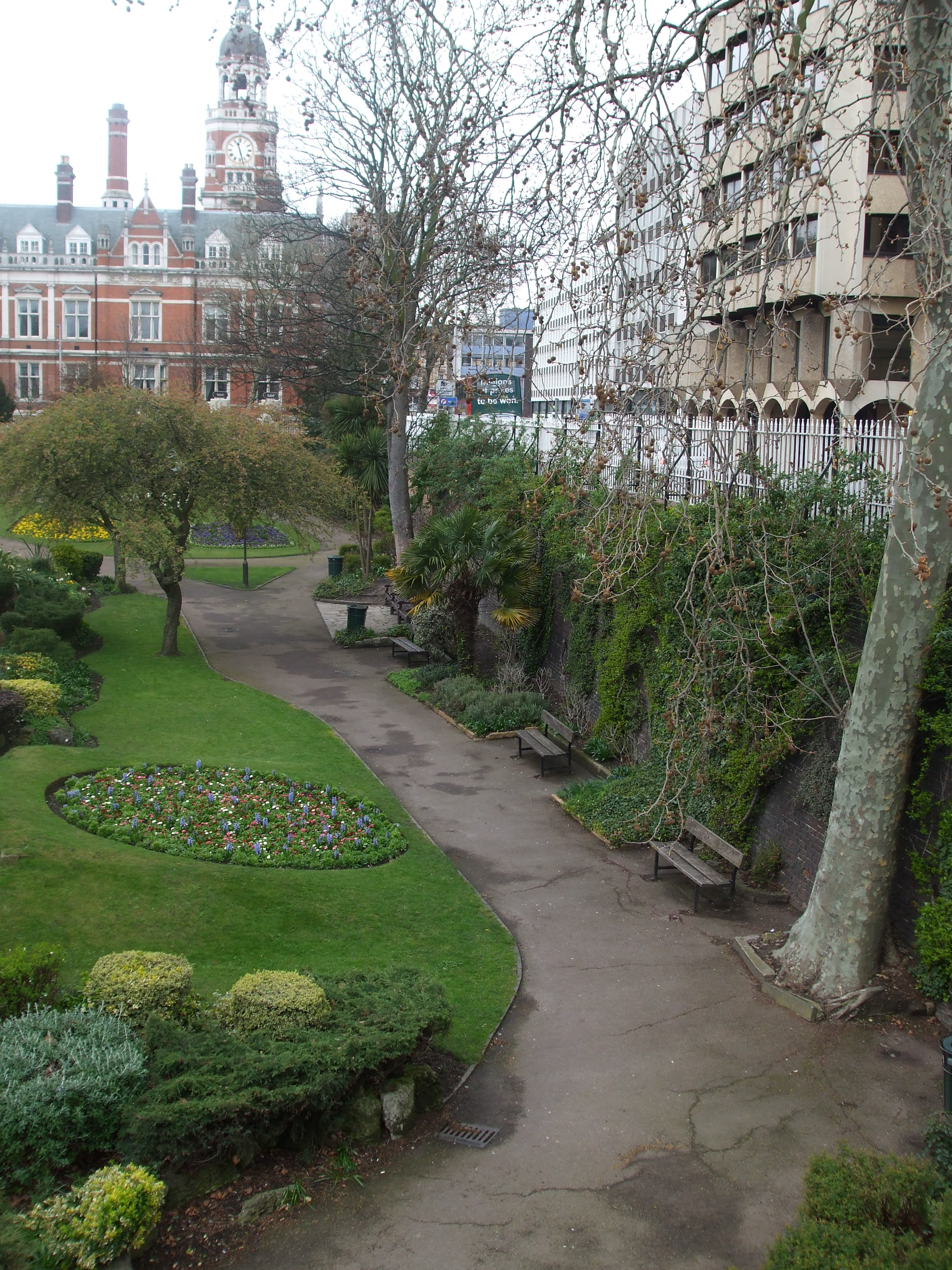
The retaining wall viewed westwards, towards the Town Hall and the end of the line
