= Nettleship =

Nettleship is a surname. Notable people with this surname include:

- Ada Nettleship (1856-1932), British dressmaker and costume designer
- Edward Nettleship (1845–1913), English ophthalmologist
- Henry Nettleship (1839–1893), English classical scholar.
- Ida Nettleship (1877–1907), English artist
- John Nettleship (1939–2011), British schoolteacher of chemistry
- John Trivett Nettleship (1841–1902), English artist
- R. L. Nettleship (1846–1892), English philosopher

== See also ==
- Thomas Nettleship Staley, British bishop
- Nettleship–Falls syndrome, an ocular disorder
- Nettleship v Weston, English Court of Appeal judgment
