= Ursula Tyrwhitt =

English painter and draughtsman

Ursula Tyrwhitt (1872–1966) was an English painter and draughtsman.

== Biography ==
Ursula Tyrwhitt was born in Nazeing, Essex. Her father was Henry Mervyn Tyrwhitt, the vicar of Nazeing, and his wife Jacqueline Frances Tyrwhitt (née Otter, the daughter of William Bruère Otter, Archdeacon of Lewes).

Tyrwhitt was educated at Bromley High School. She then studied at the Slade School of Fine Art from 1893 to 1894 and also in 1911 and 1912. She also studied in Paris at the Académie Colarossi and in Rome at the British Academy.

Tyrwhitt was a close friend of Welsh artist Gwen John and her brother Augustus Edwin John and is the subject of a 1903 etching by him held by the National Portrait Gallery, London. John also made a chalk drawing of her with Gwen John and Ida Nettleship (his first wife) which is held by the Yale Center for British Art in the Paul Mellon Collection. Tyrwhitt made her only known sculpture while visiting Gwen John in France.

Tyrwhitt exhibited with the New English Art Club and became a member in 1913. Examples of her work are displayed in The National Library of Wales, the Tate Gallery, Hugh Lane Gallery in Dublin and in the British Council collection. The Ashmolean Museum held a retrospective exhibition in 1973 entitled Ursula Tyrwhitt, Oxford painter and collector 1872–1966.

Tyrwhitt married her second cousin, the artist Walter Spencer Stanhope Tyrwhitt (1859–1932) at St James’s, Piccadilly, London, in 1913. She lived in Puerto de la Cruz, Tenerife and also in Oxford, Oxfordshire.

Trywhitt died in Goring-on-Thames, Oxfordshire, in 1966.
