= Mrs. Atkinson (Gwen John) =

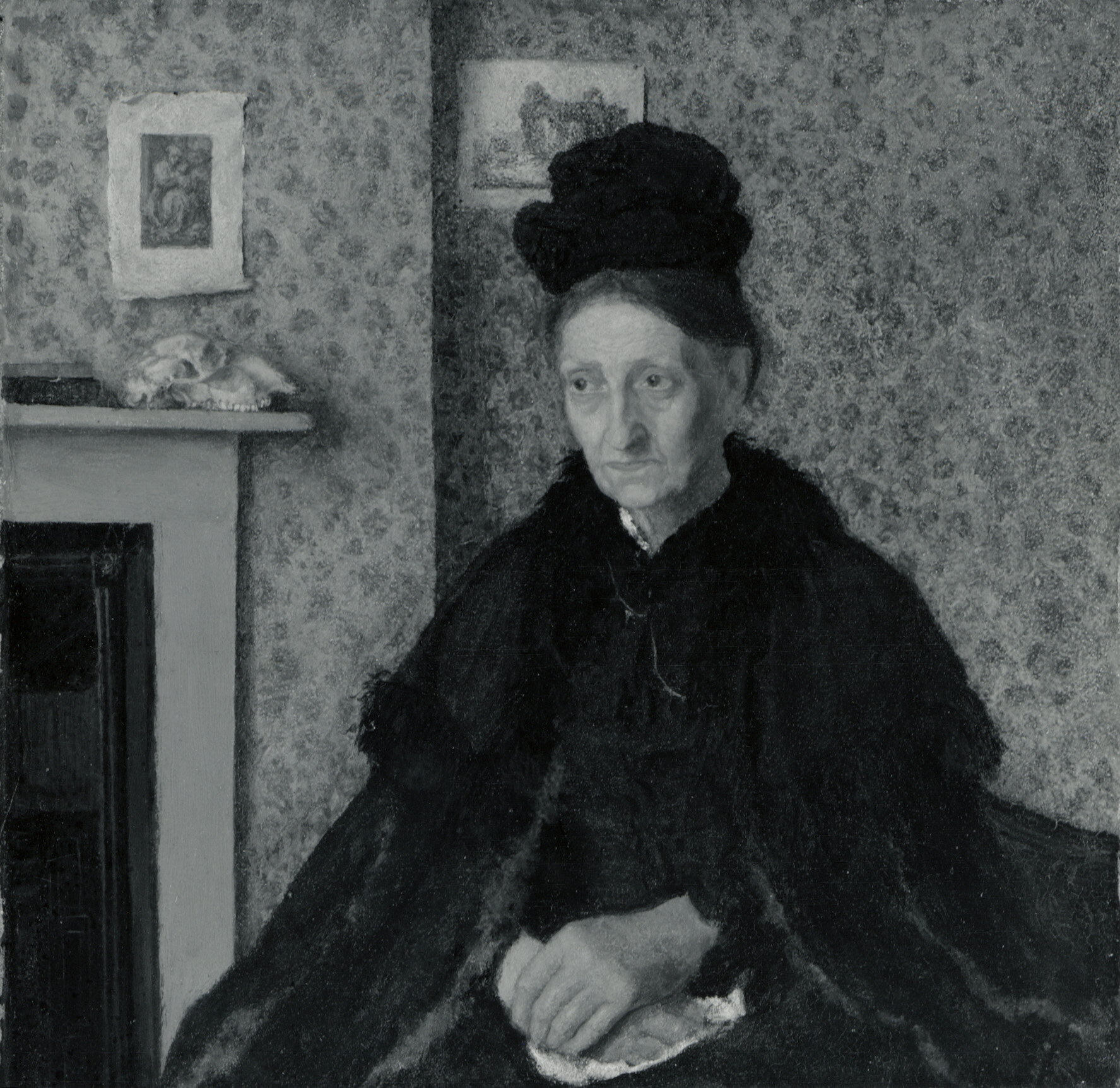
- Artist: Gwen John
- Year: c. 1897
- Medium: Oil paint, panel
- Dimensions: 30.5 cm (12.0 in) × 31.1 cm (12.2 in)
- Location: Metropolitan Museum of Art
- Accession: 1979.135.27

Mrs. Atkinson is a painting (portrait) by Gwen John. It is in the collection of the Metropolitan Museum of Art.

== Description and interpretation ==
The work depicts John's cleaning woman, Mrs. Atkinson, sitting in a room covered with flocked wallpaper. There is a sheep skull on the mantelpiece, though this is not thought to have symbolic meaning.

Simon Schama writes that she is "glancing anxiously sideways, uncertain of what is wanted of her." The painting was exhibited at the New English Art Club in the spring of 1900, marking a strong phase of her career that also saw her Self-portrait on display there about that time. It is considered among the "carefully executed tonal paintings of rather detailed genre subjects" in her first mature oil works.
