= Tristan de Vere Cole =

British television director (born 1935)

Tristan John de Vere Cole
- Born: 16 March 1935 (age 91)
- Education: Kelly College, Tavistock, Devon; Royal Naval College, Dartmouth
- Occupation: TV Director
- Spouses: Diana Crosby Cook (m. 1962); Prudence Murdoch (m. 2000; died 2010)
- Partner: Anne Stow
- Children: 3 Jemma, Cassian, Joshua
- Parents: Augustus John (father); Mavis Cole (mother)
- Relatives: Gwen John (aunt); Caspar John (half-brother); Amaryllis Fleming (half-sister); Gwyneth Johnstone (half-sister); Vivien John (half-sister)
- Military career
- Allegiance: United Kingdom
- Branch: Royal Navy
- Service years: 1953–1960

Tristan John de Vere Cole (born 16 March 1935) is an English television director, now retired. He is believed to be the last-surviving illegitimate son of the painter Augustus John (1878–1961).

In his first career, he was a Royal Navy officer for seven years. His career as a television director included work on Z-Cars, Doctor Who, Emmerdale Farm, Howards' Way and Bergerac.

== Life ==
His mother, Mavis Cole, met painter Augustus John (1878–1961) at the Café Royal in 1928, and agreed to model for him. In 1931 she married Horace de Vere Cole, a well-known Edwardian practical joker, then in 1932 she became the mistress of Augustus John. Cole was born in 1935 and is believed to be John's last-surviving illegitimate son. Cole was brought up in the John household at Fryern Court, Fordingbridge, from the age of 18 months, partly by his mother, and then later by Dorelia McNeill. Cole was educated for three years at Kelly College, Tavistock.

He married Diana Crosby Cook in 1962 and they had two children, a daughter Jemma and a son, London fine art dealer Cassian de Vere Cole (born 1966). After they divorced he had a son Joshua with Claire Oberman but they split shortly before the birth in 1993. Diana died in 2025. In 2000, he married lawyer Prudence Murdoch. She died in 2010. He lives in Sutton Scotney, not far from his partner Anne Stow, eldest grandchild of Neville Chamberlain, a former prime minister, whose wife was a sister of Horace de Vere Cole.

Through his father, Gwen John was Cole's aunt, his half-siblings were cellist Amaryllis Fleming, Sir Caspar John, Gwyneth Johnstone, and Vivien John; Johnstone and Vivien also were artists in their own right. Only Caspar was born from his father's marriage, and he later became prominent as an admiral also in the Royal Navy and First Sea Lord.

== Career ==
From 1951, Cole trained for a naval career at the Royal Naval College, Dartmouth. He went on to serve as an officer in the Royal Navy from 1953 to 1960.

After his return to civilian life, Cole worked at the Bristol Old Vic as assistant stage manager and actor, before moving on to a career with BBC television.

In May 2024 it was reported that Cole had written the screenplay for the adventure thriller Storm Witch, an independent U.K./Ireland co-production, to be directed by David Blair and starring British actress Gemma Arterton.

== Work as television director ==
- Z-Cars (episodes in 1968)
- Doctor Who: The Wheel in Space (1968)
- Take Three Girls (1969)
- Emmerdale Farm (1972–1973)
- Trinity Tales (1975)
- Angels (1976)
- Survivors (1977 episodes)
- Secret Army (1979)
- Juliet Bravo (1980)
- The Spoils of War (1981)
- Howards' Way (1985–1988)
- Rockliffe's Folly (1988)
- Bergerac (1988–1992)
- Trainer (1992)

== Work as film director ==
- Orion's Belt (1985)
- The Dive (1990)

== Publications ==
- With Roderic Owen, Beautiful and Beloved: the Life of Mavis de Vere Cole (Hutchinson, 1974)
