= Mavis Wheeler =

English socialite and artist's model, also known for shooting her lover

- Wheeler in 1939
- Born: Mabel Winifred Mary Wright; 1908; Woolwich, London, England
- Died: 14 October 1970 (aged 61–62)
- Occupation: Artist's model
- Known for: Shooting of Anthony Vivian
- Spouse(s): Horace de Vere Cole; Sir Mortimer Wheeler
- Partner(s): Augustus John; Anthony Vivian, 5th Baron Vivian
- Children: Tristan de Vere Cole

Mavis Wheeler (née Mabel Winifred Mary Wright, also known as Mavis Cole, 1908 – 14 October 1970) was an English artist's model, the mistress of painter Augustus John, and the wife of prankster Horace de Vere Cole and archaeologist Sir Mortimer Wheeler. She came to public notice in 1954 when she shot her lover Anthony Vivian, 5th Baron Vivian.

== Life ==
Wheeler was born in 1908 in Woolwich, Greater London. She was secretive about her background, saying her mother had been "stolen by gypsies" as a child. Her father was a grocer's assistant. At the age of 16, Wheeler was working as a scullery maid. During the 1926 United Kingdom General Strike, she hitchhiked to London carrying a golf club and took a job as nursery governess to a clergyman's children in Wimbledon, London. The next year she was working as a waitress at Veeraswamy Indian restaurant in London.

Wheeler became one of the bright young things of the 1920s, according to The Times. She met the Welsh artist Augustus John at the Café Royal in 1928, when she was 19 and he was 50, and agreed to model for him. He painted her portrait many times.

She also met John's friend, the eccentric Irish prankster William Horace de Vere Cole. His most famous prank was the Dreadnought hoax in 1910 where he and several others in blackface, pretending to be an Abyssinian prince and his entourage, were given a tour of the Royal Navy ship HMS Dreadnought. Wheeler lived with Cole for two years, and married him in January 1931 after he divorced his first wife.

Wheeler became Augustus John's mistress, and in March 1935, she gave birth to Tristan de Vere Cole, who was John's natural son. Tristan Cole was brought up in the John household at Fryern Court, Fordingbridge, from the age of 18 months, partly by his mother, and later by Dorelia McNeill, common-law wife of John. Tristan Cole became a Royal Navy officer and later a television director. He is believed to be the last-surviving illegitimate son of John.

After Horace Cole died in 1936, Wheeler went to 11 Downing Street, the official residence of the Chancellor of the Exchequer, who was Cole's brother-in-law Neville Chamberlain, to collect Cole's belongings from his sister Anne.

In 1937, Mavis met the archaeologist Sir Mortimer Wheeler. She was still John's mistress at the time, and "in a desperate moment, after Mortimer Wheeler climbed into Mavis's room at Fryern, John had challenged his rival to a duel". The duel did not proceed as Mortimer chose field guns as the duelling weapon.

Mavis and Mortimer married in March 1939. Guests included novelist Agatha Christie and her husband, archaeologist Max Mallowan. Mavis was Mortimer's second wife of three. Their relationship was strained; Mavis's diaries revealed that Mortimer hit her when she annoyed him, which he was later shocked at having done. They divorced in 1942 on the grounds of her adultery with Anthony (Tony) Vivian, 5th Baron Vivian, a British impresario-restaurateur.

== Criminal trial and later life ==
In July 1954, Wheeler was arrested for shooting and seriously wounding Lord Vivian at her country home, Pilgrim Cottage, at Potterne, Wiltshire. Giving evidence from his hospital bed in Devizes, Lord Vivian said he was shot while climbing in a window, having lost the key. He said: "I cannot believe now Mrs. Wheeler wanted to kill me. I was always devoted to her and I still am." He and Wheeler lived together in Chelsea, he said, "happily – except she was often jealous even of certain of his men friends". Wheeler was found not guilty of attempted murder and shooting with intent to cause grievous bodily harm. She served a six-month prison sentence at Holloway Gaol for unlawful and malicious wounding. On 2 February 1955, she was released from jail and was photographed by the press strolling with Lord Vivian. According to English socialite Nicky Haslam, Wheeler and Lord Vivian got back together after she was released from prison, and "they lived together happily ever after".

Wheeler died on 14 October 1970.

Tristan de Vere Cole, with author Roderic Owen, wrote a biography of Wheeler, Beautiful and Beloved, (published by Hutchinson, London, 1974), in which his mother was described as a "warm and impulsive woman, the friend and confidante of many of the most fascinating people of the 1930s, the glory and the victim of a social system now vanished."
