= Caspar John =

Royal Navy Admiral of the Fleet (1903–1984)

Admiral of the Fleet Sir Caspar John GCB
- Admiral of the Fleet Sir Caspar John
- Born: 22 March 1903; London, United Kingdom
- Died: 11 July 1984 (aged 81); Hayle, Cornwall, United Kingdom
- Spouse: Mary Vanderpump (m. 1944)
- Children: 3
- Military career
- Allegiance: United Kingdom
- Branch: Royal Navy
- Service years: 1917–1963
- Rank: Admiral of the Fleet
- Commands: First Sea Lord (1960–63); Vice Chief of the Naval Staff (1957-60); HMS Daedalus (1955–57); Third Aircraft Carrier Squadron and Heavy Squadron, Home Fleet (1951–52); HMS Fulmar (1948); HMS Ocean (1945–47); HMS Pretoria Castle (1944–45)
- Conflicts: Chanak Crisis; Second Italo-Abyssinian War; Second World War; Norwegian campaign; Battle of the Atlantic
- Awards: Knight Grand Cross of the Order of the Bath; Mentioned in despatches
- Other work: Chairman, Housing Corporation (1964–68); Member, Security Commission (1964–73); Chairman, Star and Garter Home (1967–72); Vice President, Star and Garter Home (from 1973)

Admiral of the Fleet Sir Caspar John GCB (22 March 1903 – 11 July 1984) was a senior Royal Navy officer who served as First Sea Lord from 1960 to 1963. He was a pioneer in the Fleet Air Arm and fought in the Second World War in a cruiser taking part in the Atlantic convoys, participating in the Norwegian campaign and transporting arms around the Cape of Good Hope to Egypt for use in the western desert campaign. His war service continued as Director-General of Naval Aircraft Production, as naval air attaché at the British embassy in Washington, D.C., and then as Commanding Officer of two aircraft carriers. He went on to serve as First Sea Lord and Chief of the Naval Staff in the early 1960s. In that capacity he was primarily concerned with plans for the building of the new CVA-01 aircraft carriers.

== Early life ==
Born the second of the five sons of the artist Augustus John (1878–1961) and his first wife, Ida John, née Nettleship (1877–1907), John was raised with his siblings in an undisciplined manner, frequently dressing as ragamuffins, to such an extent that his maternal grandmother, Ada Nettleship, attempted to secure and raise them herself. At the age of nine, he went with his brothers to Dane Court preparatory school in Parkstone, Dorset. There he won the prize for the best gentleman in the school and a copy of Jane's Fighting Ships, and it was this, together with a wish to seek a more orderly existence, that inspired him to join the Royal Navy. His father strenuously objected, but his stepmother helped persuade him to support his son. In 1916 he entered the Royal Naval College, Osborne on the Isle of Wight, at the age of thirteen. He transferred to the Royal Naval College, Dartmouth in 1917 and passed out eighty-third of a hundred in 1920. John is remembered at Dartmouth by the naming of the college's theatre and lecture hall, the Caspar John Hall.

== Early years in the Royal Navy ==
Promoted to midshipman on 15 January 1921, John was posted to battleship HMS Centurion in the Mediterranean Fleet in February 1921 and then to the flagship of that fleet, HMS Iron Duke, in April 1922. He transferred to the destroyer HMS Spear in August 1922 and took part in operations during the Chanak Crisis later that year. He was promoted to sub-lieutenant on 30 January 1924. It was at this time that the future of naval aviation was being debated; the issue caught his imagination and during his qualifying exams at the RAF Flying Training School at Netheravon in 1925 (he gained first class certificates in gunnery and torpedo), he applied to train as a pilot in the Fleet Air Arm, then under the dual administration of the navy and Royal Air Force. Promoted to lieutenant on 30 August 1925, he gained his 'wings' in 1926 and from then on committed himself to the Fleet Air Arm, being attached to the Royal Air Force for a period of four years as a flying officer. In April 1926 he was posted to RAF Leuchars in Scotland.

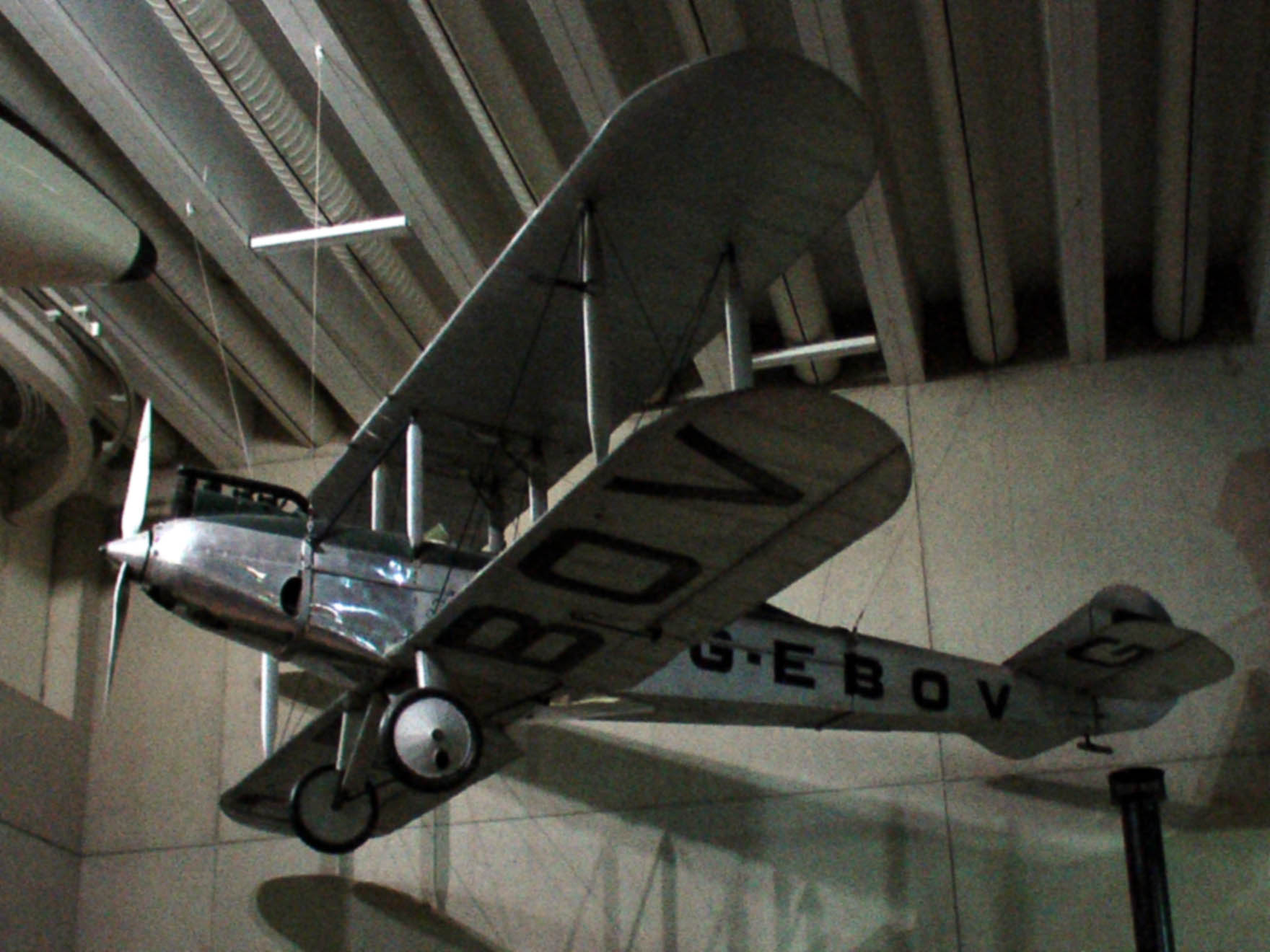
An Avro Avian, the aircraft type in which John took part in three King's Cup Races

In December 1926, John joined the aircraft carrier HMS Hermes for flying duties on the China station during the conflict between the communists and Chiang Kai-shek's nationalist armies. On returning from China he bought his own aeroplane, an open cockpit Avro Avian and took part in three Royal Aero Club King's Cup Races. He was posted to the aircraft carrier HMS Furious in the Atlantic Fleet in April 1930, the battleship HMS Malaya in the Atlantic Fleet in January 1931 and then the cruiser HMS Exeter in the Home Fleet in December 1931.

Promoted to lieutenant commander on 30 August 1933, John joined the battlecruiser HMS Renown in October 1933 and transferred to the aircraft carrier HMS Courageous as Staff Officer (Operations) for the Home Fleet in August 1934. During the Second Italo-Abyssinian War, he spent much of 1936 based in the western desert outside Alexandria. Promoted to commander on 31 December 1936, he was appointed to the Admiralty's naval air division, where he was involved in discussions about the transfer of the Fleet Air Arm to the sole control of the Navy. He was posted to the cruiser HMS York on the America and West Indies Station as Second-in-Command in June 1939.

== Second World War ==
John served in the Second World War initially with HMS York, taking part in the Atlantic convoys, participating in the Norwegian campaign and transporting arms around the Cape of Good Hope to Egypt for use in the western desert campaign. He was mentioned in despatches on 11 March 1941. Promoted to captain on 30 June 1941, he became Director-General of Naval Aircraft Production at the Ministry of Aircraft Production in summer 1941 and then naval air attaché at the British embassy in Washington, D.C., from March 1943. There he arranged the training of British pilots in Canada and the US and met the Russian aircraft designer Igor Sikorsky, with whom he discussed the introduction of helicopters for the Royal Navy after the War. He was given command of the aircraft carrier HMS Pretoria Castle in August 1944 and of the brand-new light carrier HMS Ocean in June 1945.

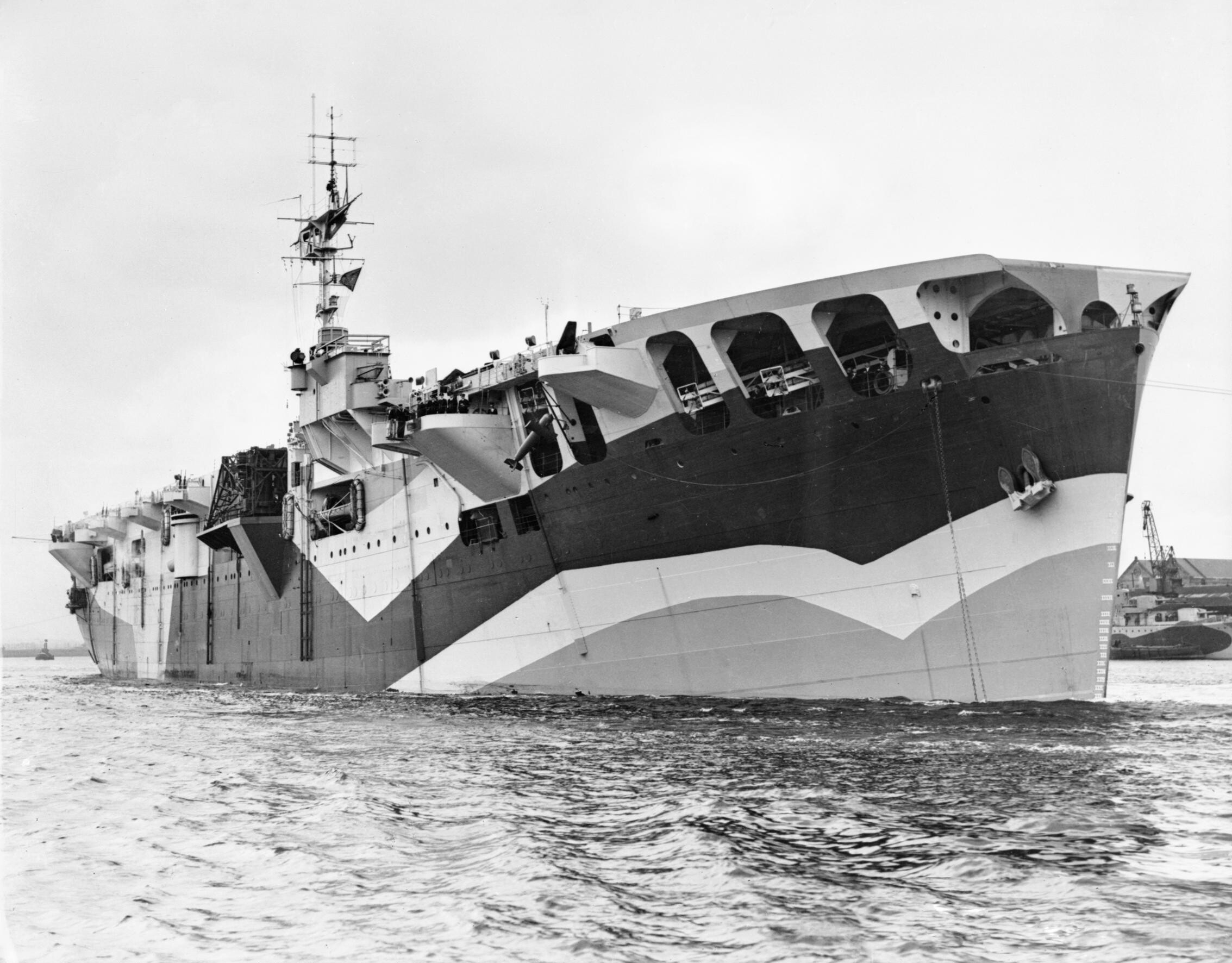
The aircraft carrier HMS Pretoria Castle which John commanded towards the end of the Second World War

== Post-war career ==
After attending the Imperial Defence College in 1947, John was given command of the Royal Naval Air Station Lossiemouth in January 1948. He then returned to the Admiralty, first as Deputy Chief of Naval Air Equipment and then as Director of Air Organization and Training. He was appointed a Naval Aide-de-Camp to the King on 7 July 1950 and promoted to rear admiral on 8 January 1951 on appointment as Commander of the 3rd Aircraft Carrier Squadron, later renamed the Heavy Squadron, Home Fleet. Appointed a Companion of the Order of the Bath in the 1952 Birthday Honours, he was posted to the Ministry of Supply as Deputy Controller of Aircraft that year and, having been promoted to vice admiral on 30 March 1954, he became Flag Officer, Air (Home) at Lee-on-Solent in June 1955. He was advanced to Knight Commander of the Order of the Bath in the 1956 Birthday Honours, promoted to full admiral on 10 January 1957, and became Vice Chief of the Naval Staff in May 1957.

John became First Sea Lord and Chief of the Naval Staff in May 1960. He was advanced to Knight Grand Cross of the Order of the Bath in the 1960 Birthday Honours. As First Sea Lord he was primarily concerned with plans for the building of the CVA-01 aircraft carriers (which were eventually cancelled in 1966). During his tenure as First Sea Lord, he provided an introduction to all episodes of the ATV series ‘War at Sea’. He was promoted to Admiral of the Fleet on 23 May 1962 and retired in August 1963.

== Later career ==
In retirement, John took several civilian positions including chairman of the Housing Corporation from 1964 to 1968 and membership of the Security Commission from 1964 to 1973. He was also a member of the Plowden Committee on primary education, a member of the Templer Committee on rationalisation of air power, chairman of the Star and Garter Home for disabled servicemen, chairman of the Back Pain Association and chairman of the tri-service Milocarian Club. He was briefly picked by the Industrial Society to be the public figurehead for the "I'm Backing Britain" campaign in 1968. He suffered from vascular disease and had both legs amputated in 1978. He lived with his wife in Mousehole in Cornwall and died of pneumonia at Hayle in Cornwall on 11 July 1984.

== Family ==
In 1944 he married Mary Vanderpump: they had two daughters and one son.

Through his father, Gwen John was John's aunt, his half-sisters were Amaryllis Fleming, Gwyneth Johnstone and Vivien John, and Tristan de Vere Cole, John's only living half-brother, is a retired television director. Johnstone and Vivien were also artists in their own right.

== Sources ==
- Heathcote, Tony (2002). The British Admirals of the Fleet 1734–1995. Pen & Sword Ltd. ISBN 0-85052-835-6.
- Nicholson, Virginia (2003). Among the Bohemians. Penguin. ISBN 0-06-054845-2.

Military offices
Preceded by Sir William Davis	Vice Chief of the Naval Staff; 1957–1960	Succeeded by Sir Walter Couchman
Preceded by Sir Charles Lambe	First Sea Lord; 1960–1963	Succeeded by Sir David Luce
Honorary titles
Preceded by Sir William Davis	First and Principal Naval Aide-de-Camp; 1960–1962	Succeeded by Sir Wilfrid Woods
