= Françoise-Apolline Merlin =

French Dominican religious sister

Servant of God Françoise-Apolline Merlin OP
- Born: 19 April 1803; Villeneuve-sur-Yonne, Yonne, France
- Died: 29 October 1878 (aged 75); Villeneuve-sur-Lot, Lot-et-Garonne, France

Françoise-Apolline Merlin (religious name Saint-Pierre; 19 April 1803 – 29 October 1878) was a French religious sister and mother general of the Dominican Sisters of Charity of the Presentation of the Blessed Virgin from 1843 until 1858. Her cause for beatification has been initiated in 2008.

== Biography ==
=== Early life ===
Françoise-Apolline was born on 9 April 1803 in the town of Villeneuve-sur-Yonne to Pierre Merlin and Anne Accaut. At the age of 10, her parents both died and her godfather, Abbé Pierret, a priest, served as her guardian and welcomed her and her siblings to his parish house. Growing up, she earned an excellent education and piety through the influence of his godfather.

=== Religious life ===
When Merlin's oldest sister entered the Dominican Sisters of Charity of the Presentation of the Blessed Virgin in Tours, Françoise-Apolline entered the same congregation as soon as she reached the age of 15. She received the religious habit and made her vows under Adélaïde Combier, taking the name Saint-Pierre. As a religious sister, she stood out for her intelligence and missionary passion, starting her ministry at the local hospitals in Amboise and Saint-Benoît-sur-Loire. In serving the patients, she was remembered as "being open, simple, equanimous, self-sacrificing, mature sister; friendly and jovial".

At the age of 40, Merlin was elected the mother general of the expanding congregation, and was re-elected on 6 October 1855. She served for 15 years and during her tenure, more than a thousand novices joined the congregation. Also under her leadership, she established a stronger connection between the Order of Preachers and the congregation.

Just before the elections of 1858, a new archbishop was named in Tours who did not know the congregation. Due to gossip of some unsatisfied sisters supported by an influential priest, the bishop called Merlin to his palace and, without the possibility of giving explanations, ordered her not to participate in the next general chapter and to withdraw to a house far from the general government of the congregation. Merlin left Bretèche forever, seeing this as a sacrifice of herself for the Institute. She retired to Villeneuve sur Lot and lived there for twenty years.

== Beatification process ==
On 22 July 2008, the Diocese of Agen opened the cause for the Servant of God Françoise-Apolline Merlin's beatification.

== See also ==
- Marie Poussepin
