= Amaryllis Fleming =

British cellist (1925–1999)

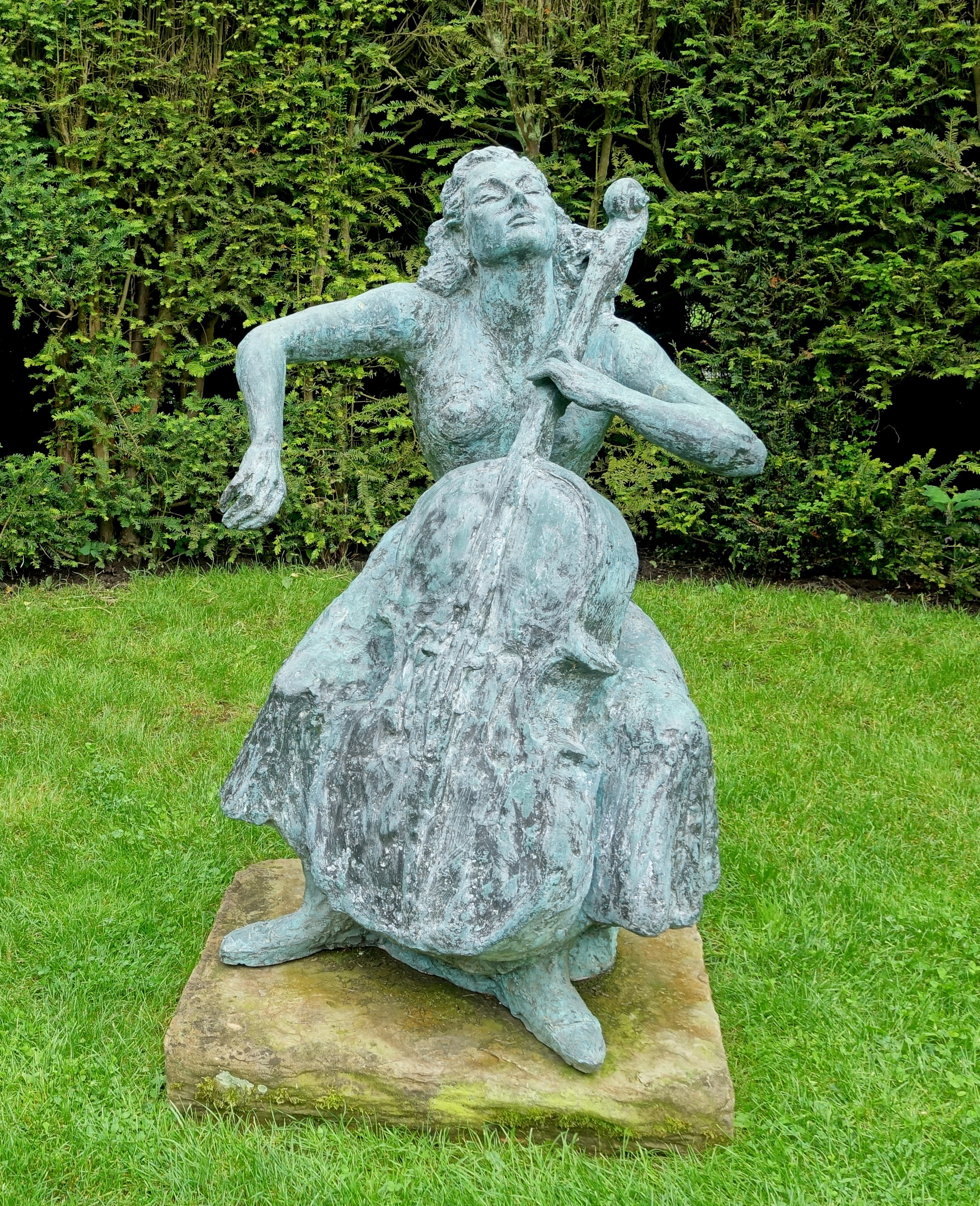
Amaryllis Fleming (sculpture at Renishaw Hall, Derbyshire, England) by Fiore de Henriquez

Amaryllis Marie-Louise Fleming (10 December 1925 – 27 July 1999) was a British cello performer and teacher.

== Early life and education ==
Fleming was born in 1925, reportedly in Switzerland. She was born out of wedlock to the painter Augustus John and his mistress Eve Fleming, who was the mother of the writers Peter Fleming and Ian Fleming by her late husband. Most of her life she was raised as the adopted daughter of Eve Fleming as a pretence to hide the circumstances of her birth. The discovery of her true parentage only in 1949 when she was in her twenties "had a traumatic effect". Fleming was thus a niece to John's sister, artist Gwen John and aunt to actress Lucy Fleming. Her paternal half-siblings included Admiral of the Fleet and First Sea Lord Sir Caspar John, Vivien John, Tristan de Vere Cole and Gwyneth Johnstone. Through Peter Fleming's marriage in 1935 she became the sister-in-law of the actress Celia Johnson.

She went away to school at Downe House in Berkshire, but went to London every three weeks for cello lessons with John Snowden. In 1943 she won a scholarship to study full-time with Ivor James at the Royal College of Music. She later studied at times under Gaspar Cassadó, Enrico Mainardi, Pablo Casals, Guilhermina Suggia and Pierre Fournier.

== Career ==
She established herself as a performer throughout the 1950s, winning the Queen's Prize in 1952, making her debut the following year at The Proms, the annual classical music series at London's Royal Albert Hall, and playing with notable musicians throughout Europe.

Her career was overshadowed by the rise of Jacqueline du Pré in the 1960s, and she concentrated on chamber music, being especially known for the Fleming Trio with the pianist Bernard Roberts and the violinist Manoug Parikian.

She also became a pioneer of baroque cello music and "ground-breakingly, she became the first person this century to play Bach's Sixth suite in the manner its composer had intended", that is, using a cello with a fifth string. At times she owned cellos by Amati, Guarneri and Stradivari.

She also made an appearance in the 1969 film Connecting Rooms as the arms and fingers of Bette Davis, who portrayed a cellist in the film.

== Later life and reputation ==
Her playing career ended in 1993 following a stroke, but she continued to teach at the Royal College of Music and Wells Cathedral School. Her notable pupils include Raphael Wallfisch.

She died unmarried in 1999, peacefully in a hospital at the age of 73. The Times reported that "she never became complacent. She sought out the best teachers in Europe and willingly experimented with many techniques, including practising naked in front of the mirror."

Her half-brother Ian Fleming, in one of his James Bond short stories "The Living Daylights", has Bond musing about a cellist he observes from his sniper's position: "There was something almost indecent in the idea of that bulbous, ungainly instrument between her splayed thighs. Of course Suggia had managed to look elegant, and so did that girl Amaryllis somebody. But they should invent a way for women to play the damned thing side-saddle."

In March 2009 the concert hall of the Royal College of Music, following refurbishment, was renamed the "Amaryllis Fleming Concert Hall" in her honour.
