= Vase of Flowers =

Painting by Gwen John

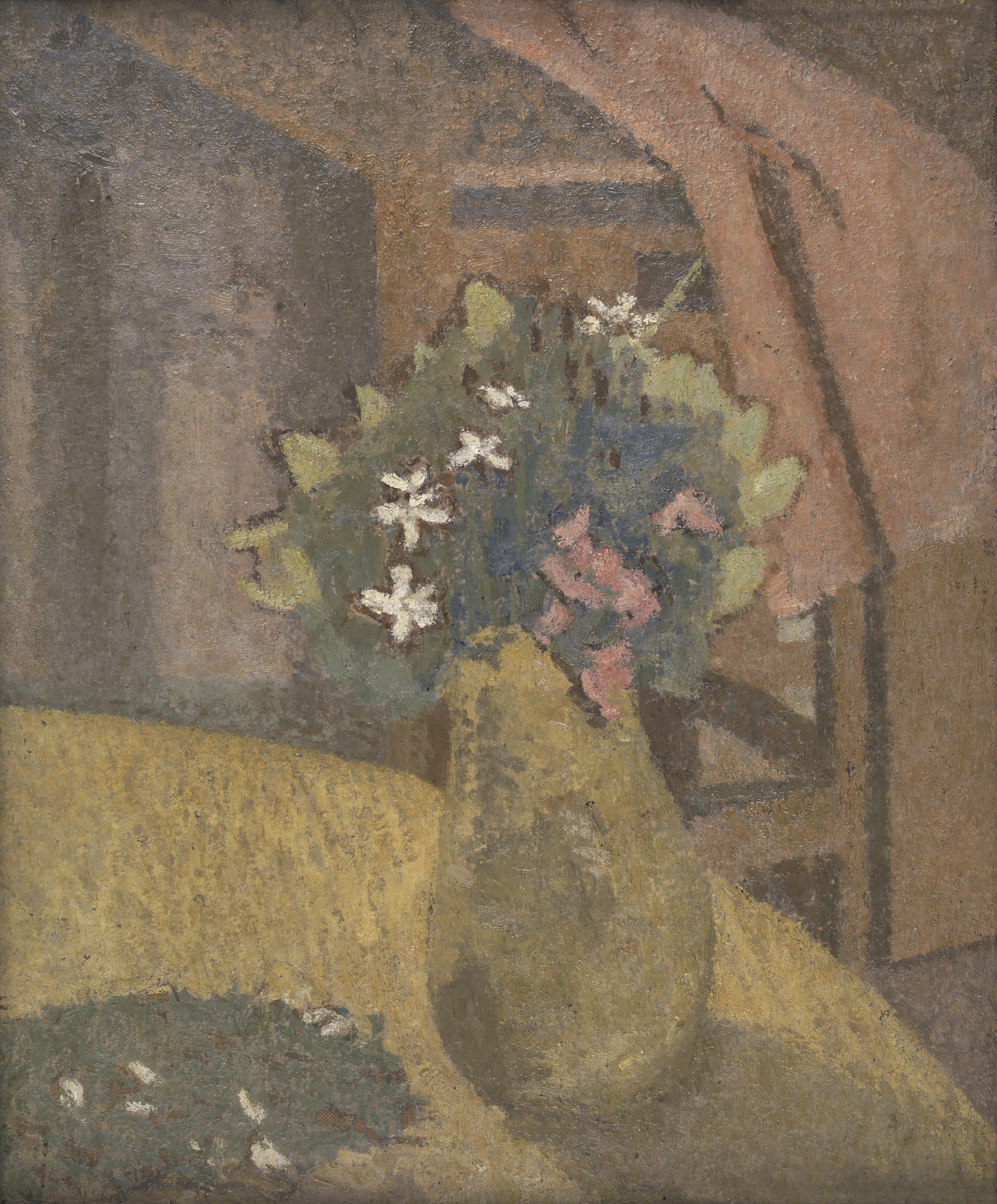
- Artist: Gwen John
- Year: c. late 1910s
- Medium: Oil on board
- Dimensions: 40 cm × 122 cm (16 in × 48 in)
- Location: National Library of Wales; Aberystwyth

Vase of Flowers is an oil painting by the Welsh artist Gwen John, from the late 1910s. it is held in the National Library of Wales, in Aberystwyth.

== Description and history ==
The undated work was painted in the early part of the 20th century. It was donated to the National Library of Wales by the Contemporary Art Society for Wales in 1957.

The subject of the painting is a vase of pink and white flowers on a wooden table with a few white petals falling onto the table. A pink cloth is draped over a table in the background. It is an oil on board painting using the style of dry painting with an impasto brush. It may have been painted in her lounge.

== Analysis ==
Gwen John's biographer Cecily Langdale says the painting probably dates from the late 1910s. A similar, earlier painting by John called Flowers is now held by Manchester Art Gallery.

John's biographer Mary Taubman describes this painting as a "classical and conceptual image and has the appearance of being a considered and reflective development on the original".

== Europeana 280 ==
In April 2016, the painting was selected as one of Wales' ten iconic paintings as part of the Europeana art project.
