= Gwyneth Johnstone =

English painter (1915–2010)

- Born: 18 June 1915; Coltishall, Norfolk, England
- Died: 8 December 2010 (aged 95); Coltishall, Norfolk, England
- Education: Slade School of Fine Art
- Occupation: Painter
- Father: Augustus John

Gwyneth Johnstone (18 June 1915 – 8 December 2010) was an English painter who worked in oil and created landscapes containing individuals in modern landscapes starting from the 1950s. Born as the illegitimate daughter to the musician Nora Brownsford and the artist Augustus John, she enrolled at the Slade School of Fine Art and later the Académie de la Grande Chaumière. Johnstone's work was exhibited in art galleries across the United Kingdom and abroad from the 1960s to the late 2000s.

== Biography ==
Gwyneth Johnstone was born on 18 June 1915 in the Norfolk village of Coltishall; she always concealed her actual birth date. Johnstone was the illegitimate daughter of the musician Nora Brownsford and the artist Augustus John. Her mother gave her daughter the allusive surname of Johnstone from a tutor at Alderney and raised her with a distance relationship with her father in Norwich and London. Johnstone was resented by her half-sisters and was ridiculed by society for being an illegitimate child. She was educated at the Saint Felix School in Southwold, where she saw the paintings of Christopher Wood and other modernists of the era, which were purchased by Lucy Mary Silcox, the school's headteacher.

From March 1933 to June 1938, Johnstone enrolled at the Slade School of Fine Art in London, where she struggled early on. There, established life long friendships with fellow artists Mary Fedden and Virginia Parsons. Her final year at the art school saw her study stage and decorative painting. Afterwards Johnstone was taught academicised cubism by the painter André Lhote at the Académie de la Grande Chaumière, and for a brief period in the early 1950s, she took life classes with the surrealist artist Cecil Collins at the Central School of Arts and Crafts.

Johnstone's work appeared in several groups, including Young Contemporaries, The London Group and the Women's International Art Club, the latter of which she became a vice-president of. Her first solo show was at the Woodstock Gallery in 1960, which she followed with a series of exhibitions at the Portal Gallery, and she went on to showcase her work abroad. According to Tanya Herrod of The Guardian, "her art must have appeared wildly out of step with contemporary practice", but her work had a revival with multiple solo exhibitions from the 1980s on, including the New Grafton Art Gallery in 1983, Sally Hunter & Patrick Seale Fine Art two years later, the Michael Parkin Fine Art in 1993 and the School House Gallery at Wighton near Wells-next-the-Sea in 2007. Johnstone died in Colitishall on 8 December 2010.

== Personal life ==
Johnstone was unmarried but had a relationship with a pianist, Francis Davies, from the 1940s until his death in 2008. She owned homes in southernmost France and later the hills of Benidorm.

Through her father, Gwen John was her aunt, and Johnstone's half-siblings were cellist Amaryllis Fleming, Caspar John, and fellow artist Vivien John. Her only living half-brother is television director Tristan de Vere Cole. Only Caspar was born from his father's marriage; he was a Royal Navy admiral and later First Sea Lord.

== Analysis ==
Johnson was influenced by the Virgilian woodcuts of William Blake, the intense landscapes of Shoreman's primitives and chapbooks. She used oil in her paintings, and focused on themes containing "shepherds, fishermen and lovers at ease in wild Mediterranean landscapes", and called her work, "romantic modern landscapes". In the 1977 book Twentieth Century British Naïve and Primitive Artists, Eric Lister and Sheldon Williams wrote of Johnstone's paintings: "Despite the individuality of her work, there is more than a smattering of impressionism in some of the effects she invokes", which give the paintings "a paradoxical sophistication." The two noted the individuals, landscapes, the woods and cottages seen in Johnstone's work had "a strong lyrical character".
