= Vivien John =

British artist

- Born: 8 March 1915; Dorset, England
- Died: 20 May 1994 (aged 79); London, England
- Education: Slade School of Fine Art; Académie de la Grande Chaumière; Chelsea School of Art
- Known for: Painting
- Spouse: John White
- Parent(s): Augustus John; Dorelia McNeill
- Family: Gwen John (aunt); Amaryllis Fleming; Caspar John; Gwyneth Johnstone; Tristan de Vere Cole (half-siblings)

Vivien John (8 March 1915 – 20 May 1994) was a British painter.

== Biography ==
Vivien John was born at Alderney Manor in Dorset, the daughter of Dorelia McNeill and the artist Augustus John; she was the youngest of their four children together. After a Bohemian upbringing in Dorset, Vivien John attended the Slade School of Fine Art from 1932 to 1934 and had her first solo exhibition at the Cooling Gallery in London during 1935 before studying with the Euston Road School of artists in the late 1930s. Travelling with her father, she visited Italy, France and then Kingston in Jamaica where a joint exhibition of their paintings was held. John also spent time in Paris with her aunt, the artist Gwen John, during this period. During the Second World War, Vivien John served as a nurse with the Red Cross. As the war came to an end, she took art lessons in Paris at the Académie de la Grande Chaumière before returning to London to study at the Chelsea School of Art in 1945.

After the War, John married a haematologist, Dr John White, and the couple spent 1947 in Moscow and periods of the 1960s in both Malaysia and Papua New Guinea. She continued to paint and had a number of exhibitions, including a 1967 show at the Walker Art Gallery in Liverpool and a solo exhibition at the Upper Grosvenor Galleries in 1971. Her work featured in group exhibitions at the Royal Academy, the London Group and with the Women's International Art Club. Examples of John's work was included in the 1987 Slade Contemporaries exhibition and a memorial exhibition was held in 1995.

Fellow artist Gwen John was her aunt, and some of Vivien's half-siblings were cellist Amaryllis Fleming, Sir Caspar John and another artist Gwyneth Johnstone; only Sir Caspar was born from Augustus's only marriage and he became a prominent Royal Navy admiral and later First Sea Lord. Her only living half-brother is retired television director Tristan de Vere Cole (b. 1935). Cole, Fleming, and Johnstone were born from Augustus's other relationships.
