= Marie Poussepin =

Blessed Marie Poussepin
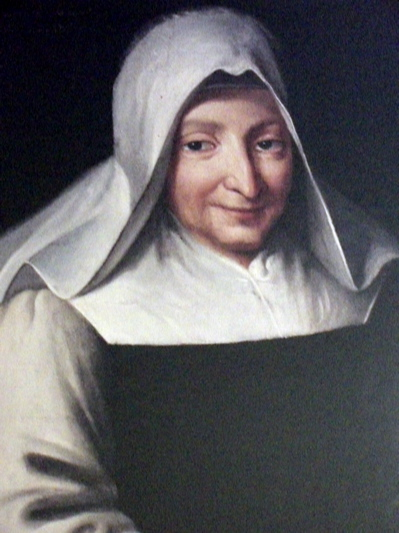
- 18th century portrait
- Born: 14 October 1653; Dourdan, France
- Died: 24 January 1744 (aged 90); Sainville, France
- Venerated in: Roman Catholic Church
- Beatified: November 20, 1994 by John Paul II
- Feast: 24 January

Marie Poussepin (14 October 1653 – 24 January 1744) was a French Dominican who founded the congregation of the Dominican Sisters of Charity of the Presentation.

== Biography ==
Poussepin was born in 1653 in Dourdan to a well-to-do family who ran a workshop for the manufacture of hand-knitted silk hosiery. Her father, Claude Poussepin, was the Syndic of Dourdan; his wife, Julienne Fourrier, served as treasurer of the local Confraternity of Charity. From an early age, Poussepin accompanied her mother on visits to the sick.

After the death of her mother, Poussepin took over responsibility for the home and care of her younger brother. Financial reverses undermined her father's health. When he died in 1683, she took over the family business. Recognizing the competition from emerging industrialization, she introduced weaving looms and switched from silk to the more profitable wool. She provided training and employment for teenage apprentices from modest means and waived the customary apprentice fee.

In 1691, she joined the Third Order of Saint Dominic, caring for the poor and ill, and handed the family business over to her brother, Claude. In 1696 she decided to form a Community "to instruct the children and to serve the sick poor of the country side" and moved to Sainville, a parish experiencing hunger, premature deaths produced by malnutrition, and epidemics. In 1697, she founded a second house in Janville, Eure-et-Loir. Nineteen houses of the "Dominican Sisters of Charity" were founded in the region around Chartres.

In 1738, the community's Rule was approved by Charles-François des Montiers de Mérinville, Bishop of Chartres. However, they were not allowed to identify as Dominicans since at that time neither the bishop nor the Master of the Order could find provision for a congregation of Dominican women outside the cloister. The decision grieved Poussepin.

The congregation became known instead as the "Jacobines". As leader of the Jacobines, Poussepin opened elementary schools and reformed healthcare in rural France.

Despite striving for formal acceptance and recognition by the Dominican order, it did not come during her lifetime; while on her deathbed in 1744, Poussepin was instructed that if she continued pressing the issue the small amount of recognition the Jacobines had obtained would be withdrawn. Finally, in 1897, the Jacobines were formally recognised, and became named the "Dominican Sisters of Charity of the Presentation of the Most Blessed Virgin Mary", celebrating the Presentation of Mary at the Temple in Jerusalem.

== Legacy ==
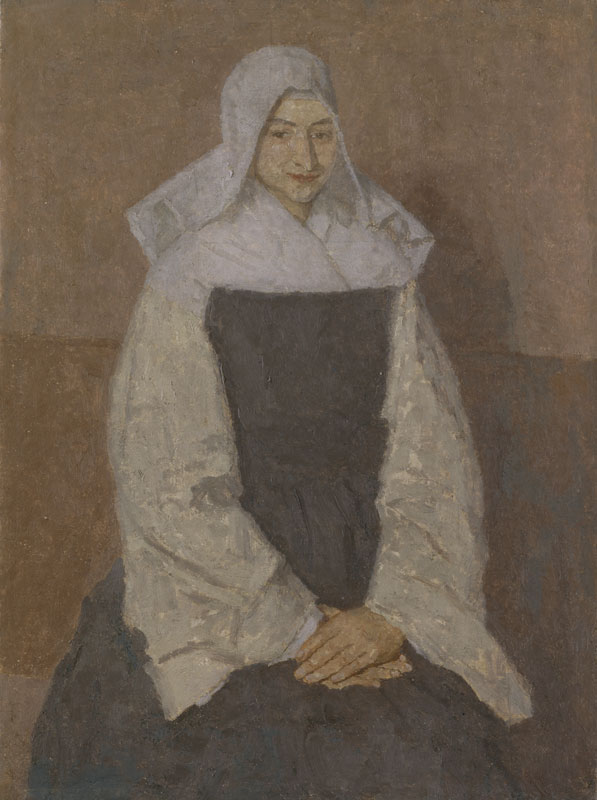
Portrait by Gwen John, painted c. 1915-1920

Several paintings of Poussepin were made by the Welsh artist Gwen John (1876–1939), for various branches of the Dominican order.

Poussepin's spiritual writings were approved by theologians on 13 July 1919, and her cause was formally opened on 27 June 1923, granting her the title of Servant of God. On 20 November 1994 Poussepin was beatified by Pope John Paul II.

== See also ==
- Françoise-Apolline Merlin
