= Ada Nettleship =

British dressmaker (1856–1932)

- Born: Adaline Cort Hinton; 1856
- Died: 19 December 1932 (aged 75–76); London, UK
- Occupation: Dress maker costume designer businesswoman
- Spouse: John Trivett Nettleship
- Children: Ida, Ethel, and Ursula Nettleship

Ada Nettleship (born Adaline Cort Hinton; 1856 – 19 December 1932) was a British dressmaker and costume designer known for working at the forefront of the Aesthetic dress style and the rational dress movement.

== Personal life ==
Adaline Cort Hinton was born in either Whitechapel, London or Middlesex, the daughter of surgeon James Hinton and Margaret (Haddon) Hinton. Her siblings included the mathematician Charles Howard Hinton and they grew up in Brighton.

She married the British painter John Trivett Nettleship, with whom she had three children: Ida, Ethel and Ursula. Their oldest daughter, Ida, became an artist and the first wife of British painter Augustus John. Her grandchildren included Caspar John who became First Sea Lord.

== Career ==
Nettleship established herself as a dressmaker in London, expanding from an earlier specialisation in embroidery.

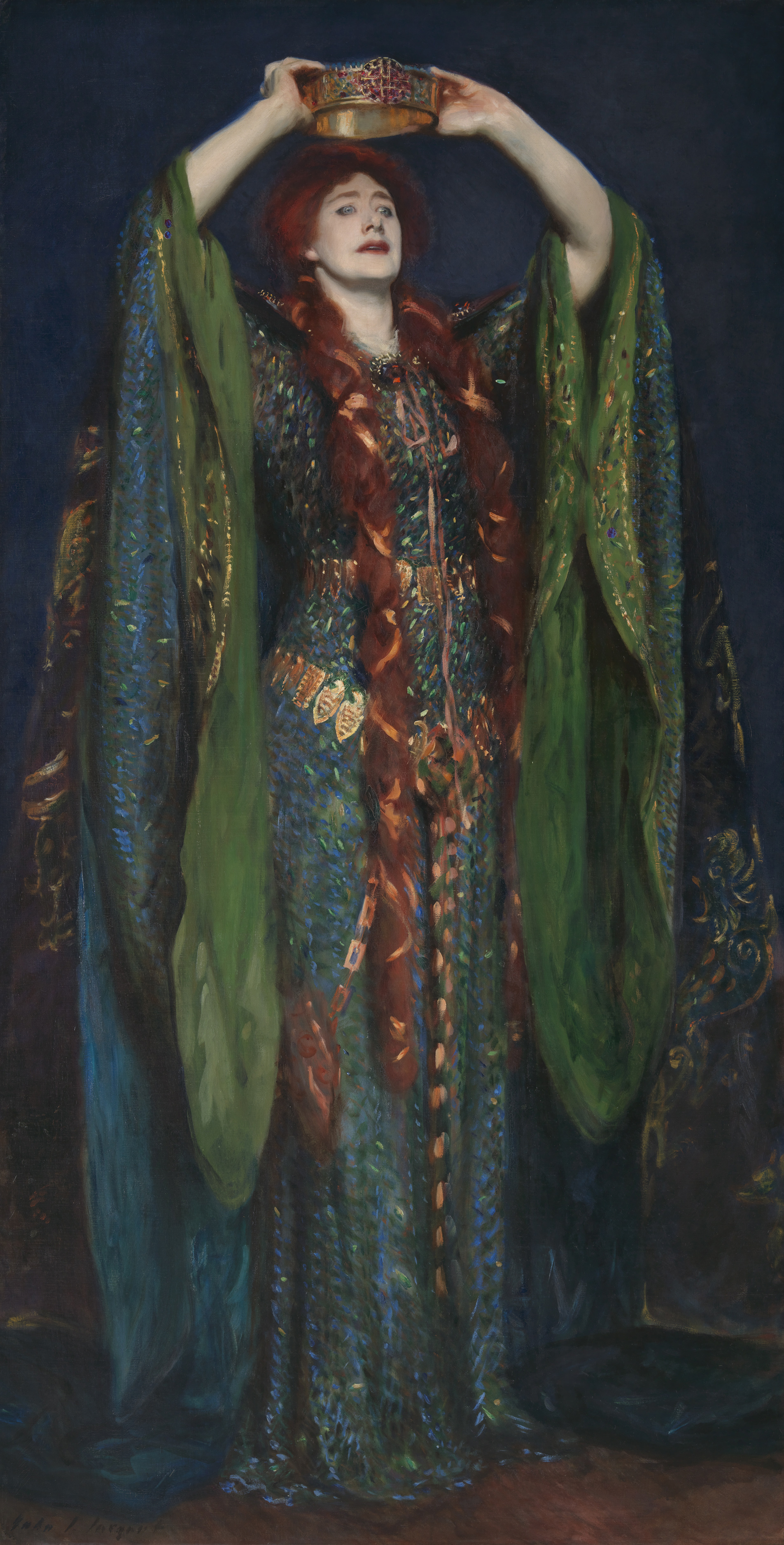
Ellen Terry as Lady Macbeth, by John Singer Sargent, 1889. Terry is wearing the Carr-Nettleship iridescent dress.

Notable clients included the soprano Marie Tempest, and the actors Ellen Terry, Winifred Emery, Sarah Bernhardt, and Mrs Patrick Campbell.

In 1884, she made Constance Lloyd's wedding dress for her marriage to Oscar Wilde. She made other dresses for Lloyd as well that helped to set the new Aestheticist fashion for looser, more flowing garments with theatrical touches such as lace, embroidery, or brocade.

One of Nettleship's most well-known works is a theatrical costume made for Ellen Terry in 1888 when she was playing the role of Lady Macbeth. Designed by Alice Comyns Carr and crocheted by Nettleship to simulate a soft chain mail, the dress was oversewn with more than 1000 beetle wings to create an iridescent effect. The idea for this costume probably came from two earlier Nettleship designs: an 1886 dress and an 1887 hat for Constance Lloyd that were oversewn with iridescent green beetle wings. The American artist John Singer Sargent painted Terry in the Carr-Nettleship dress in 1889. The restored costume has previously been displayed in Terry's home, Smallhythe Place, near Tenterden in Kent, and features alongside the Sargent painting in the Sargent and Fashion exhibition at Tate Britain in 2024.

Nettleship collaborated with Carr to make a dress for a production of Henry VIII, and she created a dress for the play Henry of Navarre that Terry complained was almost unbearably heavy due to the use of steel panniers and extensive oversewing with jewels. She also costumed Terry as Cordelia in King Lear (1892), Guinevere in King Arthur (1895), and Imogen in Cymbeline (1896).

== Rational dress ==
Nettleship's adventurous designs in the Aesthetic dress style — especially those for Lloyd — were admired by the London avant-garde, and in 1883 her work was included in a landmark exhibition by the Rational Dress Society.

Among the items she presented was a "Ladies Walking Costume" that included trousers, a feature that allowed for radical shortening of the overskirt, thereby reducing the weight of the entire ensemble. This was more than two decades before European women started wearing trousers in public. Nettleship's designs were generally regarded as too eccentric by the wider public and often subjected to ridicule in the press and in private letters.

== Death ==
Ada Nettleship died on 19 December 1932 at her home 45 Weymouth Street, London.
