= Girl with a Cat =

Painting by Gwen John

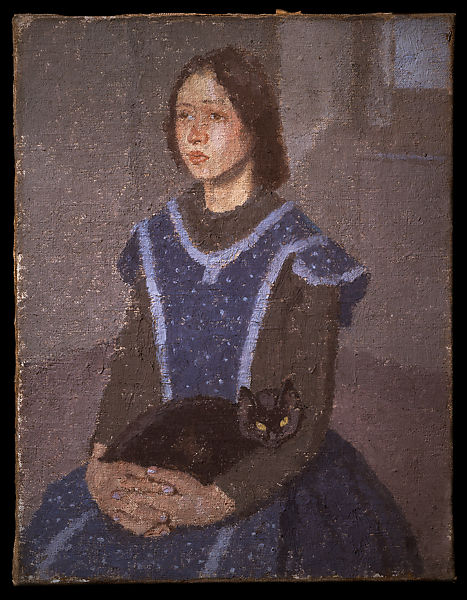
- Artist: Gwen John
- Year: 1918–1922
- Medium: oil paint, canvas
- Dimensions: 33.7 cm (13.3 in) × 26.7 cm (10.5 in)
- Location: Metropolitan Museum of Art
- Accession no.: 1976.201.25
- Identifiers: The Met object ID: 481489

Girl with a Cat is an oil on canvas portrait painting by the Welsh artist Gwen John, from c. 1918–1922. It is held in the collection of the Metropolitan Museum of Art, in New York.

== Early history and creation ==
The work was painted before autumn 1921, likely during the late 1910s to early 1920s.

== Description ==
The work depicts a seated girl holding a black house cat with a window behind her. The figure wears a blue apron with white polka dots.

== Exhibition history ==
Dates	Gallery	City	Show
Sep 12 – Nov 3, 1985	Barbican Art Gallery	London	Gwen John: An Interior Life, no. 28 (as "Girl with Cat")
Nov 28 – Jan 26, 1985–86	Manchester City Art Gallery	Manchester	Gwen John: An Interior Life, no. 28
Feb 26 – April 20, 1986	Yale Center for British Art	New Haven	Gwen John: An Interior Life, no. 28
