= David Boyd Haycock =

British writer, curator and lecturer (born 1968)

David Boyd Haycock (born 1968 in Banbury, Oxfordshire) is a British writer, curator and lecturer. He read Modern History at St John's College, Oxford, and later gained an MA in the History of Art from the University of Sussex and a PhD in history from Birkbeck College, London. He is the author of a number of books, including William Stukeley: Science, Archaeology and Religion in Eighteenth Century England (2002) Paul Nash (2002, 2nd edition 2016), Mortal Coil: A Short History of Living Longer (2008) and A Crisis of Brilliance: Five Young British Artists and the Great War (2009), a group biography of the artists Paul Nash, Stanley Spencer, Mark Gertler, Dora Carrington and C. R. W. Nevinson, all of whom were students together at the Slade School of Art in London; and I Am Spain: The Spanish Civil War and the Men and Women who went to Fight Fascism (2012).

A Crisis of Brilliance was nominated in the "Best Non-Fiction Book" category at the 2010 Writers' Guild of Great Britain awards. An exhibition based on the book was held at Dulwich Picture Gallery in the summer of 2013.

He lives in Oxford.
