= John Trivett Nettleship =

British artist (1841–1902)

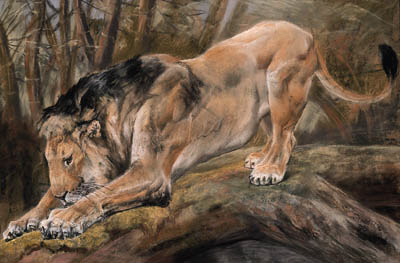
Nettleship's painting A Lion Sharpening its Claws on a Tree, 1894 pastel

John Trivett Nettleship (11 February 1841 – 31 August 1902) was a British artist, known as a painter of animals and in particular lions. He was also an author and book illustrator.

== Life ==
He was born in Kettering, Northamptonshire on 11 February 1841, the second son of Henry John Nettleship, a solicitor there, and brother of Henry Nettleship, Richard Lewis Nettleship, and of Edward Nettleship, the ophthalmic surgeon. His mother was Isabella Ann, daughter of James Hogg, vicar of Geddington and Master of Kettering Grammar School.

Nettleship was for some time a chorister at New College, Oxford. Afterwards he was sent to the cathedral school at Durham, where his brother Henry had preceded him. Having won the English verse prize on the subject of "Venice" in 1856, he was taken away comparatively young, in order to enter his father's office. There he remained for two or three years, finishing his articles in London. Admitted a solicitor and in practice for a brief period, he decided to devote himself to art, and entered himself as a student at Heatherley's and at the Slade School in London, but was largely self-taught.

For twenty-seven years (1874–1901) he exhibited spacious oil pictures of lions, tigers, etc., at the Royal Academy and for most of the period at the Grosvenor Gallery. In 1880 Nettleship was invited to India by the Gaekwar of Baroda, for whom he painted a cheetah hunt as well as an equestrian portrait. In his later years he took to the medium of pastel, and, painting his old subjects on a smaller scale, enjoyed greater popularity.

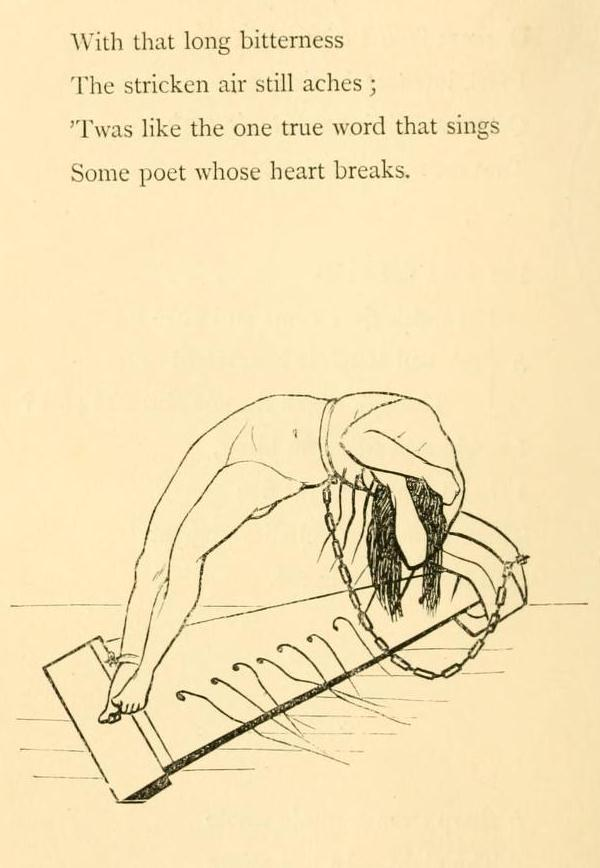
Nettleship's illustration to Arthur W.E. O’Shaughnessy's poem "A Neglected Harp" in Epic of Women (1870)

Nettleship was far more than a painter. His intellectual sympathies were unusually wide. In 1868, when only twenty-seven, he published a volume of Essays on Robert Browning's Poetry, which was probably the first serious study of the poet. It passed through three editions with considerable enlargements. The third edition was titled Robert Browning: Essays and Thoughts (1895). The book brought about an intimate friendship between the poet and his critic. Another book that shows both his mature power of literary expression and his opinions about his own art is George Morland and the Evolution from him of some Later Painters (1898). Here there are touches of self-portraiture.

He was one of The Brotherhood, a group of the 1870s including John Butler Yeats and Edwin John Ellis. They were admirers of William Blake, on friendly terms with the Pre-Raphaelites or at least the Rossetti brothers, and part of the Bedford Park social and artistic group. He created a group of what he called "Blake drawings" exploring the style of the poet-artist. He also made the Blake-influenced illustrations to Arthur O'Shaughnessy's poetry collection Epic of Women and other poems in 1870.

Nettleship died in London on 31 August 1902, and was buried at Kensal Green Cemetery. A memorial tablet in bronze, designed by Sir George Frampton, with the aid of two locally born artists, Sir Alfred East and Thomas Cooper Gotch, was placed in the parish church at Kettering.

== Writing ==
He wrote in Essays on Robert Browning's poetry (1868) the first major work of criticism on Browning, whose mid-century reputation was in the doldrums. This brought him Browning's friendship. He was prominent as a founder of the Browning Society. (Note: "A committee was elected, of which Mr. J. T. Nettleship, already well known as a Browning student, was one of the most conspicuous members; and by the end of October a small Society had come into existence, which held its inaugural meeting in the Botanic Theatre of University College" (Leighton 2005, p. 327)) He wrote also a biography of the artist George Morland, George Morland and the Evolution from him of some Later Painters (1898).

== Family ==
In 1876, he married Ada Cort Hinton, a fashion designer and the daughter of James Hinton. She survived him with three daughters, the eldest of whom, Ida, was an artist and the first wife of the artist Augustus John.

== Books ==
- Essays on Robert Browning's poetry. London: Macmillan. 1868 – via Internet Archive.
- George Morland: and the evolution from him of some later painters. London: Seeley. 1898 – via Internet Archive.

== Sources ==
- Foster, R. F. (1998). W. B. Yeats: A Life. Vol. I. p. 12.
- Leighton, Alexandra (2005). Life and Letters of Robert Browning. Cosimo. p. 327. ISBN 978-159605667-1.
- Trodd, Colin (2012). Visions of Blake. Liverpool University Press.

Attribution

- This article incorporates text from a publication now in the public domain: Cotton, James Sutherland (1912). "Nettleship, John Trivett". In Lee, Sidney (ed.). Dictionary of National Biography (2nd supplement). Vol. 3. London: Smith, Elder & Co. pp. 4–5.
