= Gwen John =

Welsh artist (1876–1939)

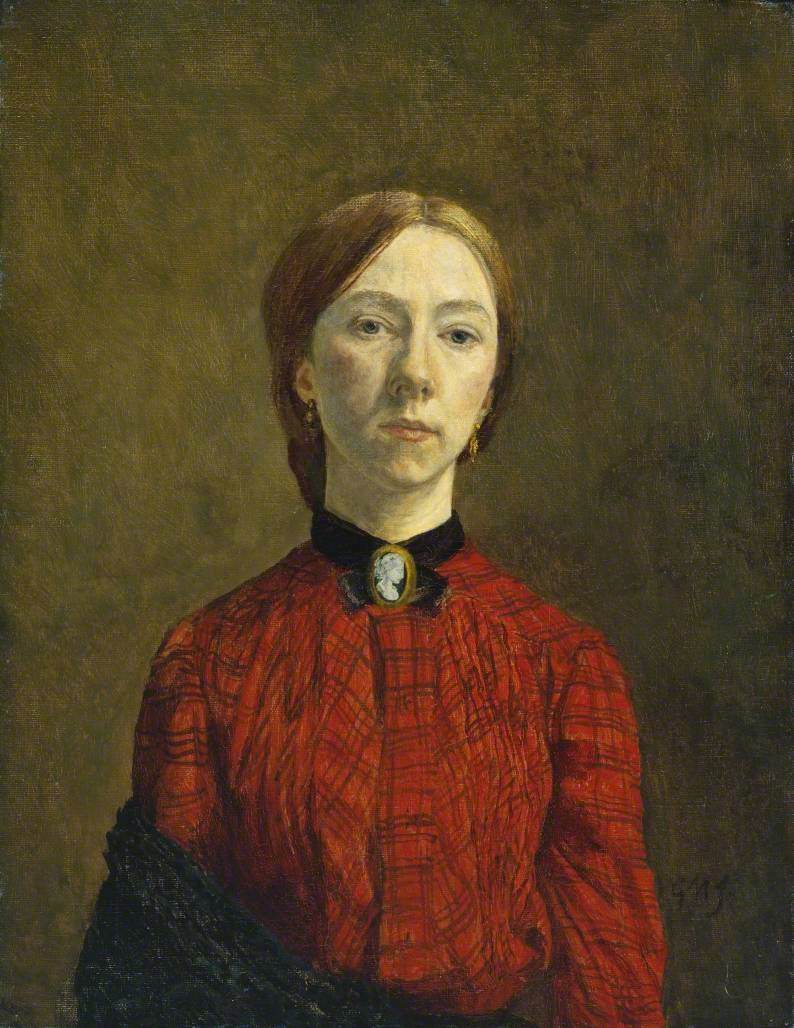
- Self-Portrait (1902)
- Born: Gwendolen Mary John; 22 June 1876; Haverfordwest, Wales
- Died: 18 September 1939 (aged 63); Dieppe, France
- Education: Slade School of Art; Académie Carmen
- Known for: Portraiture, still life
- Family: Augustus John (brother); Caspar John (nephew); Tristan de Vere Cole (nephew); Amaryllis Fleming (niece); Gwyneth Johnstone (niece); Vivien John (niece)
- Patrons: John Quinn

Gwendolen "Gwen" Mary John (22 June 1876 – 18 September 1939) was a Welsh artist who worked in France for most of her career. Her paintings, mainly portraits of anonymous female sitters, are rendered in a range of closely related tones. Although in her lifetime, John's work was overshadowed by that of her brother Augustus and her mentor and lover Auguste Rodin, awareness and esteem for John's artistic contributions has grown considerably since her death.

== Early life ==
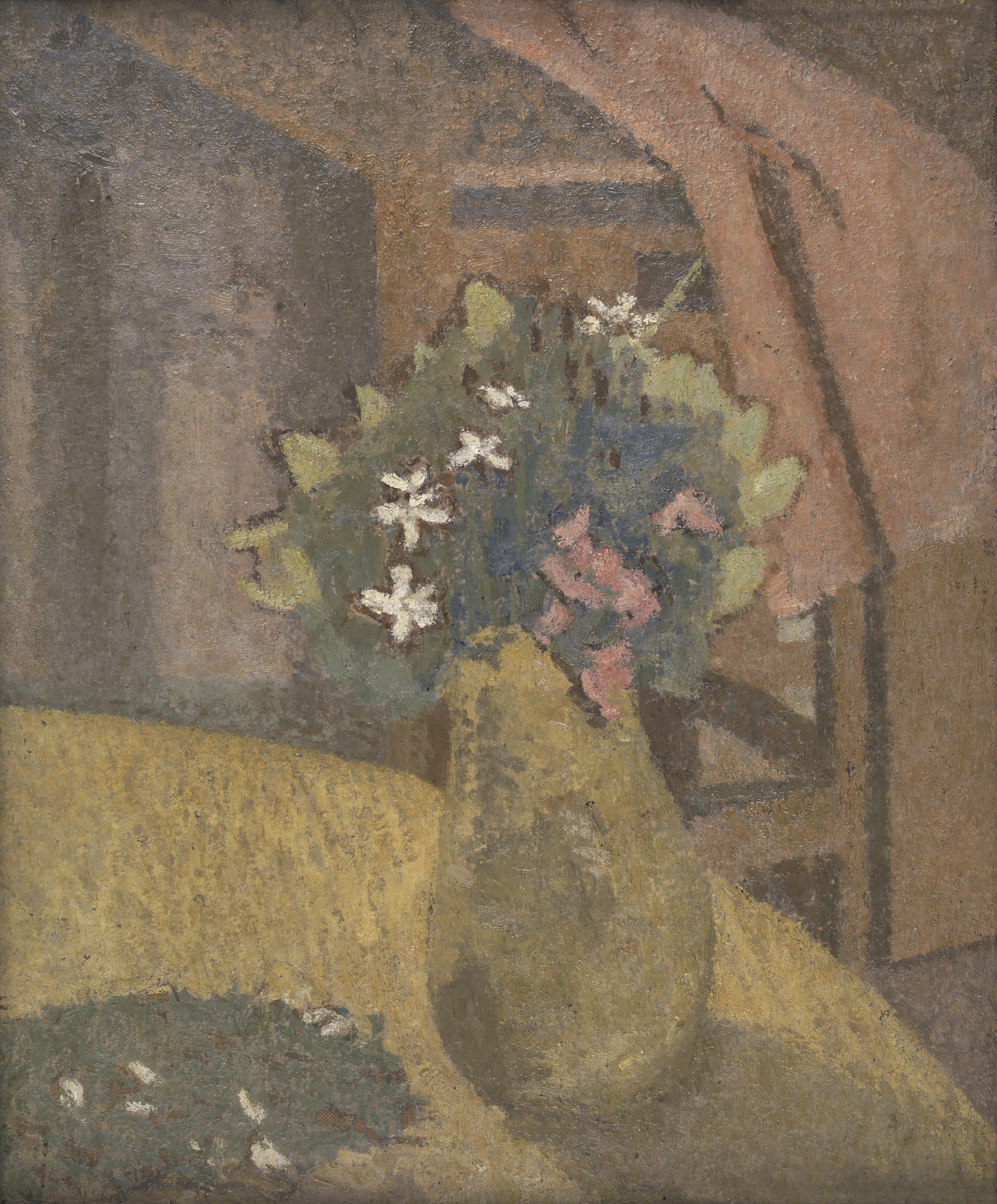
Vase of Flowers (c. 1910s)

Gwen John was born in Haverfordwest, Wales, the second of four children of Edwin William John and his wife Augusta (née Smith, 1848–1884). Augusta came from a long line of Sussex master plumbers. Gwen's elder brother was Thornton John; her younger siblings were Augustus and Winifred. Edwin John was a solicitor whose dour temperament cast a chill over his family, and Augusta was often absent from the children owing to ill health, leaving her two sisters—stern Salvationists—to take her place in the household. Augusta was an amateur watercolour painter, and both parents encouraged the children's interest in literature and art.

Her mother died when Gwen was eight years old. Regarding her mother's death and the loss of her influence, John's brother Augustus later wrote: "My mother would no doubt have been helpful, but she died when I was a small child, after, I fear, a very tearful existence."

Following their mother's premature death in 1884, the family moved to Tenby in Pembrokeshire, Wales, where governesses provided the early education of Gwen and her sister Winifred. The siblings often went to the coast of Tenby to sketch. John said that she would make "rapid drawings of beached gulls, shells and fish on stray pieces of paper, or sometimes in the frontispiece of the book she was reading." Although John painted and drew from an early age, her earliest surviving work was made at age 19.

== Education ==
From 1895 to 1898, John studied at the Slade School of Art, where the programme was modelled after the French atelier method with various levels of student working under a master artist. It was the only art school in the United Kingdom that allowed female students, although there was generally no mixing of men and women on the grounds, in classes, or in corridors. Like her younger brother, Augustus, who was enrolled there starting in 1894, John studied figure drawing under Henry Tonks. During this period, she and Augustus shared living quarters, and further reduced their expenses by subsisting on a diet of nuts and fruit. She developed a close relationship with the woman who would become her brother's wife, Ida Nettleship. At this time, she also had a relationship with another of her brother's friends, Ambrose McEvoy, which turned out to be an unhappy one. Good friends also included Ursula Tyrwhitt and Gwen Salmond. John won the Melvill Nettleship Prize for Figure Composition in her final year at Slade.

Slade students were encouraged to copy the works of old masters in London museums. John's early paintings, such as Portrait of Mrs. Atkinson, Young Woman with a Violin and Interior with Figures, are intimist works painted in a traditional style characterised by subdued colour and transparent glazes. Even as a student, Augustus's brilliant draughtsmanship and personal glamour made him a celebrity, and stood in contrast to Gwen's quieter gifts and reticent demeanour. Augustus greatly admired his sister's work but believed she neglected her health, and he urged her to take a "more athletic attitude to life". She refused his advice, and demonstrated throughout her life a marked disregard for her physical well-being.

In 1898 she made her first visit to Paris with two friends from the Slade, and while there she studied under James McNeill Whistler at his school, Académie Carmen. She returned to London in 1899 and exhibited her work for the first time in 1900, at the New English Art Club (NEAC). With Arthur Ambrose McEvoy becoming engaged to Mary Edwards at the end of 1900, "an awkward period ensued with Gwen living at the McEvoy family home in Bayswater", where "she had continued living", "while Ambrose and Mary moved down to Shrivenham in Oxfordshire" in around 1903.

== France and early career ==
In late 1903, she travelled to France with her friend Dorelia McNeill (who was Augustus John's lover; their daughter, Vivien John, would also become an artist). When she first arrived in France, she lived in poverty, living on a diet of mostly figs and bread. Upon landing in Bordeaux, they set off on a walking tour with their art equipment in hand, intending to reach Rome. Sleeping in fields and living on money earned along the way by selling portrait sketches, they made it as far as Toulouse.

In 1904, the two went to Paris, where John found work as an artist's model, mostly for women artists. In that same year, she began modelling for the sculptor Auguste Rodin, and became his lover after being introduced by Hilda Flodin. Rodin used John as a model for a muse in his unfinished monument to Whistler. Her devotion to Rodin, the most famous artist of his time, who was 35 years older than her, continued unabated for the next ten years, as documented in her thousands of fervent letters to him. John was given to fierce attachments to both men and women that were sometimes disturbing to them, and Rodin, despite his genuine feeling for her, eventually resorted to the use of concièrges and secretaries to keep her at a distance.

During her years in Paris, she met many of the leading artistic personalities of her time, including Matisse, Picasso, Brâncuși, and Rainer Maria Rilke, but the new developments in the art of her time had little effect on her, and she worked in solitude. In 1910, she found living quarters in Meudon, a suburb of Paris where she would remain for the rest of her life. As her affair with Rodin drew to a close, John sought comfort in Roman Catholicism, and around 1913 she was received into the Church. Her notebooks of the period include meditations and prayers; she wrote of her desire to be "God's little artist" and to "become a saint". In an often-quoted letter of c. 1912, she wrote: "As to whether I have anything worth expressing that is apart from the question. I may never have anything to express, except this desire for a more interior life."

Contemporary critics often remarked on the elusive nature of Gwen John's personality; writing in The Sphere in 1952, Sir John Rothenstein described her as inward facing and difficult to grasp, suggesting that her reserved character and withdrawal from artistic fashions contributed to her relative obscurity during her lifetime.

== Career ==
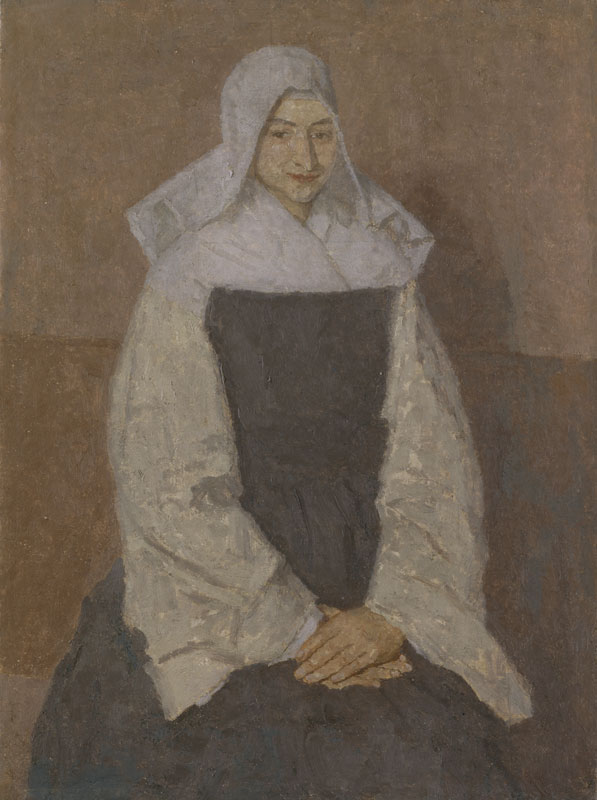
Mère Poussepin, c. late 1910s, Barber Institute, Birmingham

John stopped exhibiting at the NEAC in 1911, but gained an important patron in John Quinn, an American art collector who, from 1910 until his death in 1924, purchased the majority of the works that Gwen John sold. Quinn's support freed John from having to work as a model, and enabled her to devote herself to her work. Although she participated in exhibitions fairly regularly, her perfectionism produced in her a marked ambivalence toward exhibiting. She wrote in 1911: "I paint a good deal, but I don't often get a picture done—that requires, for me, a very long time of a quiet mind, and never to think of exhibitions." In 1913, one of her paintings was included in the seminal Armory Show in New York, which Quinn assisted in organising.

Her attitude towards her work was both self-effacing and confident. After viewing an exhibition of watercolours by Cézanne she remarked: "These are very good, but I prefer my own."

About 1913, as an obligation to the Dominican Sisters of Charity at Meudon, she began a series of painted portraits of Mère Marie Poussepin (1653–1744), the founder of their order. These paintings, based on a prayer card, established a format—the female figure in three-quarter length seated pose—which became characteristic of her mature style. She painted numerous variants on such subjects as Young Woman in a Spotted Blue Dress, Girl Holding a Cat and The Convalescent. The identities of most of her models are unknown.

In Meudon John lived in solitude, except for her cats. In an undated letter, she wrote: "I should like to go and live somewhere where I met nobody I know till I am so strong that people and things could not effect me beyond reason." She wished also to avoid family ties ("I think the family has had its day. We don't go to Heaven in families now but one by one") and her decision to live in France after 1903 may have been the result of her desire to escape the overpowering personality of her famous brother, although, according to the art historian David Fraser Jenkins, "there were few occasions when she did anything against her will, and she was the more ruthless and dominating of the two".

John exhibited in Paris for the first time in 1919 at the Salon d'Automne, and exhibited regularly until the mid-1920s, after which time she became increasingly reclusive and painted less. She had only one solo exhibition in her lifetime, at the New Chenil Galleries in London in 1926. In that same year she purchased a bungalow in Meudon. In December 1926, distraught after the death of her old friend Rilke, she met and sought religious guidance from her neighbour, the neo-Thomist philosopher Jacques Maritain. She also met Maritain's sister-in-law, Véra Oumançoff, with whom she formed her last romantic relationship, which lasted until 1930.

It is not known when Gwen first became involved with the Royal Academy of Arts, London, but before she died, she resigned from her position.

John's last dated work is a drawing of 20 March 1933, and no evidence suggests that she drew or painted during the remainder of her life. On 10 September 1939, she wrote her will and then travelled to Dieppe, where she collapsed and was hospitalised. She died there on 18 September 1939 and was buried in Janval Cemetery. According to Paul Johnson in Art: A New History, "she appears to have starved to death".

== Artistic approach ==
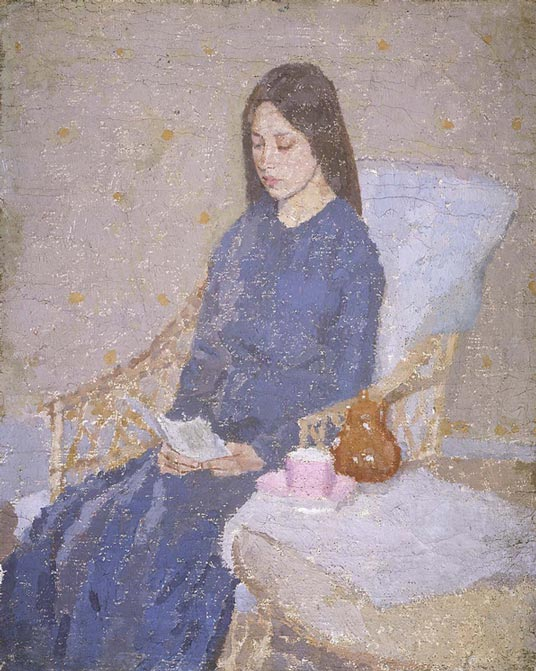
The Convalescent (c. 1923–1924), one of ten versions she painted of this composition

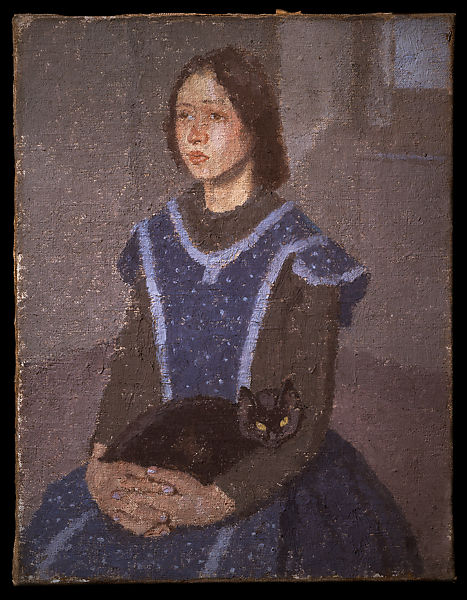
Girl with a Cat, between 1918 and 1922, Metropolitan Museum of Art

In 1916, John wrote in a letter: "I think a picture ought to be done in 1 sitting or at most 2. For that one must paint a lot of canvases probably and waste them." Her surviving oeuvre is comparatively small, comprising 158 known oil paintings which rarely exceed 24 inches (61 cm) in height or width. The majority are portraits, but she also painted still life compositions, interiors and a few landscapes. John wrote: "...a cat or a man, its the same thing ... its an affair of volumes ... the object is of no importance."

Her early paintings, such as the Portrait of the Artist's Sister Winifred (c. 1897–1898) and Dorelia in a Black Dress (1903–1904), are painted using thin glazes in the traditional manner of the old masters. Beginning with her series of paintings of Mère Poussepin (c. 1913), her style is characterised by thicker paint applied in small, mosaic-like touches. It became her habit to paint the same subject repeatedly. Her portraits are usually of anonymous female sitters seated in a three-quarter–length format, with their hands in their laps. One of her models, Jeanne Foster, wrote of John: "She takes down my hair and does it like her own ... she has me sit as she does, and I feel the absorption of her personality as I sit."

John created thousands of drawings. In addition to studio work, she made many sketches and watercolours of women and children in church. Unlike her oil paintings of solitary women, these sketches frequently depict subjects from behind and in groups. John also made many sketches of her cats. Daringly for a female artist of the era, she made two nude drawings of herself. She created few prints and only two etchings made in 1910 exist. A Country Life article from October 1946 says that she destroyed many of her works, that her oil paintings are few in number, and that the majority of her work consisted of watercolours and drawings.

John's notebooks and letters contain personal formulae for observing nature, painting a portrait, designating colours by a system of numbers, and the like. Their meaning is often obscure, but they reveal John's predilection for order and the lasting influence of Whistler, whose teaching emphasised systematic preparation.

Gwen John's art, in its quietude and its subtle colour relationships, stands in contrast to her brother's far more vivid and assertive work. Though she was once overshadowed by her popular brother, critical opinion now tends to view Gwen as the more talented of the two. Augustus himself had predicted this reversal, saying: "In 50 years' time I will be known as the brother of Gwen John."

== Sexuality ==
Throughout her life, John was attracted to men and women. As a student, she had an affair with her fellow artist Ambrose McEvoy. Although Auguste Rodin was her great love, she had a number of same-sex relationships. While at the Slade she developed a passion for an unnamed woman, which her brother Augustus describes in his autobiography Chiaroscuro, and while walking to Paris with Dorelia McNeill, she developed a passion for a married girl, who then followed them to Paris. It has been suggested that Gwen John had romantic feelings for McNeill. Rodin, who had a sexual relationship with his assistant Hilda Flodin, drew erotic drawings of Flodin and John together. The German painter Ida Gerhardi fell in love with John but it was not reciprocated. John's last passion was Véra Oumançoff, for whom she developed an obsession, much to Oumançoff's discomfort.

== Legacy ==
In a 1958 Daily News (London) article, it mentioned that John disliked selling her work and left possessions to her nephew, Edwin, Augustus' son.

John's pictures are held in many public collections. Some of the best examples are in National Museum Cardiff and in Tate Britain, London.

Still Lives, by Candida Cave, is a four-person play written in 1969 about Augustus John, Gwen John, Ida John (Augustus John's wife) and Dorelia McNeill (Augustus John's mistress).

An art mystery novel The Gwen John Sculpture (1985), by John Andrews, writing as John Malcolm, features her stay in Meudon and her relationship with Rodin.

Margaret Forster wrote a novel, published 2006, Keeping the World Away, centred upon a picture by John, A Corner of the Artist's Room in Paris, which starts with the story of John herself and then follows stories of fictional women who subsequently owned it and responded to it. The title comes from something written by John: "Rules to Keep the World away: Do not listen to people (more than is necessary); Do not look at people (ditto); Have as little intercourse with people as possible; When you come into contact with people, talk as little a possible ..."

An S4C documentary presented by Ffion Hague about Gwen John's life included filming of the unveiling of a memorial plaque to the artist in Dieppe's Janval Cemetery in 2015.

John was the aunt of the cellist Amaryllis Fleming, her brother's illegitimate daughter with his other mistress Evelyn Fleming, whose husband Valentine was a Member of Parliament. Other nephews and nieces included Sir Caspar, Vivien, Tristan de Vere Cole and Gwyneth Johnstone. Cole and Johnstone were also born from Augustus's other relationships.

The National Museum Cardiff put on the first significant exhibition of her work in forty years in Gwen John: Strange Beauties from 7 February – 28 June 2026, to commemorate 150 years since John's birth. BBC 2 Wales made a documentary Keep the World Away – Finding Gwen John to accompany the exhibition, hosted by Sian Eleri. The catalog was edited by Rachel Stratton and Lucy Wood (ISBN 978-0-300-28657-1). The exhibit is scheduled to travel to the Yale Center for British Art from 18 February – 20 June 2027, and the National Museum of Women in the Arts from 30 July – 28 November 2027.

== Gallery ==
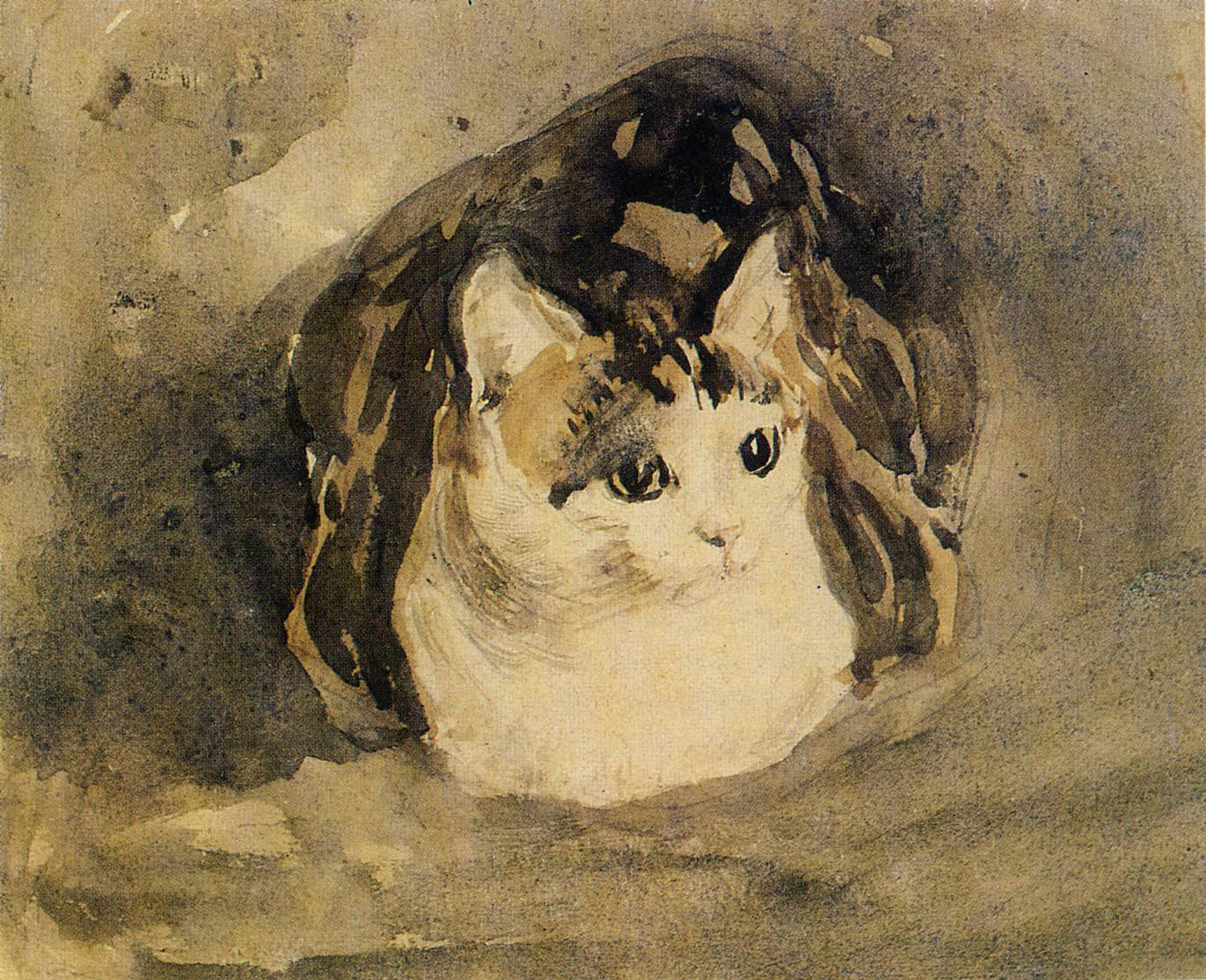
Cat, c. 1904–1908

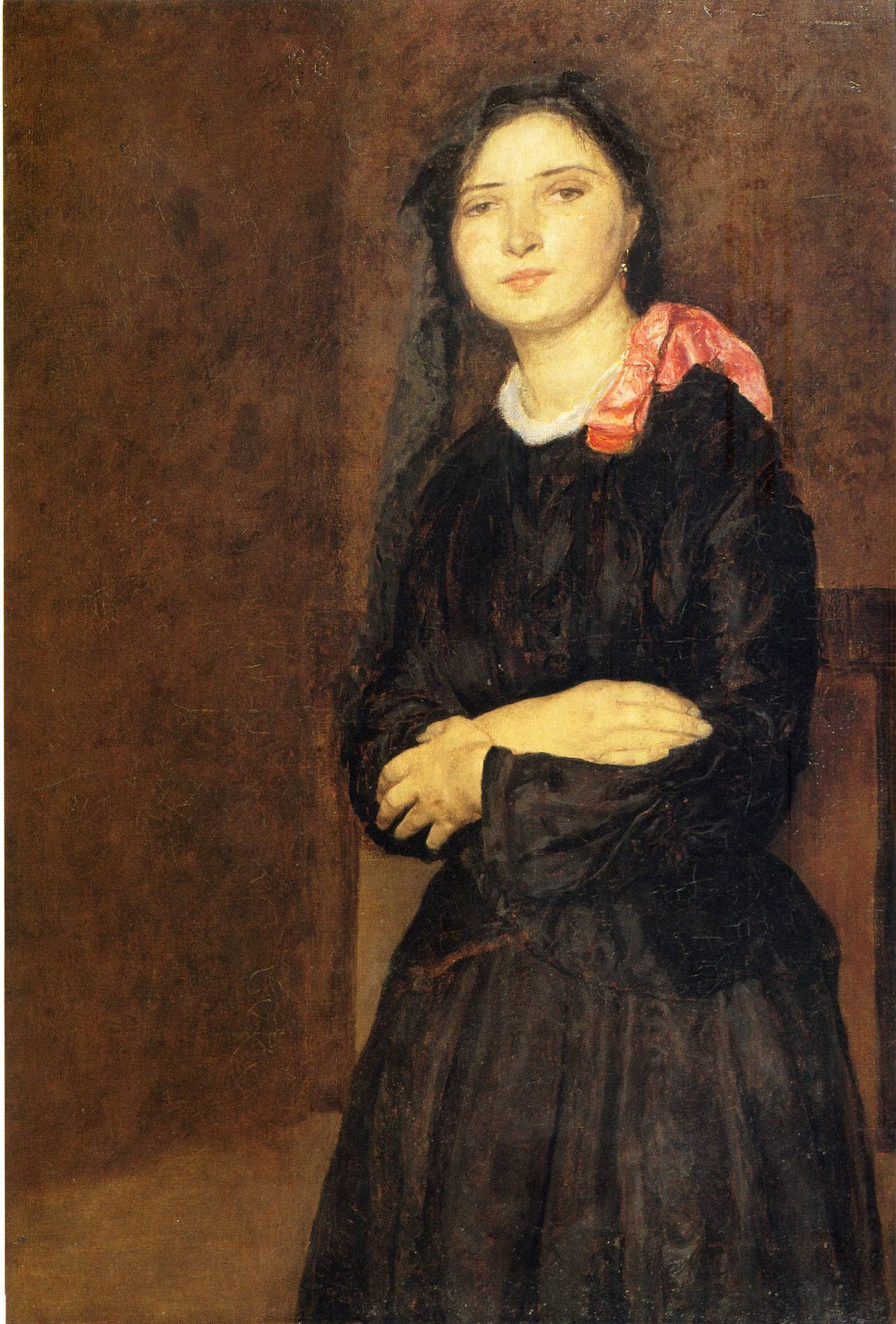
Dorelia in a Black Dress, 1903–1904, Tate Gallery

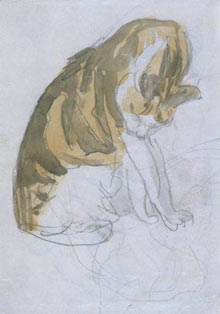
Cat Cleaning Itself, c. 1905–1908, pencil and watercolour

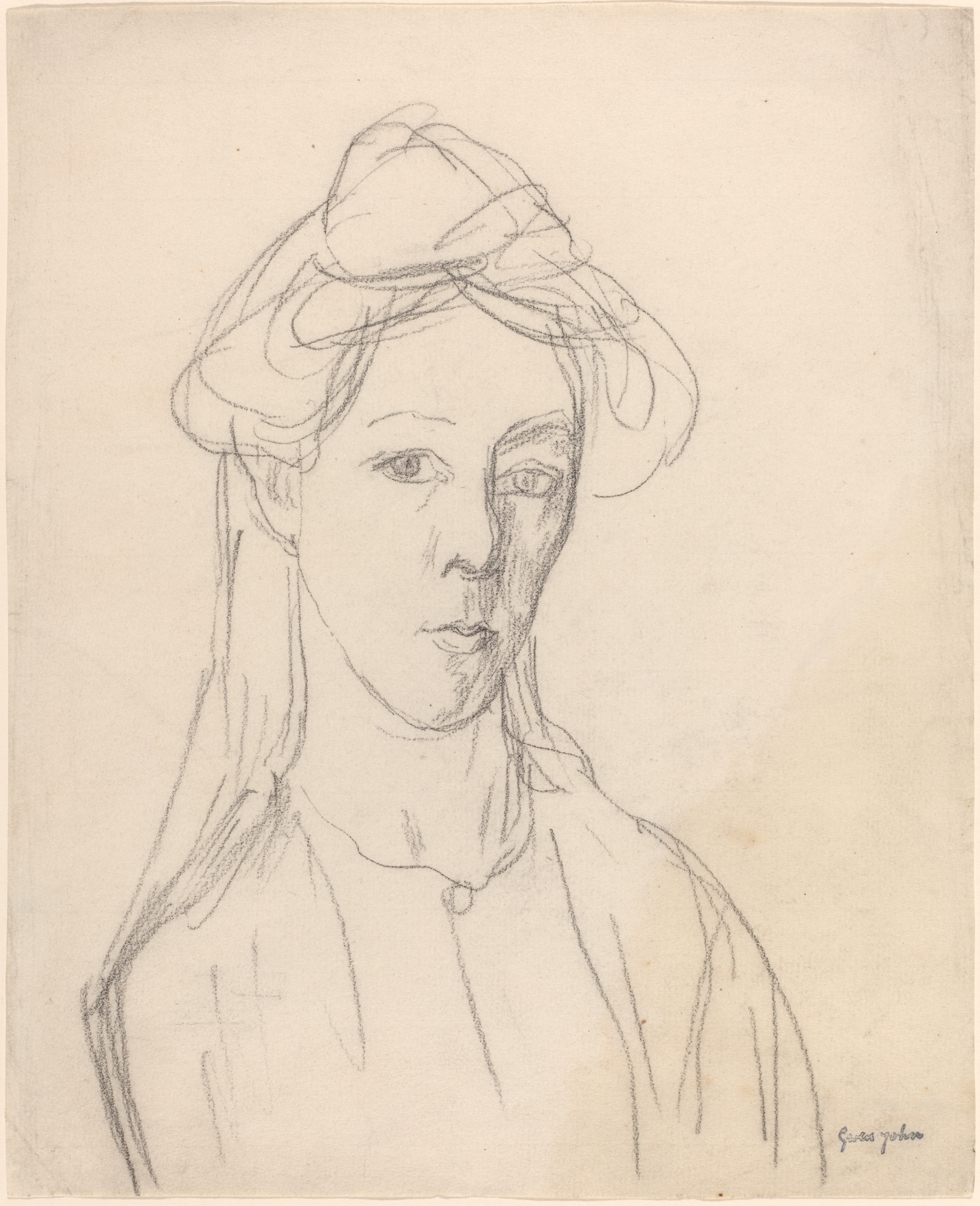
Self-Portrait, probably 1907–1909, National Gallery of Art

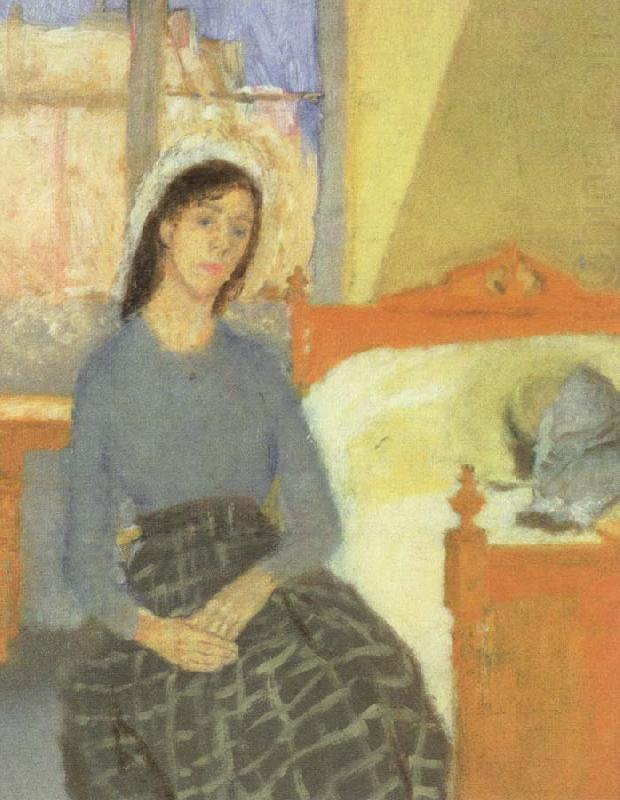
The Artist in Her Room in Paris, 1907–1909

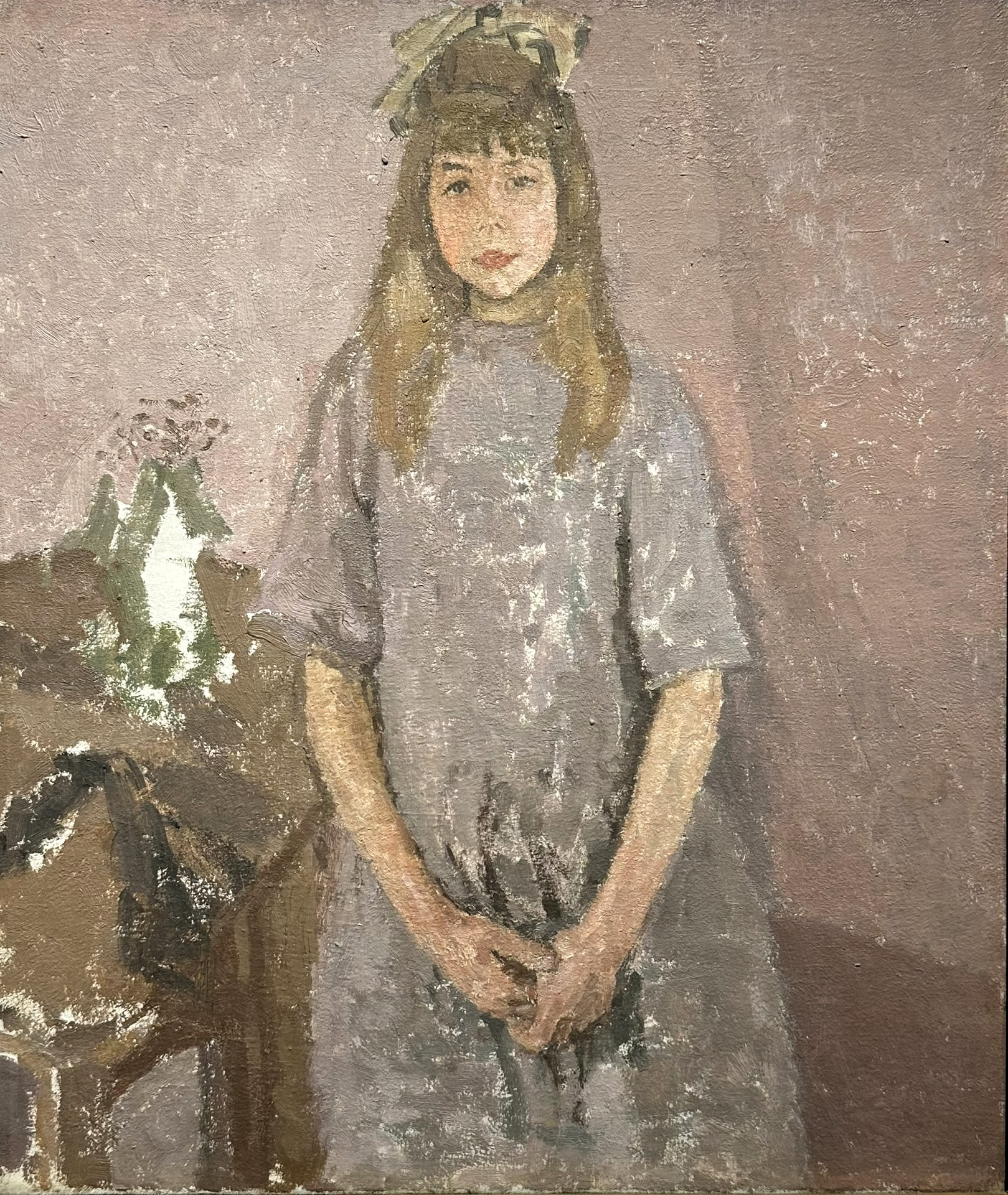
The Little Model, c. 1915–1920, National Museum of Women in the Arts

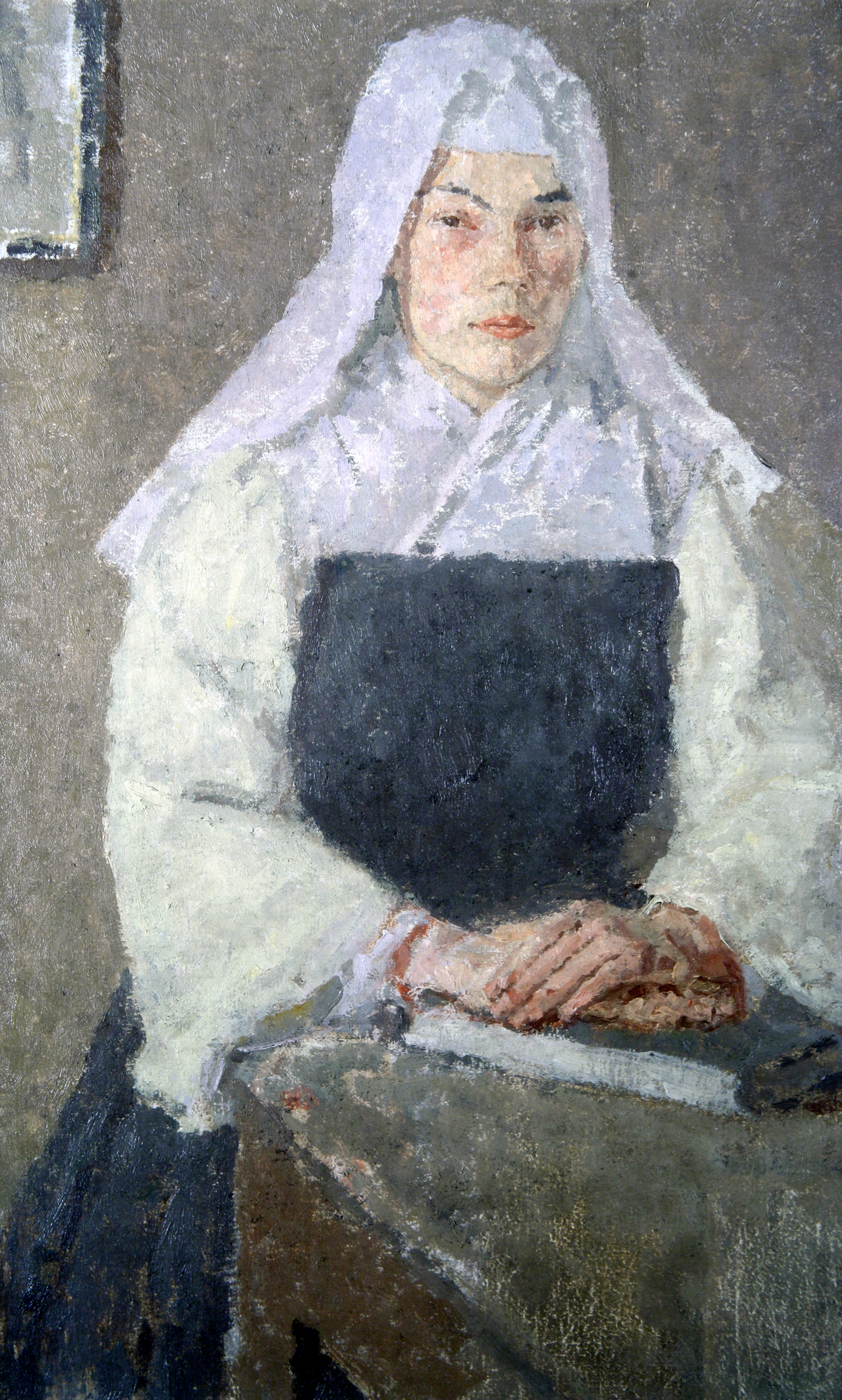
The Nun, c. 1915–1921, Glynn Vivian Art Gallery, Swansea

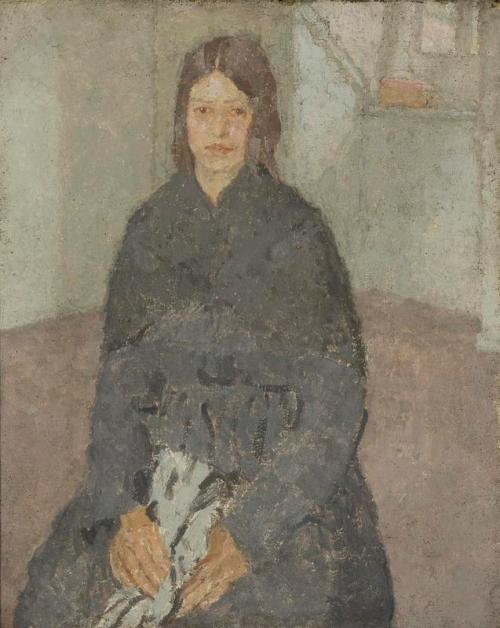
Girl Holding a Piece of Sewing, 1915–1925, Aberdeen Art Gallery

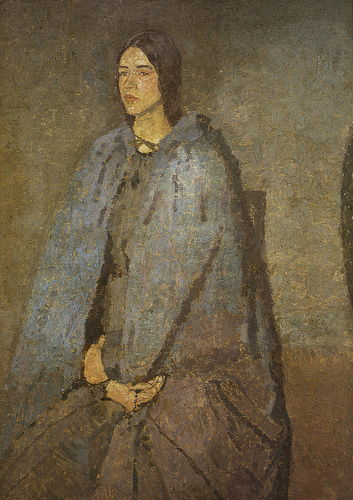
The Pilgrim, c. 1915–1925, Yale Center for British Art

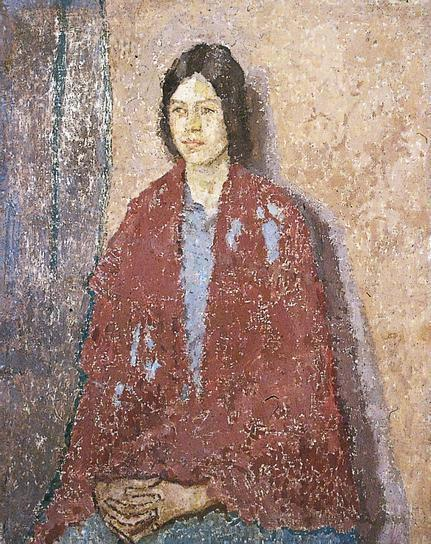
Young Woman in a Red Shawl, c. 1917–1923

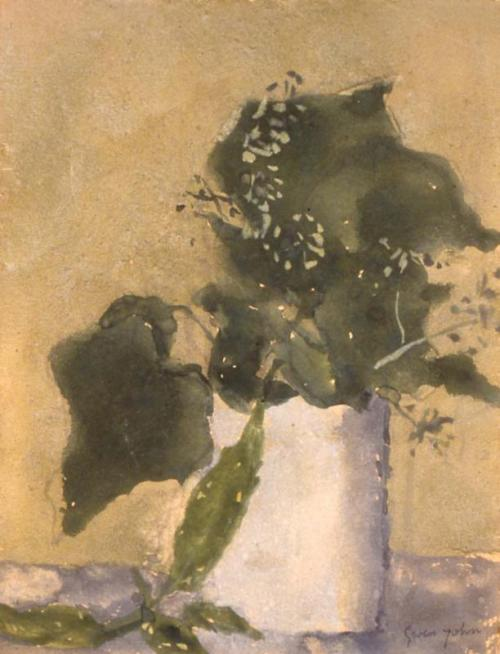
Ivy Leaves in a White Jug, 1920–1925, Aberdeen Art Gallery

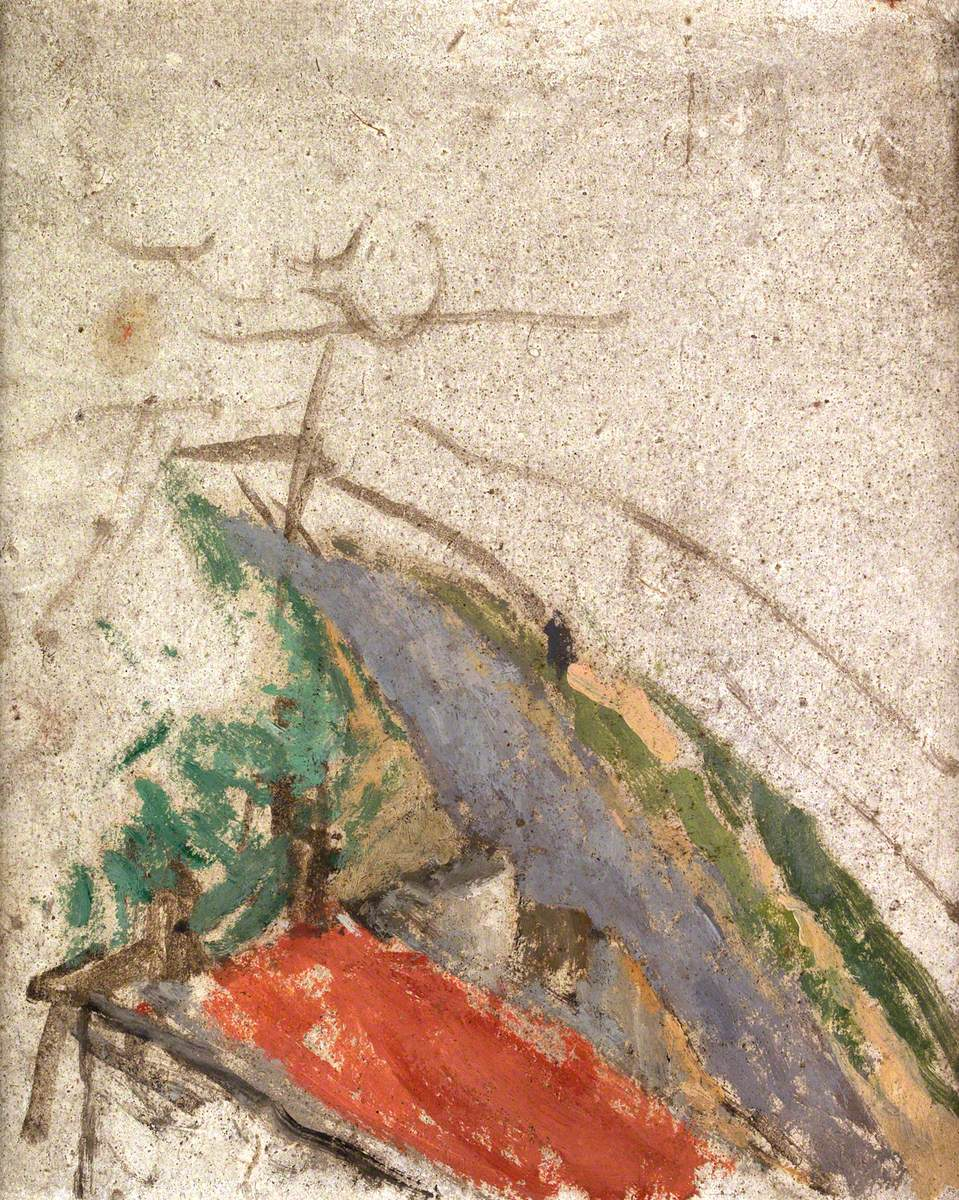
Rooftop and Lane: View from the Artist's Studio, 1920s
