= Dorelia McNeill =

Artist's muse

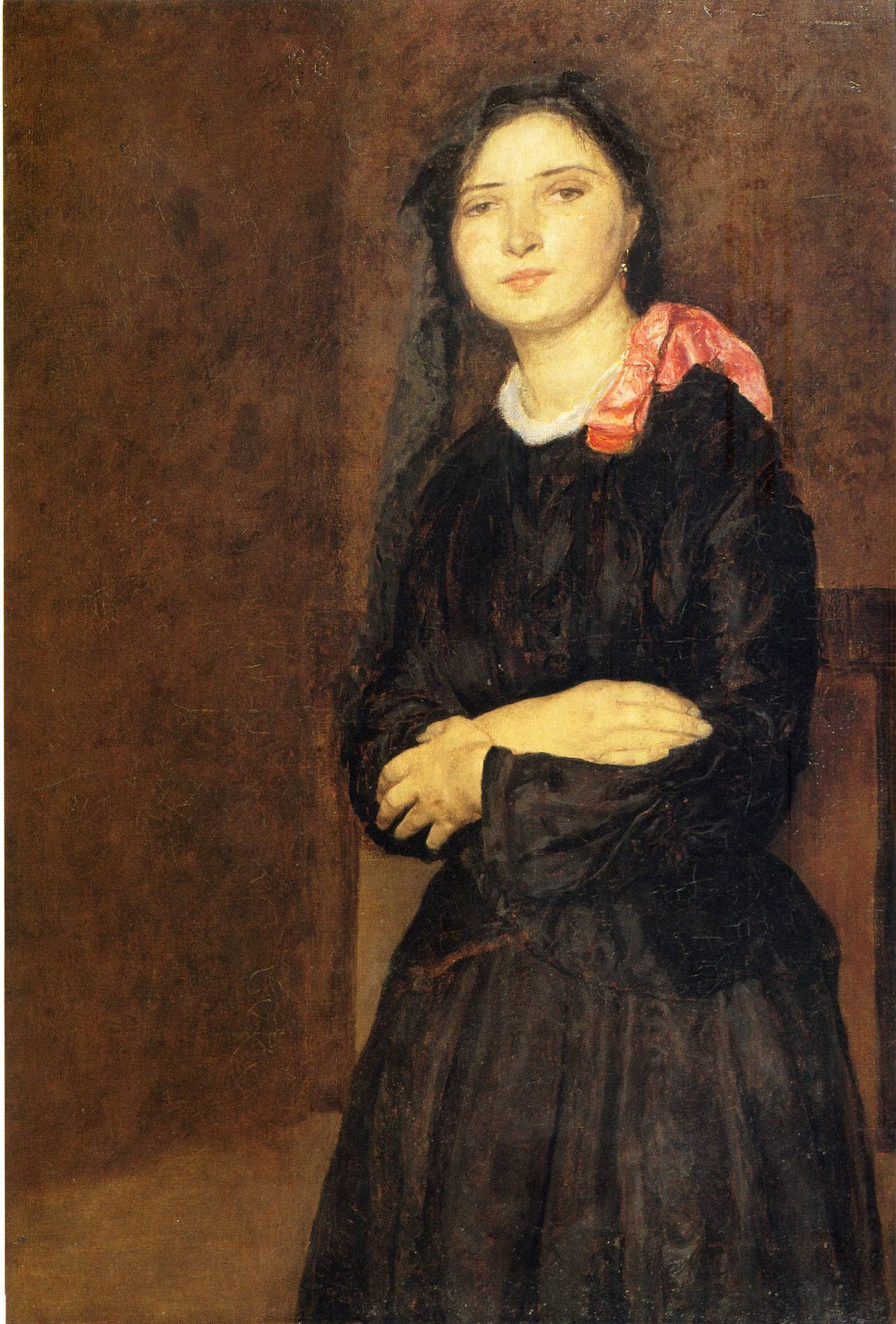
Dorelia in a Black Dress (c.1903–04) by Gwen John

Dorelia McNeill (born Dorothy McNeill; 19 December 1881 – 23 July 1969) was best known as a model for the Welsh artists Gwen John and Augustus John, was the mistress of the latter, and has been credited for inspiring "his first unequivocally personal work". In her time she was regarded by some as an exemplar of bohemian fashion.

== Biography ==
Dorothy McNeill, later known as Dorelia McNeill, was born in Camberwell, the daughter of a clerk and the fourth of seven children. While attending the Westminster School of Art in 1903 she met Gwen John, who in turn introduced her to her brother Augustus. That year Gwen and McNeill traveled together on foot through France, following the river Garonne. During a stay in Toulouse Gwen John painted several oils of McNeill, including Dorelia in a Black Dress, before the two proceeded to Paris, where they briefly shared quarters in 1904.

It has been suggested that Gwen John had romantic feelings for McNeill. McNeill left for Bruges with a Belgian artist, and was pursued by Augustus, with whom she returned to England. She lived in a ménage à trois with Augustus John and his wife Ida Nettleship, sometimes as part of a Gypsy caravan that would grow to include John's children by both women. The arrangement lasted until Nettleship's death in 1907, when McNeill became the principal female figure in the John household. Later she had an affair, at Augustus' encouragement, with the painter Henry Lamb.

McNeill is often described as quiet and enigmatic. In Gwen John's work she appears detached and simply dressed; in Augustus John's art she at times served more exotic purposes, wearing scarves and long dresses, but was also the subject of domestic scenes, including those which show her with Augustus' first wife and their children. It is said that she "made a significant contribution to the 'bohemian utopianism' of the artist's most intensely creative period, c. 1903-1914." Eventually she had two sons and two daughters with Augustus, including Vivien, who became an artist in her own right. McNeill lived with Augustus until his death in 1961. Her step-granddaughter was the 1960s bohemian fashion icon Talitha Getty.
