= Ida Nettleship =

English artist (1877–1907)

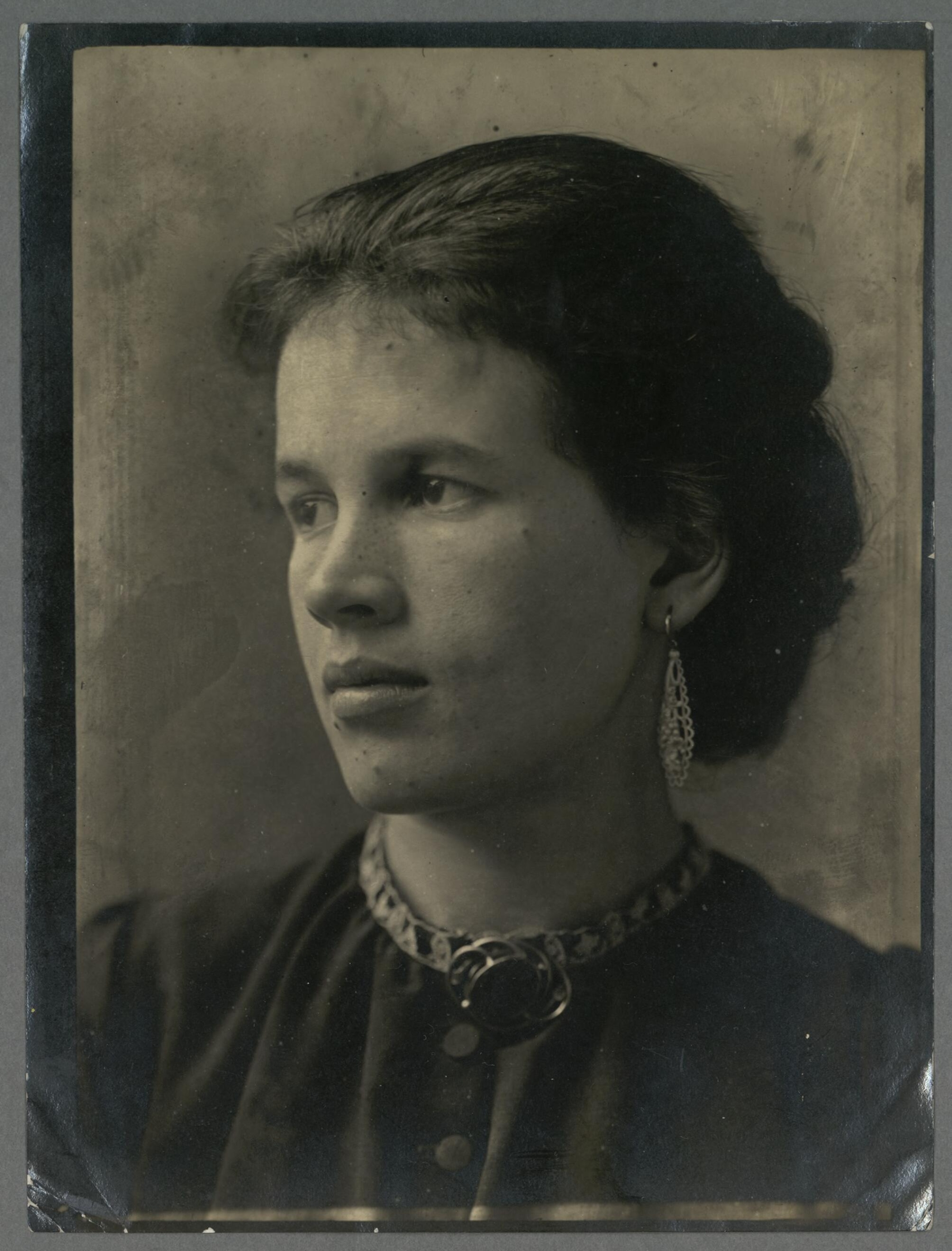
Ida Nettleship

Ida Margaret Nettleship (24 January 1877 – 14 March 1907) was a British artist who is best known as the first wife of artist Augustus John.

== Biography ==
Nettleship was born in Hampstead, the eldest of the three daughters of animal painter John Trivett Nettleship and his wife Adaline, better known as Ada Nettleship, dressmaker and daughter of otologist James Hinton.

At the age of 15, she became a student at the Slade School of Art, where she studied until 1898 under Fred Brown, Henry Tonks, and Wilson Steer. Among her fellow students, she befriended Gwen Salmond, Edna Waugh, Gwen John, and Bessie and Dorothy Salaman. She became engaged to their brother Clement Salaman but broke it off in 1897 and traveled to Italy. She followed up with a trip to Paris in 1898, where she shared a flat with Gwen John and Gwen Salmond and studied under James McNeill Whistler at the Académie Carmen.

Towards the end of her time at the Slade, she met Gwen's brother Augustus John, and they married on 24 January 1901. They honeymooned in Swanage and initially took a flat in Fitzroy Street, London, but John was soon appointed a temporary professor at the school of art at University College, Liverpool. They remained in Liverpool for 18 months, and it was there that the first of their five sons, David Anthony Nettleship, was born in January 1902. He later became a musician and postman. A portrait of Ida by John from around 1901, while she was in her first pregnancy, is held by the National Museum of Wales.

The family moved to London in 1903, where John co-founded Chelsea Art School with William Orpen. Their second son Caspar John was born in London on 22 March 1903; he became an officer in the Royal Navy, eventually rising to the post of First Sea Lord.

Later in 1903, Nettleship's life with John was complicated when Dorelia McNeill became John's model and mistress. From 1903 to 1907, the three lived together in a ménage à trois, first at Matching Green in Essex and from 1905 in Paris. Nettleship had three further sons with John in quick succession: Robin (born 1904 in Essex), who became a linguist; Edwin (born 1905 in Paris), who became a boxer and watercolourist; and Henry (born 1907 in Paris), who became a religious philosopher. During this period, Dorelia also had children with John, in 1905 and 1906.

Given John's limited income and the growing family, Nettleship eventually gave up painting to take care of the children and the housework. Although she found this wearisome and considered leaving John, she did not live long enough to do so. She died of puerperal fever in Paris in 1907 after the birth of her fifth son, Henry John (1907–1935). Her mother arranged her cremation at the Père Lachaise Cemetery.

John remained with Dorelia after Nettleship's death, and they brought up Nettleship's children.

The Good Bohemian, an edition of Nettleship's letters, was published in 2017; it was edited by John's granddaughter Rebecca John and John's biographer Michael Holroyd.
