= Garsington =

Village in Oxfordshire, England

Coordinates: 51.716°N 1.161°W

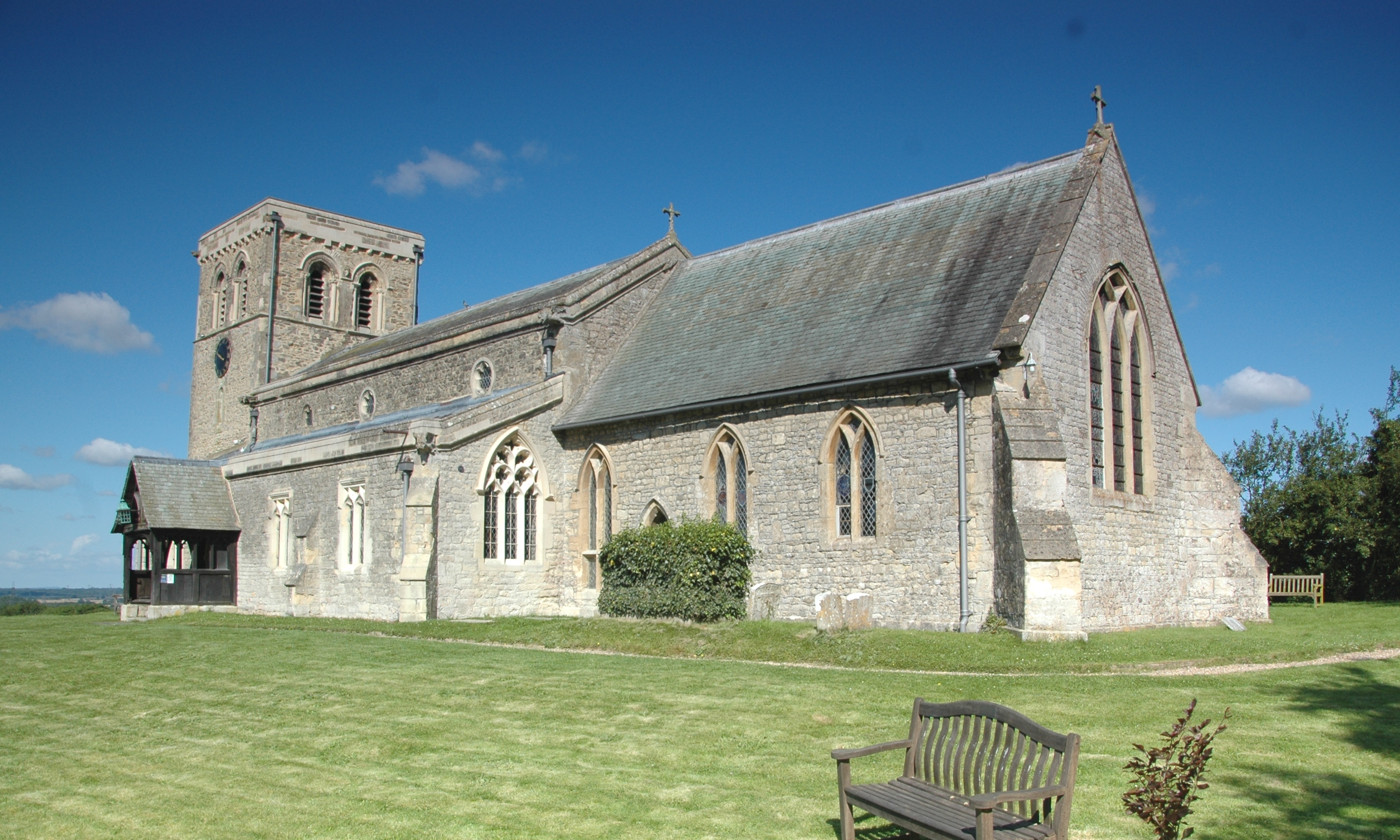
- St Mary's parish church

- Location within Oxfordshire
- Area: 8.42 km^{2} (3.25 sq mi)
- Population: 1,689 (2011 census)
  - Density: 201/km^{2} (520/sq mi)
- OS grid reference: SP5802
- Civil parish: Garsington
- District: South Oxfordshire
- Shire county: Oxfordshire
- Region: South East
- Country: England
- Sovereign state: United Kingdom
- Post town: OXFORD
- Postcode district: OX44
- Dialling code: 01865
- Police: Thames Valley
- Fire: Oxfordshire
- Ambulance: South Central
- UK Parliament: Henley and Thame
- Website: Garsington Parish Council

Garsington is a village and civil parish about 8 kilometres (5 mi) southeast of Oxford in Oxfordshire. "A History of the County of Oxfordshire" provides a detailed history of the parish from 1082. The 2011 census recorded the parish's population as 1,689.

The village is known for the artistic colony and flamboyant social life of the Bloomsbury Group at Garsington Manor when it was the home from 1914 to 1928 of Philip and Ottoline Morrell, and for the Garsington Opera which was staged there from 1989 to 2010.

== Buildings ==
=== Garsington Manor ===
Garsington Manor in Southend was built in the 16th century and remodelled in the 17th century. It is a Grade II* listed building. It was the home of Lady Ottoline Morrell (1873–1938), doyenne of the Bloomsbury group of writers and artists who used to meet at the manor. These included the philosopher Bertrand Russell, the writers Aldous Huxley, W. B. Yeats, Virginia Woolf and D. H. Lawrence and the artists Mark Gertler, Eric Gill and Dora Carrington. Garsington Manor was bought in 1982 by Leonard Ingrams who established the Garsington Opera, an annual open air opera festival which was staged there each summer from 1989 until 2010. The opera moved to Wormsley Park, Buckinghamshire in 2011.

=== Parish church ===
The oldest part of the parish church of Saint Mary includes the tower, built towards the end of the 12th century in the transitional style between Norman and Early English. The chancel is pure Early English and was built or rebuilt in about 1300. St Mary's has Decorated Gothic north and south aisles, which were added in the 14th century and have four-bay arcades. St Mary's was restored in 1849 under the direction of the Gothic Revival architect Joseph Clarke. Clarke's alterations included rebuilding the chancel arch to match the north arcade, adding gargoyles to the south aisle and much remodelling of the north aisle. St Mary's is a Grade II* listed building. Inside, next to the entrance door, is a memorial to Garsington's most illustrious inhabitant, Ottoline Morrell, by Eric Gill.

The west tower has a ring of six bells. Richard Keene of Woodstock cast the treble bell in 1696. Abraham II Rudhall of Gloucester cast the second bell in 1720. Henry III Bagley of Chacombe, Northamptonshire cast the third bell in 1733, presumably at his then foundry in Witney. John Rudhall of Gloucester cast the tenor bell in 1788. W&J Taylor cast the fifth bell in 1825, presumably at their then foundry in Oxford. The fourth bell was cast in 1732 but Mears and Stainbank of the Whitechapel Bell Foundry recast it in 1929. The bells were restored in 2013. Thomas Thwaites of Clerkenwell in London built the turret clock for the tower in 1796 at a cost of £172 4s 0d. It is a 30-hour clock and it strikes the hours on the tenor bell. Its dials still have only an hour hand.

St Mary's parish is now part of the Benefice of Garsington, Cuddesdon and Horspath.

The wedding scene in the 2006 film Amazing Grace was filmed at the church.

=== School ===
A parish school was built in Garsington in 1840. It was reorganised as a junior school in 1923. It now occupies more modern premises and is a Church of England primary school.

=== Village hall ===
The village hall was built in 1911 and given to the village by Philip Morrell. For most of the 20th century it served the needs of the villagers and a number of small improvements were made over the years. It was recently renovated to bring it up to modern day standards. The building retains its original appearance with the addition of modern-day facilities.

== Amenities ==
Garsington has a restaurant and public house: the Manor Bar, previously the Three Horseshoes, with the Red Lion and the Plough having closed.

Garsington Sports and Social Club is in Denton Lane. It has two men's football teams that play in the Oxfordshire Senior Football League and two youth teams that play in the Oxford Mail Youth League Garsington Cricket Club plays in the Oxfordshire Cricket Association League Division Five.

The Garsington Society seeks to expand the knowledge of the history and geography of Garsington and its surrounding areas, and organises talks, walks, and social events.

Garsington has a Women's Institute.

The most recent dramatic production by the Garsington Players was "Ladies' Day" in August 2026.

The village has a rich network of footpaths and bridleways which are maintained by local volunteers. This includes a section of the Oxford Green Belt way.

The city11 bus service connects Garsington to Oxford and Watlington. There has never been a railway station. Nearby stations include Oxford, Didcot Parkway, and Thame and Haddenham Parkway.

== Residents ==
In addition to the Bloomsbury Group and the Garsington Opera residents have included historians John Wheeler-Bennett, Raymond Dawson and Russell Meiggs, writers Rider Haggard, Adrian Townsend, Howard Marks and Janet Bolam, surgeon Edgar Somerville, medical scientists Paul Bolam, John Hall and Philip Cowen,, mathematician Professor Roger Heath-Brown and economist Professor Anthony Venables.

== Gallery ==
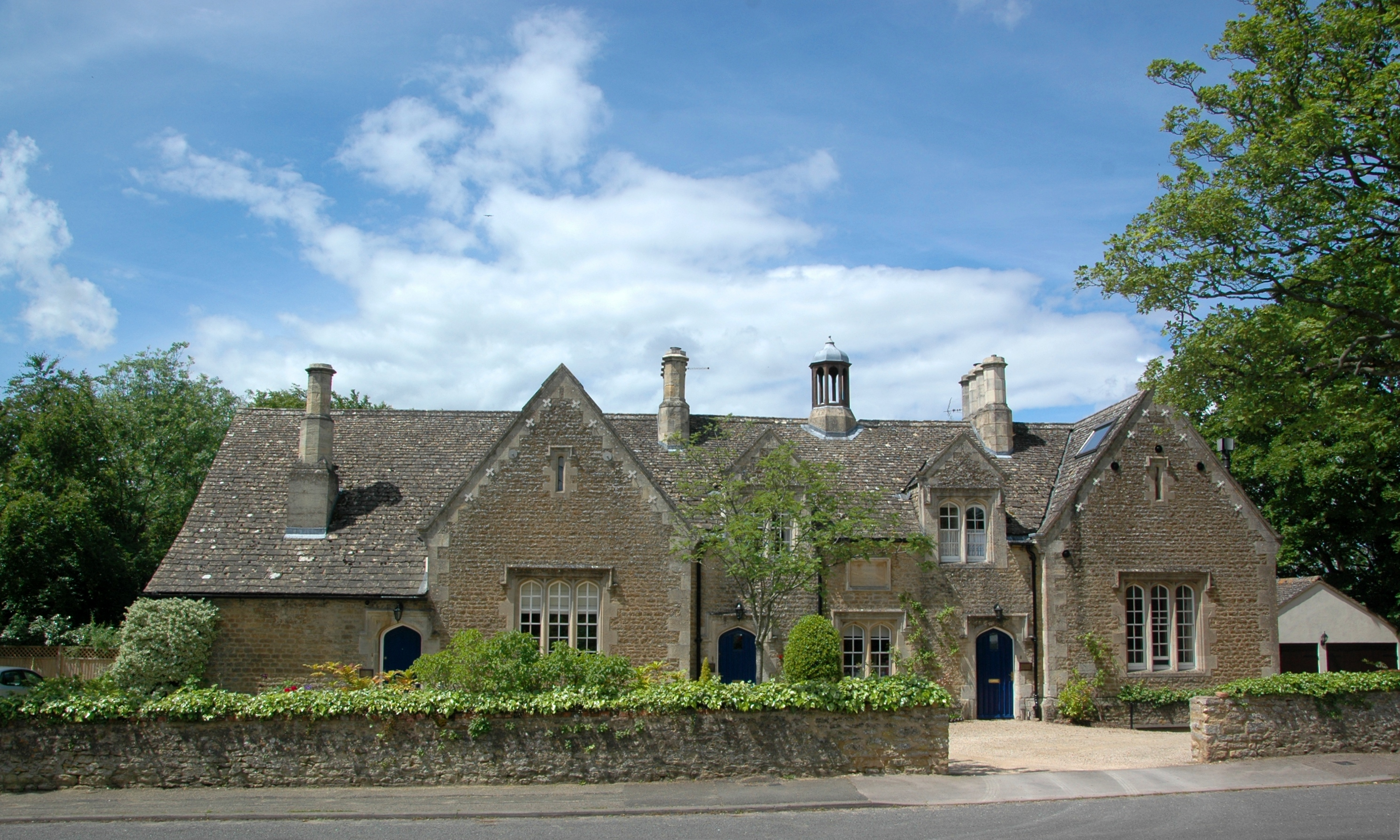
The 1840 building of Garsington parish school. The school now has more modern premises in the parish, and the old building is now a house.

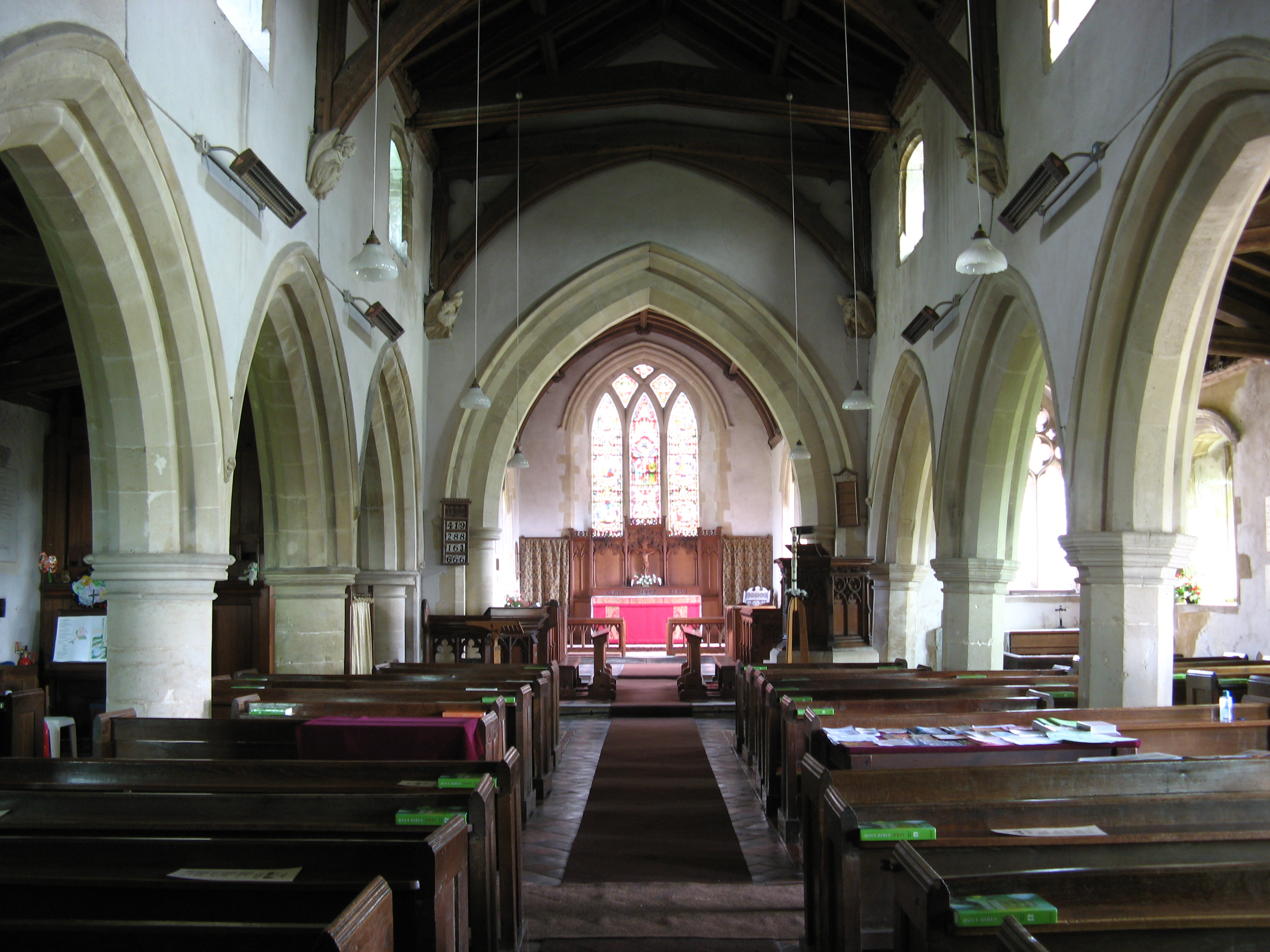
Inside St Mary's parish church

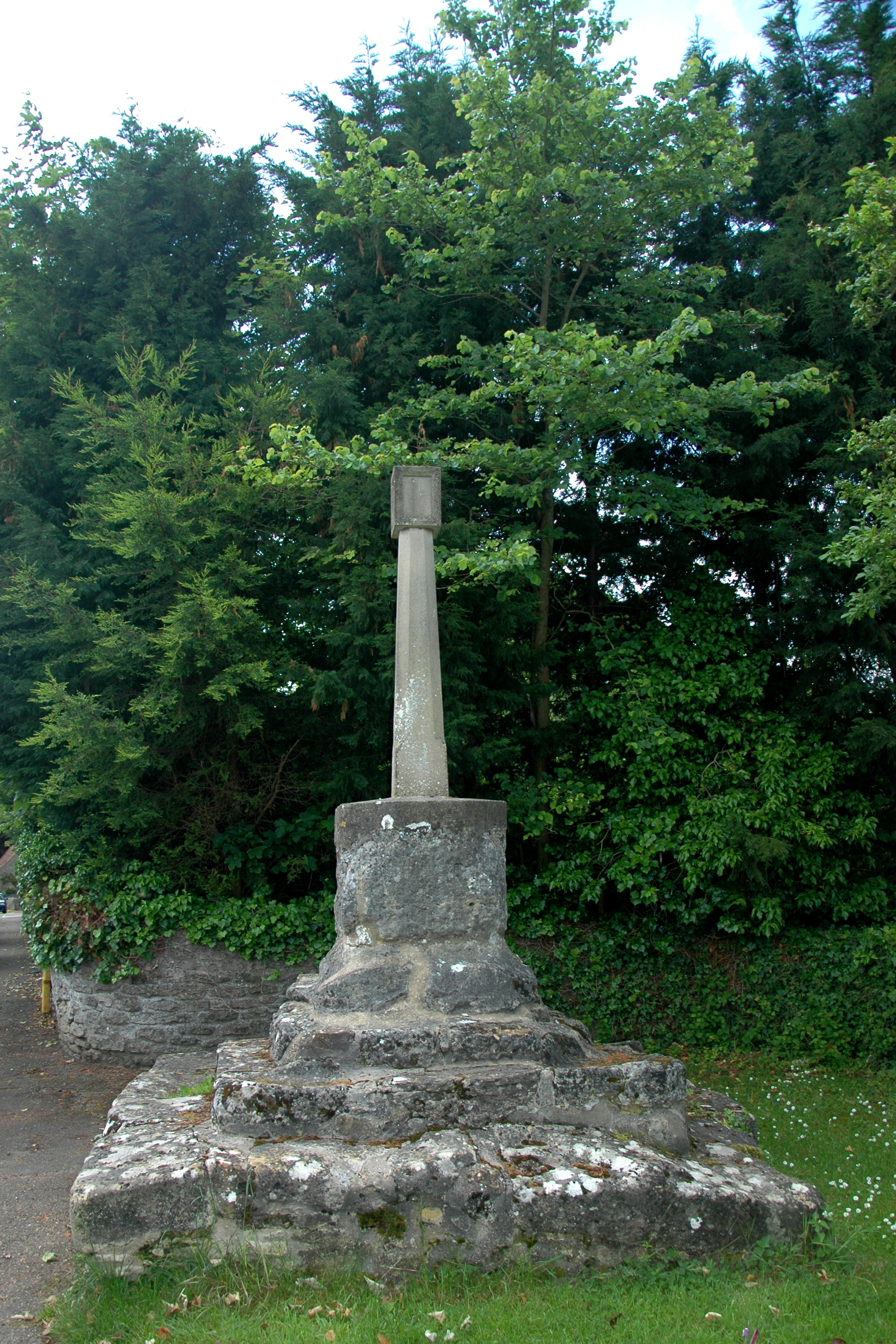
Garsington preaching cross has its medieval base and a remnant of its medieval shaft. Upon it are a small 20th century shaft and top.

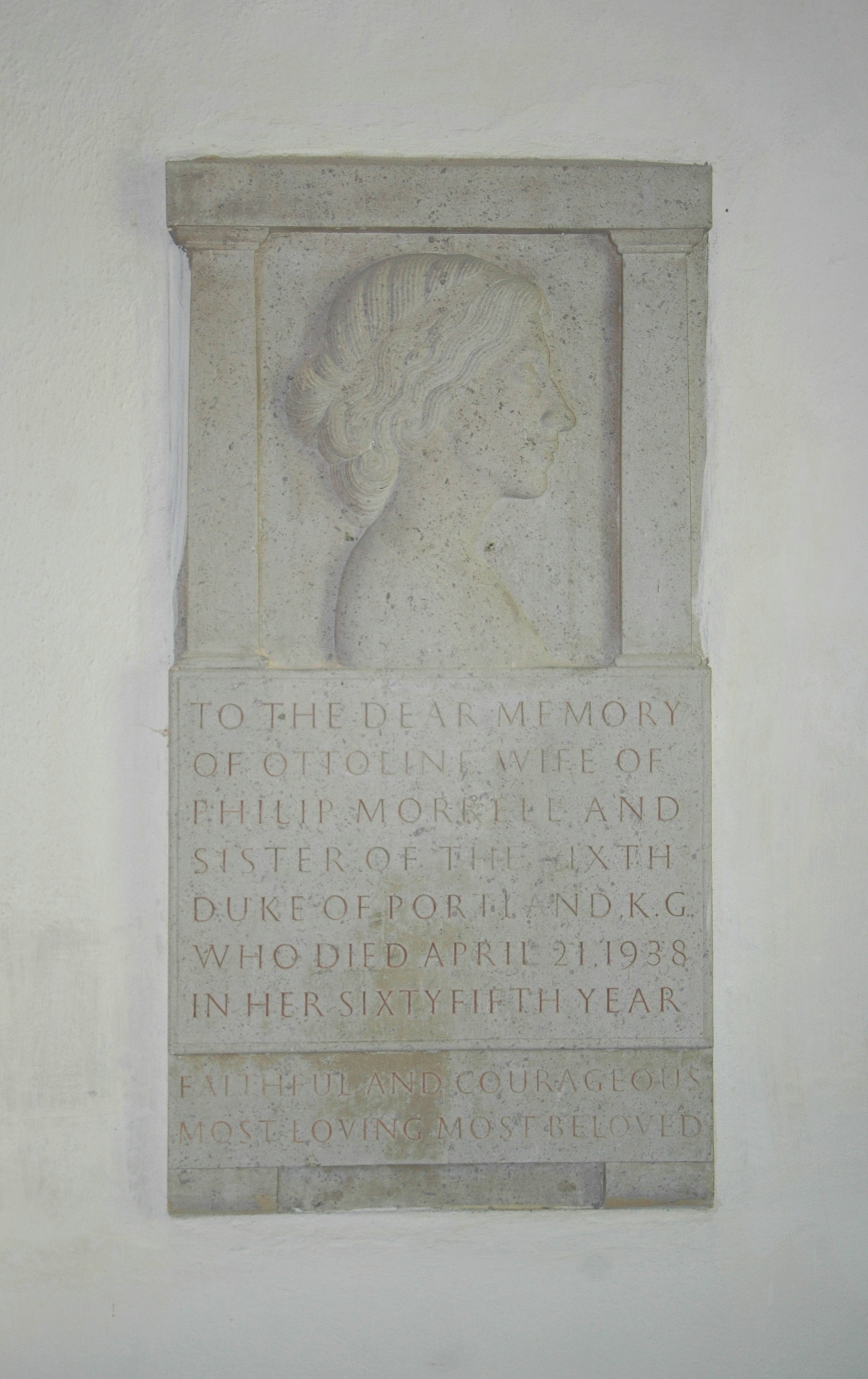
Monument in St Mary's parish church to Lady Ottoline Morrell, carved by Eric Gill

== Sources ==
- Beeson, C.F.C. (1989) [1962]. Simcock, A.V (ed.). Clockmaking in Oxfordshire 1400–1850 (3rd ed.). Oxford: Museum of the History of Science. p. 38. ISBN 0-903364-06-9.
- Lobel, Mary D, ed. (1957). A History of the County of Oxford. Victoria County History. Vol. 5: Bullingdon Hundred. London: Oxford University Press for the Institute of Historical Research. pp. 134–156.
- Sherwood, Jennifer; Pevsner, Nikolaus (1974). Oxfordshire. The Buildings of England. Harmondsworth: Penguin Books. pp. 610–612. ISBN 0-14-071045-0.
