= Lucy Mary Silcox =

English headteacher and feminist

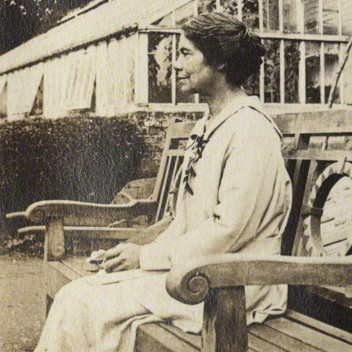
- Born: 11 July 1862; Warminster, England
- Died: 11 January 1947 (aged 84); Boars Hill, England
- Education: Newnham College
- Occupation: Headteacher

Lucy Mary Silcox (11 July 1862 – 11 January 1947) was an English headteacher and feminist. She was noted as an inspiring head at three girls' schools.

== Life ==
Silcox was born in Warminster in 1862.

After gaining a first class pass at the classics tripos at Newnham College she began teaching classics at Liverpool High School for Girls. In 1890 she was given her first headship when she began to lead the East Liverpool High School for Girls funded by what became the Girls' Day School Trust. It opened in 1891 with 17 pupils. She gave her time to give extra lessons to pupils including the future member of parliament Eleanor Rathbone. In 1900 she moved on to lead the West Dulwich High School for Girls leaving her previous school under the leadership of her younger sister.

Sir Ernest Gowers was amongst those who considered Silcox to be an outstanding head teacher. She believed in her pupils and she trusted them to largely self govern the school. Meanwhile she led them to give of themselves freely and to value truth and beauty. When she began her final job as a headteacher leading the girls' public boarding-school Saint Felix School, Southwold she gave a talk to the school where she compared the school to a ship where each crew member needed to do their part. She took over Saint Felix School from the founding head Margaret Isabella Gardiner who was in poor health. Silcox attracted some pupils and building work commenced with a library and a new hall named Gardiner Hall in 1910.

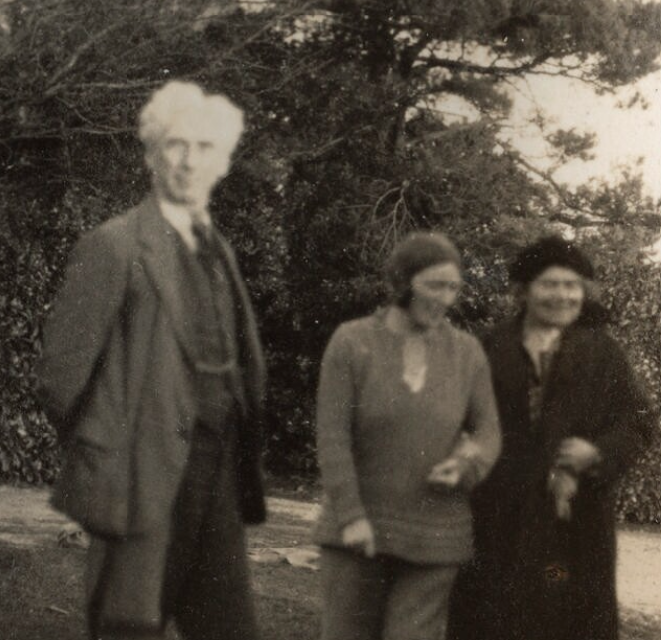
Bertrand and Dora Russell with Silcox in 1922 (by Lady Ottoline Morrell).

She was able to bring leading thinkers and artists to the school and money was found to buy sculpture and paintings. The modernist paintings she bought inspired pupils like the artist Gwyneth Johnstone who remembered seeing work by Christopher Wood. She directed the girls in ancient Greek plays and she was a role model for demanding change. She was President of the local National Union of Women's Suffrage Societies and she gave talks in surrounding villages in support of women gaining the vote.

She became a wartime head and during the 1916-1917 school year there was an outpost of the school at Penmaenmawr. The school was evacuated more than once, however she stuck by her values. She helped Serbian refugees. During a debate about poor behaviour by their enemies she said that they should and could not retaliate in kind. She said "If we perish we perish but we will not do this thing". Silcox was head at Saint Felix School until 1926.

Silcox died at her home in Boars Hill, Oxford in 1947. She left her books and paintings to be shared between her school and Newnham College. The paintings were bought by Leicester Art Gallery.
