= Leonard Ingrams =

British opera manager (1941–2005)

- Born: 1 September 1941
- Died: 27 July 2005 (aged 63)
- Occupation: Financer
- Known for: Founder of Garsington Opera
- Spouse: Rosalind Moore (m. 1964)
- Children: 4
- Family: Richard Ingrams (brother)

Leonard Victor Ingrams, OBE (1 September 1941 – 27 July 2005) was a British financier and opera festival founder/impresario.

== Early life ==
Leonard Ingrams was the youngest of four sons. His parents were Leonard St Clair Ingrams, who served in the Secret Service during the Second World War, and Victoria (née Reid). His mother was very musical and he started to learn the violin at the age of six. Later he played in the National Youth Orchestra under Sir Malcolm Sargent. He was educated at Stonyhurst College, where he was inspired by Peter Levi, and at Corpus Christi College, Oxford. He gained a double first in Classical Moderations and Greats. Subsequently, he taught classics at Queen Mary College, University of London from 1965 to 1967.

== Career ==
In 1967 Ingrams joined Barings as an international financier. After postings to Paris, Cologne and Hamburg, in 1974 he was posted to Saudi Arabia. After five years living in Jeddah he and his family moved to Italy where he studied the viola under Bruno Giuranna in Siena. After this short break (of less than a year) he then went back to Saudi Arabia and lived in Riyadh, where he worked as Supreme Financial Advisor to the Saudi Arabian Government. In 1984 he came back to England and started to work as a director at Flemings. After working for Flemings for about ten years he went back to the Middle East to work in Bahrain (1995–1999), before returning to England permanently and setting up his own investment consultancy: L.V.Ingrams & Co.

In 1982, Ingrams and his wife moved to Garsington Manor on the edge of the village of Garsington east of Oxford, England. He later became well known for founding Garsington Opera in 1989, an annual season of opera in the manor gardens, designed by Lady Ottoline Morrell during the First World War. Under his musical directorship the opera company became known for world class productions. Ingrams would travel extensively to seek out singers for particular roles, and under his leadership the Garsington Opera orchestra was established, with its core from the Guildhall Strings.

== Personal life and death ==
Ingrams married Rosalind Moore in 1964, after she had also graduated in classics at Lady Margaret Hall, Oxford and was beginning her Masters' thesis on Rubens under the supervision of Edgar Wind. Leonard Ingrams died suddenly after a heart attack at the age of 63 in 2005. The couple had a son and three daughters. Ingrams also has a surviving elder brother, Richard Ingrams, one of the founders of the satirical magazine Private Eye.
