= St Aidan's College, Durham =

Constituent college of Durham University

St Aidan's College
- Durham University
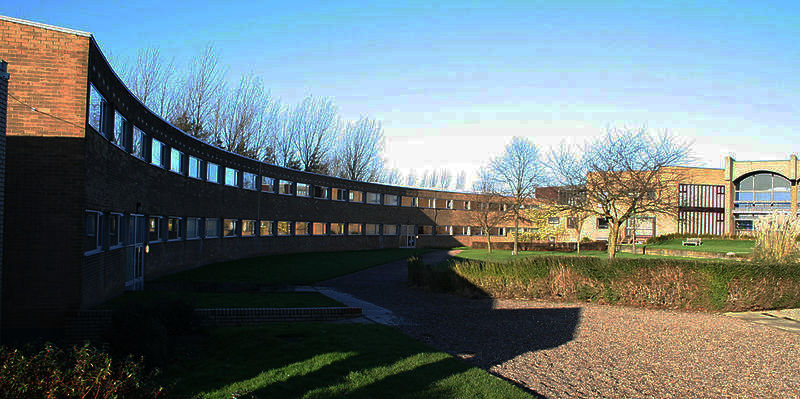
- St. Aidan's College

- Arms of St Aidan's College; Arms: Per chevron argent and sable, in chief two ancient Northumbrian crosses gules, in base two keys in saltire, wards upwards, of the first.
- Location: Windmill Hill, Durham DH1 3LJ
- Coordinates: 54.764167°N 1.583889°W
- Motto: Latin: Super fundamentis certis
- Motto in English: "Upon sure foundations"
- Established: 1947
- Named for: Aidan of Lindisfarne
- Former names: The Association of Women Home Students (1895–1947); St Aidan's Society (1947–1961)
- Principal: Susan Frenk
- Vice principal: Christopher Jones
- Undergraduates: 806
- Postgraduates: 200
- Website: St Aidan's College
- JCR: St Aidan's JCR
- SCR: St Aidan's SCR
- Boat club: St Aidan's Boat Club

Map
- Location within Durham, England

St Aidan's College is a college of Durham University in England. It had its origins in 1895 as the association of women home students, formalised in 1947 as St Aidan's Society. In 1961, it became a full college of the university, and in 1964 moved to new modernist buildings on Elvet Hill designed by Sir Basil Spence.

== History ==
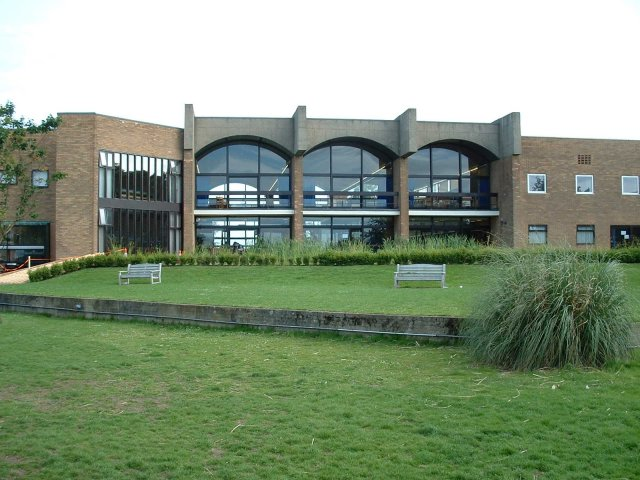
Front view of the central building

The college has its origins in the small group of women, known as home students, who were first allowed to study at Durham in 1895. At that time, and indeed until the Second World War, it was considered unsuitable for female students to live in lodgings: they either had to be members of a college or to live at home. The numbers were never very large; for example, in 1936 there were only five. However, a substantial increase in the number of female students after 1945 meant that the former group of home students was reorganised, emerging as the St Aidan's Society in 1947.

The St Aidan's Society had its offices at 24 North Bailey (now the bar and club of the Durham Union Society). Some of the students lived in Shincliffe Hall and others in lodgings. A common room was soon found in 50 North Bailey and chapel services held at the church of St Mary-le-Bow. The first principal was Ethleen Scott, having been "Censor" of the female home students since 1937.

In 1961 St Aidan's was reconstituted as a full "council college", meaning that its governing council is a sub-committee of the university council, the university's governing body. It moved to its present buildings on Elvet Hill in September 1964, becoming one of the first of the university's "Hill" colleges. The college buildings are in a brutalist style, designed by Sir Basil Spence and arranged in a semi-circular arrangement surrounding a central lawn. The original design was intended to represent the hand of God holding a jewel, with the curved corridors as the fingers, the straight corridors as his thumb, and a small chapel as the jewel. However, financial constraints prevented the chapel from ever being built and later extensions to the straight section did not follow the original idea.

In 1963, Scott was succeeded as principal by Dame Enid Russell-Smith, who handed over to Irene Hindmarsh in 1970. It was during her tenure as principal that it was agreed that St Aidan's should become a mixed college. The first male students were admitted in 1981.

John Ashworth took over in 1998, before becoming dean of colleges in 2007, at which point Susan Frenk became acting principal. In 2008 work on improvements to the extensions were started. The aim was to turn previous fresher rooms into ensuite accommodation for finalists and postgraduates. The newly refurbished extensions, named the Elizabeth Pease House, were opened to students in 2009.

== Organisation ==
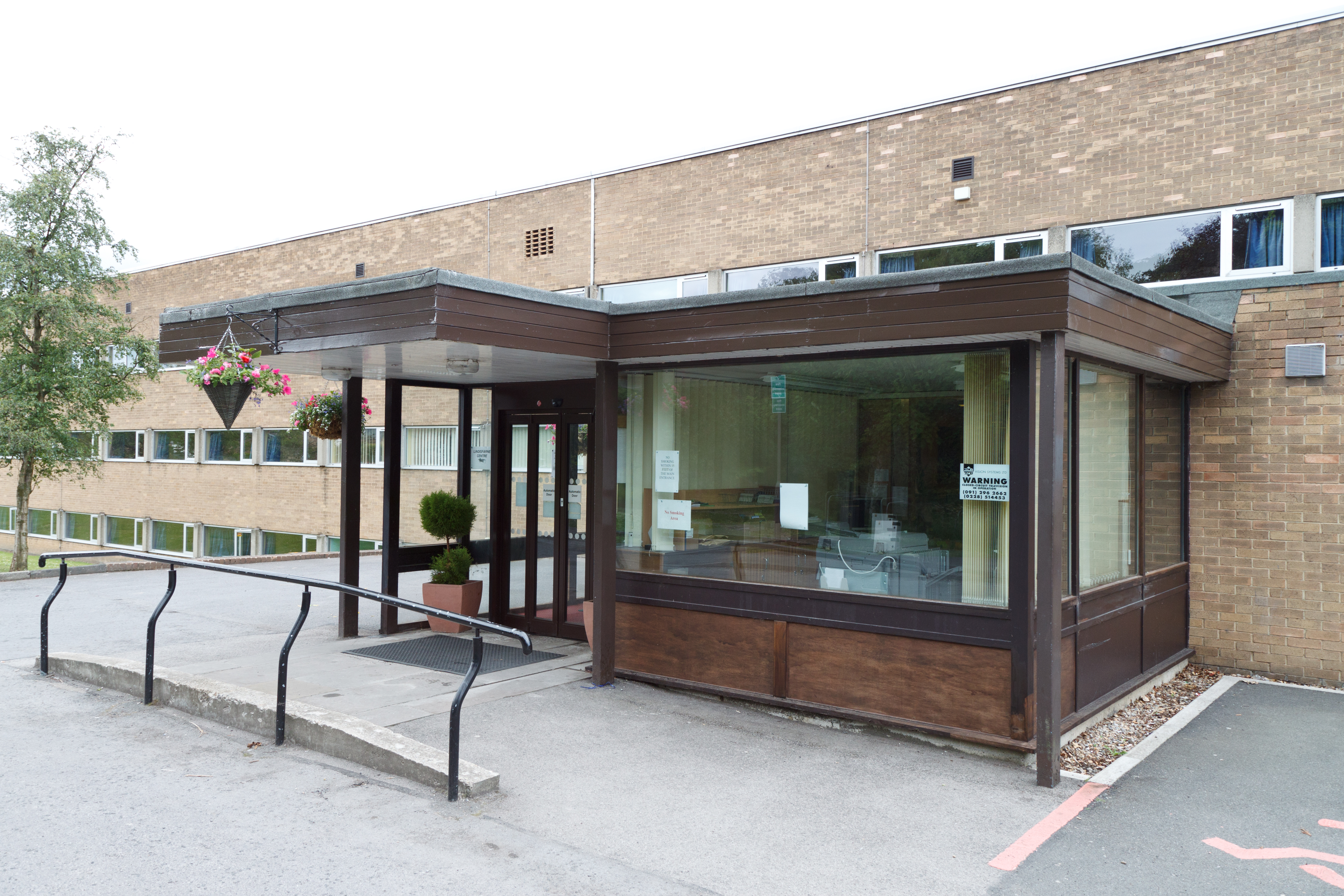
St Aidan's College entrance

The college membership divides itself between the senior common room (SCR) and the junior common room (JCR). The SCR is a self-regulating body of senior members of the university, college officers, tutors and postgraduate students. The JCR consists of the undergraduate members of the college and elects its own officers, including a sabbatical president and a bar steward, who liaise on its behalf with the college and university.

=== Principals ===
The current principal is Susan Frenk, a lecturer in Spanish and Latin-American culture.

- Ethleen Scott (1947–1963)
- Dame Enid Russell-Smith (1963–1970)
- Irene Hindmarsh (1970–1988)
- Robert Williams (1991–1997)
- John Ashworth (1998–2007)
- Susan Frenk (2007–present)

== Student life ==
The JCR operates a range of different sports clubs and societies which are run by different student volunteers.

The JCR operates an annual charity fashion show. In 2022, there was controversy over the decision to support a Ugandan literacy charity, the Literate Earth Project (LEP), that was reported in the student and national press.

=== Sports ===
St Aidan's College participates in the intercollegiate football league. There are six men's and one women's team. The Women's A team is joint with Hatfield college and are in the women's premiership division. The men's A and B team are both in Men's Division 1, men's C team is in Division 3, men's D & F team in division 6A and the men's E team in division 6B.

St Aidan's College Boat Club (SACBC) was founded in 1954. Today the club racks boats in University College Boat Club's boathouse. The club competes with other colleges through Durham College Rowing events and Durham Regatta.

St Aidan's College Rugby Football Club participates in Division 1 of the intercollegiate leagues. For many years, the club played in the Premiership and even won the Floodlit Cup in 2018, winning 27-20 in the final against Hatfield College.

== Notable alumni ==
- Jon Ashworth MP – Member of Parliament for Leicester South (2011–2024)
- Josh Beaumont – Sale Sharks and England national rugby union team professional rugby player
- Sir Graham Brady MP – Conservative Member of Parliament for Altrincham and Sale West (1997–2024)
- Monica Grady – Professor of Planetary and Space Science at the Open University
- Judith Hann – freelance broadcaster and writer, former Tomorrow's World presenter
- Shona McIsaac MP – Labour Member of Parliament for Cleethorpes (1997–2010)
- Nick Mohammed – comedian and actor
- Stéphanie Nicolle – Adjunct Professor of Immovable Property, Institute of Law, Jersey (2009–2012); HM Solicitor General for Jersey (1994–2008)
- Dame Caroline Swift – leading counsel to the Inquiry in the Shipman Inquiry and Justice of the High Court (Kings Bench Division)
- Becky Smethurst - British astrophysicist, author, and YouTuber who is a junior research fellow at the University of Oxford.

== Sources ==
- Rodmell, Graham. St Aidans: from Home Students to Society to College. University of Durham, 1997. ISBN 0-9530465-0-8
- Kelly, Frank. Aidan's students protest collective punishment for fire door damage. Palatinate, 24 February 2022, No.849.
