= Nicolle =

Nicolle is a feminine given name and a surname.

== Given name ==
- Nicolle Bruderer (born 1993), Guatemalan racing cyclist
- Nicolle Dickson (born 1969), Australian actress
- Nicolle Flint (born 1978), Australian politician
- Nicolle Galyon (born 1984), American country music singer and songwriter
- Nicolle Gonzales (born 1980), Navajo certified midwife
- Nicolle Grasse, 21st century American politician
- Nicolle Jean Leary (born 1983), stage name Nikki Jean, American singer-songwriter
- Nicolle Ndiweni (born 1989), Zimbabwean politician
- Nicolle Payne (born 1976), American water polo player
- Nicolle Van Den Broeck (1946–2017), Belgian racing cyclist
- Nicolle Wallace (born 1972), American political commentator and author, former White House Communications Director
- Nicolle Zacchia (born 2010), Brazilian rhythmic gymnast
- Nicolle Zellner, American astronomer, planetary scientist, and astrobiologist

== Surname ==
- André Nicolle (1885–1945), French film actor
- Billy Nicolle (fl. 1927), New Zealand footballer
- Charles Nicolle (1866–1936), French bacteriologist and Nobel laureate
- David Nicolle (born 1944), British military historian
- Dean Nicolle (born 1974), Australian botanist, arborist, and ecologist
- Ethan Nicolle fl. 1995–present), American comic book creator
- Hilgrove Clement Nicolle (1855–1908), British civil servant
- Hostes Nicolle (1912–?), Rhodesian civil servant
- Jason Nicolle (born 1965), English former squash player
- Jean Nicolle (1614–1650), French Norman painter and musician
- Jenny Nicolle (fl. 1986–1994), former international lawn bowler from Guernsey
- Jordane Nicolle (born 1982), Zimbabwean cricketer
- Jorge Carpio Nicolle (1932–1993), Guatemalan politician and newspaper publisher
- Louis Nicolle (1871–1942), French politician and Minister of Health
- Louise Nicolle, French Catholic layperson who devoted her life to helping the poor and women
- Maurice Nicolle (1862–1932), French physician and microbiologist
- Michelle Nicolle, Australian jazz singer
- Stéphanie Nicolle (born 1948), Jersey lawyer
- Victor-Jean Nicolle (1754–1826), French painter

== See also ==
- Nicolle Tower, Jersey
