= Saint Felix School =

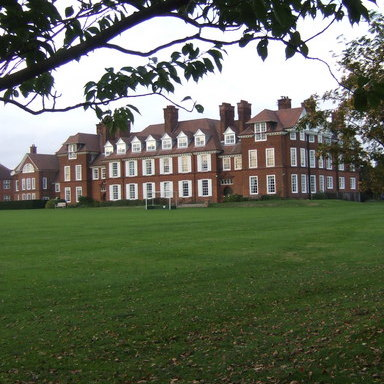

Location
- Halesworth Road, Reydon; Southwold, Suffolk, IP18 6SD; England; 52.33473°N 1.65489°E

Information
- Type: Private, day and boarding school
- Motto: Latin: Felix Quia Fortis (Happiness Through Strength)
- Established: 1897; 129 years ago
- Founder: Margaret Isabella Gardiner
- Local authority: Suffolk County Council
- Department for Education URN: 124868 Tables
- Headmaster: Matthew Oakman
- Gender: Mixed
- Age range: 2–18
- Enrolment: 301 (2018)
- Capacity: 319
- Houses: Kay; Pemberton; Rowell; Edmond
- Colour: Green Blue Gold
- Alumni: Old Felicians
- Website: www.stfelix.co.uk

Saint Felix School is a 2–18 mixed, private, day and boarding school in Reydon, Southwold, Suffolk, England. The school was founded in 1897 as a school for girls but is now co-educational.

== History ==
The school was founded in 1897 as a girls' school by Margaret Isabella Gardiner.

By September 1902, the present site of the school had been purchased and the first four boarding houses and teaching block completed. In 1909 Lucy Mary Silcox took over as headmistress from the founding head. The student roll grew and in 1910, the Gardiner Assembly Hall and a Library were built and Clough House followed in 1914.

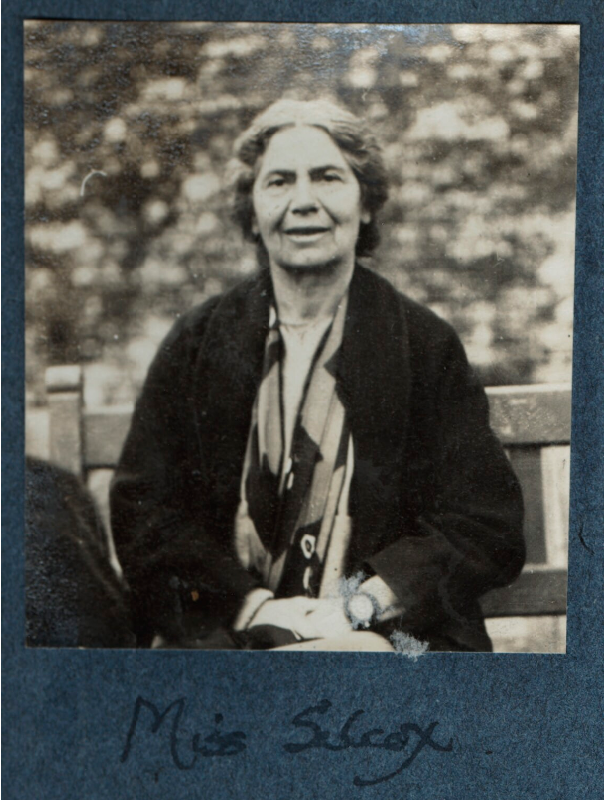
Miss Silcox by Lady Ottoline Morrell in 1925

Silcox was able to bring leading thinkers and artists to the school and money was found to buy sculpture and paintings. The modernist paintings inspired pupils like the artist Gwyneth Johnstone who remembered seeing work by Christopher Wood at the school. Silcox directed the girls in ancient Greek plays. The students knew she was President of the local National Union of Women's Suffrage Societies as she gave talks in surrounding villages in support of women gaining the vote. The school continued during the 1914–18 war and during the 1916–1917 school year there was an outpost of the school at Penmaenmawr as some parents were worried about their students' safety. The whole school was evacuated three times and the school took in some Serbian refugees.

== Today ==
The school accommodates toddlers from 2 years of age in the Little Saint Felix Nursery, and children up to the age of 18 in the Sixth Form. The school offers boarding throughout the term, weekly, or 'flexi' boarding. Having joined the School in September 2023, Mr Matthew Oakman is the current Head.

== Notable former pupils ==
- Griselda Allan – artist
- Jane Benham MBE – artist and sailor who worked to preserve Thames sailing barges
- Dorothea Braby – artist and illustrator
- Dorothy Elizabeth Bradford – painter
- Stella Browne – feminist and abortion law reformer
- Natalie Caine – woodwind player
- Constance Coltman – the first woman ordained to Christian ministry in Britain
- Katherine Laird Cox – model, magistrate
- Nora David, Baroness David – politician and life peer
- William Ellard – swimmer
- Phyllis Gardner – artist and dog breeder
- Nick Griffin – Former BNP leader and MEP for North West England (1999–2014)
- Lilias Rider Haggard MBE – daughter of Sir Henry Rider Haggard and an author in her own right
- Norman Heatley OBE – biochemist
- Gwyneth Johnstone – painter
- Emily Beatrix Coursolles Jones – novelist
- Nancy Lyle – tennis player
- Violet Helen Millar, later Countess Attlee, wife of Clement Attlee
- Mother Maribel of Wantage – Anglican nun and artist
- Anna Russell – singer and comedian
- Enid Russell-Smith DBE – civil servant
- Mary Snell-Hornby – translation scholar
- Constance Tipper – metallurgist and crystallographer
- Hannah Waterman – actress
- Dame Barbara Woodward – diplomat
- Sonia Tumiotto, athlete and influencer

== Notable staff ==
- Lucy Mary Silcox, headmistress from 1909 to 1926
- Anne Mustoe, headmistress from 1978 to 1987
- Ivey Dickson, pianist

== See also ==
- List of schools in Suffolk
