= Garsington Manor =

English country house

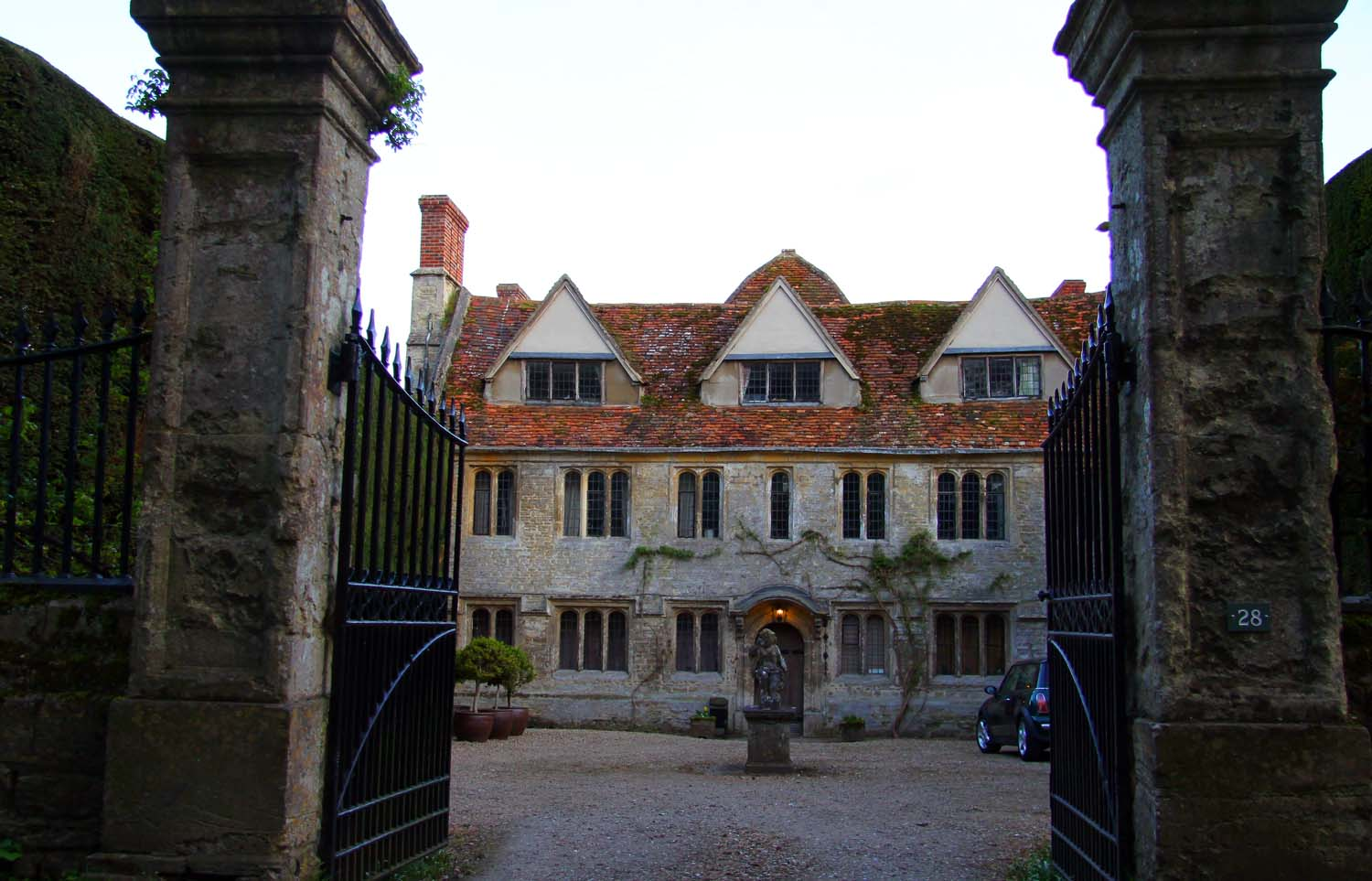

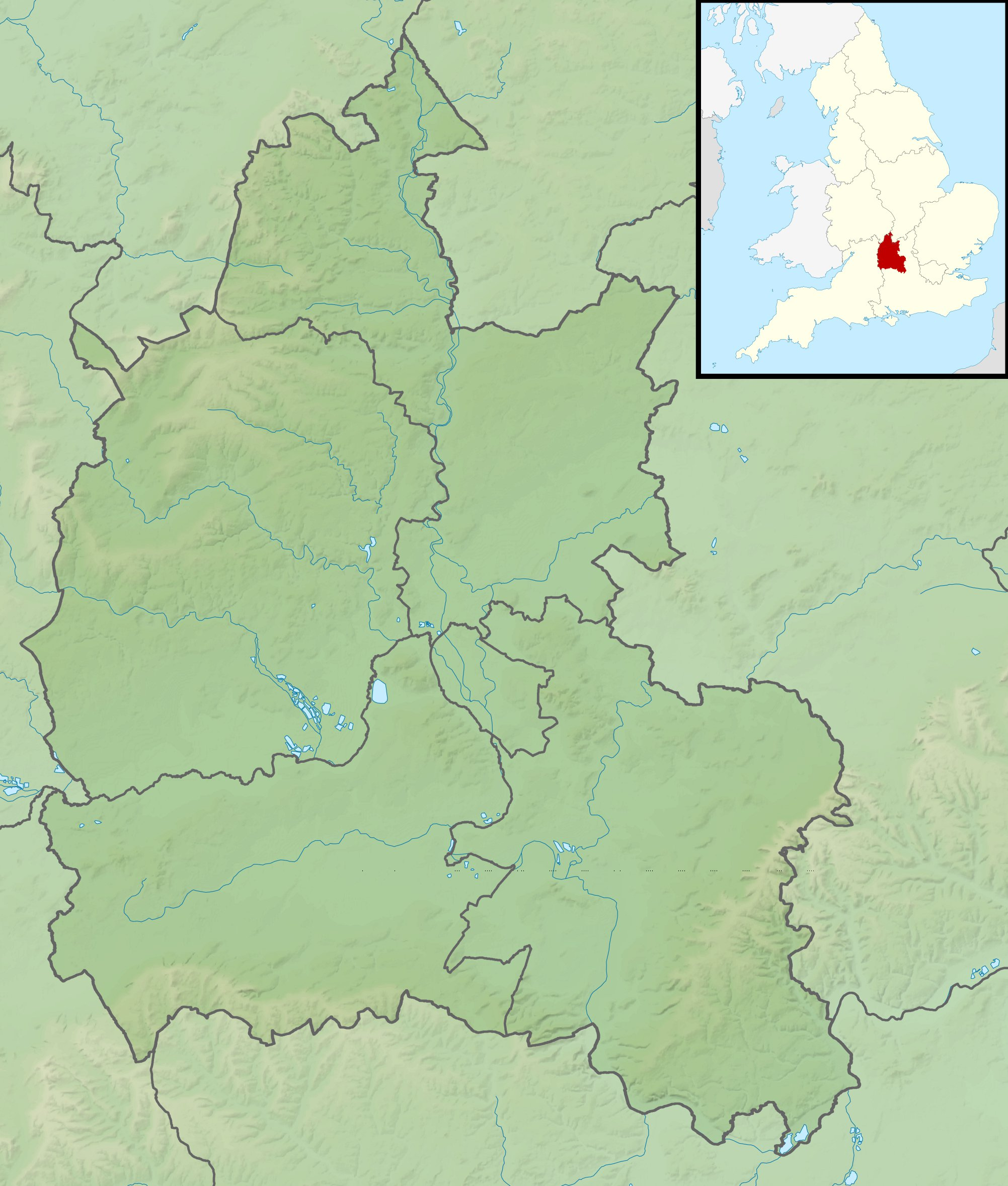
- Location within Oxfordshire
- 51.7133°N 1.1587°W
- Type: House
- Location: Garsington, Oxfordshire OX44 9DH

History
- Built: 17th century, with later alterations

Site notes
- Architectural style: Vernacular
- Governing body: Privately owned

Listed Building – Grade II*
- Official name: Manor House, Garsington
- Designated: 18 July 1963
- Reference no.: 1047686

Listed Building – Grade II
- Official name: Gatepiers, walls, gates and railings to forecourt of manor house
- Designated: 25 October 1984
- Reference no.: 1181670

Listed Building – Grade II
- Official name: Pool, summer house and statuary 60M south of manor house
- Designated: 25 October 1984
- Reference no.: 1047689

Listed Building – Grade II
- Official name: Stables 30M northeast of manor house
- Designated: 25 October 1984
- Reference no.: 1047688

Listed Building – Grade II
- Official name: Former bakehouse and attached outbuilding 10M northwest of manor house
- Designated: 25 October 1984
- Reference no.: 1047687

Garsington Manor, in the village of Garsington, near Oxford, England, is a country house, dating from the 17th century. Its fame derives principally from its owner in the early 20th century, the "legendary Ottoline Morrell, who held court from 1915 to 1924".

Members of the Bloomsbury Group, the aristocratic Ottoline, and her wealthy husband Philip, were friends with an array of artists, writers and intellectuals, D. H. Lawrence, T. S. Eliot, E. M. Forster, Bertrand Russell, Aldous Huxley, Virginia Woolf, Siegfried Sassoon, Stanley and Gilbert Spencer being among the visitors to their house. The manor was later owned by Leonard Ingrams and from 1989 to 2010 was the setting for an annual summer opera season, the Garsington Opera, which relocated to Wormsley Park in 2011. Garsington is a Grade II* listed building.

== History ==
The manor house was built on land once owned by the son of the poet Geoffrey Chaucer, and at one time had the name "Chaucers". It was constructed in the 1630s by a William Wyckham. Lady Ottoline and her husband, Philip Morrell, bought the manor house in 1913, at which time it was in a state of disrepair, having been in use as a farmhouse. They paid £8,450. Their moving in was delayed until May 1915, due to the continuing occupancy by the former tenants.

Garsington became a haven for the Morrells’ friends, including D. H. Lawrence, Siegfried Sassoon, Edward Sackville-West, Lord David Cecil, Lytton Strachey, Aldous Huxley, Mark Gertler, Bertrand Russell, Virginia Woolf, T. S. Eliot, E. M. Forster and Walter de la Mare. (Note: Similarly generous hospitality was dispensed at the Morrell's London home, 44 Bedford Square.) In 1916, they invited conscientious objectors, including Clive Bell and other members of the Bloomsbury Group, to come and work on the home farm for the duration of World War I, as civilian work classified as being of national importance was recognised as an alternative to military service.

Aldous Huxley spent some time at Garsington before he wrote Crome Yellow, a book which contains a caricature based on Ottoline for which she never forgave him. His pen portrait of her, written after their first meeting in 1915, summarises the aspects of her character which both attracted and repelled; "[She] is quite an incredible creature - arty beyond the dreams of avarice and a patroness of literature and the modern. She is intelligent, but her affectation is overwhelming". Huxley was not the only one of Ottoline's friends to mock her in print. Her affair with a stonemason Lionel Gomme, known as "Tiger", who worked on the statuary at Garsington, has been cited by some critics as the basis for Lawrence's portrayal of Lady Chatterley's affair with the gamekeeper, Mellors in his novel of 1928. (Note: Gomme died of a brain haemorrhage in the stables at Garsington two years after the start of their affair.) Lawrence portrayed her even more directly as Lady Hermione Roddice, in his novel Women in Love. The savagery of the depiction caused a decades-long breach in their friendship, and Philip Morrell threatened to sue Lawrence's publishers.

In Confidence, a short story by Katherine Mansfield, portrays the "wits of Garsington" some four years before Crome Yellow. Not everyone found the atmosphere congenial; the shy poet Cecil Day-Lewis, taken to Garsington by his tutor Maurice Bowra, (Note: While guests at Garsington, Bowra read Eliot’s then unpublished manuscript of The Waste Land.) found it "a tremendous ordeal" and sought refuge "slinking gloomily amongst the peacocks" in the Italianate gardens. Lytton Strachey complained that the constant coming and going of guests made work impossible: "I sit quivering among a surging mesh of pugs, peacocks, pianolas, and humans - if humans they can be called - the inhabitants of Circe's cave". David Garnett, a writer, and lover of a number of Ottoline's guests, recorded his impressions of Garsington in his autobiography; "Ottoline's pack of pug dogs trotted everywhere and added to the Beardsley quality, which was one half of her natural taste. The characteristic of every house in which Ottoline lived was its smell and the smell of Garsington was stronger than that of Bedford Square. It reeked of the bowls of potpourri and orris root which stood on every mantelpiece, side table and window-sill and of the desiccated oranges, studded with cloves, which Ottoline loved making".

The Morrells restored the house in the 1920s, working with the architect Philip Tilden, and creating landscaped Italian-style gardens. The parterre has 24 square beds with Irish yews at the corners; the Italian garden has a large ornamental pool enclosed by yew hedges and set with statues. This was designed by Charles Edward Mallows; beyond, is a wild garden, with lime-tree avenues, shrubs, a stream and pond. Financial difficulties forced the Morrells to sell Garsington in 1928. The house was subsequently bought by Sir John Wheeler-Bennett, the historian, who lived there until his death in 1975. It was sold in 1981 to Leonard Ingrams, a banker and brother of Richard. Following Leonard Ingrams' death in 2012, the house was again sold.

== Architecture and description ==
The house is a rectangular structure, of two storeys with attics. The building material is limestone rubble. In his memoirs, True Remembrances-the memoirs of an architect, Philip Tilden recorded the unobtrusive style he sought to achieve at Garsington; "I doubt whether the present-day visitor could spot these alterations, they were made out of odd bits, and the workmanship was carried out by men of the old school". (Note: Despite its title, James Bettley, in his monograph on the architect, notes that Tilden's autobiography contains many falsehoods and is "highly unreliable".)

Garsington is a Grade II* listed building, and its gardens are also grade II* on the Register of Historic Parks and Gardens. A number of other buildings on the estate, and landscaping features in the gardens have Grade II listings including the stables, the bakehouse, the gates at the forecourt to the manor, the pool, a summer house and statuary and an 18th-century dovecote.

== Sources ==
- Bettley, James (1987). Lush and Luxurious: the life and work of Philip Tilden 1887–1956. Royal Institute of British Architects. OCLC 466189961.
- Caws, Mary Ann; Wright, Sarah Bird (1999). Bloomsbury and France: Art and Friends. Oxford: Oxford University Press. ISBN 978-0-198-02781-2.
- Darroch, Sandra J. (2017). Garsington Manor: The Legend of Lady Ottoline Morrell. East Barnet, Herts, UK: John Libbey. ISBN 978-0-861-96941-8.
- Lattin, Don (2012). Distilled Spirits: Getting high, then sober, with a famous writer, a forgotten philosopher, and a hopeless drunk. Berkeley, US: University of California Press. ISBN 9780520272323.
- Mansfield, Katherine (1984). Antony Alpers (ed.). The Stories of Katherine Mansfield. Auckland, NZ: Oxford University Press. ISBN 978-0-195-58191-1. OCLC 905796603.
- Mitchell, Leslie (2010). Maurice Bowra: A Life. Oxford: Oxford University Press. ISBN 978-0-199-58933-3.
- Morrell, Ottoline (1963). Robert Gathorne-Hardy (ed.). Ottoline: The Early Memoirs of Lady Ottoline Morrell. London: Faber & Faber. OCLC 1229196175.
- Morrell, Ottoline (1974). Robert Gathorne-Hardy (ed.). Ottoline At Garsington: Memoirs of Lady Ottoline Morrell. London: Faber & Faber. OCLC 185358935.
- Sherwood, Jennifer; Pevsner, Nikolaus (2002). Oxfordshire. The Buildings of England. New Haven, US and London: Yale University Press. ISBN 0-300-09639-9.
- Stanford, Peter (2007). C. Day-Lewis: A Life. London: Bloomsbury. ISBN 978-1-441-12056-4.
- Strong, Roy (1996). Country Life 1897-1997: The English Arcadia. London: Bloomsbury. ISBN 978-0-752-21054-4. OCLC 940142624.
- Tilden, Philip (1954). True Remembrances: The memoirs of an architect. London: Country Life. OCLC 636818090.
