= Caroline Swift =

British barrister and former High Court judge

Dame Caroline Swift DBE
- Royal coat of arms of the United Kingdom

Justice of the High Court
- In office 2005–2015

Personal details
- Born: Caroline Jane Swift; 30 May 1955 (age 71)
- Spouse: Peter Openshaw
- Education: St Aidan's College, Durham
- Occupation: Judge
- Profession: Barrister

Dame Caroline Jane Swift, Lady Openshaw, DBE (born 30 May 1955), formerly styled The Hon. Mrs Justice Swift, is a British barrister and former High Court judge. She was leading counsel to the Inquiry in the Shipman Inquiry, which began in 2001.

== Education ==
Swift was educated at St Aidan's College, Durham University where she was the President of the Durham Union Society.

== Career ==
She was called to the Bar by the Inner Temple in 1977. The following year she began practising on the Northern Circuit, later becoming Assistant Recorder from 1992 until 1995, and QC in 1993. She became a Recorder in 1995, and was elected a Bencher of the Inner Temple in 1997.

On 4 November 2005, Swift was created a DBE upon her appointment as a Justice of the High Court (Queen's Bench Division). Her husband, Sir Peter Openshaw, is also a High Court Judge, and was sworn in on the same day.

Swift retired from the High Court on 1 August 2015. From 1 January 2017 Swift was appointed to the position of chair of the Medical Practitioners Tribunal Service.

== See also ==
- List of Durham University people
