= Peter Openshaw (judge) =

Sir Charles Peter Lawford Openshaw, DL (born 1947), styled The Hon. Mr Justice Openshaw, is a retired judge of the High Court, Queen's Bench Division.

== Early life ==
Openshaw was educated at Harrow School and St Catharine's College, Cambridge.

== Legal career ==
Openshaw was called to the bar by the Inner Temple in 1970. On 9 April 1991, he was appointed a Queen's Counsel (QC).

On 16 March 1999, Openshaw was appointed a Circuit Judge. He was appointed the Honorary Recorder of Preston in 1999 and served for seven years.

In September 2005, he was appointed as a High Court Judge and assigned to the Queen's Bench Division. In 2005, he became a member of the Criminal Procedure Rules Committee. He is no longer on the Committee. Between 2008 and 2012, he was a presiding judge of the North Eastern Circuit. He was made a Bencher of the Inner Temple in 2003.

He came to the attention of media when he said "The trouble is I don’t understand the language. I don’t really understand what a website is." during the trial of Younes Tsouli, Waseem Mughal, and Tariq al-Daour. The Judicial Communications Office later explained that he was clarifying the evidence presented for the court, not for himself.

On 25 November 2016, he presided over the sentencing of Stephen Port who was found guilty of the four murders, 10 offences of administering a substance with intent, four rapes and four sexual assaults. Port was sentenced to life imprisonment with a whole life order for the four murders committed between June 2014 and September 2015.

He sat as the Judge in the Hillsborough criminal trial R v Duckenfield and R v Mackrell at Preston Crown Court between January 2019 and April 2019.

== Personal life ==
Openshaw is married to Dame Caroline Swift. They were sworn in as High Court judges on the same day in October 2005.

He was the son of Judge William Harrison Openshaw, and his wife, Joyce. Judge William was murdered on 11 May 1981 by John Smith, whom the judge had sent to a borstal for 18 months in 1968 for theft of scrap metal. Smith hid in the judge's garage in Broughton, Lancashire, and stabbed him 12 times. Smith was caught, tried, and convicted of murder in November 1981, and sentenced to life with a minimum of 25 years served.

In 2008, Peter Openshaw sentenced killer Daniel Breaks to 30 years, one day after the latter promised to escape custody and kill him. The judge turned to the jury and said he doubted that would happen.

== Honours ==
On 10 May 2000, Openshaw was appointed a Deputy Lieutenant (DL) for Lancashire. In 2008, he was appointed a lay canon of Blackburn Cathedral.

He was knighted upon being appointed as a high court judge.
