= Medical Practitioners Tribunal Service =

Tribunal in the United Kingdom

The Medical Practitioners Tribunal Service (MPTS) is a tribunal in the United Kingdom that adjudicates on complaints made against doctors, making independent decisions about their fitness to practise. This includes imposing sanctions for decisions about violations of ethical principles.

== Background ==
One of the recommendations in the fifth report of The Shipman Inquiry, which was published in December 2004, was for the adjudication stage of fitness to practise procedures to be undertaken by a body that is independent of the General Medical Council (GMC). In 2007 the UK Government released a white paper on The Regulation of Health Professionals. In late 2010 the Department of Health consulted on plans to create a body that was separate from the health regulators, to adjudicate on fitness to practise matters.

On 2 December 2010, the government announced that they had decided not to proceed with an Office of the Health Professions Adjudicator (OHPA).

In July 2011, the GMC approved proposals to separate its presentation of fitness to practise cases from their adjudication. The adjudication would become the responsibility of a new body, the Medical Practitioners Tribunal Service.

== History ==
In June 2012 the MPTS assumed responsibility for medical tribunals, with their panels given the power to remove or suspend a doctor's ability to work within the UK. It was expected that the service would handle some 340 doctors' fitness-to-practise hearings a year. The MPTS was located in a dedicated hearing centre in Manchester which has 16 hearing rooms.

There were changes in the records kept, with the use of digital recordings, instead of shorthand writers. Specialist advisers were used less often, only in exceptional circumstances.

In March 2015, changes to the Medical Act meant that the GMC gained the ability to appeal against decisions made by the MPTS.

In 2014, legislation was introduced, and the GMC gained powers around demanding proof of competence in English from doctors coming from within the EU. In October of the following year, the first doctors from the EU were disciplined following inadequate performances in tests that the MPTS itself had requested.

== Chair ==
David Pearl became the first Chair of the Medical Practitioners Tribunal Service on 11 June 2012, after being appointed through an independent process in February of that year. Caroline Swift succeeded him as chair in August 2016.

== Hearings and procedure ==
=== Introduction ===
There two main types of hearing constituted by the MPTS: interim orders tribunals and medical practitioners tribunals.

Medical Practitioners Tribunals can be further divided into new fitness to practise hearings, review hearings, restoration hearings, and non-compliance hearings.

=== Interim Order Tribunals ===
Upon the GMC commencing an investigating they may at any stage make a referral to the Interim Orders Tribunal ("IOT") to restrict a doctor's practise and registration. As its name suggests the IOT is an interim process. For example, if the allegation is that a doctor's health is causing practise difficulties, the GMC may seek a condition limiting hours of work while they investigate.

The restrictions may be imposed if it is found that it is necessary to protect the public, protect a doctor or their health or it is in the public interest to do so because proper standards of behaviour or confidence in the profession must be protected.

The hearings are likely to take place remotely by Microsoft Teams and they are usually private.

They may be public only if it is in the public interest or a doctor requests it is heard publicly. The Tribunal consists of a legally qualified chair, a medically qualified tribunal member and a lay member.

If the IOT does decide some restriction is necessary it may only be for a maximum of 18 months.

The GMC must apply to one of the higher civil courts if they believe it must be extended beyond 18 months.

Any order should be proportionate to the perceived risk and it should be no longer than necessary for the investigation and/or MPTS hearing to complete.

If an order is imposed on a doctor then it must be reviewed at 6 monthly intervals.

A review can take place on the papers where there is agreement between the doctor and the GMC.

The MPTS publish decisions they take when an interim order is granted. It is published on the MPTS website and the GMC Register but there will be no publication of a doctor's health matters.

=== New Fitness to Practice hearings ===
The GMC will refer a case to the MPTS for a hearing if they believe the allegation is such that a doctor's fitness to practise is impaired, this can be proven and the likely sanction is one of the more serious ones beyond an undertaking or a warning that they can impose.

Before the hearing directions will be given either directly by the MPTS or at case management hearings. The purpose of these hearings is to ensure that all preparations are made for the substantive hearing.

The hearing itself will be listed with at least 28 day's notice to the doctor and the final form of the allegations will have been sent to the doctor by the GMC.

The hearing will take place before a Tribunal of three members comprising a legal qualified chair, a medically qualified member and a lay member. A clerk will record the hearing and assist with arrangements.

If there are any preliminary issues, they are dealt with first. For example, any legal arguments or final amendments to the allegations. There are occasions where these issues alone take a day or more to deal with.

The first stage is the facts stage, in the ordinary run of cases the GMC will go first, setting out the allegations, calling their witnesses who will be sworn in and confirm their statements. Assuming the doctor is in attendance they will then be cross-examined by the doctor with the purpose of testing their evidence and as required disputing facts, highlighting weaknesses or putting to them the doctor's version of events.

If at the end of the GMC's case the evidence is such that the allegations appear unprovable a doctor can make an application to discontinue the case under Rule 17(2)(g).

If the case does proceed a doctor can adduce relevant evidence and any witnesses in support of their defence. They will likely be cross-examined by the GMC's representative. If the facts in the allegation are not proven the case will conclude.

A doctor may elect not to provide evidence but may risk an adverse inference being drawn from the omission.

If no facts are found proved the hearing ends.

If some or all of the facts in the allegation/s are found proved the MPT will move to consider whether a doctor's fitness to practise is impaired which is Stage 2 of the hearing process.

This is referenced in Rule 17(2)(k) of the 2004 Rules,

although there is no statutory definition of what constitutes 'impairment'. The MPT's frequently refer to Dame Janet Smith in the fifth Shipman Report, as adopted by the High Court in CHRE v NMC and Paula Grant [2011] EWCH 297 Admin. In particular, the Tribunal consider whether the findings of fact show that a doctor's fitness to practise is impaired in the sense that a doctor

1. Has in the past acted and/or is liable in the future to act so as to put a patient or patients at unwarranted risk of harm; and/or
2. Has in the past brought and/or is liable in the future to bring the medical profession into disrepute; and/or
3. Has in the past breached and/or is liable in the future to breach one of the fundamental tenets of the medical profession.

The MPTS maintain decisions publicly for a period of one year.

If the MPT decide that fitness to practise is not impaired they will consider whether a Warning ought to be issued.

If the MPT decide that fitness to practise is impaired they will consider what Sanction should be imposed on a doctor.

=== Review hearings ===
Where a doctor has been suspended or their registration has been subject to conditions at a fitness to practise hearing it usually follows that the Tribunal will list a review hearing to reconsider the sanction and safe resumption of practise.

The review hearing is not another opportunity to challenge or test the facts in relation to the allegation; the review Tribunal will review the findings of the fitness to practise tribunal or any previous review tribunal.

Review Hearings are usually heard in public except where a doctor's health is in issue or there are other reasons in the public interest warranting privacy.

It is also possible that a hearing can take place 'on the papers'. This is where an MPT is not attended by the doctor or any representatives but the case is considered by reviewing the evidence on the papers only.

Unless there are any preliminary matters, the first stage of the hearing is whether a doctor's fitness to practise remains impaired.

The GMC will set out their position and then the doctor their position. In terms of evidence a doctor may include certificates of courses they have attended, statements from colleagues, written reflections, PDPs and witness statements which address the concerns following from the fitness to practise hearing or previous review hearing.

If the Tribunal determine fitness to practise is no longer impaired they will decide that no further sanction is necessary and it should follow the sanction will be revoked. It may not be revoked immediately because it may have a short time remaining and they may feel it ought to continue to its expiry. The Tribunal do however have a discretion and submissions can be made as to the period of revocation.

If the Tribunal determine that a doctor's fitness to practise remains impaired the next stage is to consider if any sanction should be imposed. Here the Tribunal must consider what sanction if any is appropriate and they have to be considered in order of increasing severity.

At the sanctions stage of the hearing both the GMC and the doctor can make, submissions, adduce evidence and address the MPT on what they consider is the appropriate sanction decision.

At the end of each stage the MPT will announce its decision giving reasons for its conclusions.

=== Restoration Hearings ===
A restoration hearing will determine whether a doctor is fit to be restored to the medical register.

They may arise from an application following a disciplinary erasure, an administrative erasure or a voluntary erasure.

Restoration hearings are usually heard in public unless they concern a doctor's health or there are some other factors that outweigh the public interest and warrant a private hearing.

Where the erasure was a disciplinary erasure the Restoration hearing is not another opportunity to challenge or test the facts in relation to the allegation; the restoration Tribunal will review the findings of the fitness to practise tribunal or any previous review tribunal and consider carefully current fitness to practise.

The MPT will hear from the GMC as to the background to the case, hear from the doctor, any relevant evidence and submissions and shall announce its decision whether to grant or refuse the application to restore.

== Sanctions ==
Before any sanction is considered the GMC or MPTS must first be satisfied that a doctor's fitness to practise is currently impaired. If there is no impairment then a tribunal cannot impose a sanction, though they can and should consider whether a Warning should be issued where a doctor significantly departs from Good Medical Practice.

If an MPTS finds that fitness to practise has been impaired and action needs to be taken with a sanction imposed, a doctor may receive a Warning, have Conditions imposed on their licence to practice, be suspended from practise or face Erasure from Register in the most serious of cases.

It is not the primary purpose of sanctions to punish doctors. Though they may be punitive, the ostensible purposes of sanctions are to protect the public, maintain confidence in the profession and maintain standards in the profession. When assessing sanction, the Tribunal should start by considering the least restrictive and act proportionately. The aggravating and mitigating factors must also be considered.

A Warning is a formal warning issued by the MPTS which is a formal response to mark a lapse. A warning is not action on a doctor's registration (in the way that conditions or undertakings are) because it does not restrict medical practice.

They are published on the medical register. A warning stays on the register for two years after which time they are removed and no longer disclosed to general enquirers.

Conditions are an action on a doctor's registration, they will impose a limit or prescribe conditions that a doctor must abide by to continue practising lawfully. GMC & MPTS,

Conditions usually relate to performance, health, English knowledge, alcohol or drug use.

The MPTS will suspend a doctor in serious cases where fitness to practise has been impaired and it is compelled to signal the degree of seriousness by so significant a sanction. The MPTS openly acknowledge in their sanctions guidance that suspension is punitive because it prevents a doctor from working during the time of the sanction is in operation.

Pursuant to the Medical Act 1983 the MPTS are permitted to order suspension for up to 12 months. They have a discretion in whether the suspension should be imposed immediately.

Where a doctor has been suspended the suspension can be reviewed and the MPTS will make arrangements and list any reviews where a doctor is to return to practise.

Erasure from the register is the most onerous sanction that can be imposed on a doctor by the MPT and imposed if it is the only means of protecting the public

If a doctor's name is erased from the register following a fitness to practise hearing they may not apply for restoration until five years after the date of erasure and only one application can be made in any twelve-month period.

== Appeals ==
There are a number of types of appeals that can be made against a decision of the MPT. A doctor may appeal as of right, that is without having first to seek permission to appeal, against a decision directing erasure, suspension, conditional registration, varying conditions, restricting the right to apply to make restoration applications or extending periods of suspension or conditions pursuant to Section 40 of the Medical Act 1983.

They must do so within 28 days of being served with the decision.

If the appellant's address in the register is in Scotland, the appeal court is the Court of Session, if the appellant's address in the register is in Northern Ireland the appeal court is the High Court of Justice in Northern Ireland and in the case of any other person, the appeal court is the High Court of Justice in England and Wales.

Appeal time limits are strictly enforced. MPTS tribunals will commonly provide the written judgement at the hearing, it may be posted and it will be published. Any such method will be effective service and time will run from effective service.

The appeal court may dismiss the appeal, allow the appeal and quash the direction or variation appealed against, substitute its decision for one the MPT could have made or remit the case to another MPT and make such order for costs as it sees fit.

The GMC has a right to appeal a MPT decision pursuant to Section 40A of the Medical Act 1983.

The GMC may appeal if they consider a decision is not sufficient for the protection of the public.

The Professional Standards Authority for Health and Social care also has a right to be a party to an appeal pursuant to Section 40B of the Medical Act 1983.

Where the statutory right to appeal is not available the route of last resort is judicial review. The GMC and the MPTS are public bodies which renders their decision potentially amenable to judicial review. Judicial review may fill in the gaps left by Section 40, so that a decision in respect of Warnings could fall within the jurisdiction of judicial review.
