= Garsington Opera =

English country house opera festival

Coordinates: 51°38′37.1″N 0°55′57.4″W

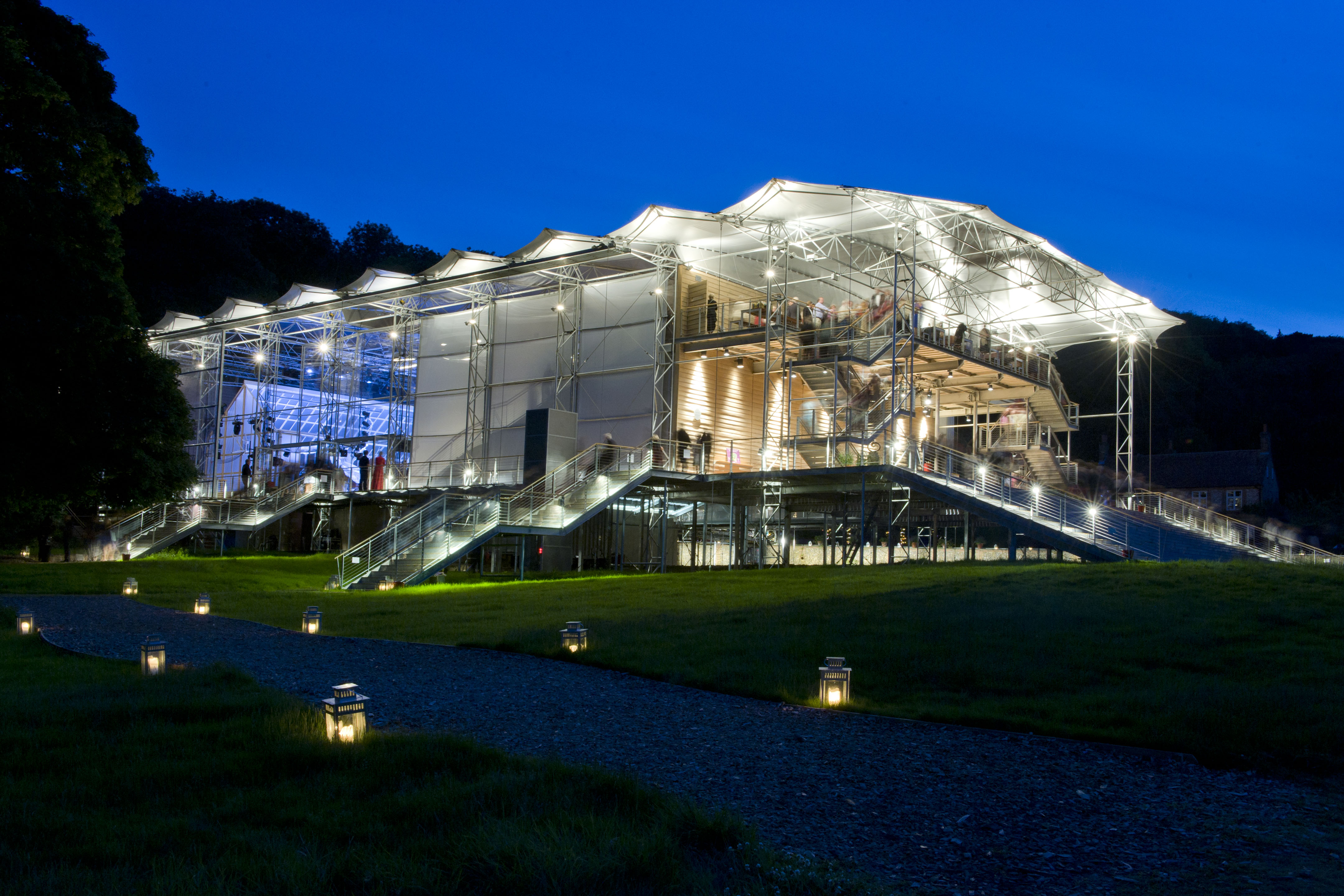
- Interactive map of Garsington Opera
- Address: Wormsley Estate; Stokenchurch, Buckinghamshire; United Kingdom
- Capacity: 600
- Type: Opera house

Construction
- Built: 2011
- Architects: Robin Snell and Partners

Website
- www.garsingtonopera.org

Garsington Opera is an annual summer opera festival founded in 1989 by Leonard Ingrams. The Philharmonia Orchestra and The English Concert are its two resident orchestras. For 21 years it was held in the gardens of Ingrams's home at Garsington Manor in Oxfordshire. Since 2011 the festival is held in Wormsley Park, the home of the Getty family near Stokenchurch in Buckinghamshire, England. After Ingrams's death in 2005 Anthony Whitworth-Jones became its General Director until 2013 when Douglas Boyd became artistic director.

== Opera at Garsington ==
A characteristic feature of Garsington Opera's programming has been the combination of well known operas with discoveries of little known works. These have included the British premieres of Richard Strauss' Die ägyptische Helena, Rossini's La gazzetta and L'equivoco stravagante, and Vivaldi's L'incoronazione di Dario. The festival also gave the first British professional productions of Haydn's La vera costanza, Strauss' Die Liebe der Danae, Janáček's Šárka, and Tchaikovsky's Cherevichki.

Performances take place in the specially designed seasonal Opera Pavilion from within which it is possible to view the surrounding landscape. This maintains the link with the outside, a tradition at Garsington Opera. The performances begin in the early evening, allowing for a long dinner during the interval, similar to Glyndebourne Festival Opera, and evening dress is suggested. Operas are often performed in their original language with English surtitles. In 2017 the Philharmonia Orchestra became a resident orchestra at the Festival, playing for one production per season, with the Garsington Opera Orchestra continuing to play three productions per year. From 2020 the Philharmonia Orchestra and The English Concert became the two resident orchestras, sharing the four productions annually.

== History ==
=== Garsington Manor ===
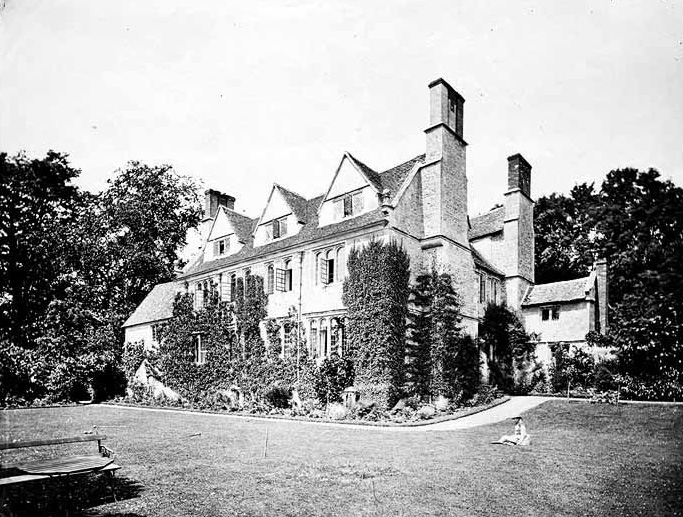
Garsington Manor photographed in 1865 by Henry Taunt

In 1982, financier Leonard Ingrams (brother of Richard Ingrams, the founder of Private Eye) and his wife Rosalind bought Garsington Manor and soon realised the opportunities it offered for outdoor performance. The family became well known for organising this annual season of opera in the manor gardens.

Garsington Manor saw its opera first performance in 1989 when Opera 80 performed Le nozze di Figaro in aid of the Oxford Playhouse. The success of the performance led to the founding of Garsington Opera soon afterwards by Leonard Ingrams. In 1990, the company's first season comprised Mozart's Così fan tutte and the British premiere of Haydn's Orlando paladino. Ingrams asked the Guildhall Strings to play for his new company, and within a few years Garsington Opera had its own orchestra whose core remained the Guildhall Strings.

From 1993 Garsington Opera was staging three opera productions. As demand for the opera grew, a purpose-built raked seating structure for around 500 people was created by architect Robin Snell. The auditorium was noted for its natural acoustic and good sight-lines. The stage was partly covered by a PVC fabric canopy completed in 1995 but was open to the gardens behind. Each year at the end of the season the entire edifice was dismantled and the fabric returned to Architen Landrell, the canopy's designers, for maintenance and storage.

Ingrams also used the barn at Garsington Manor for an annual series of chamber music concerts. He installed into the barn the panelling from the old auditorium at Glyndebourne which was then being thrown out when the new auditorium at Glyndebourne was built. The barn was also used as the restaurant during the opera season, and opera guests could dine in it during the interval. The operas were performed on the stone loggia which overlooks the flower garden, designed and planted by Lady Ottoline Morrell when she owned the Manor during and after the First World War and entertained her famous Bloomsbury guests there e.g. T. S. Eliot, Virginia Woolf, Bertrand Russell, W. B. Yeats.

Sound-proofing screens were later erected around the theatre in response to complaints from a group of Garsington residents living near the Manor. In 1996, they won £1,000 compensation for noise disturbance caused by the operas. When the award was overturned on appeal, local resident Monica Waud led her neighbours in a civil disobedience campaign during the 1997 performance of Haydn's Le Pescatrici. The protesters simultaneously began cutting their lawns with electric lawnmowers and diesel tractors, trimming their hedges, and turning on their hoses. Car alarms were set off and as a grand finale a private plane piloted by Miss Waud's companion flew overhead. In 2001 the protesters tried unsuccessfully to use the Human Rights Act to block Garsington Opera performances, claiming that they denied them the right to the "peaceful enjoyment of their possessions". The South Oxfordshire environmental health service undertook in-house monitoring of opera performances in each season from 2000 through 2005, but on each occasion concluded that there was no statutory noise nuisance.

Leonard Ingrams died from a heart attack on 27 July 2005 at the age of 63. In November of that year, Garsington Opera announced that it would continue, following the appointment of Anthony Whitworth-Jones as General Director. Rosalind Ingrams (Leonard's widow) became president. Anthony Whitworth-Jones had been General Director of the Glyndebourne Festival Opera from 1989 to 1998 and of the Dallas Opera from 2000 to 2002. Whitworth-Jones noted that "under Leonard Ingrams' passionate leadership, (it) has established a reputation for musical excellence, the presentation of some fascinating operatic rarities and the promotion of young singers. I will try to uphold and develop this tradition". In 2006 Leonard's pre-planned and pre-cast repertoire was overseen by Anthony Whitworth-Jones during his first year as artistic director, and the company performed Rimsky-Korsakov's Mayskaja Noch, Donizetti's Don Pasquale, and Der Stein der Weisen (The Philosopher's Stone), a collaborative work by Emanuel Schikaneder, Mozart, and other members of Mozart's circle. In 2007, the Metropolitan Opera in New York staged Garsington's production of Die agyptische Helena, which Leonard Ingrams had put on in 1997. In April 2008, when it became clear that the opera needed more space, the Ingrams family gave notice that the Manor would not be able to host performances after the 2010 season, although the family would continue its support for the company.

=== Wormsley Park ===
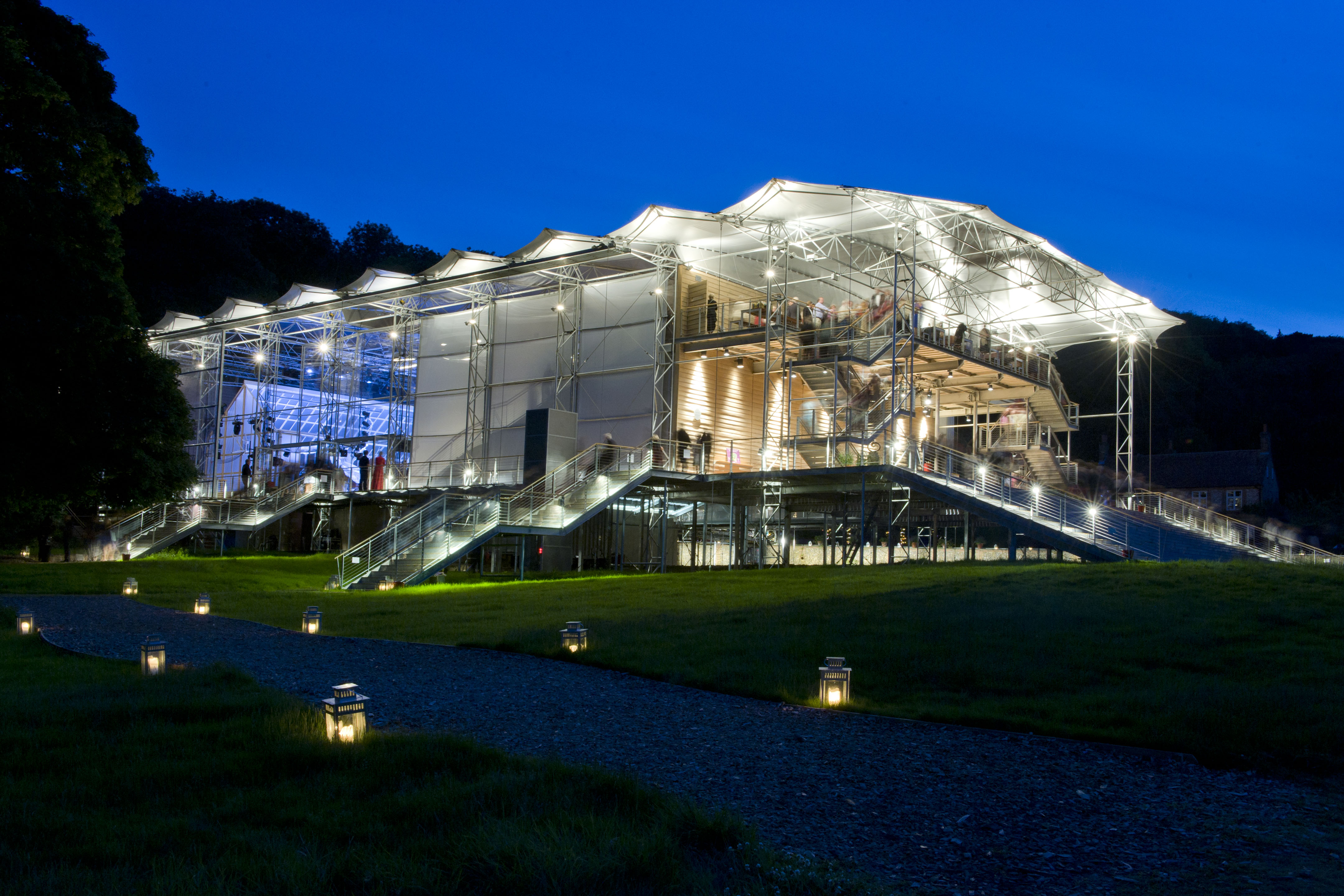
Garsington Opera Pavilion at Wormsley

Garsington Opera announced in April 2010 that it had reached agreement with the Getty family to hold the opera festival at Wormsley Park. The company's new performing space is a 600-seat pavilion situated in the extraordinary surroundings of Wormsley. The first season at Wormsley Park saw the performance of Vivaldi's La verità in cimento in its British premiere, Mozart's The Magic Flute and Rossini's Il turco in Italia. The company is now financed by The Friends of Garsington Opera, corporate and private sponsorship, and the support of foundations.

The 2011 Garsington Opera Pavilion is used for the duration of the opera festival each year and designed by Robin Snell & Partners.

== Awards ==
The 2019 new production of Benjamin Britten's The Turn of the Screw, directed by Louisa Muller and designed by Christopher Oram, won the 2020 Royal Philharmonic Society Music Award for opera and music theatre.

== Notable performers ==
Amongst the notable singers who have performed with the company are Susan Chilcott (The Countess in Le nozze di Figaro, 1993 ) Susan Bullock (Helena in Die ägyptische Helena, 1997) Yvonne Kenny (Christine in Intermezzo, 2001) Matthew Rose (Osmin in Die Entführung aus dem Serail, 2013) Lesley Garrett (Despina in Così fan tutte, 2015) Toby Spence (Idomeneo in Idomeneo, 2016) Roderick Williams (Eugene Onegin in Eugene Onegin, 2016) and Miah Persson (Countess in Capriccio, 2018). Conductors include David Parry, Ivor Bolton, Jane Glover, Jac van Steen, Richard Farnes and the founder of Grange Park Opera, Wasfi Kani.

== Past productions ==
While several productions of operas in the standard repertory are given, those which are rarely given or are national premieres etc. are included here.

- Beethoven
  - Fidelio (2009, 2014, 2020, 2025)
- Britten
  - The Turn of the Screw (1992, 2019, 2022)
  - Albert Herring (1996)
  - A Midsummer Night's Dream (2010, 2024)
  - Death in Venice (2015)
- Dvořák
  - Rusalka (2022)
- Donizetti
  - L'elisir d'amore (2025)
- Händel
  - Amadigi di Gaula (2021)
  - Rodelinda (2025)
- Haydn
  - Orlando paladino (1990, British premiere)
  - Il mondo della luna (1991, 2000)
  - La vera costanza (1992, first British professional production)
  - L'infedeltà delusa (1993)
  - L'incontro improvviso (1994)
  - La fedeltà premiata (1995)
  - Le pescatrici (1997)
- Janáček
  - Šárka (2002, first British professional production)
  - Osud (2002)
- Martinů
  - Mirandolina (2009, British premiere)
- Monteverdi
  - Orfeo (2022)
- Mozart
  - Le Nozze di Figaro (1989, 2024)
  - Così fan tutte (1990, 2022)
  - Die Entführung aus dem Serail (1991)
  - Don Giovanni (1992)
  - Der Schauspieldirektor (1995)
  - Idomeneo (1996, 2016)
  - Lucio Silla (1998)
  - La finta giardiniera (2003)
  - Der Stein der Weisen (2006)
  - Il re pastore (2007)
  - Mitridate, re di Ponto (2023)
- Norman
  - A Trip to the Moon, Community Opera (2024)
- Offenbach
  - Fantasio (2019, first British production)
  - Vert-Vert (2014)
- Rimsky-Korsakov
  - Mayskaya Noch (2006)
- Jean-Philippe Rameau
  - Platée (2024)
- Rossini
  - Il barbiere di Siviglia (1994, 2023)
  - Il turco in Italia (1996, 2011, 2017)
  - La pietra del paragone (1998)
  - La gazzetta (2001, British premiere)
  - La gazza ladra (2002)
  - L'equivoco stravagante (2004, British premiere)
  - Le comte Ory (2005, 2021)
  - La donna del lago (2007)
  - Armida (2010)
  - Maometto secondo (2013, British premiere)
- David Sawer
  - The Skating Rink (2018, World Premiere New Commission)
- Schumann
  - Genoveva (2000, first British professional production)
- Smetana
  - Prodaná nevěsta (2019, 2023)
- Richard Strauss
  - Ariadne auf Naxos (1993, 2007, 2023)
  - Capriccio (1994, 2018)
  - Daphne (1995)
  - Die ägyptische Helena (1997, British premiere)
  - Die Liebe der Danae (1999, first British production)
  - Intermezzo (2001, 2015)
  - Die schweigsame Frau (2003)
  - Der Rosenkavalier (2021, 2026)
- Stravinsky
  - The Rake's Progress (2008)
- Tchaikovsky
  - Cherevichki (2004, first professional British production)
  - Eugene Onegin (2021)
  - The Queen of Spades (2025)
- Verdi
  - Falstaff (1998)
  - Un giorno di regno (2024)
- Vivaldi
  - L'incoronazione di Dario (2008, UK Premiere)
  - La verità in cimento (2011, UK Premiere)
  - L'Olimpiade (2012)

== See also ==
- List of opera festivals
- Country house opera
