= Stéphanie Nicolle =

Jersey lawyer

- Born: 11 March 1948 (age 78)
- Education: St Aidan's College, Durham
- Occupation: Lawyer
- Known for: HM Solicitor General for Jersey

Stéphanie Claire Nicolle, KC (born 11 March 1948) is a lawyer who practised in Jersey. She was HM Solicitor General for the island between 1994 and 2008.

== Early life and education ==
Born on 11 March 1948, Nicolle is the daughter of Walter Arthur Nicolle and Madeleine Claire, née Vitel. After schooling at the Convent of the Faithful Companions of Jesus in Jersey, she attended St Aidan's College in the University of Durham.

== Career ==
Nicolle was called to the bar at Gray's Inn in 1976, and then the Jersey Bar in 1978. She was a Crown Advocate there from 1986 to 1994, when was appointed HM Solicitor General for the Bailiwick. The following year, she became a Queen's Counsel (QC) in Jersey. She ceased to be Solicitor General in 2008, but became Adjunct Professor of Immovable Property at Jersey's Institute of Law, before retiring in 2012.

She published two books, The Jersey Law of Property (co-authored with P. Matthews and published in 1991) and The Origin and Development of Jersey Law (published in 1998).
