= Enid Russell-Smith =

British civil servant (1903–1989)

Portrait by Walter Bird, 1959

Dame Enid Mary Russell Russell-Smith, DBE (3 March 1903 – 12 July 1989) was a British civil servant.

== Career ==
Born in Esher, Surrey to Arthur Russell-Smith and Constance Mary (née Dilke), she attended Saint Felix School, Southwold, and Newnham College, Cambridge, graduating in 1925.

She was one of the first women to enter the British civil service via competitive examination. She joined the MoH (Ministry of Health) as an Assistant Principal, where she was later promoted to:

Private Secretary to the Permanent Secretary (1930-34)
Principal (1934-39) and Assistant Secretary (from 1939)

During World War II she helped evacuate children from Britain's major cities to the countryside to escape the Blitz.

== After World War II ==
Russell-Smith later participated in the establishment of the UK's NHS, holding the titles of Principal Assistant Secretary, Under-Secretary and Deputy Secretary.

She retired from the Civil Service in 1963, entering academia, being appointed as Principal of St Aidan's College at Durham University from 1963 to 1970. She was a part-time lecturer at Durham until 1986. She died at home on 12 July 1989, unmarried, aged 86.

== Awards/honours ==
She was an honorary fellow of Newnham College, Cambridge and was named Dame Commander of the Order of the British Empire in 1953.

Russell-Smith was also among the first British women to be awarded a black belt in judo. She began judo at age 34, and achieved her shodan (first black belt) grading in 1945. She ultimately achieved a 3-dan ranking through the London Budokwai. Throughout the 1940s and 1950s, she also edited Britain's first regular judo publication, the Budokwai Quarterly Bulletin.

== Publications ==
- "Modern Bureaucracy: the Home Civil Service" (1974). Gazette Issue 39863 published on 26 May 1953, p. 15
