= Philip Morrell =

British politician (1870–1943)

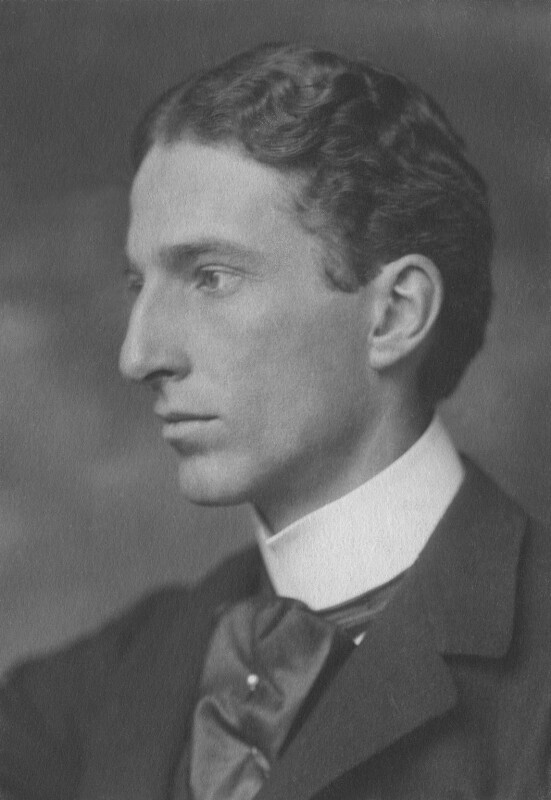
- Portrait of Morrell by George Charles Beresford, 1903

Member of Parliament for Burnley
- In office 6 December 1910 – 25 November 1918
- Preceded by: Gerald Arbuthnot
- Succeeded by: Dan Irving

Member of Parliament for Henley
- In office 22 January 1906 – 10 January 1910
- Preceded by: Sir Robert Hermon-Hodge
- Succeeded by: Valentine Fleming

Personal details
- Born: Philip Edward Morrell; 4 June 1870 Oxford, Oxfordshire, England
- Died: 5 January 1943 (aged 72) London, England
- Party: Liberal
- Spouse: Ottoline Cavendish-Bentinck (m. 1902; died 1938)
- Education: Eton College
- Alma mater: Balliol College, Oxford

Philip Edward Morrell (4 June 1870 – 5 January 1943) was a British Liberal politician. He served as a Member of Parliament for Burnley and Henley.

== Background ==
Morrell was the son of Frederic Morrell, a solicitor of Black Hall, Oxford, by his wife Harriette Anne, daughter of the Rev. Philip Wynter, president of St John's College, Oxford, and vice-chancellor of the University of Oxford. The Morrell family had made its fortune as brewers of beer, and Philip Morrell's grandfather was a trustee of the family brewery. He was educated at Eton and Balliol College, Oxford.

== Political career ==
Morrell was adopted as the Liberal candidate for Henley in September 1902, on the advice of H. H. Asquith, and was elected as such in the following election in 1906. He served in that constituency until 1910 and in Burnley from 1910 to 1918. He was the only non-Conservative MP for Henley.

== Personal life ==
Morrell married in London on 8 February 1902 Lady Ottoline Cavendish-Bentinck, half-sister of the 6th Duke of Portland. Lady Ottoline became an influential society hostess. They shared what would now be known as an open marriage for the rest of their lives.

His extramarital affairs produced several children who were cared for by his wife, who also struggled to conceal evidence of his mental instability. With Alice Louisa Jones, who worked at The Nation, Morrell had a son, Philip Hugh-Jones. The Morrells themselves had two children (twins): a son, Hugh, who died in infancy; and a daughter, Julian Morrell (1906–1983), whose first marriage was to Victor Goodman and second marriage was to Igor Vinogradoff.

== See also ==
- List of Bloomsbury Group people

Parliament of the United Kingdom
Preceded by Robert Hermon-Hodge	Member of Parliament for Henley; 1906 – January 1910	Succeeded by Valentine Fleming
Preceded by Gerald Arbuthnot	Member of Parliament for Burnley; December 1910 – 1918	Succeeded by Dan Irving
