= Lady Ottoline Morrell =

English aristocrat (1873–1938)

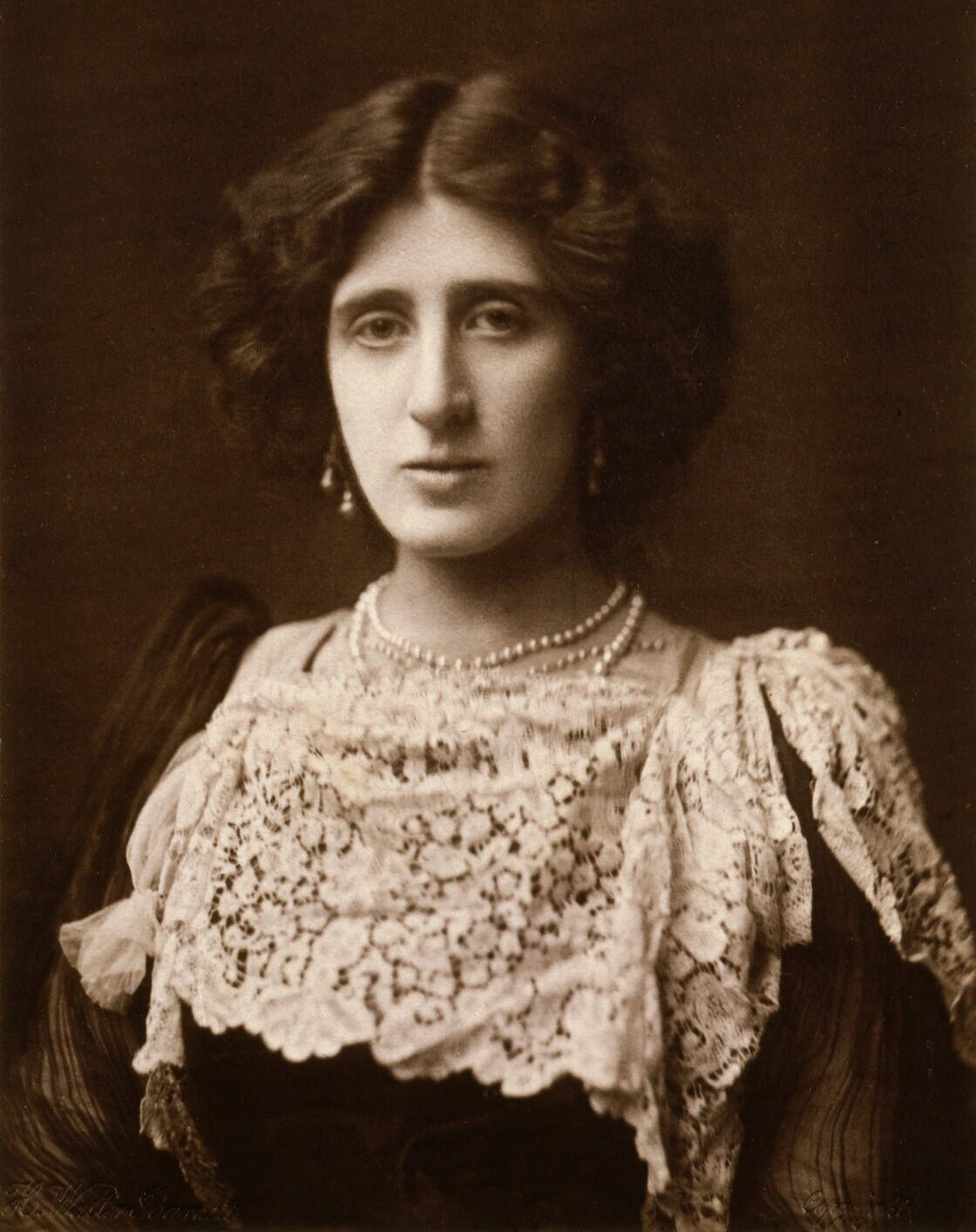
- Morrell in 1902
- Born: Ottoline Violet Anne Cavendish-Bentinck; 16 June 1873; Marylebone, London, England
- Died: 21 April 1938 (aged 64); Tunbridge Wells, Kent
- Occupation: Art patron
- Spouse: Philip Morrell 1902-1938
- Children: 2

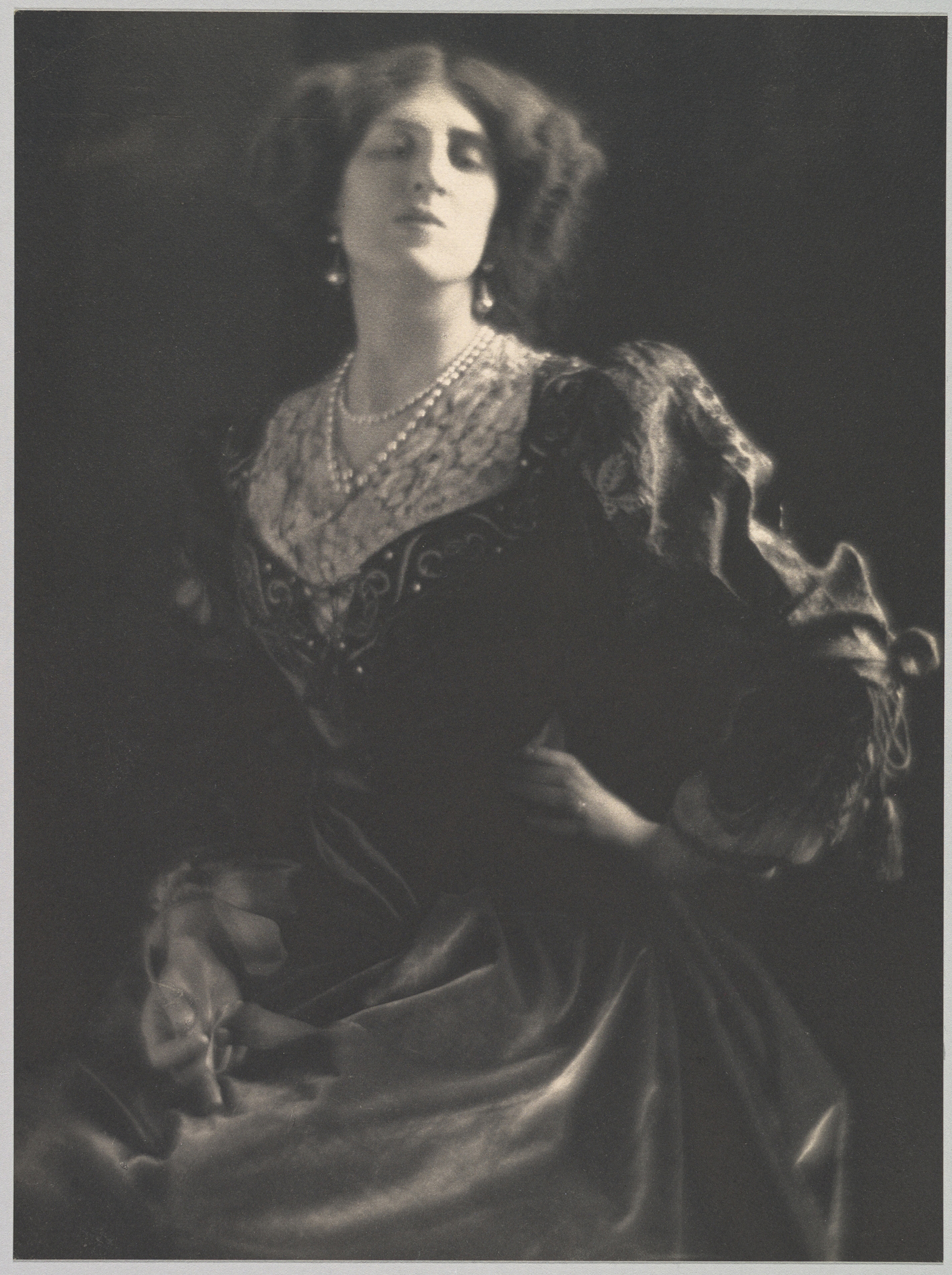
Portrait of Lady Ottoline Morrell by Adolf de Meyer, c. 1912

Lady Ottoline Violet Anne Morrell (née Cavendish-Bentinck; 16 June 1873 – 21 April 1938) was an English aristocrat and society hostess. Her circle of friends included many authors, artists, sculptors and poets. She was a member of the Bloomsbury Group and an important contributor to the Contemporary Art Society, and her patronage was enduring and influential.

== Early life ==
Born Ottoline Violet Anne Cavendish-Bentinck, she was the only daughter of Lieutenant-General Arthur Cavendish-Bentinck (son of Lord and Lady Charles Bentinck) and his second wife, Augusta Browne, Baroness Bolsover. She had three half-brothers from her father's first marriage. Lady Ottoline's great-great-uncle (through her paternal grandmother, Lady Charles Bentinck) was the 1st Duke of Wellington. Through her father, Arthur, she was a first cousin once removed of Queen Elizabeth the Queen Mother, and thus a first cousin twice removed of Queen Elizabeth II, both of whom descended from Arthur's brother Charles Cavendish-Bentinck. Her father had expectations of succeeding his cousin, the fifth Duke of Portland, which were disappointed in 1877, when he died before the duke. This left his family in straitened financial circumstances until 1878, when John Bentinck, 5th Duke of Portland, settled an allowance on Ottoline's half-brother William, who was the heir to his peerages and entailed estates. Little more than a year later, in December 1879, William became the sixth Duke of Portland, and his family moved into the family seat at Welbeck Abbey in Nottinghamshire. As the sister of a duke, Ottoline was granted the rank of a daughter of a duke, bringing with it the courtesy title of "Lady Ottoline".

Ottoline was brought up largely by a nurse and other servants. She had no playmates and was educated by a governess, who taught her to read, write, and memorize Bible verses. When she was sixteen, her brother the Duke married, and Ottoline's mother moved them into a small house in the Surrey village of Chertsey. Ottoline, by now very introverted, lived in isolation with her mother and developed a fanatical interest in religion, wearing drab clothing, fasting, and following the precepts of the Thomas à Kempis book The Imitation of Christ.

When Ottoline was 19, the Duke impressed on her mother that she should "come out". She fulfilled the duties of the 1892 London season, then returned immediately to the country. Her mother's health was failing; in 1893, they travelled to Italy in hope of improvement, but Lady Bolsover died upon their return to England. Ottoline returned to Welbeck, where she gave Bible classes to the servants and farmhands. Her brother sent her on several trips to Europe, where she sought treatments for her migraine headaches and other health problems. In 1899, the Duke sent her to study political economy and Roman history at Somerville College, Oxford, but she could not have earned a degree, as women could not then graduate. At Oxford, she met Philip Morrell, who would become a lawyer and a Member of Parliament. They shared a passion for art, a strong interest in Liberal politics, and a determination to rebel against the restraints of their conservative families. They were friends for two years before marrying in 1902 and had an open marriage for the rest of their lives.

After her marriage, Morrell, who was six feet tall with bright red hair, began to dress in fantastic costumes and occasionally dye her hair purple. She also began to take lovers. These included the physician and writer Axel Munthe, the painters Augustus John, Henry Lamb and Dora Carrington, the art historian Roger Fry, and the writer Virginia Woolf. Morrell's longest affair was with the philosopher Bertrand Russell, with whom she exchanged more than 3,500 letters.

Philip's extramarital affairs produced several children, who were cared for by Ottoline. She also struggled to conceal evidence of his mental instability. The Morrells themselves had two children (twins): a son, Hugh, who died in infancy, and a daughter, Julian.

== Hospitality ==
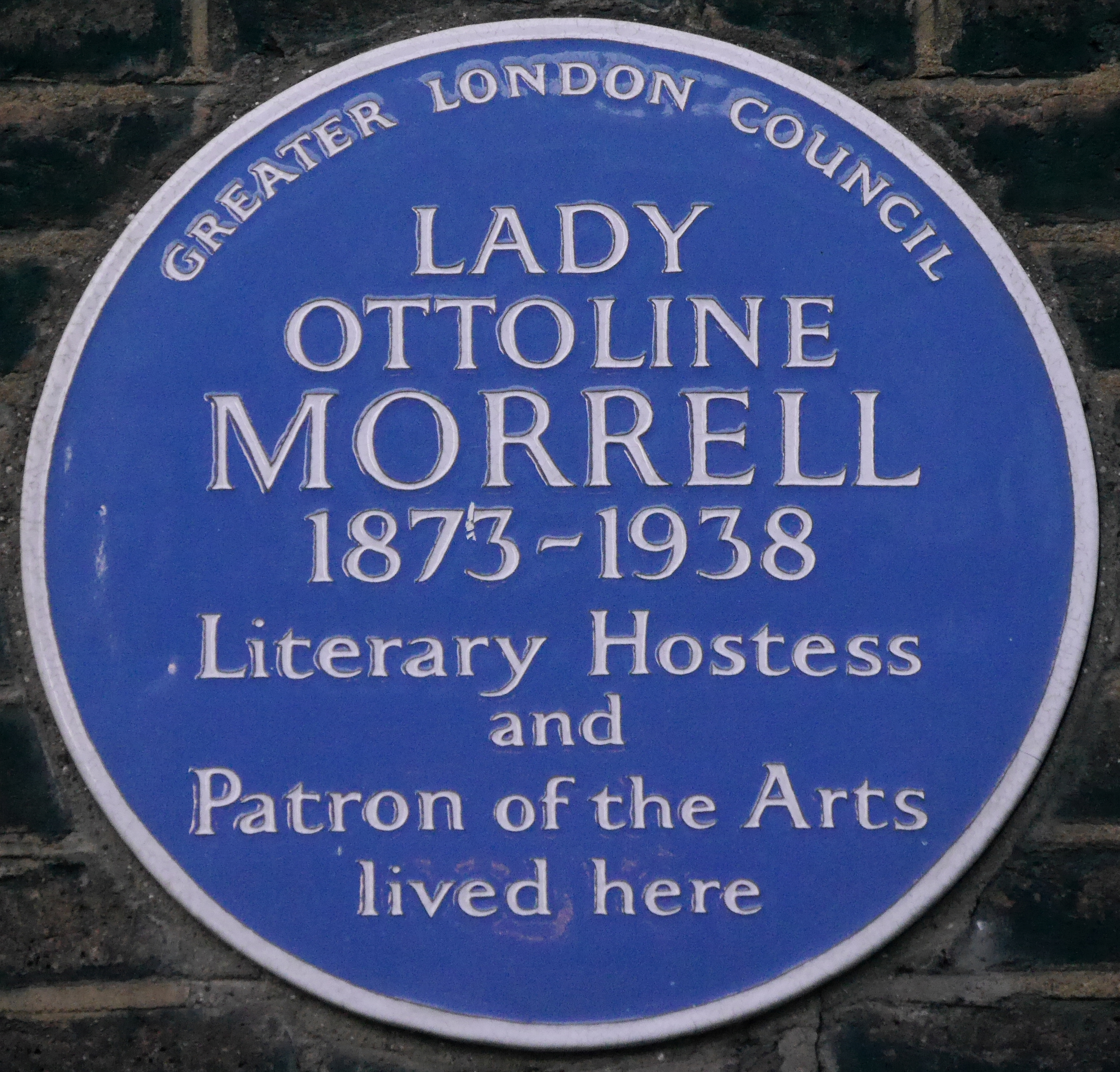
Blue plaque, 10 Gower Street, London

In 1906, Philip gained a seat in the House of Commons as a Liberal and the Morrells moved to a townhouse in Bloomsbury, at 44 Bedford Square. While entertaining political friends such as Winston Churchill and Herbert Asquith, Ottoline became a member of the Bloomsbury Group and took a keen interest in the careers of young artists, particularly Carrington, Stanley Spencer, Mark Gertler and Gilbert Spencer. The Morrells owned a country house at Peppard, near Henley on Thames. In 1915, while World War I raged, they sold the Peppard house and bought and restored the nearby old farmhouse Garsington Manor, where Ottoline established her talent for garden design and delighted in opening the house as a haven for like-minded people.

During the war, Garsington was more significant. The Morrells and their friends were ardent pacifists; of Garsington she said, "it seemed good to gather round us young and enthusiastic pacifists." Siegfried Sassoon, recuperating at Garsington after an injury, was encouraged to go AWOL as a protest against the war. They invited conscientious objectors such as Duncan Grant, Clive Bell and Lytton Strachey to take refuge at Garsington. Philip, who had lost his seat because of his anti-war stance, represented them at their tribunals. Despite this, Strachey became extremely critical of the couple, and spread malicious rumours about life at Garsington, to the point that the Morrells became the object of scandal and derision.

Aldous Huxley met his wife at Garsington, and so did his brother Julian Huxley, who married the Morrells' governess. One of Garsington's most faithful visitors was D. H. Lawrence, who, in his 1920 novel Women in Love, mocked Morrell by modelling the character Lady Hermione after her. Morrell had a brief affair with her gardener, Lionel Gomme; Lawrence would use this in his 1928 novel Lady Chatterley's Lover.

The hospitality offered by the Morrells was such that their guests had no suspicion that they were in financial difficulties. Many of them assumed that Ottoline was a wealthy woman. This was far from the case, and in 1928 the Morrells had to sell Garsington and move to more modest quarters in Gower Street, London. Here, Lady Ottoline remained a regular host to the adherents of the Bloomsbury Group, in particular Virginia and Leonard Woolf and Vanessa Bell, and many other artists and authors, including Henry James, W. B. Yeats, L. P. Hartley and T. S. Eliot.

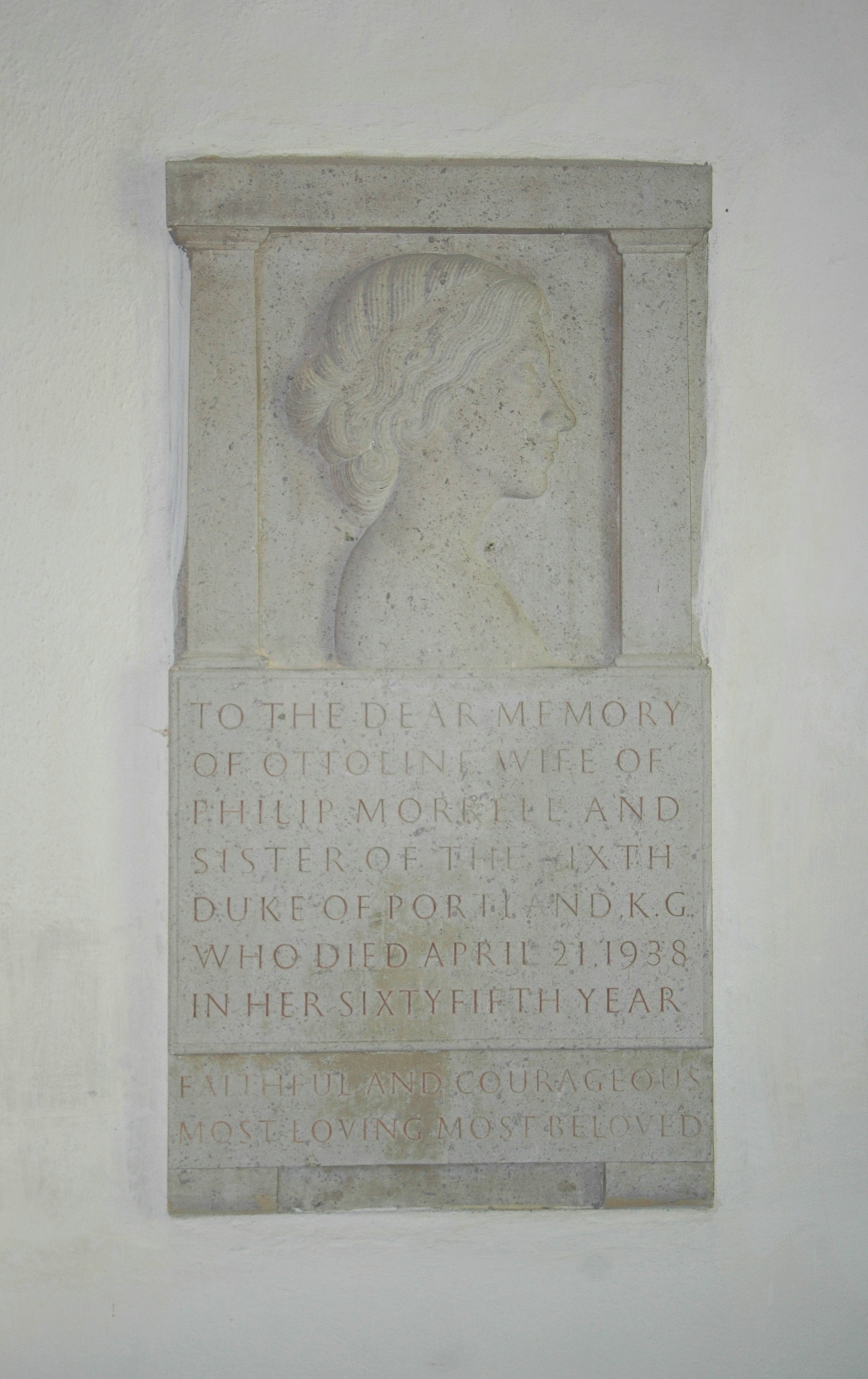
Monument to Lady Ottoline Morrell by Eric Gill in St Mary's Church, Garsington

Ottoline maintained her religious faith, but her contemporaries were fixated on the unofficial religion of 'Life Worship', whereby the cultivated elite focused on the development of close personal relations, cultural pursuits, vivid life experiences and the expansion of consciousness. The Garsington/Bloomsbury set believed that there was a spiritual hierarchy, with the artistic elite at one end and the "moronic masses" at the other. Among Lady Ottoline's friends, this belief was held particularly strongly by Lawrence, Virginia Woolf and Clive Bell. In spite of her strong religious beliefs, in 1907 Ottoline became a co-founder, with Sybil Neville-Rolfe, Henry Havelock Ellis and Leonard Darwin, of the Eugenics Education Society.

In 1909, a committee met at Bedford Street to discuss the organization of a new 'Modern Art Association'. In addition to the Morrells, there were Dugald Sutherland MacColl, Keeper of the Tate Gallery, Charles Holmes, Director of the National Portrait Gallery, Roger Fry, Curator at the Metropolitan Museum of Art, pottery expert Ernest Marsh, and Charles Aitken, Director of the Whitechapel Gallery. They were joined by Arthur Clutton-Brock (1868–1924), art critic for The Times, the poet John Bowyer Nichols, and Robbie Ross, Director of the Carfax Gallery. The committee settled on the name "Contemporary Art Society"; its first purchase was Augustus John's "Smiling Woman" (Woman Smiling), which has been in the Tate since 1917. Lady Ottoline would support the society for the rest of her life; she wrote, "I feel strongly that every penny one can save ought to be given to young artists. At least, we who really feel the beauty and wonder of art ought to help them. There are heaps of people who understand philanthropy…. and young creators have such a terrible struggle."

== Later life and death ==
Soon after moving to Gower Street, Lady Ottoline developed cancer of the jaw and had to have her lower teeth and part of her jawbone removed. In 1937, she suffered a stroke and was admitted to Sherwood Park Clinic, in Tunbridge Wells. The clinic was run by Dr Alexander Cameron (1887–1938), who, in 1924, had been sentenced to nine months' imprisonment for the unlawful killing of a patient at Northampton General Hospital. Cameron injected Lady Ottoline with Prontosil, an untested new drug. Ottoline's condition worsened and Cameron killed himself. Two days later, on 21 April 1938, Ottoline died of heart failure, at age 64. She was buried at St Winifred's Churchyard in Worksop, Nottinghamshire. When he died, in 1943, Philip Morrell was buried next to her. A blue plaque in her honour was erected at her Gower Street home by the Greater London Council in 1986. A memorial statue, carved by Eric Gill, sits inside the front door of St Mary's Church, Garsington.

Morrell's work as a decorator, colourist and garden designer remains undervalued. The novelist Henry Green wrote to Philip Morrell of "her love for all things true and beautiful which she had more than anyone ... no one can ever know the immeasurable good she did".

== Legacy ==
Morrell maintained detailed journals, which, in 2026, remain unpublished. She also wrote her memoirs, which were edited by Robert Gathorne-Hardy and published in three volumes: Ottoline: The Early Memoirs of Lady Ottoline Morrell (1963), Memoirs of Lady Ottoline Morrell: A Study in Friendship 1873–1915 (1963), and Ottoline at Garsington: Memoirs of Lady Ottoline Morrell, 1915–1918 (1974).

Her letters, some manuscripts by Morrell and other authors, and many photographs and sketches provided by the authors to Morrell are collected at the Harry Ransom Center at the University of Texas at Austin. Her fantastically eccentric wardrobe, which includes 600 items of textiles, dress and accessories, is housed at the Fashion Museum, Bath. A further collection of Ottoline's textiles was auctioned in 2025.

In literature, Ottoline was the inspiration for the two Lawrence characters, for Mrs Bidlake in Aldous Huxley's Point Counter Point, for Lady Caroline Bury in Graham Greene's It's a Battlefield, and for Lady Sybilline Quarrell in Alan Bennett's Forty Years On. The Coming Back (1933), another novel which portrays her, was written by Constance Malleson, one of Ottoline's many rivals for the affection of Bertrand Russell, as was Pugs and Peacocks (1921) by Gilbert Cannan. In Confidence, a 1917 short story by Katherine Mansfield, portrays the "wits of Garsington". Huxley's 1921 roman à clef Crome Yellow depicts life at a thinly veiled Garsington, with a caricature of Lady Ottoline Morrell for which she never forgave him.

Portraits of Lady Ottoline were painted by, among others, Henry Lamb, Duncan Grant and Augustus John. There are several artistic photographs of her by Cecil Beaton.

In modern media, she is portrayed by Tilda Swinton in Derek Jarman's film Wittgenstein, by Roberta Taylor in Brian Gilbert's film Tom & Viv, by Penelope Wilton in Christopher Hampton's film Carrington and by Suzanne Bertish in Terence Davies's film Benediction.

The first production of a biographical play, Ottoline, by Janet Bolam, took place in the gardens of Garsington Manor in July 2021.

== Photography ==
Morrell took hundreds of photographs of the people in her circle. Carolyn Heilbrun edited Lady Ottoline's Album (1976), a collection of snapshots and photographic portraits of Morrell and of her famous contemporaries, mostly taken by Morrell.

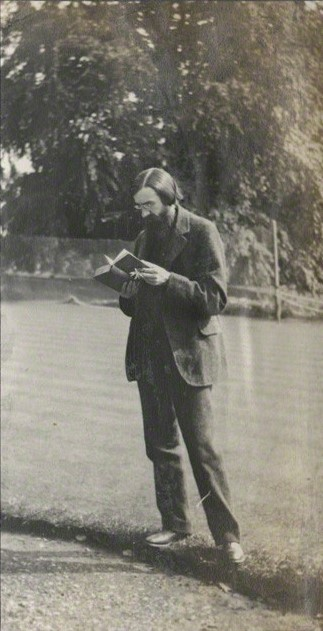
Lytton Strachey, 1911–12

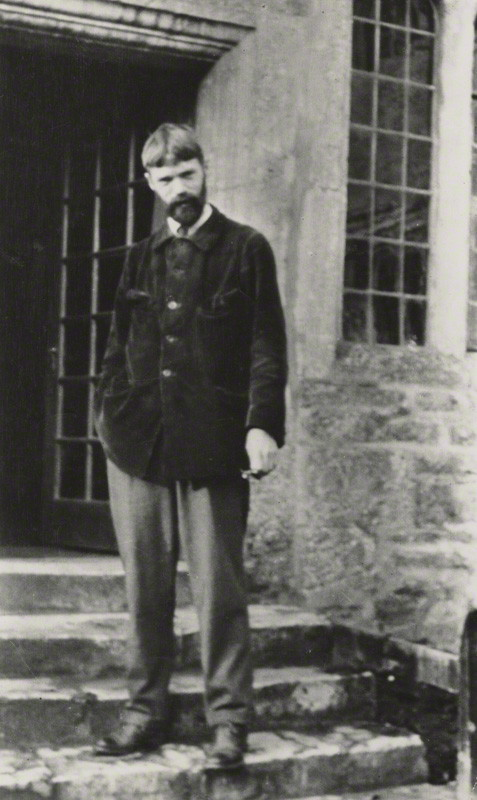
D. H. Lawrence, 1915

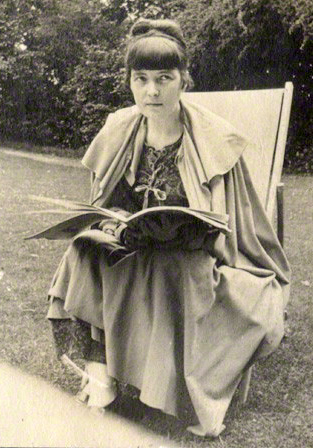
Katherine Mansfield, 1917

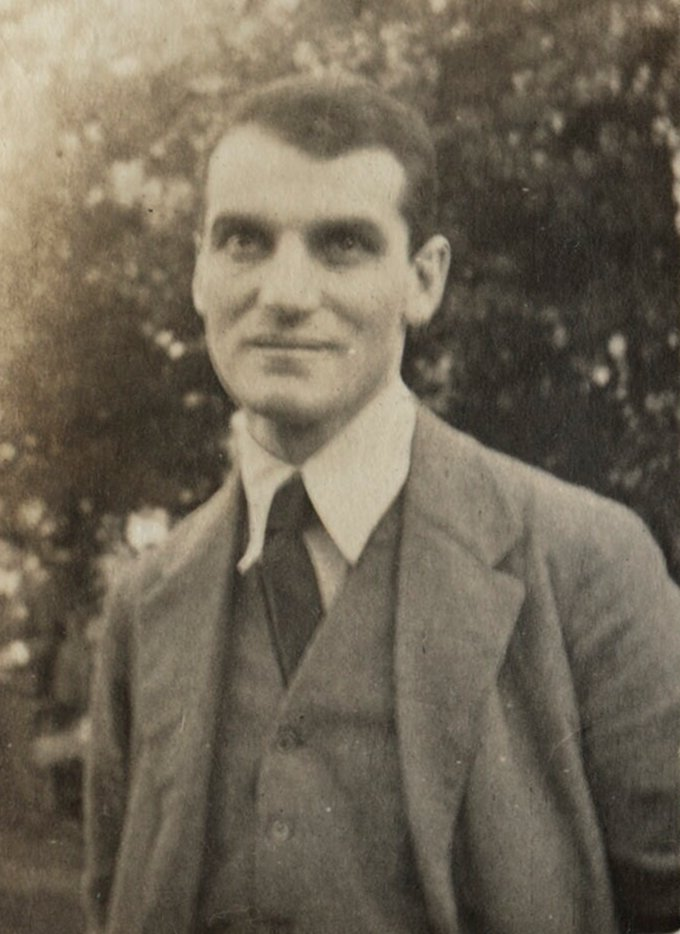
John Middleton Murry, 1917

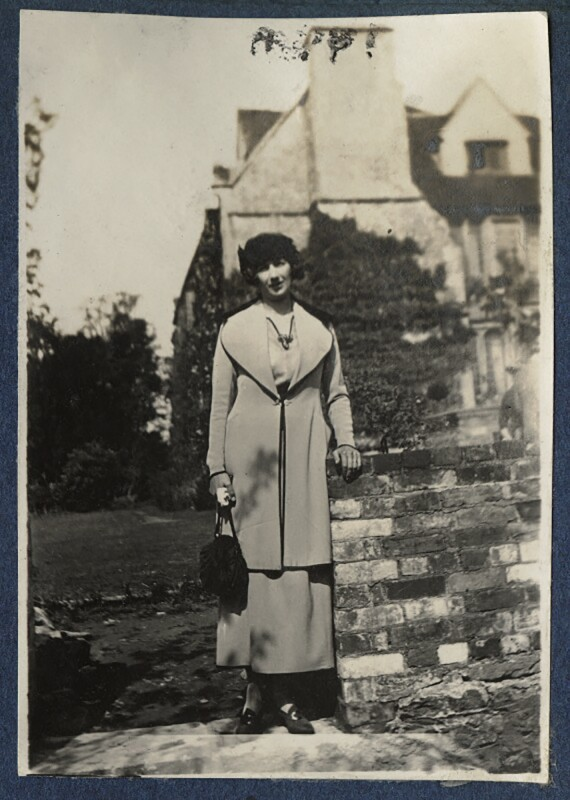
Katharine Asquith, 1920

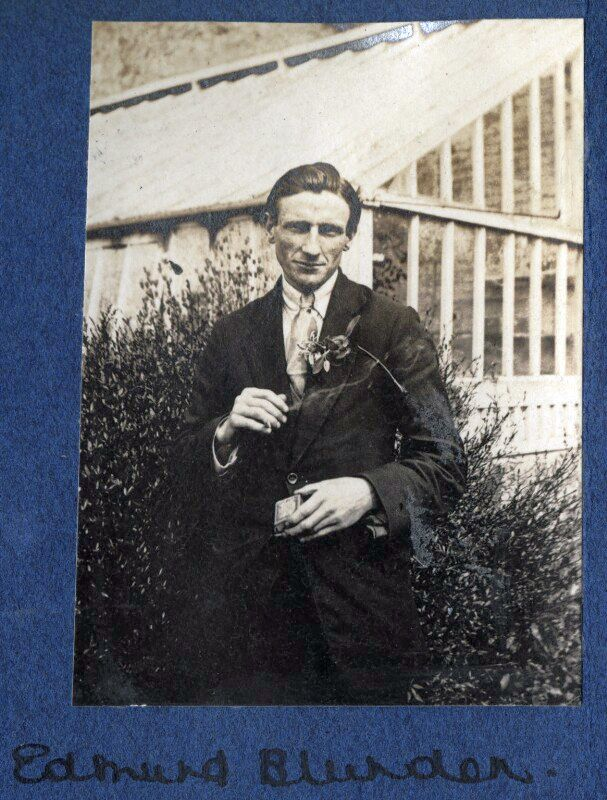
Edmund Blunden, 1920

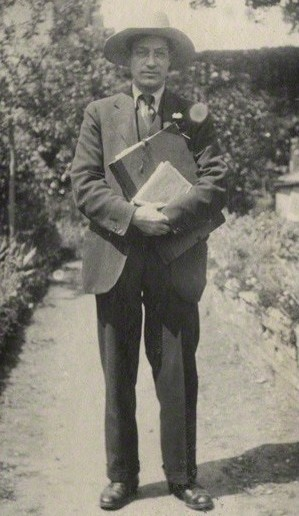
Duncan Grant, 1922

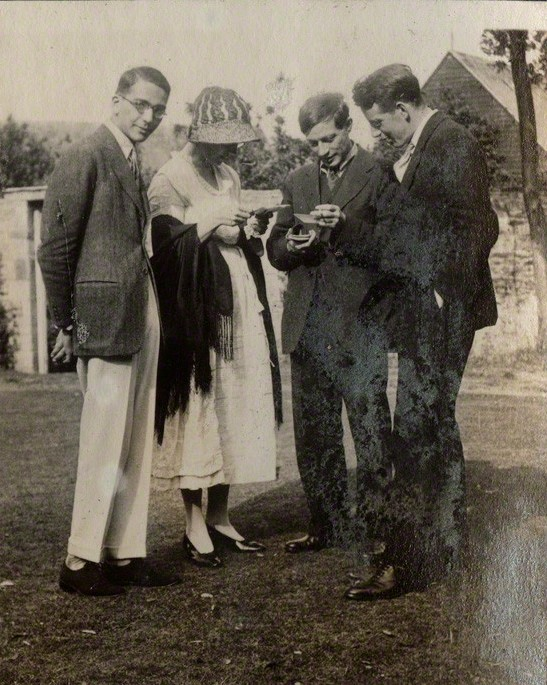
Jean de Menasce, Vanessa Bell, Duncan Grant, and Eric Siepmann, 1922

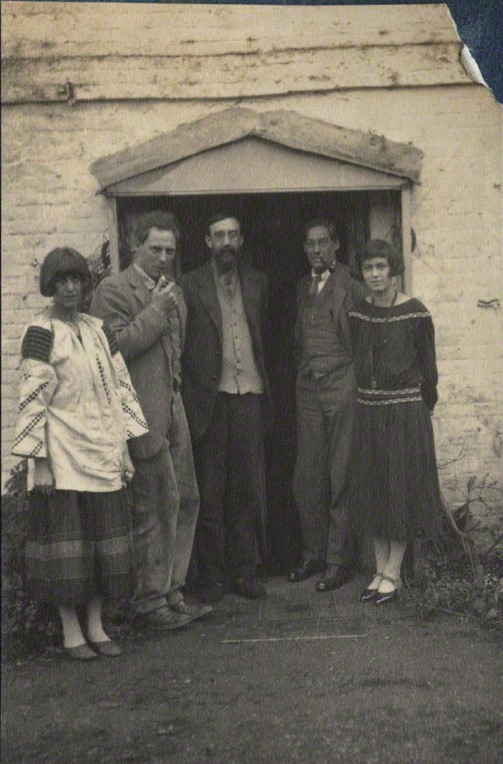
Dora Carrington, Ralph Partridge, Lytton Strachey, Oliver Strachey, and Frances Partridge, 1923

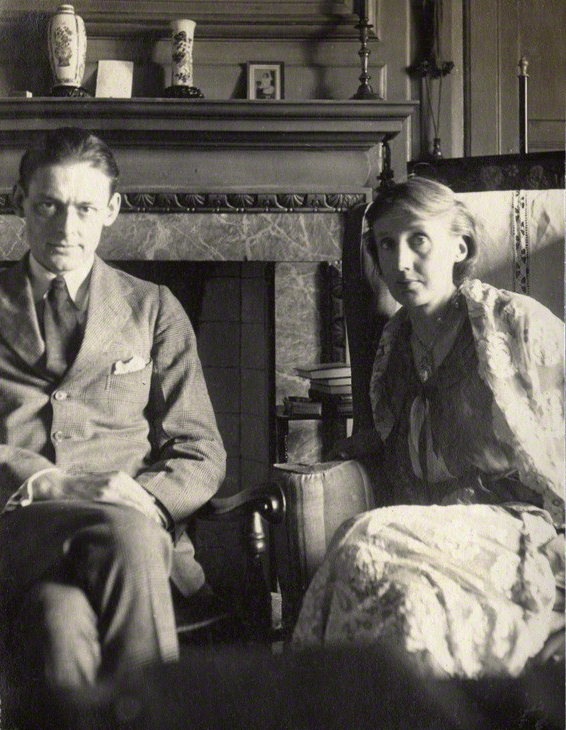
Virginia Woolf and T. S. Eliot, 1924

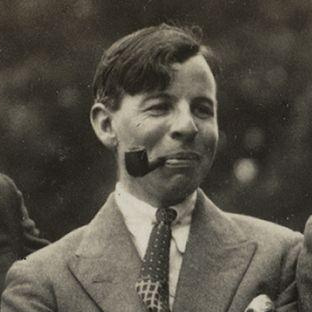
Gilbert Spencer, 1926

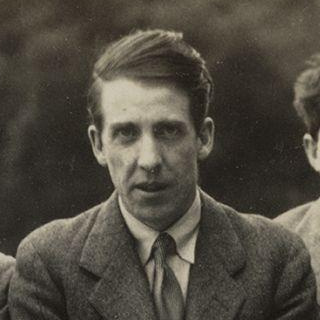
Walter J. Turner, 1926

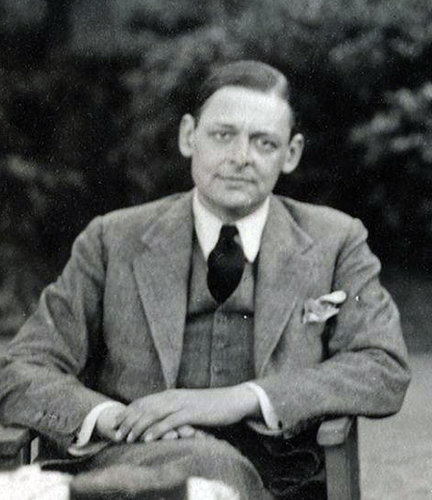
T.S. Eliot, 1934

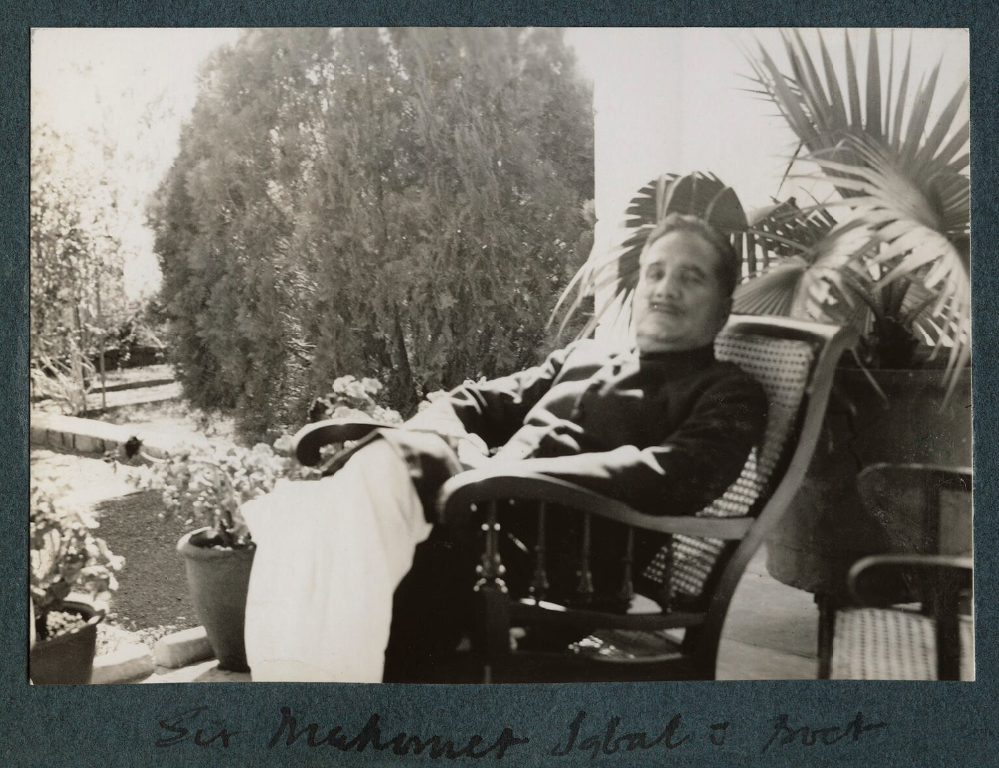
Sir Muhammad Iqbal, 1935

== See also ==
- Headington Hill Hall, Oxford
- Joseph Conrad (Lady Ottoline's impression)
