= Valentine Fleming =

British politician (1882–1917)

Valentine Fleming DSO, MP
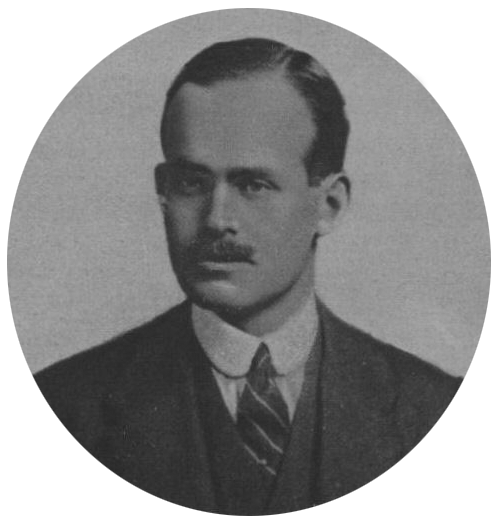
- Valentine Fleming from the Roll of Honour published in The Illustrated London News in June 1917

Member of Parliament for Henley
- In office 10 February 1910 – 20 May 1917
- Preceded by: Philip Morrell
- Succeeded by: Sir Robert Hermon-Hodge

Personal details
- Born: 17 February 1882 Newport-on-Tay, Fife, Scotland
- Died: 20 May 1917 (aged 35) Épehy, Somme, France
- Cause of death: Killed in action
- Resting place: Templeux-le-Guérard British Cemetery, Templeux-le-Guérard, Somme, France; 49°57′46″N 3°9′28″E
- Party: Conservative
- Spouse: Evelyn Beatrice Sainte Croix Rose (m. 1906)
- Children: Peter; Ian; Richard; Michael
- Parent: Robert Fleming (financier) (father)
- Education: Eton College
- Alma mater: Magdalen College, Oxford
- Profession: Banker

Military service
- Allegiance: United Kingdom
- Branch/service: British Army
- Years of service: 1908–1917
- Rank: Major
- Unit: Queen's Own Oxfordshire Hussars
- Battles/wars: First World War
- Awards: Distinguished Service Order; Mentioned in Despatches (2)

Major Valentine Fleming (17 February 1882 – 20 May 1917) was a Scottish Conservative Member of Parliament who was killed in the First World War. He was the father of the authors Peter Fleming and Ian Fleming, the latter of whom created the James Bond character.

== Early life and political career ==
Fleming was born in Newport-on-Tay, Fife, the son of Sarah (née Hindmarsh) and Robert Fleming, a wealthy Scottish banker and founder of the merchant bank Robert Fleming & Co. Fleming was educated at Eton College and Magdalen College, Oxford. He married Evelyn Beatrice Sainte Croix Rose in London on 15 February 1906. Together they had four sons: adventurer and travel writer Peter (father of actress Lucy Fleming), novelist Ian (author of the James Bond novels), Richard (whose son is billionaire Adam Fleming), and Michael.

From 1906 to 1911, the family lived at Braziers Park in Ipsden, Oxfordshire. On his election to parliament, they moved to Pitt House on Hampstead Heath in 1910. He was a Member of Parliament for Henley from 1910 to 1917. In 1916 they built a shooting lodge at Arnisdale, near Glenelg in Inverness-shire in the Scottish Highlands.

== Military service ==
At the outbreak of the First World War Valentine was a captain in 'C' Squadron, Queen's Own Oxfordshire Hussars, a yeomanry regiment, having received his commission on 30 June 1908. After a month of training the regiment was sent to France on 22 September 1914.

He wrote a "brisk and breezy account" to a fellow officer in England in 1914 about the start of the war. Initially the regiment had little more than "a tour of the principal French watering places" followed by a fortnight hanging about Dunkirk and Saint-Omer ("Very dull"), but then on 30 October were told by General de Lisle to:

occupy a line of trenches on the right of Messines. This was disagreeable as projectiles of every variety were exploding with a disquieting regularity all over the ground of our advance. .... Off we went, over some very holding ground, three squadrons in a succession of rushes in extended lines, the regularity of which was still disturbed by the wire! (Never move without nippers on the Sam Browne belt!). Luckily we had no man hit—I can’t think why—which put some heart into the men .... we began to wonder how to fix the bloody bayonets with which we had been issued two days previously. .... About 4.30 am they were relieved and marched back about two miles to get breakfast, v. hungry and sleepy. (But then De Lisle told them that the line had been broken, so) with empty bellies we become plodding up the usual wire-enclosed ploughed fields on the left of Messines, being pooped at by very high and wild rifle fire .... It was a very trying day for the men, they were d—-d hungry. [The line held, just; but Messines and its Ridge were taken, see Battle of Messines and First Battle of Ypres].

He also wrote to a close friend, Winston Churchill, in 1914 (the following is an excerpt):

Imagine a broad belt [of land], ten miles or so in width, stretching from the Channel to the German frontier near Basle, which is positively littered with the bodies of men…in which farms, villages, and cottages are shapeless heaps of blackened masonry; in which fields, roads and trees are pitted and torn and twisted by [artillery] shells...

Fleming was promoted to major on 2 November 1914 and became the commanding officer of 'C' Squadron. He was appointed the second-in-command of the regiment in January 1916.

Fleming was killed by German shellfire at Gillemont Farm, near Épehy, Somme, France on 20 May 1917. For his service, Valentine was posthumously awarded the Distinguished Service Order on 4 June 1917, having been previously twice mentioned in dispatches. His will was proven on 6 November, with his estate amounting to £265,596 19s. 5d. (roughly equivalent to £15,930,657 in 2025).

Major Fleming is buried at Templeux-le-Guérard British Cemetery, near the village of Templeux-le-Guérard. He is commemorated on Panel 8 of the Parliamentary War Memorial in Westminster Hall, one of 22 MPs who died during World War I to be named on that memorial. Additionally, he is one of 19 MPs who died in the war commemorated by heraldic shields in the Commons Chamber. A further act of commemoration came with the unveiling in 1932 of a manuscript-style illuminated book of remembrance for the House of Commons, which includes a short biographical account of his life and death.

Fleming is also remembered in a memorial window by G.E.R. Smith and adjacent wall plaque at St Bartholomew's Church in Nettlebed, Oxfordshire. The window, installed in 1945, also commemorates Fleming's eldest son, Captain Michael Valentine Fleming, who was killed in action in France in 1940. Its two lights show St Valentine and St Michael Archangel.

Fleming's obituary in The Times was written by Churchill.

Glenelg War Memorial

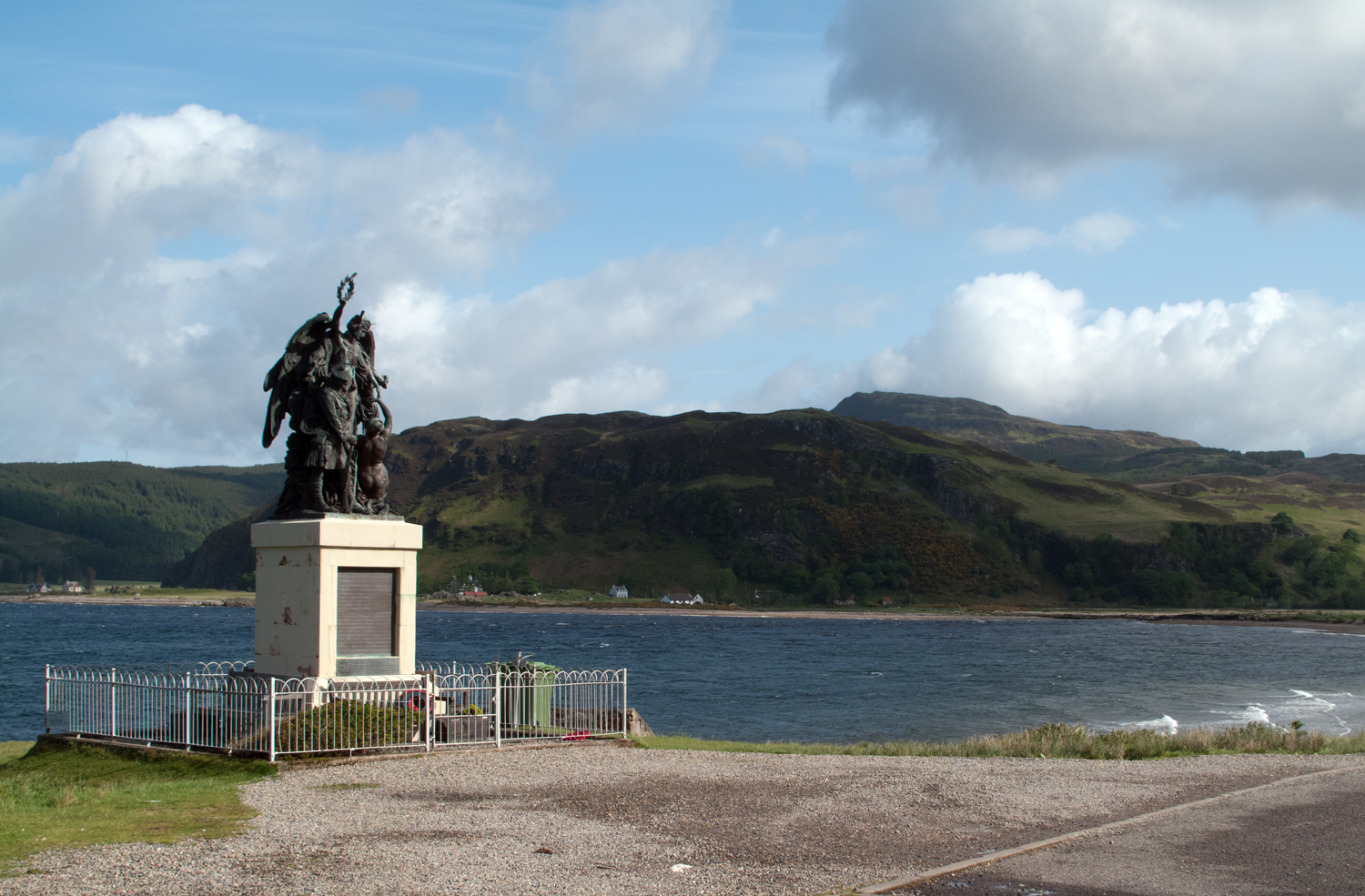
Glenelg Bay with the village war memorial

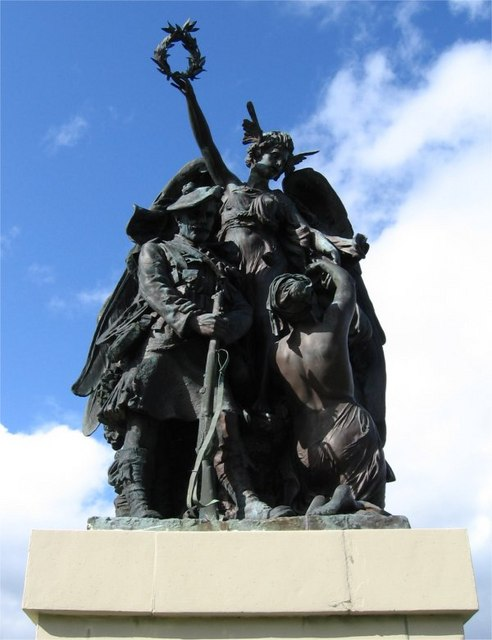
Sculpture on the Glenelg war memorial

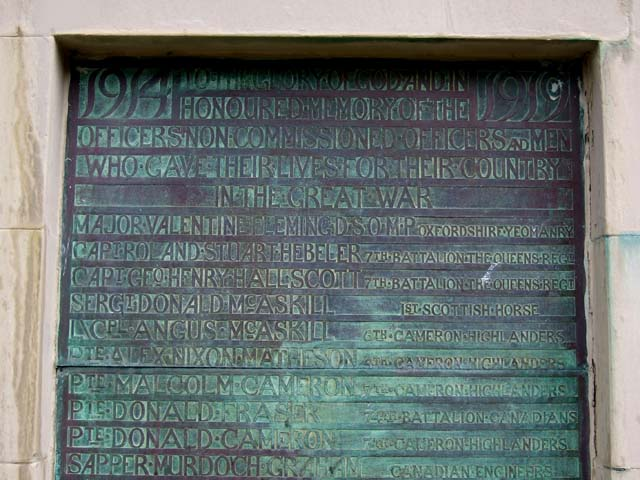
Valentine Fleming's name on the Glenelg war memorial
Henley Town Hall, Oxfordshire

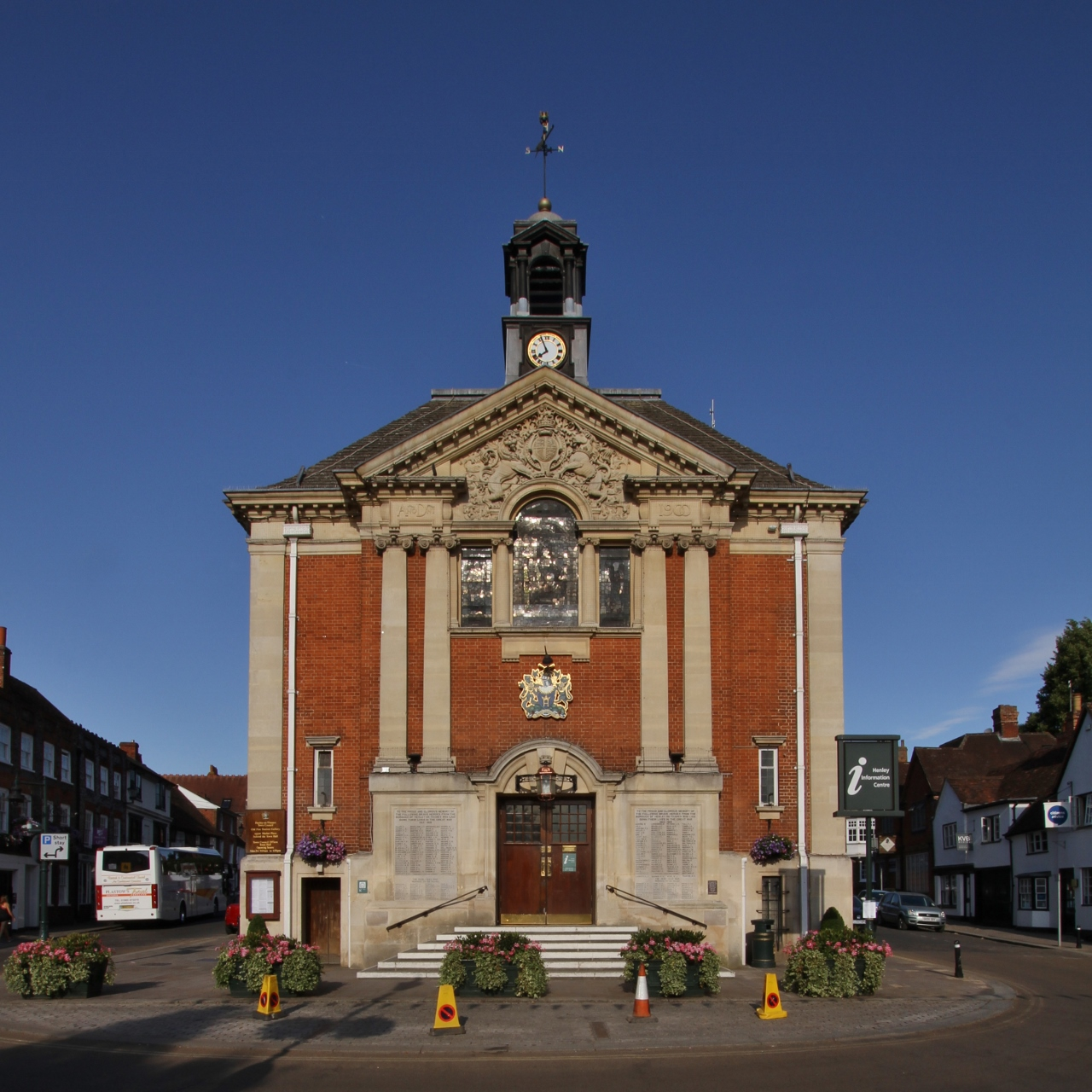
Henley-on-Thames War Memorial Tablets on the East face of Henley Town Hall

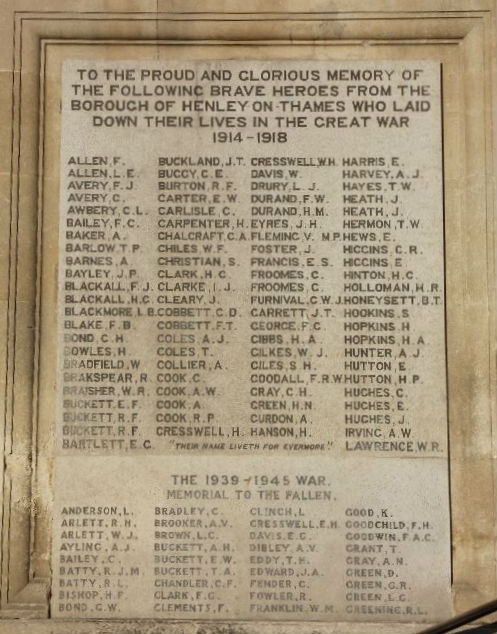
Valentine Fleming's name on the Henley-on-Thames war memorial
St Bartholomew's Church, Nettlebed

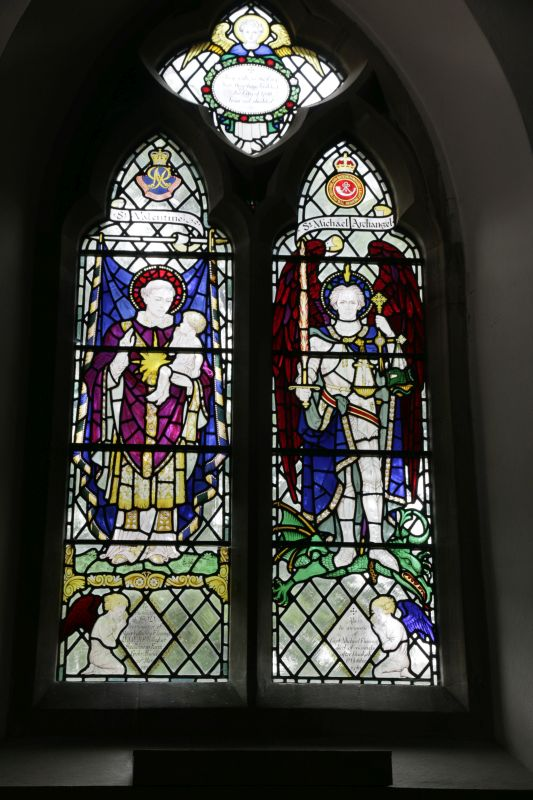
Memorial window commemorating both Fleming and his eldest son, Michael

Memorial plaque to Valentine Fleming

== Legacy ==
In 1914, shortly before leaving to fight in France, Valentine signed a will that left Pitt House and his effects to his wife Evelyn; most of his estate was left in trust to benefit their four sons and their future families. His wife Evelyn would have a generous income from the trust unless she remarried, in which case she would receive a reduced amount of £3000 per annum. Evelyn never remarried and felt it was a "bad will".

Parliament of the United Kingdom
Preceded by Philip Edward Morrell	Member for Henley; 1910–1917	Succeeded by Sir Robert Hermon-Hodge
