= Brazilian Adventure =

1933 book by Peter Fleming

- Author: Peter Fleming
- Language: English
- Subject: Travel
- Genre: Non-fiction
- Publisher: Alden Press
- Publication date: 1933
- Publication place: United Kingdom
- Media type: Print (Hardback)
- Followed by: One's Company

Brazilian Adventure is a book by Peter Fleming about his search for the lost Colonel Percy Fawcett in the Brazilian jungle. The book was initially published in 1933 by Alden Press.

== Overview ==
In 1925, British explorer Colonel Percy Fawcett, along with his son and another companion, disappeared while searching in Brazil for the Lost City of Z. Not long after, Peter Fleming, who was literary editor for London's The Times, answered a small ad seeking volunteers for an expedition to find out what had happened to them. Fleming's story of that 1932 expedition is told in Brazilian Adventure.

Despite a great deal of fanfare, the expedition seems to have been very poorly organized. Fleming and his companions do not seem to have done much preparation, not even bothering to learn any Portuguese. They left everything up to the leader they hired, an eccentric American, Major George Lewy Pingle (not his real name) who lived in Brazil. They sailed from England, met Pingle, and followed him to the Araguaia River and down it, with Fleming, an admirer of Hemingway, blasting away at the wildlife "for sport" as they went.

When the expedition reached the Tapirapé River, which Fawcett was known to have traveled, the group fell apart. Major Pingle, whose bizarre moments of unreason had been making things more and more difficult all along, claimed the search was impossible and he was giving it up. Some of the members of the expedition agreed with him. Fleming and two others, however, decided to continue on their own and left to go up the Tapirape with their bearers. Traveling through the tropical jungle was very difficult; eventually only Fleming and Pettiward could keep going. When they spotted natives in the distance who were said to be cannibals, they turned back. They were still uncertain about the fate of Fawcett, but they had turned up more clues than they started with.

Returning to the mouth of the Tapirape and heading back up the Araguaya, Fleming and his group found Major Pingle and the others. Fleming desperately wanted to be the first to get back to civilization with his version of why they had split, because Pingle was trying to get his own version, which was harshly critical of Fleming, to arrive first. So the two groups furiously raced each other down the long Tocantins and Amazon rivers to the port city of Para, where they could report back to England and catch a liner for home.

== Influence ==
Fleming's account was not widely disputed during its initial publication and is still considered a classic in travel literature; along with Fleming's later books, One's Company: A Journey to China in 1933 and News from Tartary: A Journey from Peking to Kashmir (1936).

== Expedition members ==
Robert "Bob" Churchward (organiser), "Major George Lewy Pingle" (a pseudonym), Peter Fleming, Roger Pettiward, Neville Priestley, Noel Skeffington-Smyth, Walter Blunt-Mackenzie, Arthur Humphries

== About author ==
Peter Fleming was the brother of Ian Fleming, author of the James Bond thriller series.

== Bibliography ==
- Fleming, P. (1933) Brazilian Adventure Oxford: Alden Press
- Reprinted Northwestern University Press 1999 ISBN 9780810160651.
- Reprinted Eland Publishing Ltd, London, 2023 ISBN 9781780602004

== Other ==
- The Lost City of Z: A Tale of Deadly Obsession in the Amazon, a 2009 book by American author David Grann.
