= St Bartholomew's Church, Nettlebed =

Church of St Bartholomew, Nettlebed
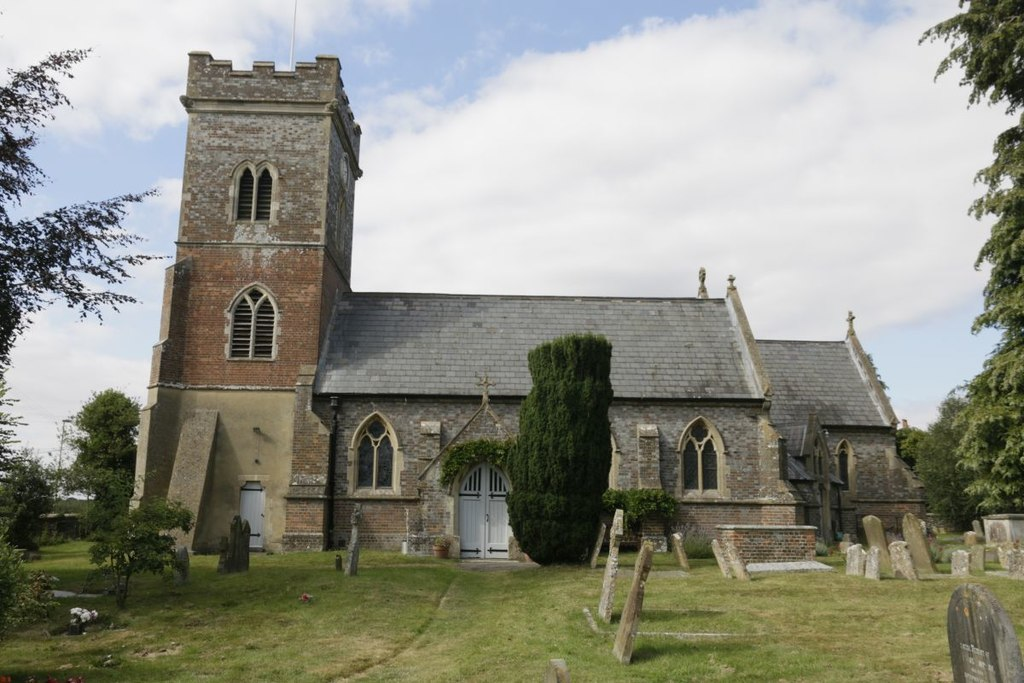
- Church of St Bartholomew, Nettlebed
- 51.575245°N 0.993655°W
- OS grid reference: SU 69832 86740
- Location: Nettlebed, Oxfordshire
- Country: England
- Denomination: Church of England

History
- Status: Parish church

Architecture
- Functional status: Active
- Heritage designation: Grade II Listed
- Designated: 18 July 1963
- Architect: John Henry Hakewill
- Style: Gothic Revival
- Years built: 1845 - 1846

Administration
- Diocese: Oxford
- Archdeaconry: Dorchester
- Deanery: Henley
- Parish: Nettlebed

St Bartholomew’s Church is a Church of England parish church in the village of Nettlebed, Oxfordshire. It is a Grade II listed building dedicated to Bartholomew the Apostle.

== History ==
A church in Nettlebed is recorded from at least the 12th century. However, the present building was largely reconstructed between 1845 and 1846 by architect John Henry Hakewill in an Early English Gothic Revival style, replacing a medieval predecessor on the same site.

== Architecture and fittings ==
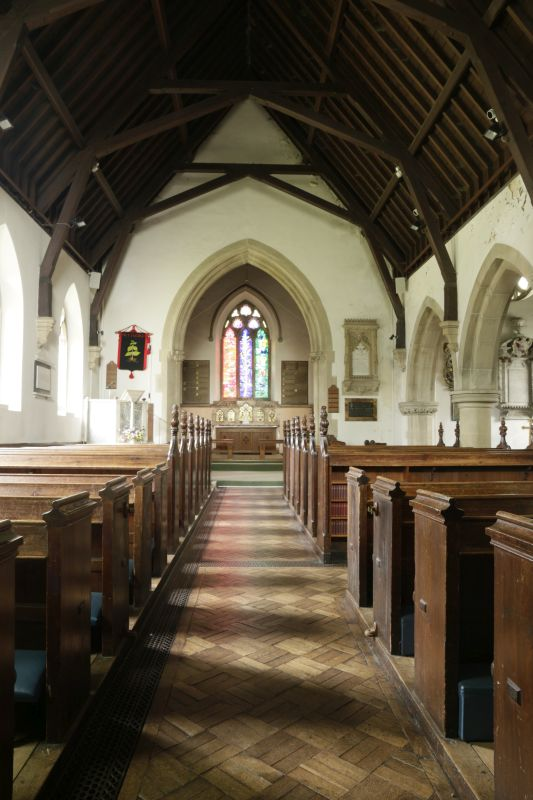
View of nave and chancel

A plain structure of grey and red brick, with stone dressings and slate roofs, St Bartholomew's Church comprises a four-bay nave, two-bay chancel, south aisle, gabled south porch and south vestry.

Hakewill preserved the earlier three-stage west tower, incorporating it into his rebuild. However, the tower itself was relatively modern and built only in the 18th century, though there may be some medieval fabric remaining within its base.

Inside, the only surviving medieval fitting is the 12th-century Norman stone font, located near the south door. Several 17th and 18th-century memorials were transferred to the present building, including a brass plate dated 1637 dedicated to Edmund Taverner and later stone wall monuments in the south aisle.

The green and cream marble pulpit, vaguely Art and Crafts-style, was installed in 1896 as a memorial to J. C. Havers of Joyce Grove.

In the north wall of the nave is a late Arts and Crafts-style two-light window designed by Gerald Edward Roberts Smith and installed in 1945. The left light, depicting St Valentine, is dedicated to Major Valentine Fleming DSO, a former Member of Parliament for Henley who was killed in action in France in 1917 aged 35. Major Fleming was the father of Ian Fleming, creator of James Bond. The right light, showing St Michael Archangel, is dedicated to Major Fleming's eldest son, Captain Michael Valentine Fleming, who was himself killed in action in France in 1940, aged 28. Both were buried in France and memorial plaques are installed on either side of the window.

The east window of the chancel was designed by John Piper and executed by Patrick Reyntiens in 1970. Commissioned in memory of Dr Robin Williamson, it comprises three main lights in red, blue, and green respectively. The central light shows the Tree of life flanked by fish on the left and butterflies on the right.

A second window by Piper and Reyntiens was installed in the south aisle in 1976. It again depicts the Tree of life, this time populated by birds including an owl, hawk, and pheasant. The window commemorates travel writer and journalist Colonel Peter Fleming, younger brother of Ian Fleming.

== Bells ==
The church has a ring of six bells, cast in 1846 at the Whitechapel Bell Foundry. Originally hung in an oak frame, they were re-hung in 2000 in a new steel frame after refurbishment.

== Gallery ==
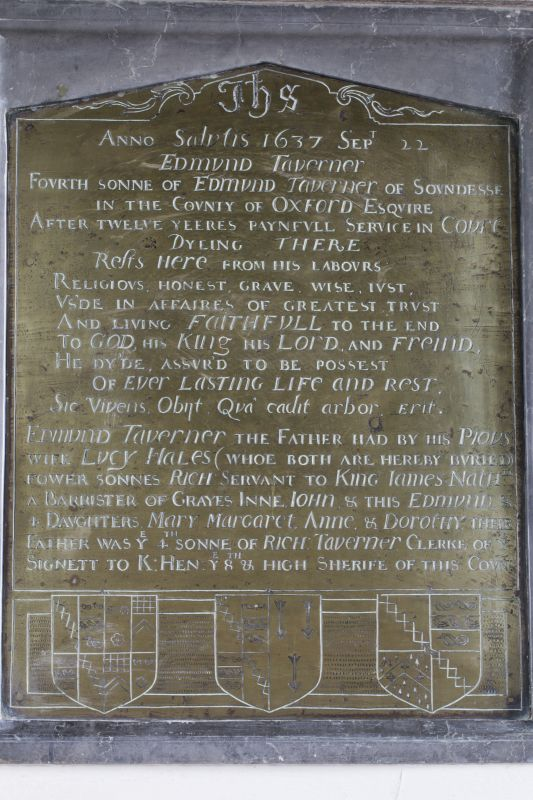
Brass memorial plaque to Edmund Taverner

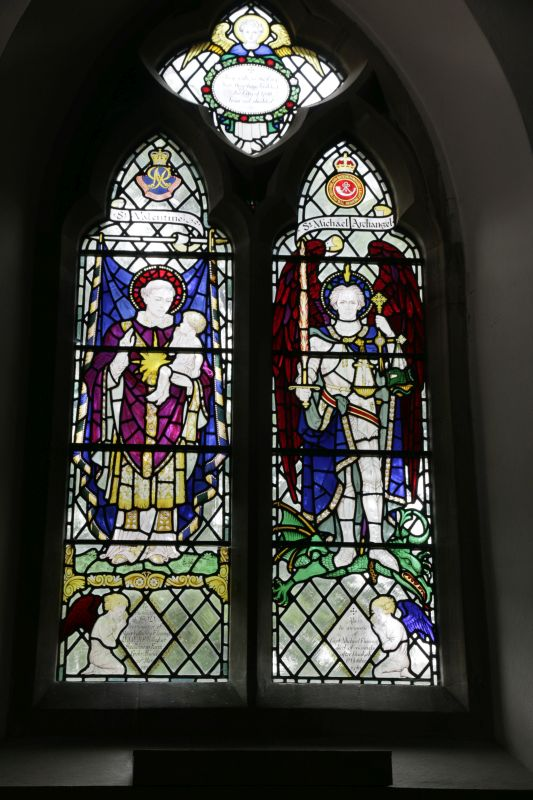
Valentine and Michael Fleming memorial window by G.E.R. Smith

Memorial plaque to Major Valentine Fleming

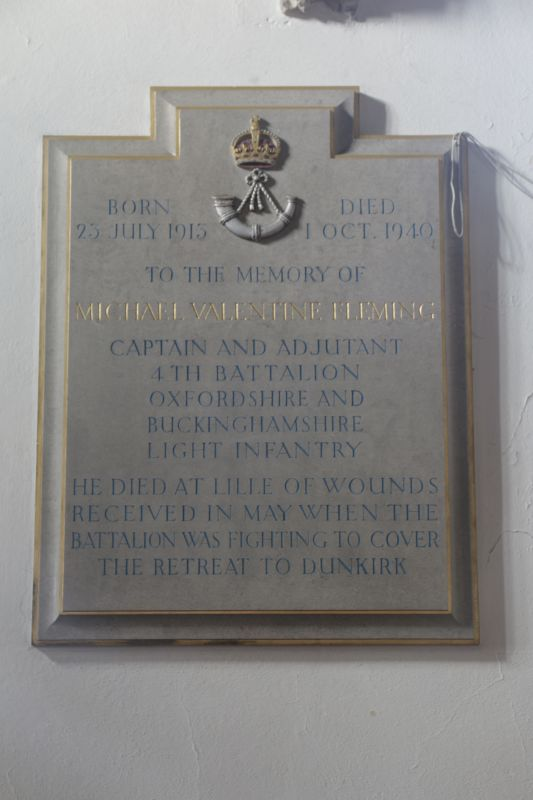
Memorial plaque to Captain Michael Fleming

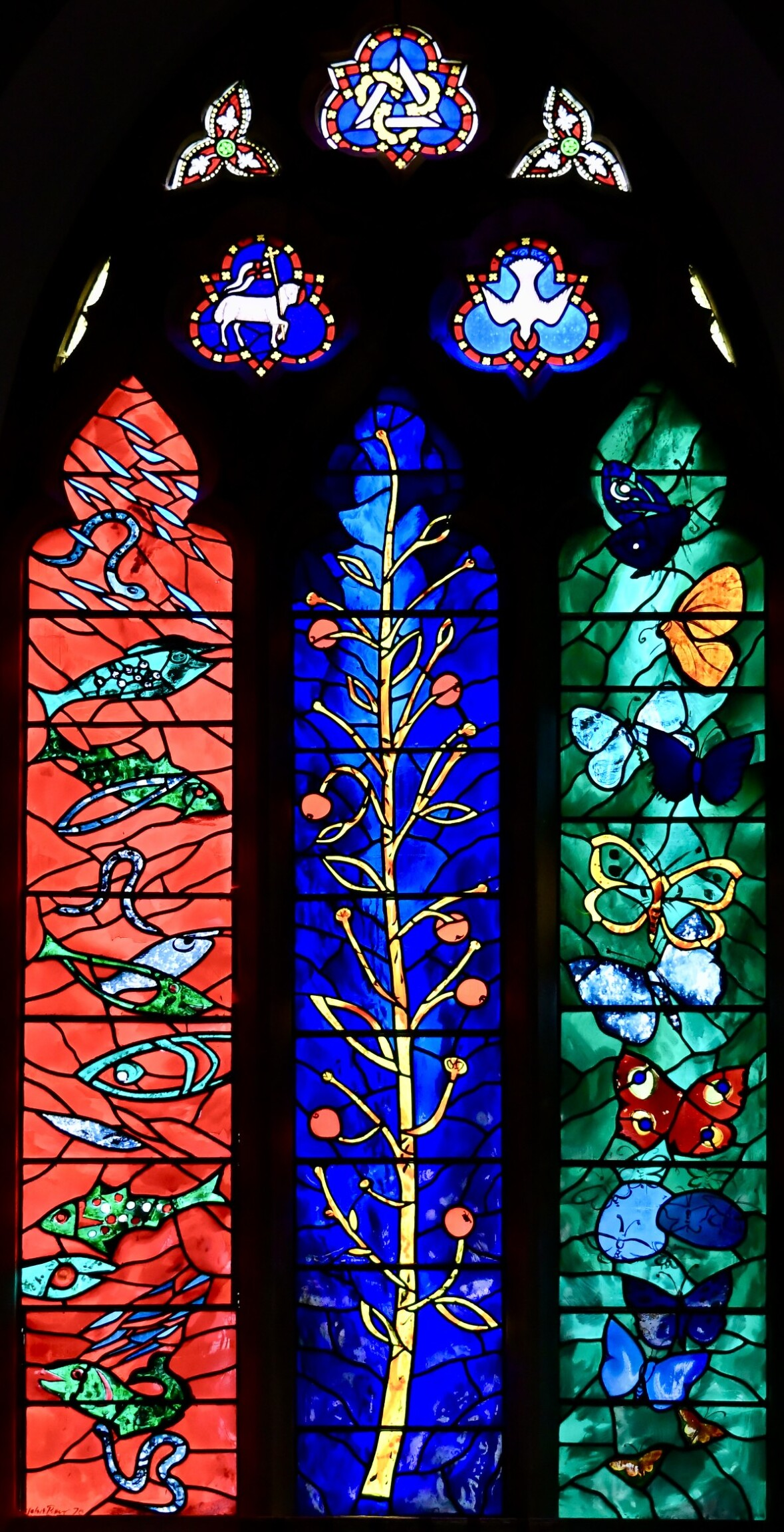
Robin Williamson memorial window by John Piper

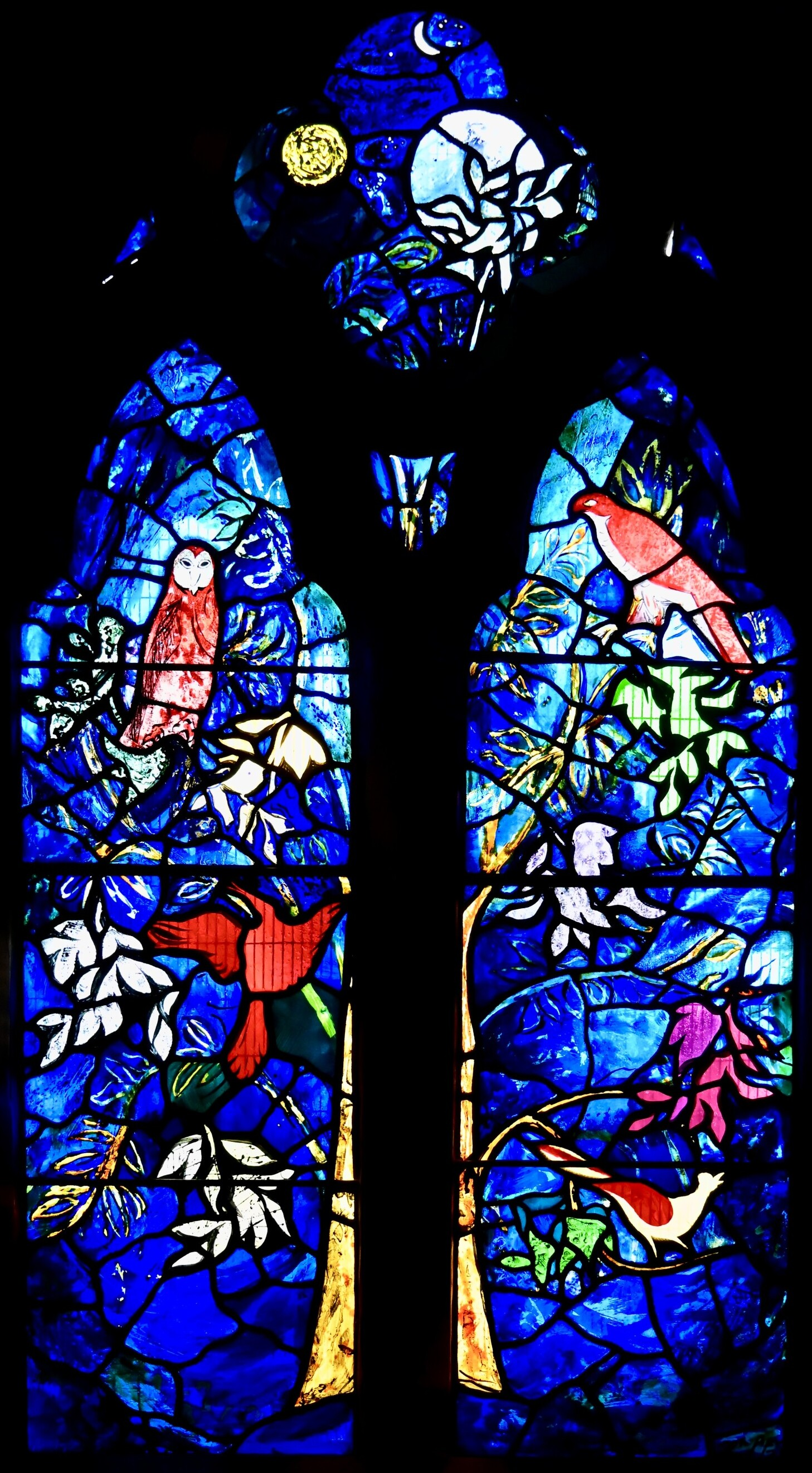
Peter Fleming memorial window by John Piper
