= Lucy Fleming =

British actress

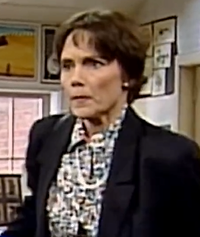
- Lucy Fleming in "Back to School Mr. Bean" (1994)
- Born: Eve Lucinda Fleming; 15 May 1947 (age 79); Nettlebed, Oxfordshire, England
- Occupation: Actress
- Years active: 1965–present
- Spouses: Joe Laycock (m. 1971; died 1980) Simon Williams (m. 1986)
- Children: 3
- Parent(s): Peter Fleming; Celia Johnson
- Relatives: Valentine Fleming (grandfather); Evelyn St. Croix Fleming (grandmother); Ian Fleming (uncle); Amaryllis Fleming (half-aunt)

Eve Lucinda "Lucy" Fleming (born 15 May 1947) is a British actress.

== Early life and ancestry ==
Fleming was born in Nettlebed, England. She is the second daughter of actress Celia Johnson and writer Peter Fleming, the brother of James Bond author Ian Fleming. She is a granddaughter of Valentine Fleming, a Conservative Member of parliament who was killed during World War I in May 1917, and of his widow, Evelyn. Amaryllis Fleming was the actress's half-aunt, fathered by Welsh painter Augustus John during his relationship with Evelyn.

Fleming spent part of her childhood growing up in New Zealand: "My parents packed me off to some friends in New Zealand when I was 16, hoping I would grow up a little and perhaps change my mind about acting. I was quite a tomboy. I ended up at the Bay of Islands, which was just the most beautiful place in the world. I was meant to be looking after the friends' little boy, but I didn't have a clue, and I don't recall doing much of that at all. I loved the country, though."

== Career ==
Fleming is perhaps best known for her role as Jenny Richards in the BBC post-apocalyptic drama series Survivors, which originally aired from 1975 to 1977. Jenny is the only character to appear in both the first and last episodes of the show.

Her numerous credits in other British television series include The Avengers, Lydia Bennet in BBC's 1967 Pride and Prejudice series, Maud Ruthyn on the Season 4 episode "Uncle Silas" of the anthology series Mystery and Imagination, Smiley's People, Mr. Bean, the regular role of Jo in Cold Warrior, the first Helen Wycliffe in Wycliffe, A Dance to the Music of Time, Heartbeat, Rosemary & Thyme and Kingdom. Between 2016 and 2017, and again since 2024, she has appeared on the long-running radio soap opera The Archers as Miranda Elliott, who entered the series as the wife of minor tycoon Justin but subsequently reached a divorce settlement following his affair with Lilian Bellamy. She returned to the role as a love interest for Brian Aldridge, to ex-husband Justin's considerable chagrin. Justin is played by Simon Williams, her real-life husband.

== Personal life ==
Fleming has been married twice; first to Joseph William Peter Laycock, with whom she had a daughter and two sons. Her husband and her daughter drowned on 14 December 1980 in a boating accident on the River Thames. She married her second husband, the actor Simon Williams, in 1986.

Her uncle Ian's literary estate passed to her father Peter after his death. Since Peter's death, Fleming and her sister Kate have controlled Ian Fleming Publications.
