= Scottish American Investment Company =

UK business

The Scottish American Investment Company
- Type: Public
- Traded as: LSE: SAIN; FTSE 250 component
- Industry: Investment management
- Founded: 1873; 153 years ago
- Headquarters: Edinburgh, Scotland, UK
- Key people: James Dow, Manager; Ross Mathison, Deputy Manager
- Website: www.saints-it.com

The Scottish American Investment Company is a publicly traded investment trust. It invests in a broad range of UK and international assets. The Scottish American Investment Company is managed by Baillie Gifford & Co Limited, the Edinburgh-based investment management partnership. It is listed on the London Stock Exchange and is a constituent of the FTSE 250 Index.

== History ==
SAINTS was initially formed as The Scottish American Investment Company Limited by William Menzies in March 1873. Menzies was an Edinburgh lawyer who had visited the United States on several occasions during the 1860s and was struck during those visits by the wealth of investment opportunities in that young and rapidly growing nation. Other participants were the Scottish emigrant American banker John Stewart Kennedy and Dundee and later London financier Robert Fleming.

As well as adapting its investment portfolio to changing conditions, the Company has also had to be flexible in how it conducts its affairs. Until 1970, the Company managed its investments itself but this changed in 1970 when Stewart Fund Managers Limited was appointed to manage SAINTS. Stewart Fund Managers and various successor companies acted as SAINTS' manager from that point until 31 December 2003 when management of the portfolio passed to Baillie Gifford & Co Limited.
