= Ella Maillart =

Swiss adventurer and travel writer

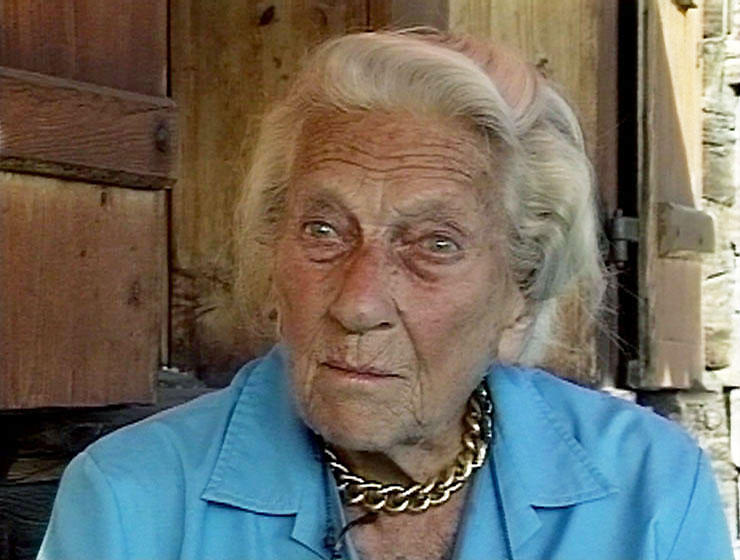
Ella Maillart, one of the great travelers of the 20th century

Ella Maillart (or Ella K. Maillart; 20 February 1903, Geneva – 27 March 1997, Chandolin) was a Swiss adventurer, travel writer and photographer, as well as a sportswoman.

== Early life ==
Ella 'Kini' Maillart was the second child, born to a wealthy fur trader from Geneva. Her father was Swiss and her mother was Danish. At the age of 20 she and a friend sailed from Cannes to Corsica, then to Sardinia, Sicily and Greece. She competed in the 1924 Summer Olympics as a sailor in the Olympic monotype competition where she was the only female competitor and finished ninth out of 17. At this time she was also the captain of the Swiss Women's field hockey team and was an international skier.

== Career ==
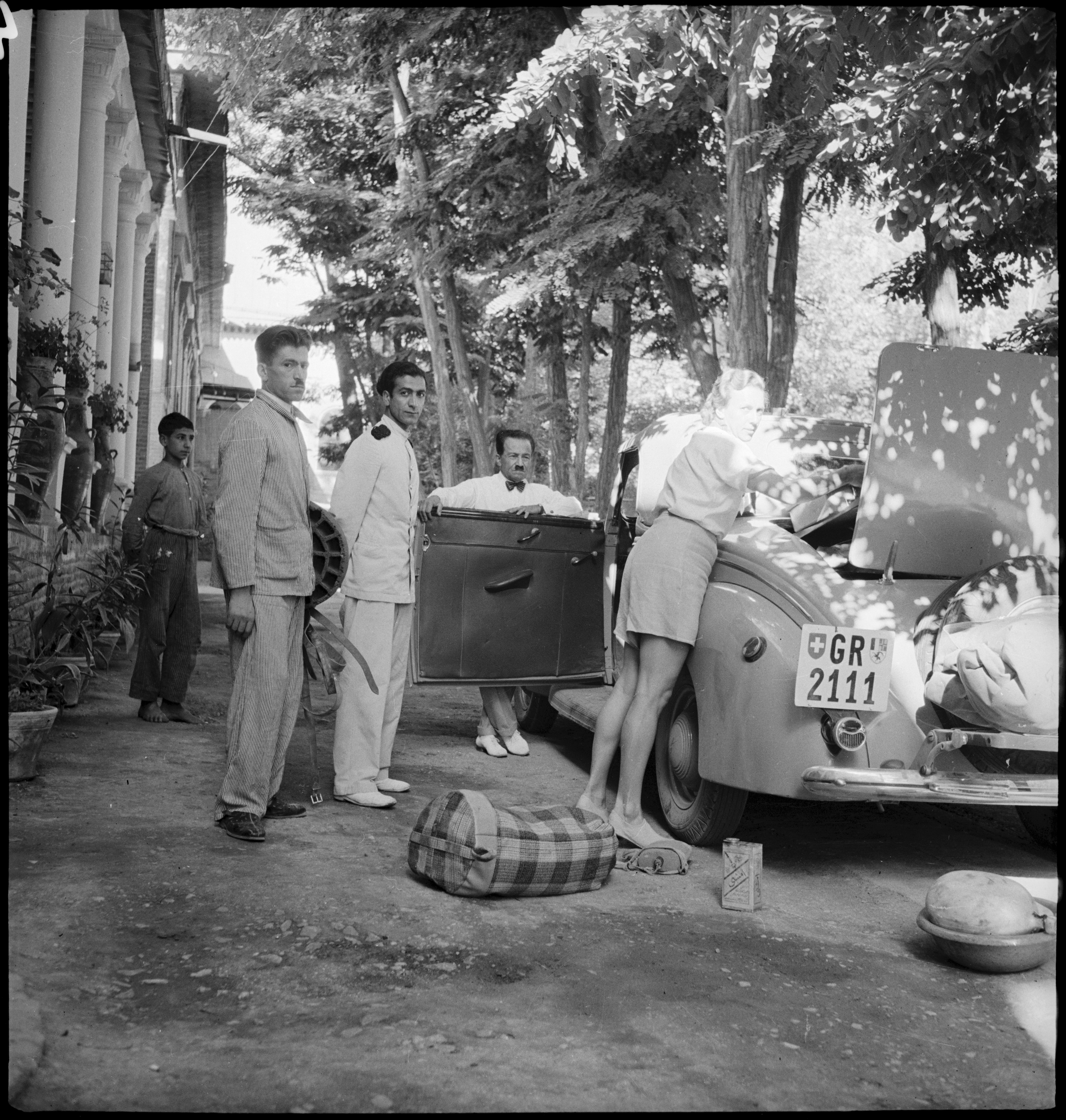
Ella Maillart in Iran 1939/40

From the 1930s onwards she spent years exploring Muslim republics of the USSR, as well as other parts of Asia, and published a rich series of books which, just as her photographs, are today considered valuable historical testimonies. Her early books were written in French but later she began to write in English. Turkestan Solo describes a journey in 1932 in Soviet Turkestan. Photos from this journey are now displayed in the Ella Maillart wing of the Karakol Historical Museum. In 1934, the French daily Le Petit Parisien sent her to Manchuria to report on the situation under the Japanese occupation. It was there that she met Peter Fleming, a well-known writer and correspondent of The Times, with whom she would team up to cross China from Peking to Srinagar (3,500 miles), much of the route being through hostile desert regions and steep Himalayan passes. The journey started in February 1935 and took seven months to complete, involving travel by train, on lorries, on foot, horse and camelback. Their objective was to ascertain what was happening in Xinjiang (then also known as Sinkiang or Chinese Turkestan) where the Kumul Rebellion had just ended. Maillart and Fleming met the Hui Muslim forces of General Ma Hushan. Ella Maillart later recorded this trek in her book Forbidden Journey, while Peter Fleming's parallel account is found in his News from Tartary. In 1937 Maillart returned to Asia for Le Petit Parisien to report on Afghanistan, Iran and Turkey, while in 1939 she undertook a trip from Geneva to Kabul by car, in the company of fellow Swiss writer, Annemarie Schwarzenbach. The Cruel Way is the title of Maillart's book about this experience, cut short by the outbreak of the Second World War.

She spent the war years at Tiruvannamalai in the South of India, learning from different teachers about Advaita Vedanta, one of the schools of Hindu philosophy. On her return to Switzerland in 1945, she lived in Geneva and at Chandolin, a mountain village in the Swiss Alps. She continued to ski until late in life and last returned to Tibet in 1986. She was pioneer of color photography before the Second World War.

== Legacy ==
Ella Maillart's manuscripts and documents are kept at the Bibliothèque de Genève (Library of the City of Geneva), her photographic work is deposited at the Musée de l'Élysée in Lausanne, and her documentary films (on Afghanistan, Nepal and South India) are part of the collection of the Swiss Film Archive in Lausanne, Switzerland.

== Books by Ella Maillart ==
- Turkestan Solo – One Woman's Expedition from the Tien Shan to the Kizil Kum (her journey from Moscow to Kirghizstan and Uzbekistan in 1932)

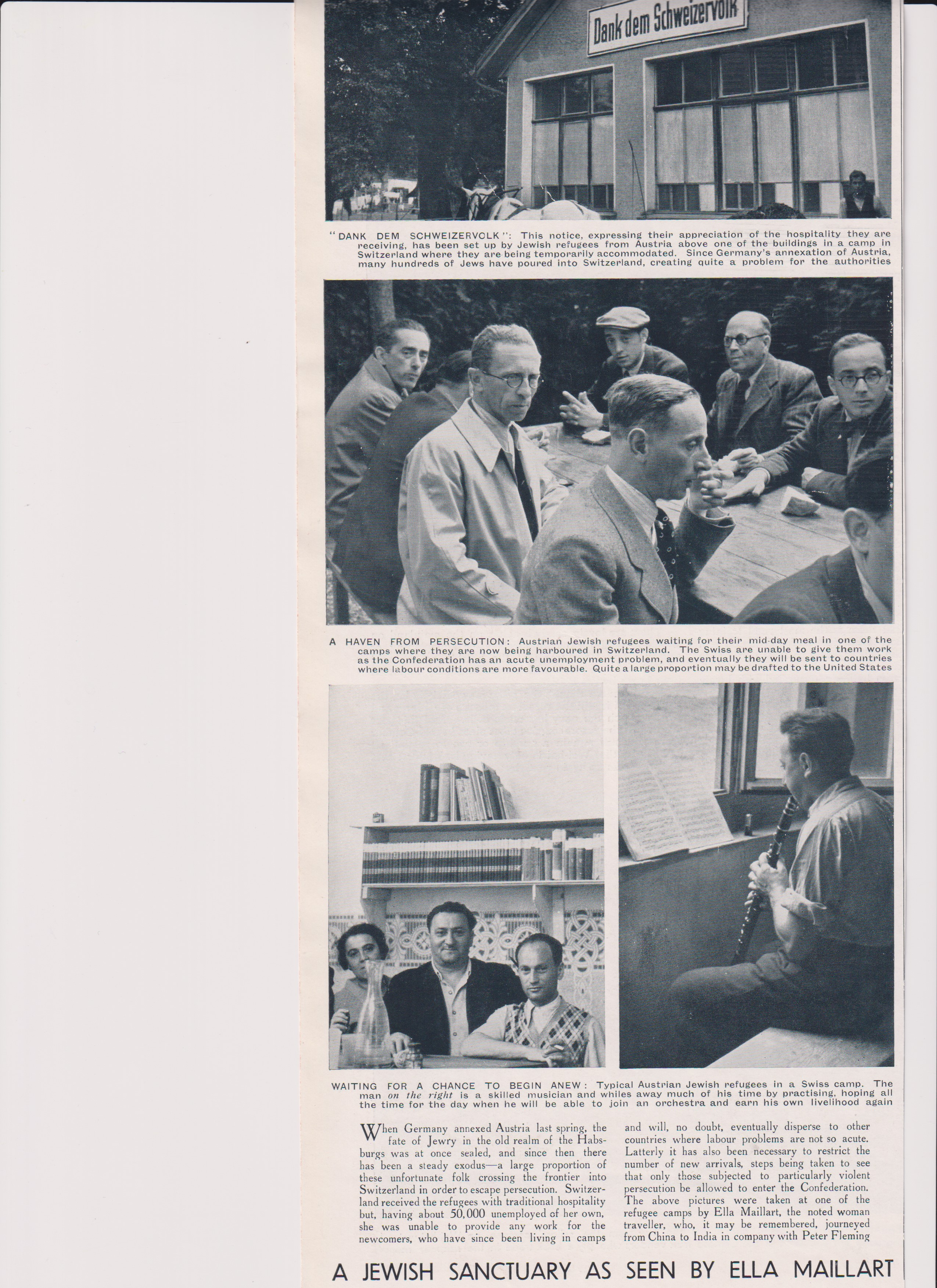
Ella Maillart’s article for The Sphere, 1 October 1938, describes the arrival of Jewish refugees from Austria. Switzerland is portrayed as generous, the refugees as a burden. Article in the collection of the Jewish Museum of Switzerland.

- Forbidden Journey – From Peking to Cashmir (her trek across Asia with Peter Fleming in 1935)
- Gypsy Afloat (an account of her years at sea)
- Cruises and Caravans (autobiographical narrative)
- The Cruel Way (from Geneva to Kabul with Annemarie Schwarzenbach)
- Ti-Puss (the story of her years in India with a tiger cat as her companion)
- The Land of the Sherpas (photographs and texts on her first encounter with Nepal in 1951)

=== In French ===
- Parmi la jeunesse russe – De Moscou au Caucase (about her stay in Moscow and crossing the Caucasus in 1931)
- Oasis interdites - De Pékin au Cachemire, une femme à travers l'Asie centrale en 1935 (her trek across Asia with Peter Fleming in 1935) ISBN 978-2228895170
- La vie immédiate (Ella Maillart's photographs and texts by Nicolas Bouvier)
- Ella Maillart au Népal (photographs taken in 1951 and 1965 during a trek to the base camp of Mount Everest)
- Cette réalité que j'ai pourchassée (letters to her parents, 1925–1941)
- Ella Maillart sur les routes de l'Orient (the most evocative photographs she took during her travels)
- Chandolin d'Anniviers (photographs and texts about her mountain village)
- Envoyée spéciale en Manchourie (a series of articles written in 1934 for the French daily Le Petit Parisien)

== Videos and films (in French only) ==
- Ella Maillart, écrivain. Un entretien avec Bertil Galland, 54 min., Les Films Plans fixes, Lausanne, 1984
- Ella Maillart chez Bernard Pivot (émission La vie est un long fleuve tranquille), INA, France, 1989
- Entretiens avec Ella Maillart: Le Monde mon héritage (radio interviews and the film Les itinéraires d'Ella Maillart, a 1973 Swiss TV production), 2009.
- "Double Journey" 43 minutes. A documentary about her 1939 trip by auto from Switzerland to Afghanistan in the company of Annemarie Schwarzenbach. The film was presented at the National Gallery of Art in Washington by its director Antonio Bigini in March 2016.

== Publications concerning Ella Maillart ==
- News from Tartary by Peter Fleming, 1936
- Mount Ida by Monk Gibbon, 1948
- A Forgotten Journey by Peter Fleming, 1952
- Kini, le monde à bras le corps. Une biographie d’Ella Maillart, by Ingrid Thobois et Géraldine Alibeu, 2019

== Honours ==
- Prix Schiller, Switzerland (1953)
- Sir Percy Sykes Memorial Medal of the Royal Society for Asian Affairs, London (1955)
- Prix quadriennal de la Ville de Genève (1987)
- Prix littéraire Alexandra David-Neel (1989)
- Grand Prix du Livre maritime, Festival de Concarneau (1991)
- Prix et Médaille Léon Dewez de la Société de Géographie de Paris (1994)
