= Joyce Grove =

Country house in Oxfordshire, England

Joyce Grove is a country house built in a Jacobethan style in Nettlebed, Oxfordshire, England. It was formerly owned by Sue Ryder (charity) which, until March 2020 operated its Nettlebed Palliative Care Facility at Joyce Grove at Nettlebed in Henley-On-Thames, Oxfordshire. Joyce Grove is located approximately 67 kilometres (42 mi) west of London.

Completed in 1908, Joyce Grove is a large Jacobethan style building designed by Charles Edward Mallows (1864–1915) for Robert Fleming (1845–1933), founder of Robert Fleming and Co. merchant bank. Joyce Grove is listed Grade II on the National Heritage List for England.

== History ==
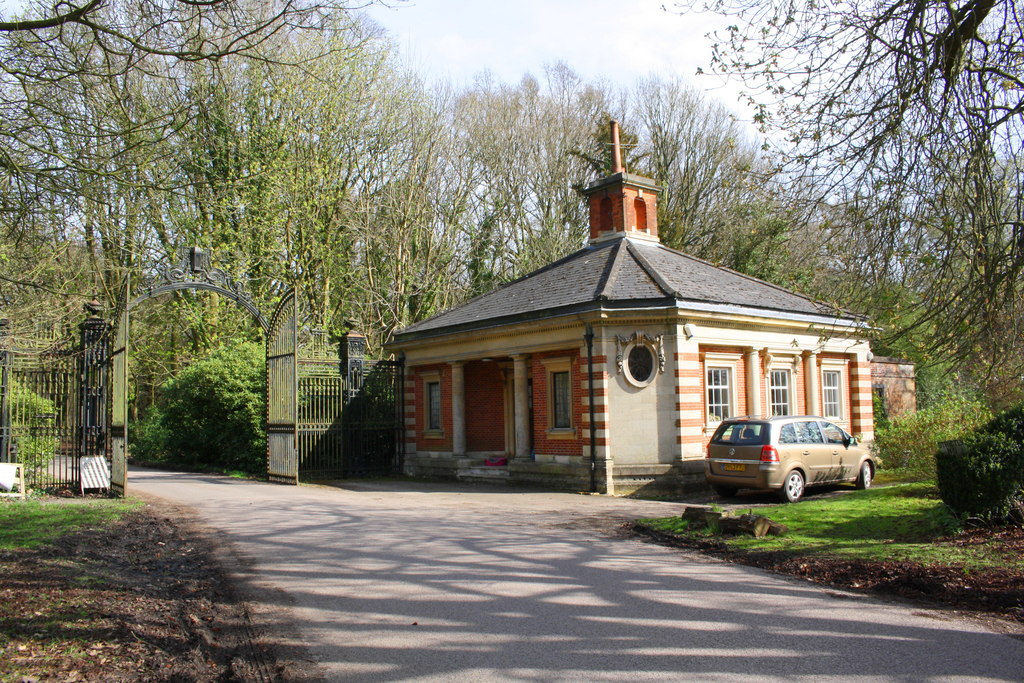
Lodge at the entrance gate of Joyce Grove

As early as 1637 Joyce Grove, named for Cornet George Joyce, was sold to James Thompson of Wallingford.

By 1840, Joyce Grove was registered as a freehold estate of 33 acres belonging to John Toovey. London businessman H. H. Gardiner purchased Joyce Grove estate in 1894.

Joyce Grove estate, including a William and Mary style manor house dating from 1725, was incorporated into the main Nettlebed estate in 1895.

In 1903, Robert Fleming, a Scottish banker, purchased the Nettlebed Estate which included 2000 acres, cottages, clayworks, and Joyce Grove estate with its manor house and land. Shortly after purchasing Joyce Grove, Robert Fleming tore down the older manor house and in its place he commissioned Charles Edward Mallows of Bedford and London to build a replacement. The main construction material was red brick with Bath stone dressings. The house was completed in 1908. The huge building and its grounds provided many jobs for residents of Nettlebed as gardeners, servants, and grooms.

On November 14, 1913, a fire damaged the roof and the mansion was rebuilt and enlarged.

Robert Fleming's grandson, Ian Fleming, author of the James Bond novels, spent much of his childhood at Joyce Grove.

At Robert Fleming's death in 1933, his son Philip Fleming inherited the entire Nettlebed estate including Joyce Grove. In 1937, Philip gave Joyce Grove to Peter Fleming, his nephew. The next year, Peter donated it to St Mary's Hospital, who used it as a convalescent home.

By the 1950s, St Mary's Hospital had partnered with Royal Berkshire Hospital to train nurses at Joyce Grove.

Sue Ryder Charity purchased Joyce Grove mansion and estate from St Mary's and opened Joyce Grove as the Nettlebed Palliative Care Hospice, in 1979.

In November 2011 Sue Ryder Charity announced that the hospice was for sale and that they intended to vacate the building in 2013 when palliative care was to be transferred to Townlands Community Hospital in Henley-on-Thames. However, the project was delayed due to the re-structure of the NHS, so the transfer of palliative services was scheduled to take place in May 2016. In December 2014 however, Sue Ryder announced that they would no longer be moving to 'Townlands' and would continue providing care at Nettlebed Hospice. In January 2022 it was announced that the site had been sold to Beechcroft Developments of Wallingford for conversion to a residential care home.

== Movie and television location ==
Joyce Grove has been a filming location for British television shows, documentaries and one movie. Joyce Grove was Deverill Hall in "Right Ho, Jeeves" a 1992 episode of the TV series Jeeves and Wooster. Stock footage of Joyce Grove was used in the 2000 biographical documentary "Ian Fleming: 007's Creator". In the Midsomer Murders TV series, Joyce Grove was Bledlow Manor for the 2008 episode "Blood Wedding". Joyce Grove was shown as the exterior of Meadowbrook School for the 2009 TV series episode "Agatha Christie's Poirot : Cat Among the Pigeons" and also as Hunterbury House for the 2003 TV series episode "Agatha Christie's Poirot: Sad Cypress". Filming of the documentary "The Real Casino Royale" was done at several locations including Joyce Grove. In the 2013 movie The Imitation Game, about World War II code breaker Alan Turing, Joyce Grove was used for exterior shots of Bletchley Park. It featured in HBO's UK-based fantasy/super hero show The Nevers. It was also used as the manor Fawney Rig in Netflix's television adaptation of The Sandman.
