= Cat Among the Pigeons =

1959 Poirot novel by Agatha Christie

- First edition (US)
- Author: Agatha Christie
- Cover artist: Salem Tamer
- Language: English
- Series: Hercule Poirot
- Genre: Crime novel
- Publisher: Collins Crime Club (UK); Dodd, Mead & Co. (UK)
- Publication date: 2 November 1959
- Publication place: United Kingdom
- Media type: Print (hardback & paperback)
- Pages: 256 (first edition, hardcover)
- Preceded by: Dead Man's Folly
- Followed by: The Clocks

Cat Among the Pigeons is a mystery novel by the English writer Agatha Christie, first published in the UK by the Collins Crime Club on 2 November 1959, and in the US by Dodd, Mead and Company in March 1960 with a copyright date of 1959. The UK edition retailed at twelve shillings and sixpence (12/6), and the US edition at $2.95.

It features Christie's Belgian detective, Hercule Poirot, who makes a very late appearance in the final third of the novel. The emphasis on espionage in the early part of the story relates it to Christie's international adventures (such as They Came to Baghdad) and to the Tommy and Tuppence stories.

== Plot summary ==
A revolution takes place in a Middle Eastern city-state known as Ramat. Knowing that he is unlikely to survive the violence, Prince Ali Yusuf entrusts his best friend and pilot, Bob Rawlinson, to smuggle a fortune in jewels out of the country. Rawlinson conceals the gems within the hollow of the handle of a tennis racquet belonging to his niece Jennifer, the daughter of his sister Joan, without telling them. Unbeknownst to him, a mysterious woman watches him from the neighbouring balcony. The Prince and Rawlinson die in a plane crash while attempting to flee Ramat.

Three months later, Jennifer prepares to attend Meadowbank School, a prestigious girls' independent school in England. Its staff includes Miss Bulstrode, the school's founder and headmistress; Miss Chadwick, a co-founder of the school and teacher of mathematics; Miss Vansittart, who has taught German at the school for several years; Miss Rich, who has taught English Literature at the school for 18 months; Miss Johnson, the girl's matron; Miss Angèle Blanche, the new French teacher; Grace Springer, the new gym teacher; Ann Shapland, Miss Bulstrode's new secretary; and Adam Goodman, a new gardener. As Miss Bulstrode is nearing retirement, she is deciding upon her successor. She believes Miss Chadwick is too old to take over, and is considering both Miss Vansittart, who behaves almost like a second edition of Miss Bulstrode, and Miss Rich, who is young and has many ideas of her own.

One night, Miss Chadwick and Miss Johnson notice a light in the sports pavilion and hear a gunshot; upon investigating, they find Miss Springer murdered. When the police begin to investigate, Goodman reveals to Inspector Kelsey, and later to Miss Bulstrode, that he works for British Intelligence. He is at Meadowbank to track down the gems Rawlinson smuggled out, by monitoring Prince Ali Yusuf's cousin, Shaista, who is attending the school. Meanwhile, Jennifer complains to her friend Julia Upjohn that her racquet no longer feels balanced, and they swap racquets. Later, a strange woman approaches Jennifer to present her with a new racquet, claiming it is from Jennifer's Aunt Gina, and takes the old racquet in exchange. However, the sharper Julia finds this suspicious, and Aunt Gina later writes to reveal that she had not sent Jennifer a new racquet.

The following weekend, Shaista is kidnapped by someone posing as her uncle's chauffeur. That night, Miss Vansittart is murdered with a sandbag in the Sports Pavilion. After Jennifer and many other students are fetched home by worried parents, Julia investigates the racquet she swapped with Jennifer and finds the smuggled jewels. When someone attempts to enter Julia's room during the night, she quickly flees the school to tell her story to Hercule Poirot, whom she has heard stories about from her Aunt Maureen (Mrs. Summerhayes from Mrs. McGinty's Dead).

While Poirot is at Meadowbank investigating the murders, Miss Blanche is murdered with a sandbag. Interviewing Miss Bulstrode, Poirot learns that Julia's mother, Mrs. Upjohn, who once worked in British counterintelligence during the war, recognized a fellow agent at the school on the first day of term.

Poirot eventually reveals to all that the Shaista who attended Meadowbank was an imposter; the real Shaista was kidnapped by a group seeking Prince Ali Yusuf's jewels. When the imposter did not find them, the group extracted her from the school before the uncle of the real Shaista could expose her. Poirot briefly focuses attention on Miss Rich as a potential suspect, so he can put the true murderer at ease. He then reveals that Miss Springer was killed because she caught the killer searching for the tennis racquet. Miss Blanche was killed when she attempted to blackmail the killer.

Through Mrs. Upjohn, Poirot exposes Ann Shapland as a ruthless espionage agent known as "Angelica". Miss Shapland had been in Ramat three months earlier, and was the woman who had witnessed Rawlinson concealing the gems in Jennifer's racquet. Before Miss Shapland is arrested, she attempts to shoot Mrs. Upjohn. As Miss Bulstrode tries to shield Mrs. Upjohn, Miss Chadwick steps in to protect Miss Bulstrode and is fatally wounded. Miss Shapland is disarmed and taken away; Poirot then reveals that the second murder was committed by Miss Chadwick, who was jealous of Miss Vansittart's better qualifications as Mrs. Bulstrode's possible successor. Miss Chadwick came upon Miss Vansittart alone in the Sports Pavilion, and struck her down in a fit of madness.

In the aftermath of the investigation, Miss Bulstrode appoints Miss Rich as her partner and successor, with both focusing on rebuilding Meadowbank and its reputation. Meanwhile, Poirot turns over the gems to a Mr. Robinson, who turns them over to Prince Ali Yusuf's secret wife; they had married and had a son while Yusuf was a student in England. Julia Upjohn receives an emerald as a reward.

== Characters ==
- Hercule Poirot, the famed Belgian detective
- Inspector Kelsey, the investigating officer
- "Adam Goodman", an operative for Special Branch, working undercover at Meadowbank as a gardener
- Honoria Bulstrode, headmistress of Meadowbank School for Girls
- Ann Shapland, Miss Bulstrode's secretary
- Elspeth Johnson, the matron
- Miss Chadwick, a long-serving and senior teacher of mathematics who helped found Meadowbank
- Eleanor Vansittart, a senior teacher, set to succeed Miss Bulstrode
- Grace Springer, a sports teacher
- Angèle Blanche, a French teacher who is using the passport and teaching history of her late sister to get this good position.
- Eileen Rich, a teacher
- Miss Blake, a teacher
- Miss Rowan, a teacher
- Princess Shaista, the cousin of the late Prince Ali Yusuf of Ramat
- Prince Ali Yusuf, hereditary Sheikh of Ramat
- Bob Rawlinson, the personal pilot of the Prince of Ramat (and the Prince's best friend)
- Jennifer Sutcliffe, niece of Bob Rawlinson and pupil at Meadowbank; daughter of Joan and Henry Sutcliffe
- Lady Veronica Carlton-Sandways, the disruptive and tipsy mother of twin daughters enrolled at the school
- Joan Sutcliffe, Bob Rawlinson's sister and Jennifer's mother
- Henry Sutcliffe, Joan's husband and Jennifer's father
- Julia Upjohn, pupil at Meadowbank and Jennifer's friend
- Mrs Upjohn, Julia Upjohn's mother, and a former British intelligence agent
- Colonel Ephraim Pikeaway, a senior figure in Special Branch, Adam Goodman's superior
- John Edmundson, a member of the Foreign Office; third secretary in the British embassy in Ramat at the time of the revolution.
- Derek O'Connor, a member of the Foreign Office
- "Mr Robinson", a shadowy figure, of importance in international affairs
- Denis Rathbone, Ann Shapland's boyfriend
- Briggs, the gardener

== Literary significance and reception ==
Maurice Richardson of The Observer of 8 November 1959 said, "Some nice school scenes with bogus sheikhs sweeping up in lilac Cadillacs to deposit highly scented and busted houris for education, and backwoods peers shoving hockey-stick-toting daughters out of battered Austins. It's far from vintage Christie, but you'll want to know who."

Robert Barnard: "Girls' school background surprisingly well done, with humour and some liberality of outlook. Some elements are reminiscent of Tey's Miss Pym Disposes. Marred by the international dimension and the spy element, which do not jell with the traditional detective side. Fairly typical example of her looser, more relaxed style."

== Film, TV or theatrical adaptations ==
=== British adaptation ===
An adaptation of the novel was written by Mark Gatiss for the series Agatha Christie's Poirot. It aired 28 September 2008, and starred David Suchet as Hercule Poirot. The supporting cast included Dame Harriet Walter as Miss Bulstrode, Natasha Little as Ann Shapland, Claire Skinner as Miss Rich, Susan Wooldridge as Miss Chadwick, Miranda Raison as Mlle Blanche, Elizabeth Berrington as Miss Springer, Raji James as Prince Ali Yusuf, and Adam Croasdell as Adam Goodman. This adaptation, while primarily faithful to the novel, featured a change in setting to the 1930s, matching that of the TV series. This change necessitated many of the novel's scenes referencing the Middle East, World War II, and the British Secret Service to be rewritten or eliminated. As this change also meant World War I would have occurred at the time Ali Yusuf was meant to be studying in England, the character of his secret wife was removed, and his motives for smuggling out the gems were changed from personal to political. Instead of attacking Miss Vansittart – who is not included in the adaptation – Miss Chadwick attacks Miss Rich, who does survive and accepts Miss Bulstrode's offer of a partnership. In addition, Poirot stays at the school from the outset to help Miss Bulstrode decide upon her successor.

Filming took place primarily at Joyce Grove in Nettlebed, Oxfordshire, with some shots inside the marble hall of Elveden Hall.

=== French adaptation ===
The novel was adapted as the fifth episode of the French television series Les Petits Meurtres d'Agatha Christie. The episode first aired in 2010.

== Publication history ==
- 1959, Collins Crime Club (London), 2 November 1959, Hardcover, 256 pp
- 1960, Dodd Mead and Company (New York), March 1960, Hardcover, 224 pp
- 1961, Pocket Books (New York), Paperback, 216 pp
- 1962, Fontana Books (Imprint of HarperCollins), Paperback, 187 pp
- 1964, Ulverscroft Large-print Edition, Hardcover, 255 pp
- 1976, Pocket Books (New York), 8th printing, February 1976, Paperback, xi, 210 pp

In the UK the novel was first serialised in the weekly magazine John Bull in six abridged instalments from 26 September (Volume 106, Number 2771) to 31 October 1959 (Volume 106, Number 2776) with illustrations by Gerry Fancett. In the US a condensed version of the novel appeared in the November 1959 (Volume LXXVI, Number 11) issue of the Ladies Home Journal with an illustration by Joe DeMers.
