= Evelyn St. Croix Fleming =

English socialite; mother of Ian Fleming (1885–1964)

Evelyn "Eve" Beatrice Sainte Croix Fleming (née Rose; 10 January 1885 – 27 July 1964) was an English socialite known for her flamboyant beauty and being the mother of writer Ian Fleming, creator of the James Bond franchise.

== Life ==
St. Croix Fleming was born in Kensington, London, on 10 January 1885. Her father was George Alfred Sainte Croix Rose (31 January 1854 – 14 February 1926), a captain in the service of the Royal Buckinghamshire Militia (King's Own) and Justice of the Peace (J. P.) for Berkshire, who was the son of solicitor Sir Philip Rose, 1st Baronet and Margaretta Ranking. Her mother was Beatrice Quain (1857 – 4 January 1911), the daughter of physician Sir Richard Quain, 1st Baronet. Further back in her ancestry, St. Croix Fleming was of Irish, Scottish and French Huguenot descent.

On 15 February 1906, she married Conservative politician Valentine Fleming (17 February 1882 – 20 May 1917). Her husband's father settled a quarter of a million pounds on him when they married. By her marriage, she was the mother of four sons: adventurer and travel writer Peter Fleming, author Ian Fleming, Richard Fleming and Michael Fleming. Eve was also the grandmother of actress Lucy Fleming. The family lived in Mayfair in London.

St. Croix Fleming's husband was killed in action by shellfire during World War I in Picardy, France. His obituary in The Times was written by his close friend Winston Churchill.

After her husband's death, St. Croix Fleming inherited his large estate in trust, making her very wealthy. However, the conditions of the money in trust transferred it to others should she ever remarry. St. Croix Fleming became the mistress of painter Augustus John, with whom she had a daughter, the cellist Amaryllis Fleming, born in 1926. She later lived with Henry Paulet, 16th Marquess of Winchester, caring for him in Monte Carlo until his death, in 1962.

During the 1940s and 1950s, St. Croix Fleming resided at The Abbey, Sutton Courtenay. She died on 27 July 1964, only two weeks before the death of her son Ian.

== In popular culture ==
St. Croix Fleming's nickname from her son Ian was M, and Ian may have used his relationship with her as model for M, fictional head of Head of the Secret Intelligence Service and James Bond's boss.
