= Robert Fleming (financier) =

Scottish financier and fund manager (1845–1933)

- Born: 17 March 1845; Dundee, Scotland
- Died: 31 July 1933 (aged 88); Black Mount, Bridge of Orchy, Argyll and Bute, Scotland
- Resting place: St. Bartholemew, Nettlebed, Oxfordshire, England
- Occupations: Banker, philanthropist
- Spouse: Sarah Kate Hindmarsh (m. 1881)
- Children: Valentine Fleming; Philip Fleming
- Relatives: Ian Fleming (grandson); Peter Fleming (grandson)

Robert Fleming (17 March 1845 – 31 July 1933) was a Scottish financier and philanthropist. He was the founder of merchant bank Robert Fleming & Co.

== Early life ==
Robert Fleming was born in 1845 in Dundee. His father was an overseer in a jute mill.

== Career ==
Fleming got his start at the age of 13 working for local textile firm, Messrs Edward Baxter and Son. By 21, he was Edward Baxter's private clerk. In time, Fleming had learned enough about investment procedures from Baxter to oversee the firm's American holdings.

Fleming launched the Scottish American Investment Company in 1873, the first of the Scottish investment trusts. As head of the trust, Fleming invested his clients' capital in American economic expansion. He went on to become an international financier in London, establishing the investment bank that bore his name for more than a century and out of which the Fleming Collection of Scottish art and the Fleming Collection Gallery was born.

A contemporary of J. P. Morgan and a close business associate and friend of Jacob Schiff of Kuhn, Loeb & Co., Fleming was widely known and respected in financial circles on both sides of the Atlantic. He was one of the shrewdest investors of his generation and an acknowledged expert in the financing of American railroads. One of his less successful ventures was the 1908 takeover of the bankrupt works of Algoma Steel in Sault Ste. Marie, Ontario, but he had the foresight to associate with the project James Hamet Dunn, who would come to control the works from 1935.

Fleming bought Joyce Grove in Nettlebed, Oxfordshire in 1903, along with its 2,000-acre estate. He commissioned a new house from the architect C. E. Mallows in 1908.

Fleming became one of the wealthiest men in Europe, with Robert Fleming & Co. remaining one of the few independent British investment houses in London by the turn of the 21st century.

== Philanthropy ==
Fleming made many generous bequests to the city and the new University College. The Fleming Gymnasium (opened in 1905 and now housing Forensic Medicine) still bears his name.

The Fleming Gardens Estate in Dundee was erected as a result of a gift of £155,000 that Fleming made to improve worker's housing. His gift is commemorated in a plaque and balustraded viewpoint at the junction of Clepington Road and Hindmarsh Avenue.

== Personal life ==
In 1881, Fleming married Sarah Kate Hindmarsh (26 August 1857–10 February 1937) of Fife, whom he met at a Congregational Church.

Fleming was the father of Valentine Fleming and Philip Fleming. He was the grandfather of novelist Ian Fleming, who wrote the James Bond novels, and writer Peter Fleming. Sir John Fleming, onetime Lord Provost of Aberdeen and later a local MP, was a younger brother.

== Death ==
Fleming died in 1933 and is buried in St. Bartholomew's Church in Nettlebed. His will was proven on 8 September, with his estate amounting to about £2,174,803 (calculated to be equivalent to £134,573,956 in 2025).
