= Peter Fleming (writer) =

British adventurer and travel writer (1907–1971)

Peter Fleming OBE DL
- Born: Robert Peter Fleming; 31 May 1907; Mayfair, London, England
- Died: 18 August 1971 (aged 64); Bridge of Orchy, Scotland
- Resting place: St. Bartholomew's Churchyard, Nettlebed
- Education: Christ Church, Oxford
- Occupations: Writer; adventurer
- Spouse: Celia Johnson (m. 1935)
- Children: 3, including Lucy
- Parents: Valentine Fleming (father); Evelyn St. Croix Fleming (mother)
- Relatives: Ian Fleming (brother); Amaryllis Fleming (half-sister); Robert Fleming (grandfather)

Lieutenant-Colonel Robert Peter Fleming (31 May 1907 – 18 August 1971) was a British adventurer, journalist, soldier and travel writer. He was the elder brother of Ian Fleming, creator of James Bond, and attained the British military rank of Lieutenant Colonel.

== Early life ==
Peter Fleming was one of four sons of the barrister and member of parliament (MP) Valentine Fleming, who was killed in action during World War I in 1917, having served as MP for Henley from 1910. Fleming was educated at Durnford School and at Eton, where he edited the Eton College Chronicle. The Peter Fleming Owl (the English meaning of "Strix", the name under which he later wrote for The Spectator) is still awarded every year to the best contributor to the Chronicle. He went on from Eton to Christ Church, Oxford, and graduated with a first-class degree in English.

Fleming was a member of the Bullingdon Club during his time at Oxford. On 10 December 1935 he married the actress Celia Johnson (1908–1982), best known for her roles in the films Brief Encounter and The Prime of Miss Jean Brodie.

== Travels ==
=== In Brazil ===
In April 1932 Fleming replied to an advertisement in the personal columns of The Times: "Exploring and sporting expedition, under experienced guidance, leaving England June to explore rivers central Brazil, if possible ascertain fate Colonel Percy Fawcett; abundant game, big and small; exceptional fishing; room two more guns; highest references expected and given." He then joined the expedition, organised by Robert Churchward, to São Paulo, then overland to the rivers Araguaia and Tapirapé, heading towards the last-known position of the Fawcett expedition.

During the inward journey the expedition was riven by increasing disagreements as to its objectives and plans, centred particularly on its local leader, whom Fleming disguised as "Major Pingle" when he wrote about the expedition. Fleming and Roger Pettiward (a school and university friend recruited onto the expedition as a result of a chance encounter with Fleming) led a breakaway group.

This group continued for several days up the Tapirapé to São Domingo, from where Fleming, Pettiward, Neville Priestley and one of the Brazilians hired by the expedition set out to find evidence of Fawcett's fate on their own. After acquiring two Tapirapé guides the party began a march to the area where Fawcett was reported to have last been seen. They made slow progress for several days, losing the Indian guides and Neville to foot infection, before admitting defeat.

The expedition's return journey was made down the River Araguaia to Belém. It became a closely fought race between Fleming's party and "Major Pingle", the prize being to be the first to report home, and thus to gain the upper hand in the battles over blame and finances that were to come. Fleming's party narrowly won. The expedition returned to England in November 1932.

Fleming's book about the expedition, Brazilian Adventure, has sold well ever since it was first published in 1933, and is 2023 still in print (Eland Publishing Ltd., London)

=== In Asia ===
Fleming travelled from Moscow to Peking via the Caucasus, the Caspian, Samarkand, Tashkent, the Turksib Railway and the Trans-Siberian Railway to Peking as a special correspondent of The Times. His experiences were recorded in One's Company (1934). He then went overland in company of Ella Maillart from China via Tunganistan to India on a journey written up in News from Tartary (1936). These two books were combined as Travels in Tartary: One's Company and News from Tartary (1941). All three volumes were published by Jonathan Cape.

According to Nicolas Clifford, for Fleming China "had the aspect of a comic opera land whose quirks and oddities became grist for the writer, rather than deserving any respect or sympathy in themselves". In One's Company, for example, Fleming reports that Beijing was "lacking in charm", Harbin was a city of "no easily definable character". Changchun was "entirely characterless", and Shenyang was "non-descript and suburban". However, Fleming also provides insights into Manchukuo, the Japanese puppet state in Manchuria, which helped contemporary readers to understand Chinese resentment and resistance, and the aftermath of the Kumul Rebellion. In the course of these travels Fleming met and interviewed many prominent figures in Central Asia and China, including the Chinese Muslim General Ma Hushan, the Chinese Muslim Taoyin of Kashgar, Ma Shaowu, and Puyi.

Of Travels in Tartary, Owen Lattimore remarked that Fleming, who "passes for an easy-going amateur, is in fact an inspired amateur whose quick appreciation, especially of people, and original turn of phrase, echoing P. G. Wodehouse in only a very distant and cultured way, have created a unique kind of travel book". Lattimore added that it "is only in the political news from Tartary that there is a disappointment", as, in his view, Fleming offers "a simplified explanation, in terms of Red intrigue and Bolshevik villains, which does not make sense."

Stuart Stevens retraced Peter Fleming's route and wrote his own travel book.

== Second World War ==
Just before war was declared, Fleming, then a reserve officer in the Grenadier Guards, was recruited by the War Office research section investigating the potential of irregular warfare (MIR). His initial task was to develop ideas to assist the Chinese guerrillas fighting the Japanese. He served in the Norwegian campaign with the prototype commando units – Independent Companies – but in May 1940 he was tasked with research into the potential use of the new Local Defence Volunteers (later the Home Guard) as guerrilla troops. His ideas were first incorporated into General Thorne's XII Corps Observation Unit, forerunner of the GHQ Auxiliary Units. Fleming recruited his brother, Richard, then serving in the Faroe Islands, to provide a core of Lovat Scout instructors to his teams of LDV volunteers.

Meanwhile, Fleming wrote a speculative novel called The Flying Visit in which he imagined Adolf Hitler flying to Britain to propose peace with that nation, only to have the United Kingdom let him return in light of the awkward diplomatic quandary he placed the British government in. It proved bizarrely prescient in 1941 when Hitler's Deputy, Rudolf Hess, did that exact excursion into Britain and Britain found their new high ranked Nazi prisoner cumbersome for their foreign and propaganda policies. Fleming learned of Hess's visit while in Cairo, telling Hermione Ranfurly that he thought at first that it was a joke because of his book.

When Colin Gubbins was appointed to head the new Auxiliary Units, he incorporated many of Peter's ideas, which aimed to create secret commando teams of Home Guard in the coastal districts most liable to the risk of invasion. Their role was to launch sabotage raids on the flanks and rear of any invading army, in support of regular troops, but they were never intended as a post-occupation 'resistance' force, having a life expectancy of only two weeks.

Fleming later served in Greece, but his principal service, from 1942 to the end of the war, was as head of D Division, in charge of military deception operations in Southeast Asia, based in New Delhi, India. He was scheduled to take part in the second Chindit operation, but this was cut short by the premature crash landing of a defective glider. The episode is described in an appendix Fleming contributed to Michael Calvert's book on the operation.

Fleming was appointed an Officer of the Order of the British Empire in the 1945 Birthday Honours and in 1948 he was awarded the Order of the Cloud and Banner with Special Rosette by the Republic of China.

== Later life and death ==
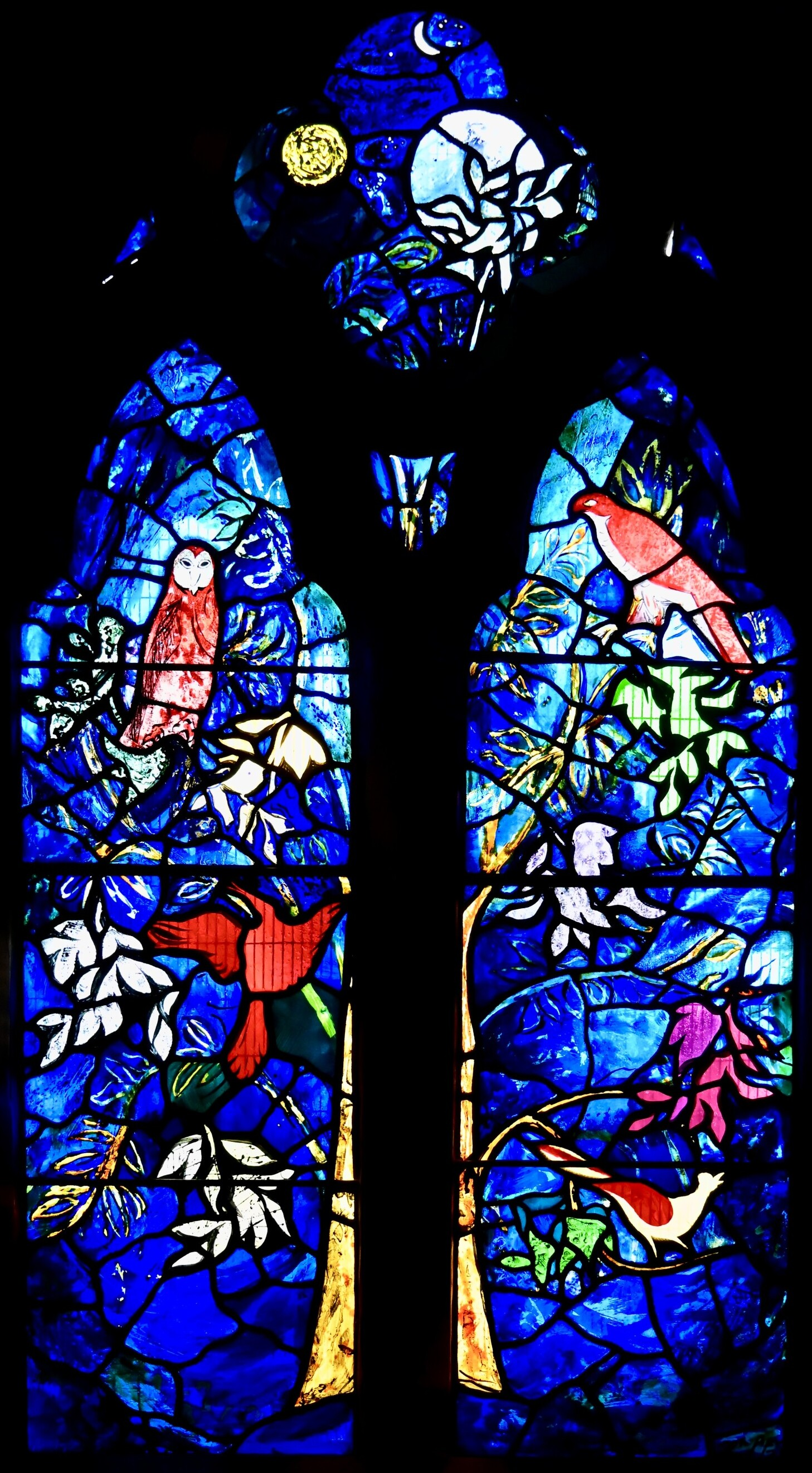
Memorial window by John Piper in Nettlebed Church

After the war Fleming retired to squiredom at Nettlebed, Oxfordshire and was appointed a deputy lieutenant for Oxfordshire on 31 July 1970.

Fleming died on 18 August 1971 from a heart attack while on a shooting expedition near Glen Coe in Scotland. His body was buried in the graveyard of St Bartholomew's Church in Nettlebed, where a stained glass window dedicated to his memory was installed in the church in 1976. Designed by John Piper and made by Patrick Reyntiens, It depicts the Tree of Life with a menagerie of birds of its branches.

Fleming's gravestone has verses he wrote himself:

He travelled widely in far places;
Wrote, and was widely read.
Soldiered, saw some of danger's faces,
Came home to Nettlebed.

The squire lies here, his journeys ended –
Dust, and a name on a stone –
Content, amid the lands he tended,
To keep this rendezvous alone.

== Family ==
After the death of his brother Ian in 1964, Fleming served on the board of Glidrose, a company purchased by Ian to hold the literary rights to his writing, particularly the James Bond novels and short stories.

Peter and Celia Fleming remained married until his death in 1971. He was survived by their three children, including Lucy Fleming.

Fleming was the godfather of the British author and journalist Duff Hart-Davis, who wrote Peter Fleming: A Biography (published by Jonathan Cape in 1974). Duff's father Rupert Hart-Davis, a publisher, was a close friend of Fleming.

== Legacy ==
The Peter Fleming Award, worth £9,000, is given by the Royal Geographical Society for a "research project that seeks to advance geographical science".

Fleming's book about the British military expedition to Tibet in 1903 to 1904 is credited in the Chinese film Red River Valley (1997).

== Quotations ==
- "São Paulo is like Reading, only much farther away." – Brazilian Adventure
- "Public opinion in England is sharply divided on the subject of Russia. On the one hand you have the crusty majority, who believe it to be a hell on earth; on the other you have the half-baked minority who believe it to be a terrestrial paradise in the making. Both cling to their opinions with the tenacity, respectively, of the die-hard and the fanatic. Both are hopelessly wrong." – One's Company
- The recorded history of Chinese civilisation covers a period of four thousand years.

The Population of China is estimated at 450 million.
China is larger than Europe.

The author of this book is twenty-six years old.
He has spent, altogether, about seven months in China.
He does not speak Chinese.

Preface, One's Company

== Fleming's works ==
Fleming was a special correspondent for The Times and often wrote under the pen-name "Strix" (Latin for "screech owl") as an essayist for The Spectator.

=== Non-fiction ===
- 1933 Brazilian Adventure – Exploring the Brazilian jungle in search of the lost Colonel Percy Fawcett. (2023, ISBN 9781780602004)
- 1934 One's Company: A Journey to China in 1933 – Travels through the USSR, Manchuria and China. Later reissued as half of Travels in Tartary.
- 1936 News from Tartary: A Journey from Peking to Kashmir – Journey from Peking to Srinagar via Sinkiang. He was accompanied on this journey by Ella Maillart (Kini). Later reissued as half of Travels in Tartary.
- 1952 A Forgotten Journey – A diary Fleming kept during a journey through Russia and Manchuria in 1934. Reprinted as To Peking: A Forgotten Journey from Moscow to Manchuria (2009, ISBN 978-1-84511-996-6)
- 1953 Introduction to Seven Years in Tibet by Heinrich Harrer published by Rupert Hart-Davis, London
- 1955 Tibetan Marches – A translation from French of Caravane vers Bouddha by André Migot
- 1956 My Aunt's Rhinoceros: And Other Reflections — A collection of essays written (as "Strix") for The Spectator. Published by Rupert Hart-Davis, London.
- 1956 Noblesse Oblige: An Enquiry into the Identifiable Characteristics of the English Aristocracy — co-authored (as "Strix") with Alan S. C. Ross, Nancy Mitford, Evelyn Waugh, Christopher Sykes and John Betjeman. Illustrated by Osbert Lancaster.
- 1957 Invasion 1940 — an account of the planned Nazi invasion of Britain and British anti-invasion preparations of the Second World War. Published in the United States as Operation Sea Lion
- 1957 With the Guards to Mexico: And Other Excursions — A collection of essays written for The Spectator. Published by Rupert Hart-Davis, London.
- 1958 The Gower Street Poltergeist — A collection of essays written for The Spectator.
- 1959 The Siege at Peking — An account of the Boxer Rebellion and the European-led siege of the Imperial capital.
- 1961 Bayonets to Lhasa: The First Full Account of the British Invasion of Tibet in 1904
- 1961 Goodbye to the Bombay Bowler — A collection of essays written for The Spectator as 'Strix'.
- 1963 The Fate of Admiral Kolchak — a study of the White Army leader Admiral Kolchak who led the anti-Bolshevik movement in Siberia from November 1918 to January 1920.

=== Fiction ===
Books

- 1940 The Flying Visit – A humorous novel about an unintended visit to Britain by Adolf Hitler. Illustrated by David Low.
- 1942 A Story to Tell; and other Tales — A collection of short stories.
- 1951 The Sixth Column. A Singular Tale of Our Times — A humorous novella, around the idea of random traitors acting merely because they are in position to act, unlike fifth columnists with established ideological or command connections to foreign powers.
- The Sett (unfinished, unpublished)

Short fiction

- "The Kill" (1931)
- "Felipe" (1937)

=== Other ===
- 1932 Spectator's Gallery: Essays, Sketches, Short Stories & Poems from The Spectator — editor with Derek Verschoyle.
- 1933 Variety: Essays, Sketches and Stories — illustrated by Roger Pettiward.
