= One's Company =

Book by Peter Fleming

One's Company: A Journey to China
- Title page for One's Company: A Journey to China (1934)
- Author: Peter Fleming
- Language: English
- Genre: Non-fiction
- Publisher: Cape
- Publication date: 1934
- Publication place: United Kingdom

One's Company: A Journey to China (London: Cape, 1934) is a travel book by Peter Fleming, correspondent for The Times, describing his journey day-by-day from London through Moscow and the Trans-Siberian Railway, then through Japanese-run Manchukuo, then on to Nanking, the capital of China in the 1930s, with a glimpse of “Red China”. It was reissued (with News from Tartary) as half of Travels in Tartary.

Fleming's Preface opens with a self-deprecating observation:

The recorded history of Chinese civilization covers a period of four thousand years.
The population of China is estimated at 450 million.
China is larger than Europe.

The author of this book is twenty-six years old.
He has spent, altogether, about seven months in China.
He does not speak Chinese.

When Fleming gets to China, the reader is rewarded with acid portraits of Chiang Kai-shek, pronouncements on “Red China” and the prospects of Communism (it could never take hold in China), life on the war fronts, and the nature of the Japanese empire. Nicholas J. Clifford observes: "If for Fleming... China remained something of a joke, the joke was less on the country than on the bemused traveler himself.... Even so, the humor ... can sometimes wear a little thin.... there was much about it that still had the aspect of a comic opera land whose quirks and oddities became grist for the writer rather than deserving any respect or sympathy in themselves." Paul French unsympathetically described it as "largely a litany of visits to places he didn't like — except England."
