= News from Tartary =

1936 travel book by Peter Fleming

News from Tartary: A Journey from Peking to Kashmir
- Author: Peter Fleming
- Language: English
- Publication date: 1936

News from Tartary: A Journey from Peking to Kashmir is a 1936 travel book by Peter Fleming, describing his journey and the political situation of Turkestan (historically known as Tartary).

The book recounts Fleming's 3,500 miles (5,600 km) journey from Peking, China to Kashmir, India in 1935. He was accompanied on this journey by Ella Maillart (Kini). "Forbidden Journey" is the book that Maillart wrote about the journey. The journey started on 16 February 1935 and took seven months to complete. The objective of the journey was, as contained within the title of the book, to ascertain what was happening in Tunganistan, a region of Sinkiang (also known as Chinese Turkestan), in the aftermath of the Kumul Rebellion. Fleming met with Ma Shaowu and Ma Hushan while in Xinjiang.

The author notes that "Tartary is not strictly a geographical term, any more than Christendom is", and goes on to point out that Tartary is merely the name given to the place where the Tartars come from. He explains that in his usage it refers to Sinkiang and the highlands bordering it.

The journey took the travellers from Peking to Tungkuan, then Sian, Pingliang, Lanchow, Sining, Dzunchia, Gorumu, Teijinar, Issik Pakte, Cherchen, Niya, Keriya, Khotan, Guma, Karghalik, Yarkand, Kashgar, Tashkurgan, Hunza, Nagar, Gilgit and finally Srinagar.

The book was reissued as one half of Travels in Tartary, with Fleming's One's Company: A Journey to China.

== Quotes ==
- I have travelled fairly widely in 'Communist' Russia (where they supplied me with the inverted commas).
- ... to read a propagandist, a man with vested intellectual interests, is as dull as dining with a vegetarian.
- I know nothing, and care less, about political theory; knavery, oppression and ineptitude, as perpetrated by governments, interest me only in their concrete manifestations, in their impact on mankind: not in their nebulous doctrinal origins.
