= Nettlebed =

Village in the Chiltern Hills, England

Coordinates: 51.578°N 0.990°W

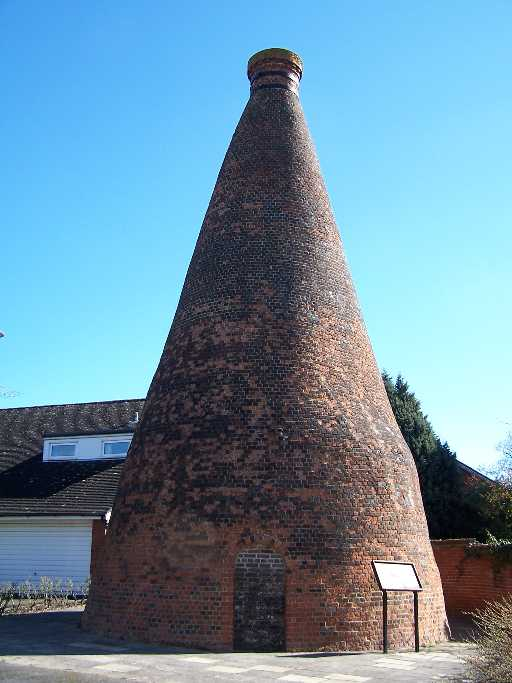
- Pottery kiln, possibly 17th-century

- Location within Oxfordshire
- Area: 6.13 km^{2} (2.37 sq mi)
- Population: 727 (2011 Census)
  - Density: 119/km^{2} (310/sq mi)
- OS grid reference: SU7086
- Civil parish: Nettlebed
- District: South Oxfordshire
- Shire county: Oxfordshire
- Region: South East
- Country: England
- Sovereign state: United Kingdom
- Post town: Henley-on-Thames
- Postcode district: RG9
- Dialling code: 01491
- Police: Thames Valley
- Fire: Oxfordshire
- Ambulance: South Central
- UK Parliament: Henley and Thame
- Website: Nettlebed Community

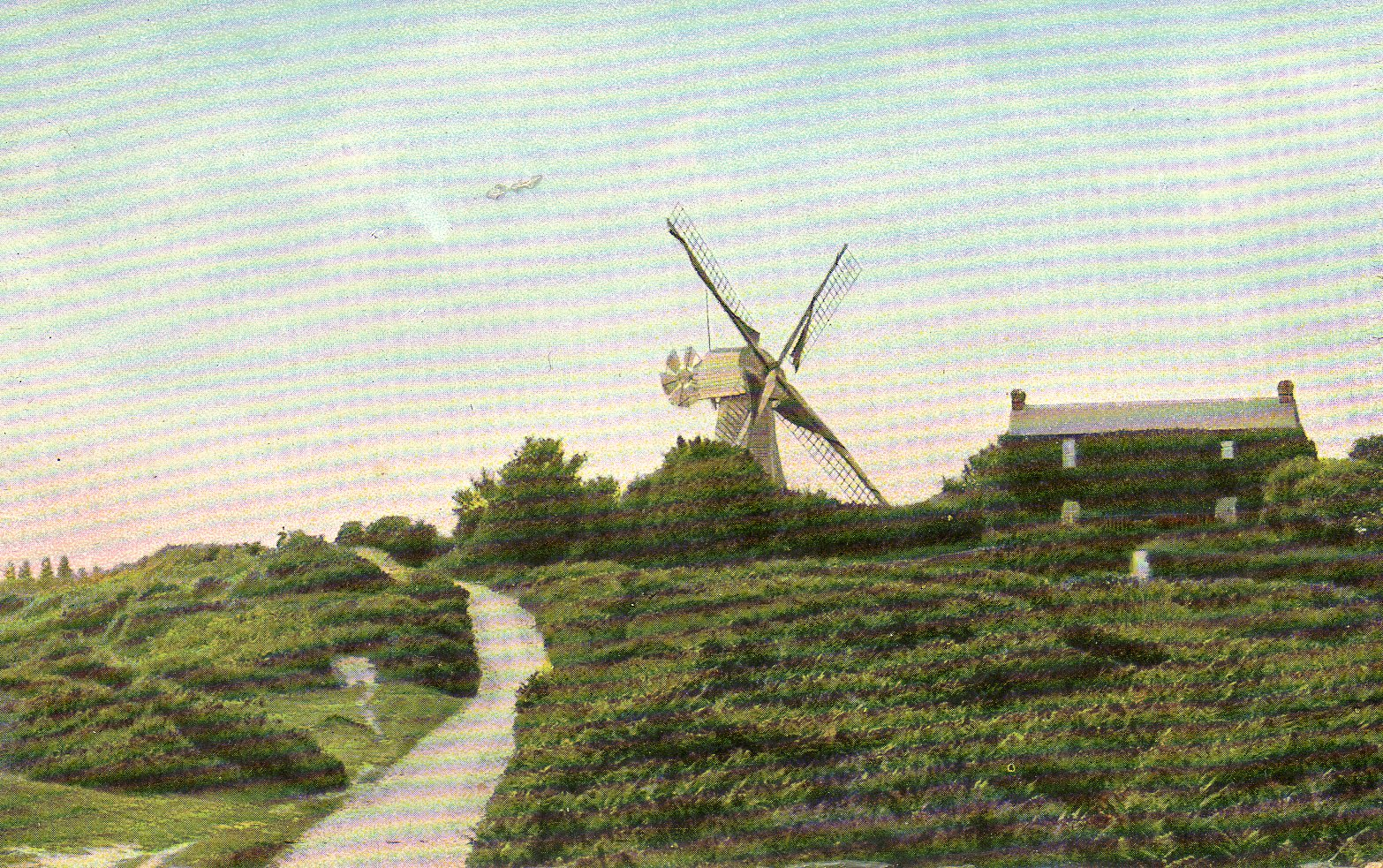
Nettlebed smock mill (postcard, circa 1910)

Nettlebed is a village and civil parish in Oxfordshire in the Chiltern Hills about 4 1/2 miles (7 km) north-west of Henley-on-Thames and 6 miles (10 km) south-east of Wallingford. The parish includes the hamlet of Crocker End, about 1/2 mile (800 m) east of the village. The 2011 Census recorded a parish population of 727.

== Archaeology ==
It is claimed that in the 17th century a "Palæolithic floor" was found in Nettlebed Common. Mesolithic flint microliths and cores have been found in the parish.

== History ==
The earliest known records of the name "Nettlebed" are from the 13th century. The Inquisitiones post mortem record it as Netelbedde in 1252 and 1276. The name does mean a nettlebed: a place overgrown with nettles. Nettlebed village is on an ancient route through the Chiltern Hills between Henley-on-Thames and Wallingford, which for centuries was part of a trunk route between London and Oxford. The road between Henley and Wallingford was made into a turnpike in 1736 and ceased to be a turnpike in 1873. It is now classified as the A4130. Nettlebed's strategic position led to its having several pubs, inns and coaching inns. They included the White Hart, which is 17th-century, and the Bull Inn and Sun Inn, which are 18th-century. Only the White Hart in the High Street is still trading.

Nettlebed had a sub-post office and general store in Watlington Street. It has now ceased trading and is a private house. In 2012 Thierry Kelaart and Patrick Heathcote-Amory, son of Sir Ian Heathcote-Amory were married at St Bartholomew's parish church. Michael Middleton acted as father of the bride and guests included the Duchess of Cambridge. The Old Priest House, on the High Street, is a Grade II listed building.

=== Parish church ===
Nettlebed is served by the Church of St Bartholomew. The Church of England parish of Saint Bartholomew was originally a chapelry of the adjacent parish of Benson. There is a record of the Empress Matilda giving the benefice of Benson, including chapels at Nettlebed and Warborough, to the Augustinian Abbey at nearby Dorchester, Oxfordshire in about 1140. The Medieval church building was replaced in 1845–46 by the present Gothic Revival brick building, designed by a member of the Hakewill family of architects. The only surviving part of the previous church is the lower stages of the brick west tower, which seems to be 18th-century.

The church has some 20th-century stained glass windows, including two designed by John Piper and made by Patrick Reyntiens. One is the chancel east window, in which a central tree of life is flanked by fish on one side and butterflies on the other. The other is the baptistery south window in the south aisle. This shows a tree of life with birds perching in it including an owl, a hawk and a pheasant. The tower has a ring of six bells, all cast by Charles and George Mears of the Whitechapel Bell Foundry in 1846.

=== Joyce Grove ===
The Scottish banker Robert Fleming bought Joyce Grove in 1903, along with its 2,000-acre (810 ha) estate. A new house was commissioned from the architect C.E. Mallows in 1908. After Robert Fleming's death in 1938 the house and its grounds were given to St Mary's Hospital, London. Joyce Grove was used as a convalescent home during the war, and more recently became a Sue Ryder Care Home.

=== Pottery ===
Bricks, tiles and pottery were made in Nettlebed from the second half of the 14th century until the 1930s. In the 15th century Nettlebed supplied ceramic tiles to Abingdon Abbey and bricks to Stonor House. The name "Crocker End" means "Potter's End". One remaining brick "bottle kiln" is preserved in Nuffield. It may be 17th-century. It is a Grade II* listed building. In 1674, George Ravenscroft obtained from Nettlebed, the sand used in the making of the first flint glass.

=== Windmill ===
Nettlebed had what seems to have been the only smock mill in Oxfordshire. It used to be at Chinnor but was moved to a windier site at Nettlebed in about 1825. It was a slender octagonal building with four common sails and a fantail. It burned down in 1912.

== Amenities ==
=== Nettlebed Folk Club ===
The village has a long-established folk club which holds concerts on Monday evenings from 8pm at The Village Club in Nettlebed High Street. The Folk Song Club is a volunteer run, non-profit organisation. It was founded in July 1975 at the Bull Inn. When Brakspear Brewery closed the Bull Inn in 1991, the club moved to its present venue, which has capacity for 200 people. Musicians who have performed at the club include Martin Carthy, Fairport Convention, John Kirkpatrick, Ralph McTell, Show of Hands, Steeleye Span and Richard Thompson. The Club is also known for special performances such as its "Feast of Fiddles'" where a mix of leading national performers and local artists provide themed evenings. In 2002 the club won the BBC Radio 2 Folk Club of the Year Award.

=== Transport ===
Thames Travel bus route X38 links Nuffield with Wallingford and Oxford in one direction and Henley on Thames and Reading, Berkshire in the other. It stops on the A4130 main road at Nettlebed Green, near the brick kiln at the east end of the village. Buses run generally hourly from Mondays to Saturdays. There is no Sunday service.

== Notable residents ==
- Lucy Fleming, actress
- Peter Fleming, writer and traveller
- Celia Johnson, star of the 1945 film Brief Encounter (also Peter Fleming's wife)
- Sir Ninian Stephen, Australian judge and later 20th Governor-General of Australia, born in Nettlebed to Scottish parents in 1923 and emigrated to Australia in 1940
- Philip Strange and his wife Madeline Seymour, actors, lived in Cherry Tree Cottage during the 1930s.

== See also ==
- Crocker End House – former rectory

== Gallery ==
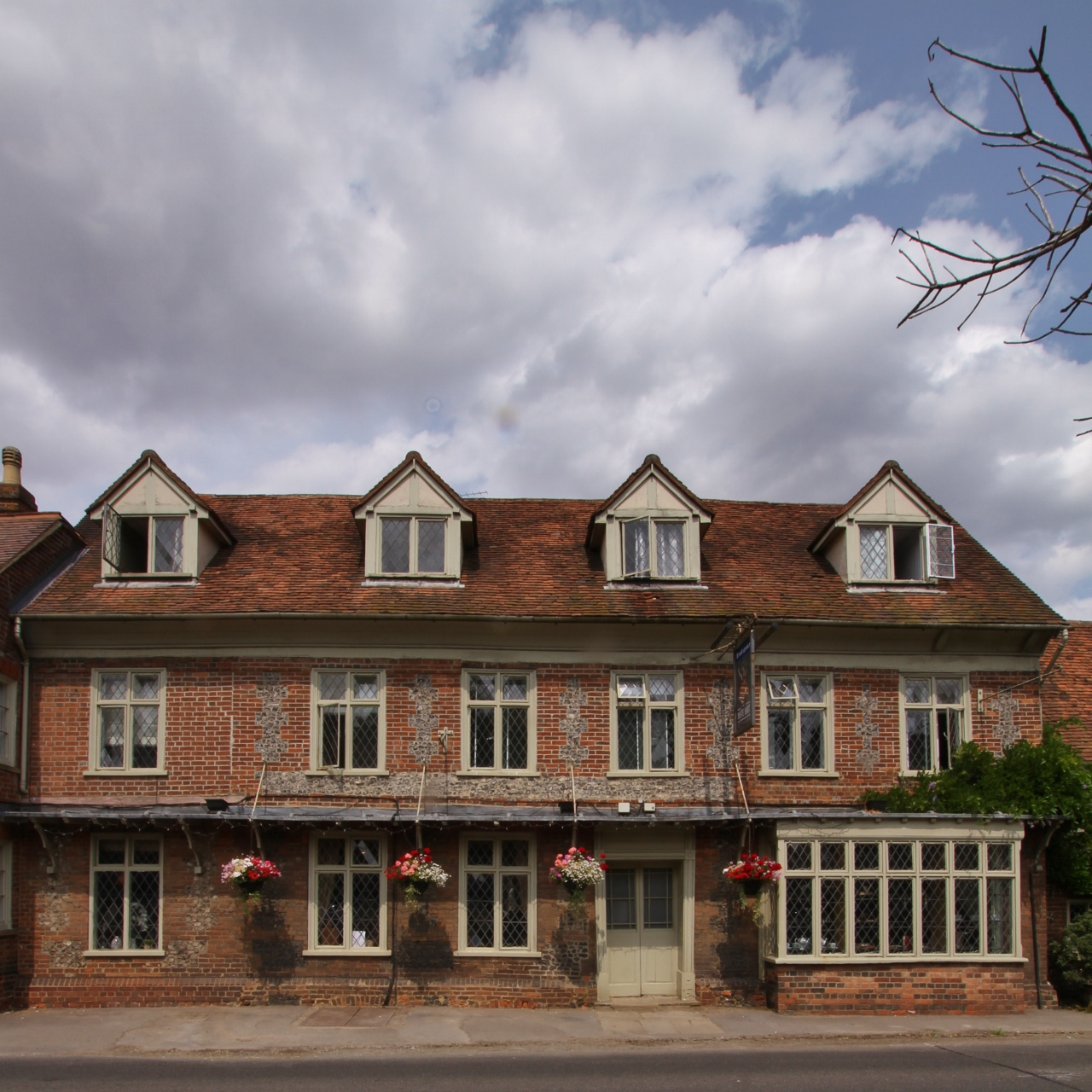
The White Hart

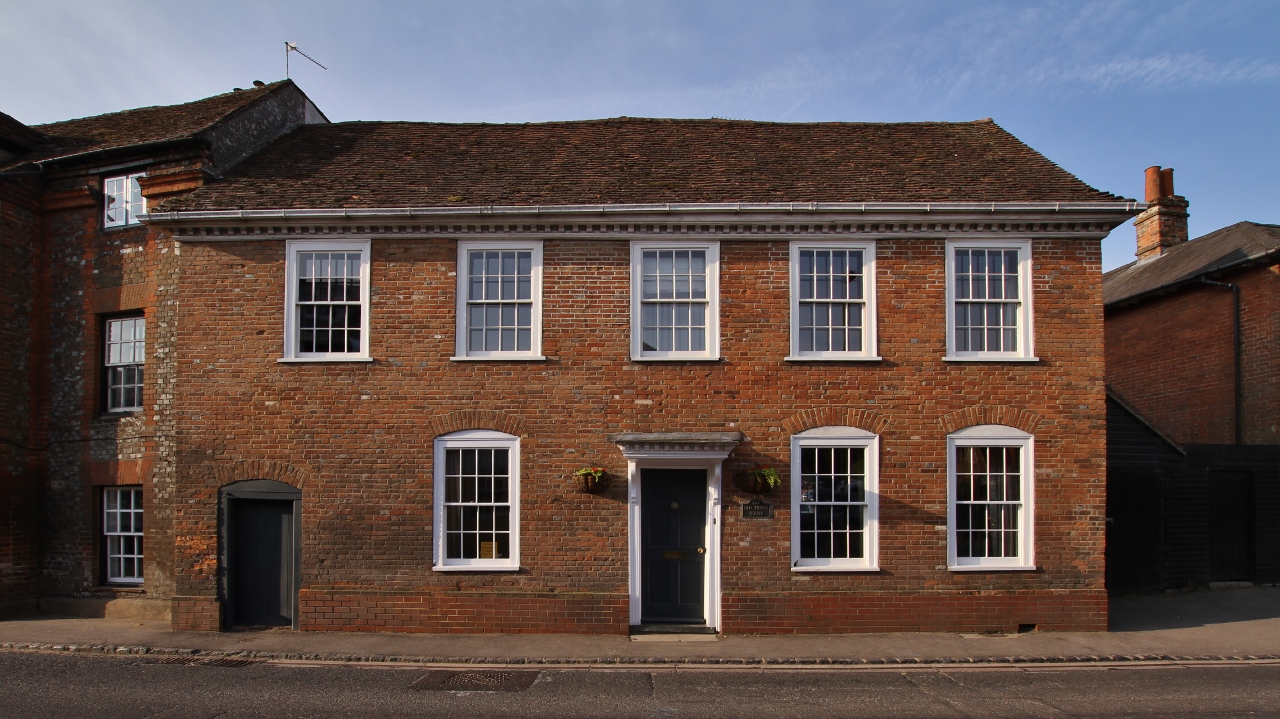
25 High Street. The façade is 18th-century but the house is probably 16th-century.

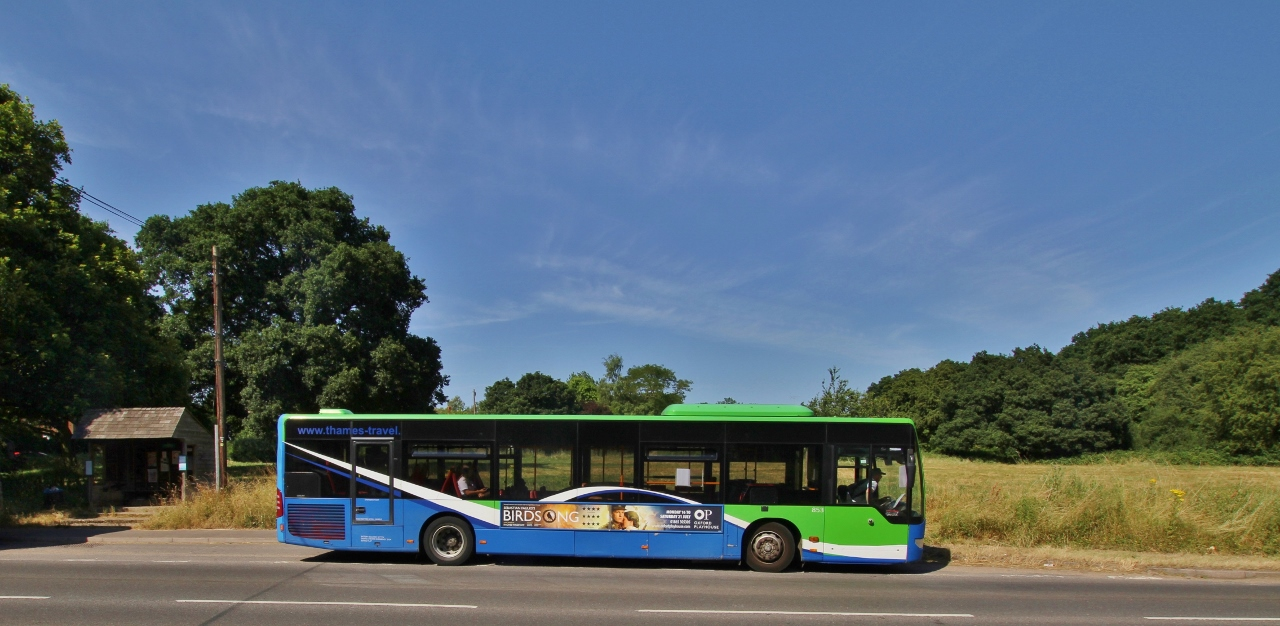
A Thames Travel bus on route X38 on the A4130 road at The Green in Nettlbed

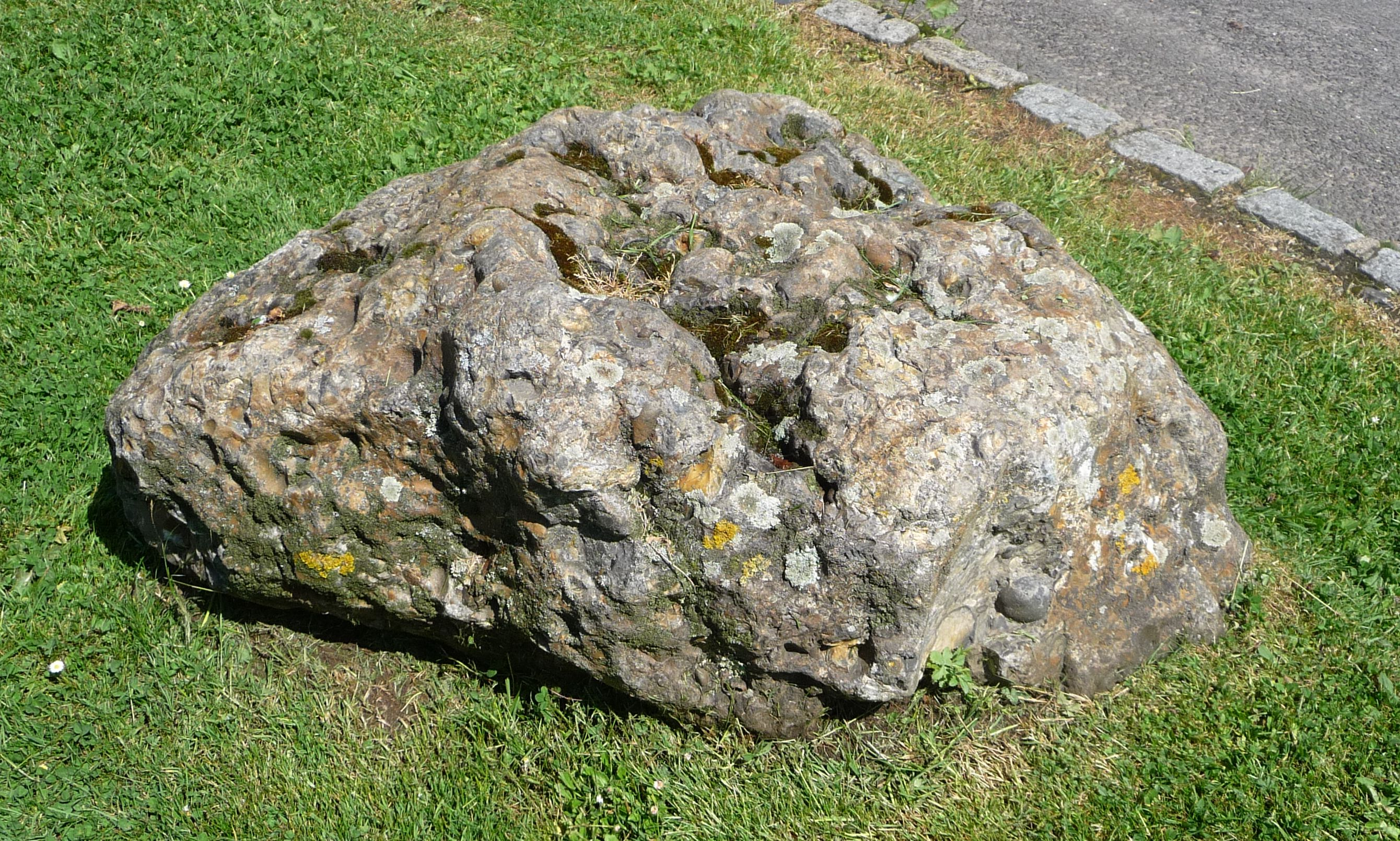
Nettlebed puddingstone

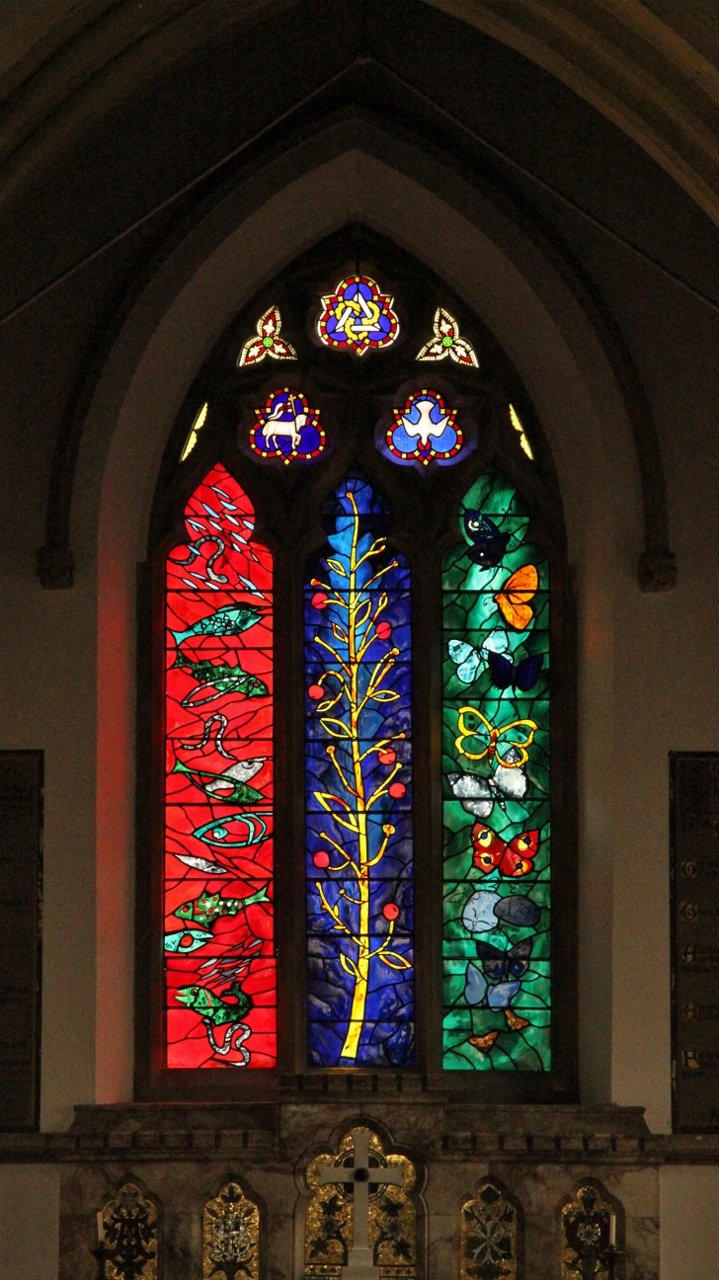
Chancel east window by John Piper and Patrick Reyntiens in St Bartholomew's parish church

== Bibliography ==
- Anonymous (2012). John Piper and the Church a Stained-Glass Tour of Selected Local Churches. Dorchester-on-Thames: Friends of Dorchester Abbey.
- Case, Humphrey (1952–53). "Mesolithic finds in the Oxford area" (PDF). Oxoniensia. XVII–XVIII. Oxford Architectural and Historical Society: 1–13.
- Ekwall, Eilert (1960) [1936]. Concise Oxford Dictionary of English Place-Names (4th ed.). Oxford: Oxford University Press. Nuffield. ISBN 0198691033.
- Foreman, Wilfrid (1983). Oxfordshire Mills. Chichester: Phillimore & Co Ltd. p. 127. ISBN 0-85033-441-1.
- Mellor, Maureen; Cowell, Mike; Newns, Sarah; Vince, Alan (1994). "A Synthesis of Middle and Late Saxon, Medieval and Early Post-medieval Pottery in the Oxford Region" (PDF). Oxoniensia. LIX. Oxfordshire Architectural and Historical Society.
- Page, William, ed. (1907). "The abbey of Dorchester". A History of the County of Oxford. Victoria County History. Vol. 2: Ecclesiastical History, etc. Westminster: Archibald Constable & Co. pp. 87–90.
- Sherwood, Jennifer; Pevsner, Nikolaus (1974). Oxfordshire. The Buildings of England. Harmondsworth: Penguin Books. pp. 714–715. ISBN 0-14-071045-0.
