= Templeux-le-Guérard =

- Commune
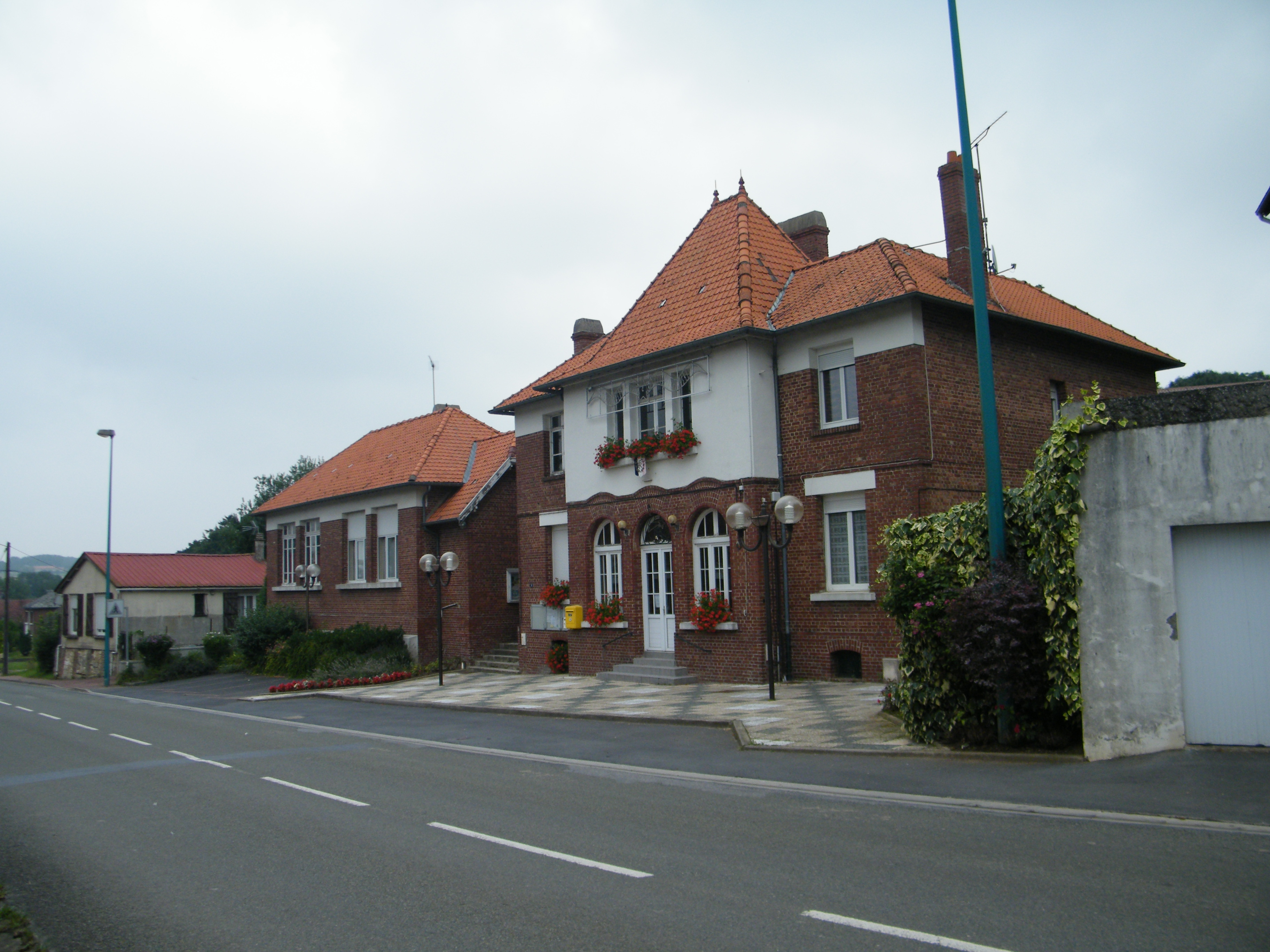
- The town hall and school in Templeux-le-Guérard
- Location of Templeux-le-Guérard
- Location within France Location within Hauts-de-France
- Coordinates: 49°57′50″N 3°08′56″E
- Country: France
- Region: Hauts-de-France
- Department: Somme
- Arrondissement: Péronne
- Canton: Péronne
- Intercommunality: Haute Somme

Government
  - Mayor (2020–2026): Aurore Carré
- Area^{1}: 6.48 km^{2} (2.50 sq mi)
- Elevation: 144 m (472 ft)
- Highest elevation: 145 m (476 ft)
- Lowest elevation: 79 m (259 ft)
- Population (2023): 198
  - Density: 30.6/km^{2} (79.1/sq mi)
- Time zone: UTC+01:00 (CET)
  - Summer (DST): UTC+02:00 (CEST)
- INSEE/Postal code: 80748 /80240
- ^{1} French Land Register data, which excludes lakes, ponds, glaciers > 1 km^{2} (0.386 sq mi or 247 acres) and river estuaries.

Templeux-le-Guérard (French pronunciation: [tɑ̃plø lə ɡeʁaʁ]; Picard: Timplu-l'Gra) is a commune in the Somme department in Hauts-de-France in northern France.

== Geography ==
The commune is situated 30 miles (48 km) east of Amiens, on the D6 road

== Population ==
Historical population
Year	Pop.	±% p.a.
1968	243	—
1975	225	−1.09%
1982	207	−1.18%
1990	216	+0.53%
1999	211	−0.26%
2007	191	−1.24%
2012	208	+1.72%
2017	172	−3.73%
2023	198	+2.37%
Source: INSEE

== See also ==
- Communes of the Somme department
