= Roddie Fleming =

British merchant banker (born 1953)

- Born: Roderick John Fleming; 1953 (age 72–73)
- Education: Eton College; Oxford University
- Occupation: Banker
- Spouse: Diana Wake (m. 1979)
- Children: 2
- Relatives: Valentine Fleming (grandfather); Ian Fleming (uncle); Adam Fleming (brother)

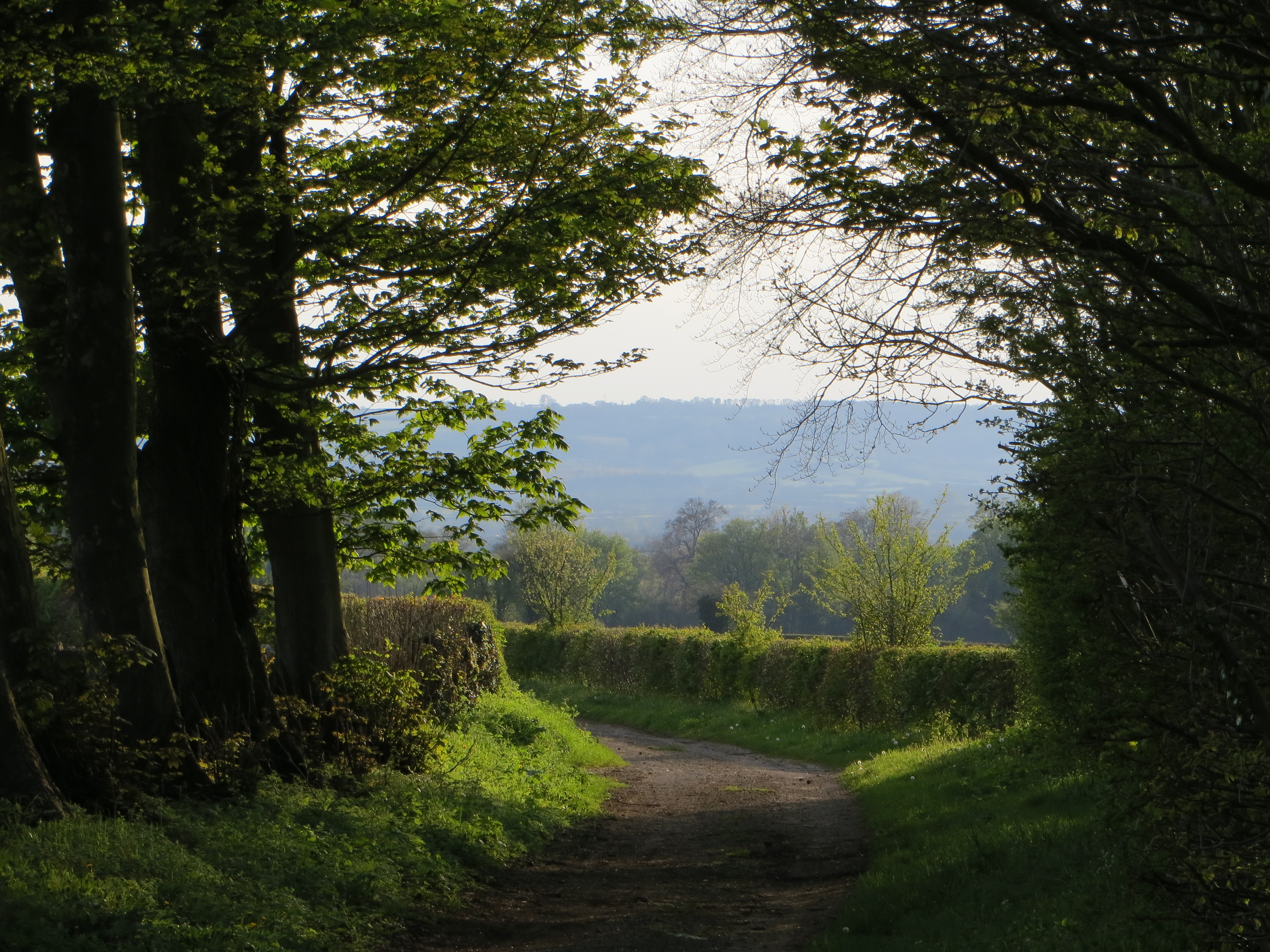
Sarsgrove Wood, which forms part of the family estate, 2012

Roderick John Fleming (born 1953) is a British merchant banker and private wealth manager, and the founder of Fleming Family & Partners.

== Early life ==
Roddie Fleming is the son of Major Richard Evelyn Fleming, and grandson of Valentine Fleming. His uncle was Ian Fleming, author of the James Bond novels. His older brother is Adam Fleming. He was educated at Eton and Oxford University. Fleming was a member of the Bullingdon club during his time at Oxford.

== Career ==
A fourth-generation member of the family, he had been expected to become chairman of Robert Fleming & Co., an asset merchant bank and asset manager, in 2000, but the business was sold to Chase Manhattan Bank for £4.4 billion (then US$7.7 billion). In July 2005, The Times wrote "The £4.4bn price tag seemed full at the time. It seems even more generous now".

About 130 family members received over £1.3 billion for their 30% holding, and this money was largely invested through the privately owned family office Fleming Family & Partners (FF&P) which Fleming founded that year. In 2007, he was its largest shareholder.

In 2003, his net worth was estimated at £1.05 billion. In 2008, The Sunday Times estimated his family's net worth at £1.9 billion.

In 2012, "hard-hit" investments in mining and finance led Fleming to put up for sale two farms bordering his Sarsgrove estate near Chipping Norton, totalling 700 acres and valued in excess of £4 million.

== Personal life ==
In 1979, Fleming married Diana Wake, daughter of Sir Hereward Wake, 14th Baronet. They have twin daughters Hermione "Hum" and Chloe Fleming.

The family home is the grade II* listed Dower House, Sarsgrove Wood, Churchill, Oxfordshire.
