= Eric Becker =

American businessperson

- Born: Eric Becker; United States
- Education: University of Chicago
- Occupations: Businessperson, investor, philanthropist
- Years active: 1980s–present
- Employer: Cresset
- Notable work: The Long Game: A Playbook of the World's Most Enduring Companies
- Title: Co-founder and Co-chairman, Cresset
- Board member of: Positive Coaching Alliance
- Children: 3 (including Cara Becker)
- Website: CressetCapital.com

Eric Becker is an American businessperson and co-founder of multi-family office Cresset. Prior to Cresset, he co-founded the investment firms Sterling Partners and Caretta Group.

== Biography ==
Becker worked as an intern at Levy Restaurants while a student at the University of Chicago. He started as a secret shopper, with the position evolving into business plan writing and doing financial analyses. Just prior to graduation, Becker co-founded LifeCard, a company that digitized medical records. That technology was developed with the assistance of Blue Cross Blue Shield of Maryland. He later co-founded Sterling Partners, an investment management platform.

Sterling Partners was co-founded by Becker in 1983. He retired as a general partners in the firm in 2015 to pursue two ventures. The first is Launch Chapel Hill, a venture lab at the University of North Carolina at Chapel Hill. The other is the Karma for Cara Foundation which was founded in honor of his daughter and provides micro-grants for local community service projects. Becker also founded a series of companies in 2015, including the private investment firm Caretta Group and the real estate investment firm Vennpoint.

In 2017, Becker co-founded Cresset, a multi-family office and private investment firm. The firm manages $235 billion in assets as of 2025.

Outside of Cresset, Becker has served on the board of numerous non-profit organizations, including Positive Coaching Alliance. In 2025, he authored The Long Game: A Playbook of the World's Most Enduring Companies which was a USA Today bestseller.
