= Private banking =

Special banking for wealthy individuals

Private banking is a general description for banking, investment and other financial services provided by banks and financial institutions primarily serving high-net-worth individuals (HNWIs) – those with very high income or substantial assets. Private banking is presented by those who provide such services as an exclusive subset of wealth management services, provided to particularly affluent clients. The term "private" refers to customer service rendered on a more personal basis than in mass-market retail banking, usually provided via dedicated bank advisers. It has typically consisted of banking services (deposit taking and payments), discretionary asset management, brokerage, limited tax advisory services and some basic concierge services, typically offered through a gateway provided by a single designated relationship manager.

== History ==
Banking originated in provision of some services of what is now seen as "private" banking. Early Venetian banks provided personal finance for wealthy families. Private banks came to be known as "private" to stand out from the retail banking and savings banks aimed at the new middle class. Traditionally, private banks were linked to families for several generations. They often advised and performed all financial and banking services for these families. Historically, private banking has developed in Europe (see the List of private banks). Some banks in Europe are known for managing the assets of some royal families. The assets of the Princely Family of Liechtenstein are managed by LGT Group (founded in 1920 and originally known as The Liechtenstein Global Trust). The assets of the Dutch royal family are managed by MeesPierson (founded in 1720). The assets of the British royal family are managed by Coutts (founded in 1692).

Historically, private banking has been viewed as a niche that only caters to HNWIs—specifically those with liquidity over $2 million, though it is now possible to open private banking accounts with as little as $250,000 for private investors. An institution's private banking division provides services such as wealth management, savings, inheritance, and tax planning for their clients. For private banking services, clients pay either based on the number of transactions, the annual portfolio performance or a "flat-fee", usually calculated as a yearly percentage of the total investment amount.

"Private" can also allude to bank secrecy and minimizing taxes through careful allocation of assets, or by hiding assets from the taxing authorities. Swiss and certain offshore banks have been criticized for such cooperation with individuals practising tax evasion. Although tax fraud is a criminal offence in Switzerland, tax evasion is only a civil offence, not requiring banks to notify taxing authorities.

In Switzerland, there are many banks providing private banking services. Switzerland has remained neutral since the Congress of Vienna in 1815, including through two World Wars. After World War I, former nobles of the Austro-Hungarian Empire moved their assets to Switzerland for fear of confiscation by new governments. During World War II, many wealthy people, including Jewish families and institutions, moved their assets into Switzerland to protect them from Nazi Germany. However, this transfer of wealth into Switzerland had mixed and controversial results, as beneficiaries had difficulties retrieving their assets after the war. After World War II, in eastern Europe, assets were again moved into Switzerland for fear of confiscation by communist governments.

Today, Switzerland remains the largest offshore center, with about 27% ($2.0 trillion) of global offshore wealth in 2009, according to Boston Consulting Group. Offshore wealth is defined as assets booked in a country where the investor has no legal residence or tax domicile.

In Great Britain, private banks were established in the 17th century, in parallel with the development of sophisticated agriculture, managing the assets of the royal family, nobility and the landed gentry.

The United States has one of the largest private banking systems in the world, in part due to the 3.1 million HNWIs accounting for 28.6% of the global HNWIs population in 2010, according to the co-research of Capgemini and Merrill Lynch. Some American banks that specialize in private banking date back to the 19th century, such as U.S. Trust (founded in 1853) and Northern Trust (founded in 1889).

=== Recent developments in private banking ===
Internationalisation of the economy, technological developments such as the internet and mobile phones ensure that banks have to innovate and look for new markets. For example, the growth of HNWIs is low in traditional private banking markets such as Europe, compared with Asia where the number of millionaires has grown to 3.6 million.

Banks also provide some private banking services at a lower price than traditional private banking. These are called premium banking or priority banking services. They are meant for mass-affluent customers. The accounts do not generate as much revenue as traditional private banking, but given the number of customers, can provide sizeable revenue to the bank.

In 2016, Credit Suisse and UBS replaced the phrase "private banking" with "wealth management"; private banking has faced reputational risk as an area for tax avoidance or even tax evasion.

=== Wealth minimums ===
Private banking services are only accessible to customers with a minimum amount of investible assets. For instance, in 2016, J.P. Morgan began requiring a minimum of $10 million in assets to qualify for private banking, with those with less being moved into their Private Client Direct program. Nevertheless, this seems to be an exception as a majority of banks establish the minimum threshold between $500,000 and $1 million.

Indeed, private banking customers are frequently segmented according to their wealth. HNW are customers with a total worth between €500,000 and €5 million; very high net worth individuals (VHNWI), with assets ranging between €5 million and €30 million; and ultra high net worth individuals (UHNWI), with wealth in excess of €30 million.

== Private banking rankings ==
=== By AUM ===
In terms of Assets under Management (AuM), the world's 15 largest private banks (or private banking divisions/subsidiaries of large bank holding companies), as of 2023, are:

Rank	Bank name	Total AuM (2025) (US$ Billion)
1	(United States) JPMorgan Private Bank	5.1
2	(Switzerland) UBS Global Wealth Management	4,753
3	(United States) Morgan Stanley Wealth Management	2,753
4	(United States) Bank of America Global Wealth Management	2,178
5	(United States) Wells Fargo Wealth & Investment Management	1,127
6	(United States) Goldman Sachs Private Wealth Management	945
7	(United States) Charles Schwab Wealth Management Solutions	827
8	(Canada) RBC Wealth Management	794
9	(United States) Citigroup Wealth	670
10	(Switzerland) Julius Baer Group	627
11	(France) BNP Paribas Wealth Management	584
12	(United States) Northern Trust Wealth Management	507
13	(United Kingdom) HSBC Global Private Banking	465
14	(Italy) Intesa Sanpaolo Private Banking	281
15	(United States) Raymond James Financial	275

== Value proposition ==
Most private banks define their value proposition along one or two dimensions, and meet the basic needs across others. Some of the dimensions of value proposition of a private bank are parent brand, one-bank approach, unbiased advice, strong research and advisory team and unified platform.

Many banks leverage the "parent brand" to gain a client’s trust and confidence. These banks have a strong presence across the globe and present private bank offerings as a part of the parent group. "One Bank approach" is where private banks offer an integrated proposition to meet clients personal and business needs.

Since private banking concerns understanding a client’s need and risk appetite, and tailoring the solution accordingly, few banks define their value proposition along this dimension. Most modern private banks follow an open product platform, and hence claim their advice is unbiased. They believe there is no incentive to push proprietary products, and the client gets the best of what they offer. A few banks claim to have a "strong advisory team" that reflects in the products they offer the client. A couple of banks also define their value proposition on their unified platform, their ability to comply with all regulations, yet serve the client without restrictions.

== Product platform ==
Open architecture platform allows a private bank to distribute third-party products alongside its own proprietary offerings. A closed architecture platform restricts the bank to selling only its own products.

As client needs have grown more varied, many banks have adopted open architecture models, distributing products from other institutions in exchange for commission. Products typically offered to private banking clients include equities, fixed-income securities, structured products, foreign exchange, commodities, deposits, and real estate investments.

== Fee structure ==
Different banks charge their clients in different ways. There are banks that follow the transactional model where the client is not charged any advisory fee at all. The banks thrive totally on the commissions they get by distributing third party products. There are other private banks that follow a hybrid model. In this model, the bank charges a fixed fee for certain products and advisory fee for the rest. Some of the other banks are totally advisory driven and charge the clients a percentage of AUM (e.g. 0.75% of entire AUM). A few banks offer both a transactional model and an advisory model. The clients choose what suits them. A recent industry trend is towards the advisory fee model, because margins on commissions may go down in the future.

== See also ==
- Public bank
- Family office
- Multi-family office
