= Rockefeller Capital Management =

American wealth and asset management company

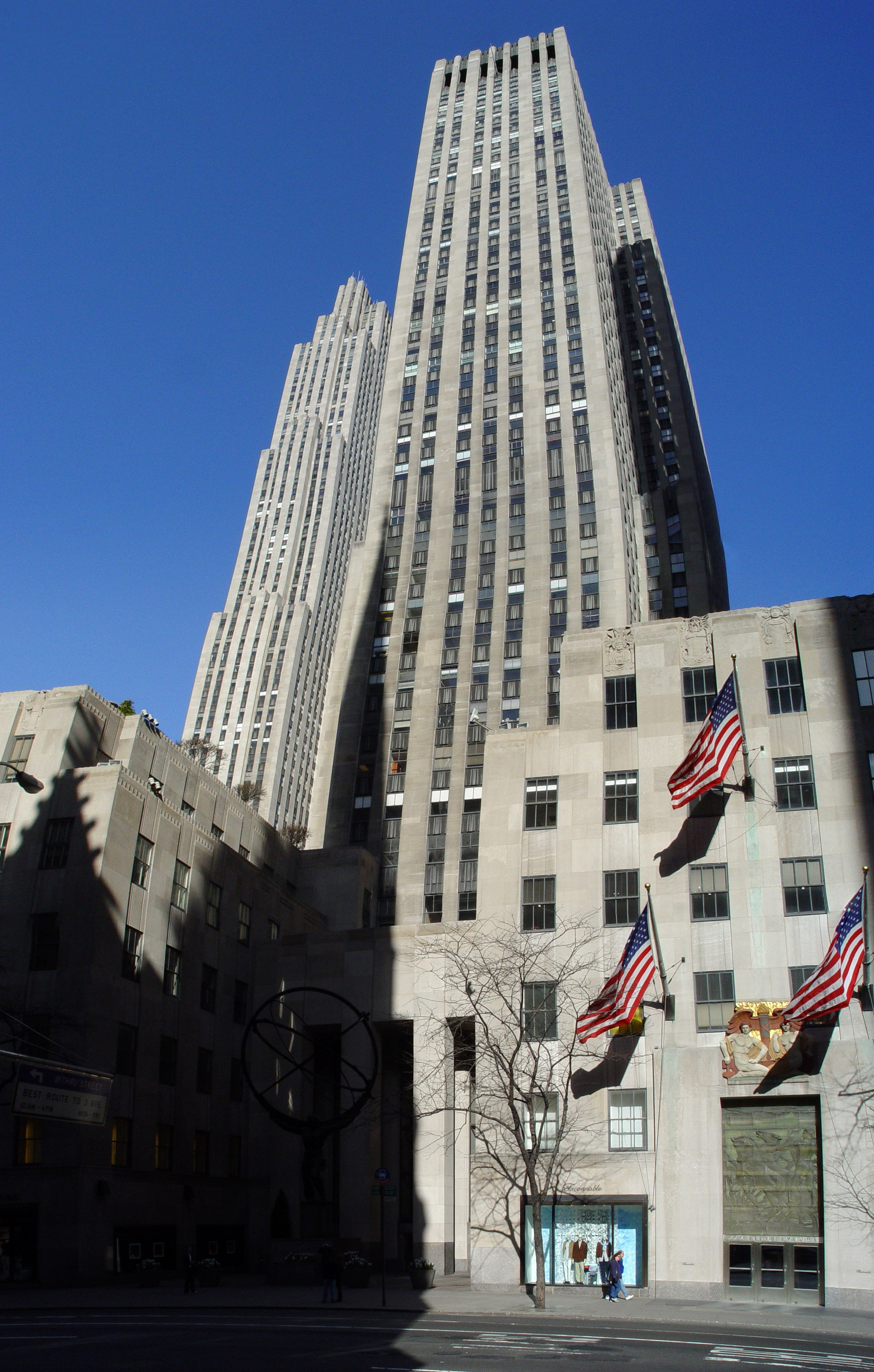
- Headquarters at 45 Rockefeller Plaza
- Type: Private
- Industry: Asset management; Wealth management
- Predecessor: Rockefeller & Co.
- Founded: March 1, 2018; 8 years ago in New York City, U.S.
- Founders: Rockefeller family; Viking Global Investors; Greg Fleming
- Headquarters: 45 Rockefeller Plaza, New York City, U.S.
- Key people: Greg Fleming (CEO)
- Services: Wealth management; Family Office services; Strategic advisory; Asset management
- AUM: $191 billion (2025)
- Owners: Viking Global Investors; Mousse Partners; Progeny 3; Abrams Capital; Rockefeller family; Desmarais Family
- Website: rcm.rockco.com

Rockefeller Capital Management (RCM) is an independent wealth management and financial services firm, founded in 2018. The firm offers family office, asset management, and strategic advisory services to high-net-worth individuals and families, institutions, and corporations. Its president and CEO is Greg Fleming.

The firm is headquartered in Rockefeller Plaza in New York City. It has over 40 offices in the US, where it is active in 31 markets, and also operates an office in London.

== Company history ==
In October 2017, Rockefeller Financial Services, the parent company of Rockefeller & Co., announced the imminent creation of Rockefeller Capital Management, and the appointment of former Wall Street executive Greg Fleming as its founding CEO. The new firm resulted from the acquisition by Viking Global Investors of a majority stake in Rockefeller & Co., a wealth-management multi-family office and registered investment adviser firm set up by the Rockefeller family in 1979. The original firm was established by John D. Rockefeller in 1882 as the first full-service single family office in the United States, according to Deloitte, and according to the Financial Times, as "one of the world's first family offices dedicated to investing [personal] wealth." Rockefeller & Co. changed its business name to Rockefeller Financial in 2010.

Rockefeller Capital Management began operations in March 2018. Fleming began aggressively recruiting staff from the major Wall Street full-service brokerage firms. He also made acquisitions, and opened branch offices in cities across the United States, with locations in 14 states by 2021. In 2022 the firm had over 40 offices in the United States and an office in London. As of 2022, the firm was responsible for over $90 billion in client assets across its three business divisions – Rockefeller Global Family Office, Rockefeller Asset Management and Rockefeller Global Investment Banking.

In the fall of 2019, the firm acquired Financial Clarity, a multi-family office wealth-management firm in Silicon Valley. In early 2021, it acquired Whitnell & Co., a similar firm in the Chicago area, from Associated Banc-Corp. In 2022, the firm acquired the wealth management business Spearhead Capital, a financial services firm based in Florida.

In April 2023, the firm received a $622 million investment from the Canadian investment manager IGM Financial, a subsidiary of Power Corporation of Canada, which is controlled by the Desmarais family, who have long-standing relationships with the company and the Rockefeller family. In January 2025, the firm's assets under management were reported as $151 billion, then as $191 billion that October.

== Services ==
Rockefeller Global Family Office
Rockefeller Global Family Office is a division offering a variety of financial services, including wealth management, family office services, trust and fiduciary services, and wealth and strategy advising.

Rockefeller Global Investment Banking
Rockefeller Global Investment Banking provides strategic advice to high-net-worth families, family offices, individuals, and corporations on matters such as mergers, acquisitions, divestitures, real estate, raising capital, and sports franchises.

Rockefeller Asset Management
Rockefeller Asset Management is the firm's asset management division. According to CityWire, the division provides "equity and fixed income strategies across active, multi-factor passive, and thematic approaches."

In March 2018, Rockefeller Asset Management joined the United Nations Environment Programme Finance Initiative, stating its intent to build a concentrated long-term portfolio emphasizing environmental, social, and governance (ESG) factors. In May 2019 it launched two ESG-driven investment funds: the Rockefeller US ESG Equity Fund; and the Rockefeller Global ESG Equity Fund, a UCITS fund domiciled in Europe. In January 2021 Rockefeller Asset Management, in partnership with Bloomberg, launched the Bloomberg Rockefeller U.S. All Cap Multi-Factor ESG Improvers Index, which ranks a company's improvement on ESG issues relative to industry peers, while also taking quality and low volatility into account, in addition to incorporating shareholder engagement techniques.

== Governance ==
Former Wall Street senior executive Greg Fleming is the founding president and CEO of the company.

The private-equity arm of Viking Global Investors, owns a stake in the company, and Viking portfolio manager Brian Kaufmann is on the Rockefeller Capital Management board. Rockefeller family members also own a minority stake in the company. In April 2023, the Desmarais family acquired a 20.5% stake in RCM through their financial services conglomerate Power Corporation of Canada. Desmarais associates Andre Desmarais, deputy chairman of Power Corporation of Canada, and James O’Sullivan, president of subsidiary IGM Financial, joined the RCM board as part of the transaction.

In October 2025, an investor group led by Mousse Partners, Progeny 3, and Abrams Capital resulted in a new company valuation of $6.6 billion.
