= Adam Fleming (businessman) =

British billionaire

- Born: Adam Richard Fleming; 15 May 1948 (age 78)
- Education: Eton College

Adam Richard Fleming (born 15 May 1948) is a British businessman and was the deputy group chairman of the asset management company Stonehage Fleming before his retirement in 2019.

== Early life ==
Adam Richard Fleming was born on 15 May 1948, the son of Major Richard Evelyn Fleming (1910–1977) and the Hon. Dorothy Charmian Hermon-Hodge, daughter of Roland Herman Hermon-Hodge, 2nd Baron Wyfold. He has seven brothers and sisters.

His grandfather was Major Valentine Fleming (1882–1917), and his great-grandfather was the Scottish banker Robert Fleming, founder of the merchant bank Robert Fleming & Co. His uncle on his father's side was the James Bond novelist Ian Fleming.

He was educated at Abberley Hall School and Eton.

== Career ==
He started his career in 1970 as a stock market analyst at Robert Fleming & Co., the company founded by his great-grandfather, earning £7 per week.

Fleming is chairman of Wits Gold, chairman of the Johannesburg Land Company, a director of Zambeef Products, chairman of Fleming Family & Partners, and has farming interests in Zambia and South Africa.

Fleming describes himself as "just a long-term investor with firm beliefs in gold".

The 2024 Sunday Times Rich List estimated his family's net worth at £1.6 billion.

== Personal life ==
He is married to Caroline Wake. They live on a farm in the Cotswolds and have four children. His son Hector Fleming is a former director of Standard Chartered's private equity team, co-founded the investment company Fleming Wulfsohn Africa, and is a director of Imara, The Johannesburg Land Company, Clover Alloys, GoldMoney Networks and Netagio Holdings.

He is a member of White's, London, and the Rand Club of Johannesburg.
