= White's =

Gentlemen's club in London, England

Coordinates: 51°30′27.3″N 0°8′24″W

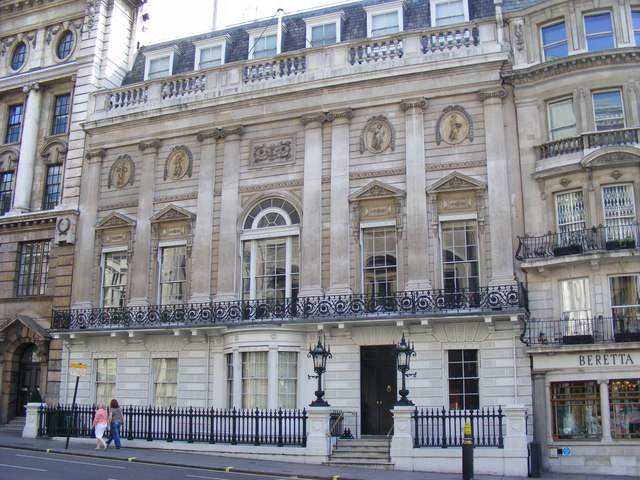
- White's club
- Formation: 1693
- Type: Gentlemen's club
- Location: 37–38 St James's Street, London, SW1

White's is a gentlemen's club in St James's, London. Founded in 1693 as a hot chocolate shop in Mayfair, it is London's oldest club and therefore the oldest private members' club in the world. It moved to its current premises on St James's Street in 1778.

== Status ==
White's is the oldest gentlemen's club in London, founded in 1693, and is considered by many to be the most exclusive private club in London. Notable current members include Charles III and William, Prince of Wales. Former British prime minister David Cameron, whose father Ian Cameron was the club's chairman, was a member for fifteen years but resigned in 2008, over the club's declining to admit women.

White's is a member of the Association of London Clubs. In January 2018, calling themselves 'Women in Whites', a group of female protesters infiltrated the club to highlight its single-sex policy, one managing to gain entry by pretending to be a man.

== History ==
The club was originally established at 4 Chesterfield Street, off Curzon Street in Mayfair, in 1693 by an Italian immigrant named Francesco Bianco as a hot chocolate emporium under the name Mrs. White's Chocolate House. Tickets were sold to the productions at King's Theatre and Royal Drury Lane Theatre as a side-business. White's quickly made the transition from teashop to exclusive club and in the early 18th century, it was notorious as a gambling house; those who frequented it were known as "the gamesters of White's". The club gained a reputation for both its exclusivity and the often raffish behaviour of its members. Jonathan Swift referred to White's as the "bane of half the English nobility."

In 1778 it moved to 37–38 St James's Street. From 1783 it was the unofficial headquarters of the Tory party, while the Whigs' club Brooks's was just down the road. A few apolitical and affable gentlemen managed to belong to both. The new architecture featured a bow window on the ground floor. In the later 18th century, the table directly in front of it became a seat of distinction, the throne of the most socially influential men in the club. This belonged to the arbiter elegantiarum, Beau Brummell, until he removed to the Continent in 1816, when William Arden, 2nd Baron Alvanley, took the place of honour. While there, he is supposed to have once bet £3,000 on which of two raindrops would first reach the bottom of a pane in the bow window. Later, the spot was reserved for the use of Arthur Wellesley, 1st Duke of Wellington, until his death in 1852.

Alvanley's was not the most eccentric bet in White's famous betting book. Some of those entries were on sports, but more often on political developments, especially during the chaotic years of the French Revolution and the Napoleonic Wars. A good many were social bets, such as whether a friend would marry this year, or to whom.

The club continues to maintain its tradition as a club for gentlemen only, although one of its best known chefs from the early 1900s was Rosa Lewis, a model for the central character in the BBC television series The Duchess of Duke Street.

There were two American members in the interwar period, one of whom was a general in the U.S. Army. Postwar American members included diplomat Edward Streator.

King Charles III held his stag night at the club before his wedding to Diana Spencer in July 1981.

== Clubhouse ==
The clubhouse is located at 37–38 St James's Street in the City of Westminster and is a Grade I listed building. The current facade of the building was designed in 1852 by James Lockyer.

== Notable members ==
- George Canning (1770–1827)
- Norman Lamont, Baron Lamont of Lerwick
- Adam Fleming
- Major General Sir Stewart Menzies (1890–1968)
- Nicholas Elliott (1916–1994)
- Prince Philip, Duke of Edinburgh (1921–2021)
- Charles III
- William, Prince of Wales
- Arthur Wellesley, 1st Duke of Wellington (1769–1852)

== See also ==
- List of members' clubs in London
- List of gentlemen's clubs in the United States
