= Whittier Trust Company =

American independent wealth management and investment firm

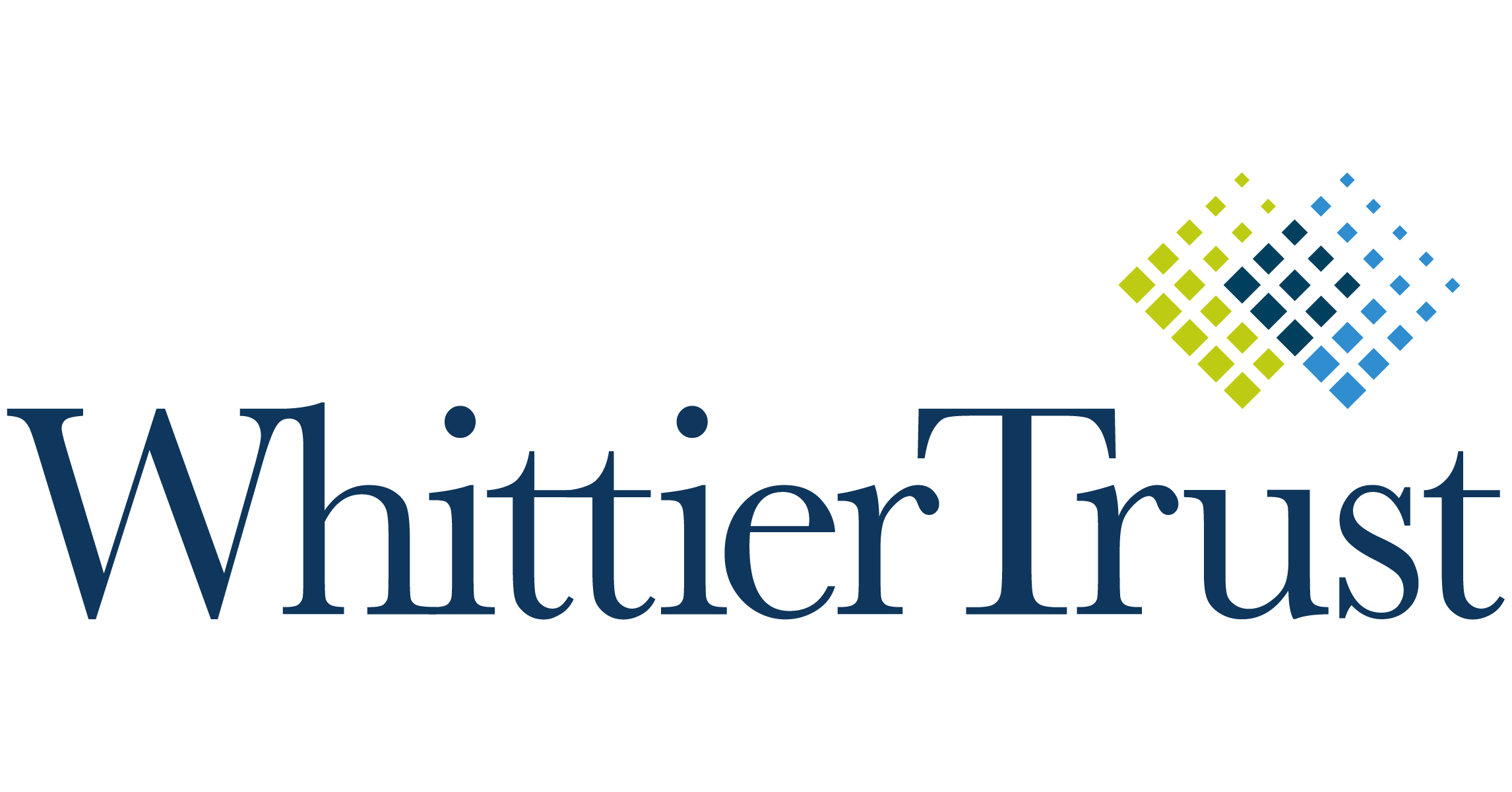
- Type: Private
- Industry: Financial services
- Founded: 1989; 37 years ago (Whittier Trust Company); 1994; 32 years ago (Whittier Trust Company of Nevada, Inc.)
- Headquarters: Pasadena, California and Reno, Nevada, U.S.
- Key people: Michael J. Casey (Executive chairman); David A. Dahl (CEO)
- Services: Investments; Trust services Philanthropy
- Total assets: US $20 billion
- Website: www.whittiertrust.com

Whittier Trust Company is an American independent wealth management and investment firm. A multi-family office, it stems from the family office founded by the children of Max Whittier. Whittier co-founded and developed Beverly Hills in the early 1900s, and co-founded Belridge Oil in 1911.

== History ==
The Whittier family office was one of the first family offices in the United States. It was established in 1935 by Leland, Don, Helen, and Paul Whittier to manage their assets and later their philanthropic efforts. A significant percentage of the Whittier family's fortune was on paper until 1979, when Belridge Oil was sold to Shell Oil for $3.6 billion. It was the largest corporate acquisition in history at the time.

In 1989, Whittier Trust Company was created as a California state-chartered trust company, and began to offer investment, wealth management, fiduciary, family office, and philanthropic services to other families. In 1994, an affiliate company, The Whittier Trust Company of Nevada, Inc. was formed in Reno, Nevada to take advantage of the state's favorable tax and trust laws. As of 2023, Whittier Trust managed assets of more than $20 bn. for more than 140 foundations, donor advised funds, endowments, and 161 charitable entities, and 578 ultra high-net-worth families.

Whittier Trust is headquartered on the West Coast, with offices in Pasadena, Newport Beach, West Los Angeles, San Francisco, and Menlo Park, California; Reno, Nevada; Seattle, Washington; and Portland Oregon. In a nod to the Whittier family history, it maintains a focus on philanthropy, and remains actively involved in oil, gas, and real estate investments.

In 2013, the Securities and Exchange Commission charged Whittier Trust and a fund manager employed by the firm with participating in an insider trading scheme where they benefited by placing trades using confidential, non-public information about technology companies. Later that year, Whittier Trust agreed to pay $1.7 million in damages to settle the insider trader charges.
