= The Dower House, Sarsgrove Wood =

House in Sarsden, Oxfordshire, England

Coordinates: 51.9171°N 1.5571°W

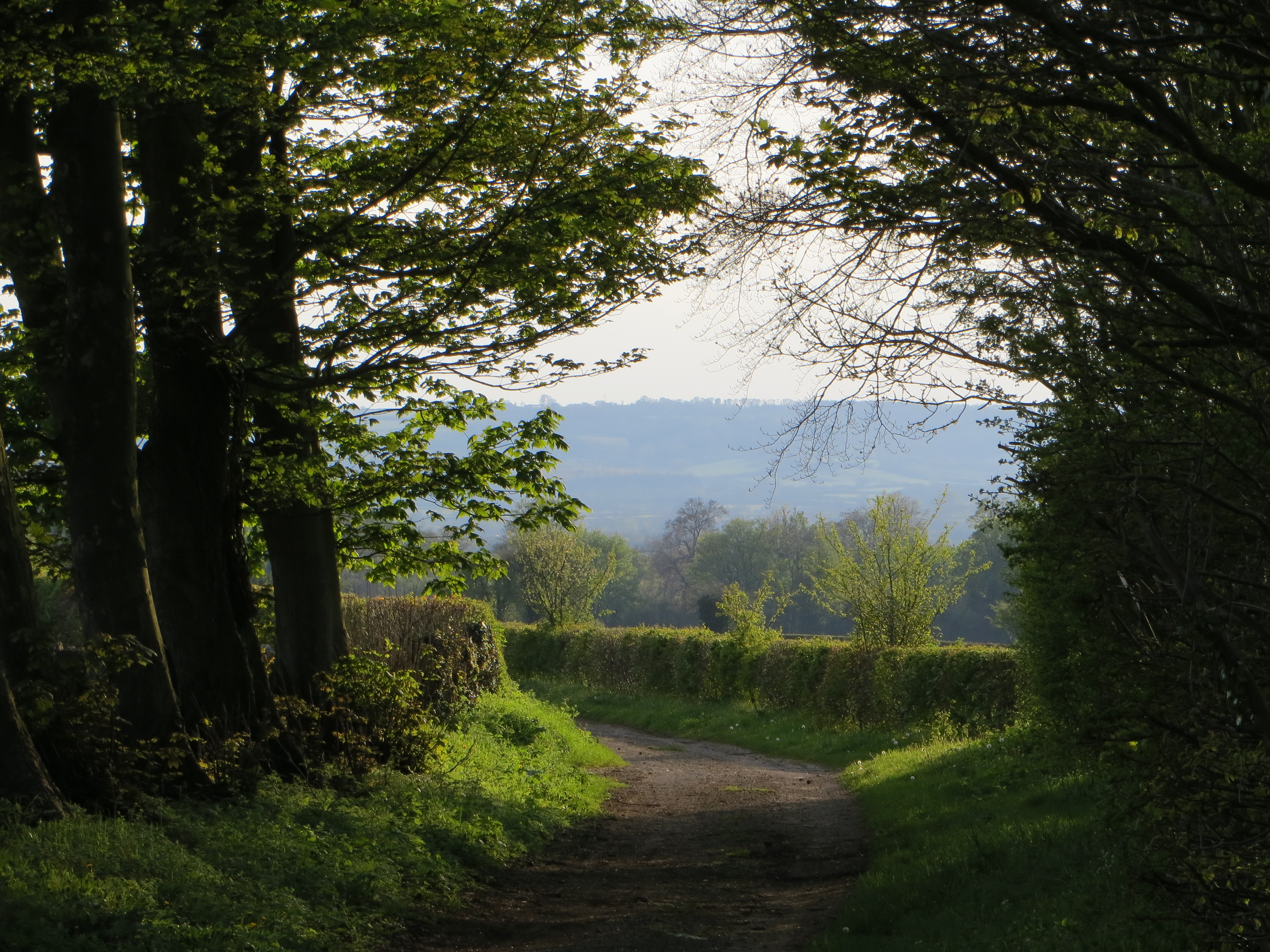
Sarsgrove Wood, which forms part of the estate, 2012

The Dower House, Sarsgrove Wood is a Grade II* listed house in Sarsgrove Wood, Churchill, Oxfordshire, England (near Chipping Norton).

The house has been Grade II* listed since 1985.

It is home to merchant banker Roddie Fleming and his family.
