= Jardine Fleming =

Hong Kong-based investment bank

Jardine Fleming was a Hong Kong–based investment bank founded in 1970 as a joint venture between Jardine Matheson and Robert Fleming & Co. It was acquired by JP Morgan Chase in 2000.
