= Cresset (multi-family office) =

Private investment firm

- Founders: Eric Becker; Avy Stein
- Headquarters: Chicago, Illinois
- Key people: Susie Cranston, CEO; Eric Becker, Co-Chairman; Avy Stein, Co-Chairman; Michael Costabile, CFO
- Website: Official website

Cresset is a multi-family office and private investment firm. Founded in 2017, it provides wealth management services to high-net-worth clients. As of 2025, it manages approximately $235 billion in assets under management and advisement.

== History ==
Cresset was founded in 2017 by entrepreneurs Eric Becker and Avy Stein. They formed the office after being dissatisfied clients of other wealth management firms where there was lack of comprehensive services. In 2020, it acquired PagnatoKarp, a $2.3 billion RIA.

Although originally formed to manage the assets of family members, Cresset grew to 1,100 clients by 2021. The same year, it completed its first merger by absorbing the $4.7 billion in managed assets of Berman Capital Advisors. The following year in 2022, it merged with Meristem Family Wealth. At the conclusion of the merger, Cresset had more than $27 billion in managed assets. In 2024, Cresset purchased the Dallas, Texas-based CH Investment Partners which managed $6.2 billion in assets as of the date of acquisition.

== Clients and services ==
Cresset manages both public and private investments for high-net-worth clients. It also does estate and tax planning for its clients. As of 2025, it manages $235 billion in assets under management and advisement.
