= Rosa Lewis =

English cook

Photograph of Rosa Lewis taken at the end of the Edwardian period

Rosa Lewis (née Ovenden; 1867–1952) was an English cook and owner of The Cavendish Hotel in London, located at the intersection of Jermyn Street and Duke Street, St. James. Known as the "Queen of Cooks", her culinary skills were highly prized by Edward VII, with whom she was rumoured to have had an affair in the 1890s. She was also called "The Duchess of Jermyn Street."

== Life ==
She was born in Leyton, Essex, the fifth of nine children. Her father was a watchmaker and later an undertaker.

She left school at 12 to go into domestic service, working her way up to cook. She claimed that the great chef Auguste Escoffier, then at the Carlton Hotel, taught her about cooking. It was he who named her the "Queen of Cooks". One of her employers was Lady Randolph Churchill. One day, Rosa chased Lady Randolph's then ten-year-old, red-haired son Winston out of her kitchen, shouting "Hop it, copper knob."

She married butler Chiney Lewis in 1893. However, she did not think much of her husband. "My family said that if I did not marry Mr. Lewis they would shoot me. ... So we were married and I threw the ring at him at the church door and left him flat."

There are several versions describing how she met Edward VII. According to Time magazine, it was Lady Randolph who introduced them. However, the Cavendish Hotel biography states they first met while she was employed by Philippe, Comte de Paris; he complimented her for the excellence of the dinner. In any case, he enjoyed her cooking very much. It was suspected by some that he helped her purchase the Cavendish Hotel in 1902. Another admirer of her culinary skills was Kaiser Wilhelm II, who presented her with his portrait. During World War I, she had it hung upside down in the men's toilet.

In 1914 it was reported that she "cooked dinners for the regiments of the Household Cavalry... and at one time controlled the kitchen of White's Club", the latter a reference to White's "the oldest and most exclusive gentleman's club in London".

Richard Hillary knew her during World War II, and wrote in The Last Enemy:

One night when we were in town we walked around to see Rosa Lewis at The Cavendish Hotel. Suddenly caught by a stroke, she had been rushed to the London Clinic, where she refused to allow any of the nurses to touch her. After a week she saw the bill and immediately got up and left.

When we arrived, there she was, seventy-six years old, shrieking with laughter and waving a glass of champagne, apparently none the worse. She grabbed me by the arm and peered into my face. "God, aren't you dead yet either, young Hillary? Come here and I'll tell you something. Don't you ever die. In the last two weeks I've been right up to the gates of 'eaven and 'ell and they're both bloody!"
A few weeks later a heavy bomb landed right on the Cavendish, but Rosa emerged triumphant, pulling bits of glass out of her hair and trumpeting with rage. Whatever else may go in this war, we shall still have Rosa Lewis and the Albert Memorial at the end.

Lewis died in her sleep on 8 November 1952 at the age of 85.

Author Daphne Fielding wrote The Duchess of Jermyn Street (1964) about Rosa Lewis's life, but was not formally credited in the BBC production.

== In fiction ==
The 1976-77 BBC television series, The Duchess of Duke Street, starring Gemma Jones, was loosely based on her life. It is said that some of the scenes in Vile Bodies by Evelyn Waugh, in which she appears as her fictional counterpart Lottie Crump, were also inspired by the Cavendish Hotel under Lewis' management.

== Plaque ==
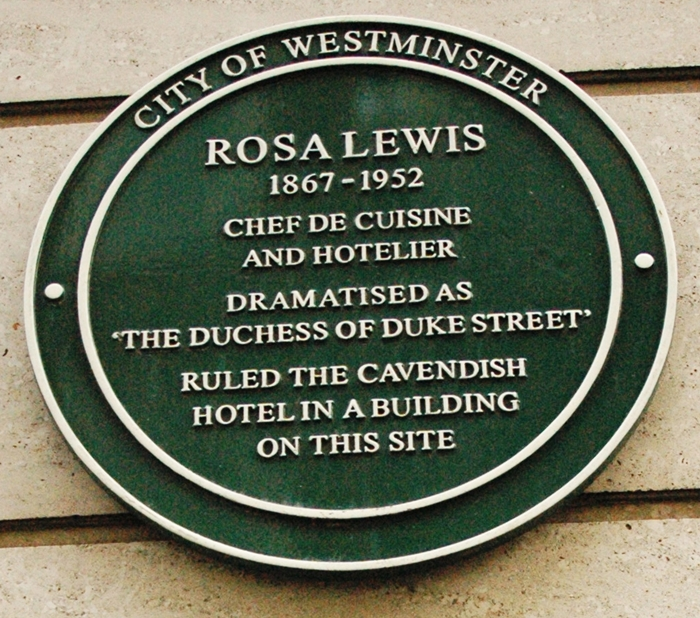

On 16 November 2006, Gemma Jones unveiled Westminster City Council's Commemorative Green plaque to Lewis, near the entrance to the old hotel in Jermyn Street. The plaque was the 68th in the Scheme. It honoured Lewis as a Chef de Cuisine and Hotelier.
