= The Cavendish Hotel =

Hotel in London, United Kingdom

The Cavendish London
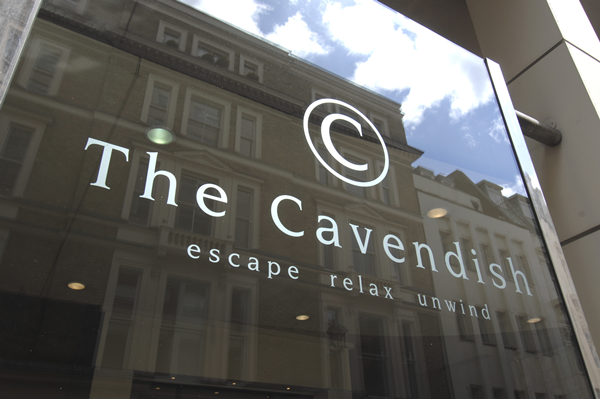
- Hotel entrance on Duke Street

- Location within Central London

General information
- Location: 81 Jermyn Street, St James's, London, SW1Y 6JF, United Kingdom
- Coordinates: 51°30′28″N 0°08′16″W
- Operator: The Ascott

Technical details
- Floor count: 15

Other information
- Number of rooms: 230
- Number of suites: 6
- Number of restaurants: 1
- Number of bars: 1

Website
- www.thecavendish-london.co.uk

The Cavendish Hotel is a modern 230-room 4-star luxury hotel in the St James's district of the City of Westminster borough of London, United Kingdom. It is currently known as "The Cavendish London" and is owned by CapitaLand. It is located at the corner of Jermyn Street (main entrance) and Duke Street, St James's (side entrance). Jermyn Street is an established retail and urban leisure street which has bespoke gentlemen's clothing stores, shoe/bootmakers, and barber shops.

The hotel gained prominence during the 1902–1952 management of the self-made hotelier and socialite Rosa Lewis, who was also known as the "Queen of Cooks" and "The Duchess of Jermyn Street"; damaged in the London Blitz, it was torn down in 1962. The present edition of the hotel was built on the site in 1966.

== Green credentials ==
The Cavendish London was the first hotel in London to receive Gold Grading in the Green Tourism for London Scheme and is a rare hotel in London to feature carbon-neutral meeting rooms.

The Cavendish London has been owned and managed by Ascott, since its acquisition in the 4th quarter of 2012.

== Interior ==
The hotel features a contemporary style of decoration throughout and the public areas. With 15 floors, the building is substantially higher than most buildings in the area, and the rooms in the higher floors enjoy fine views of the London skyline.

== History ==
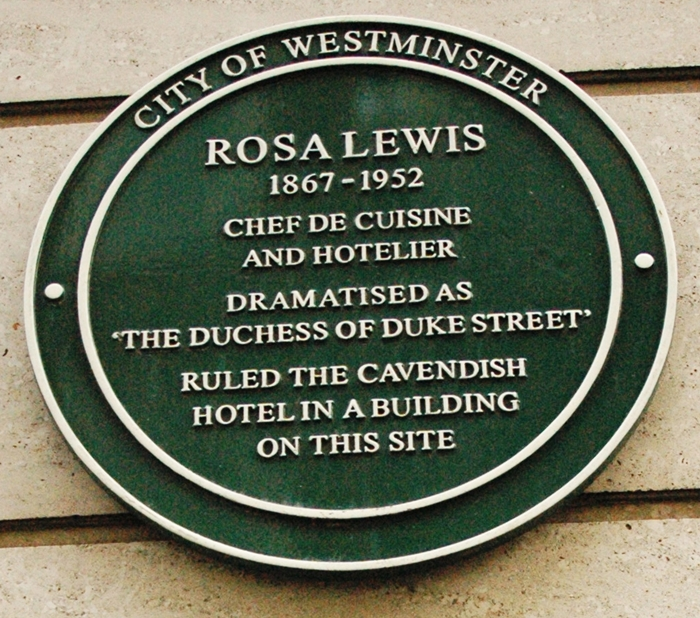
Plaque in commemoration of Rosa Lewis's services in the site of The Cavendish Hotel

There is reference of a hotel operating in the site under the name of "Miller's Hotel" from the early 1800s. However, the hotel was renamed "The Cavendish" in 1836. In 1902, Rosa Lewis bought The Cavendish and put her husband Excelsior Tyrel Chiney Lewis and his sister Laura in charge. By 1904, though, the hotel was not going very well: debts spiralled out of control and Excelsior was having a drinking problem; therefore, Rosa decided to divorce him and throw him and Laura out.

Once divorced, Rosa took charge of the hotel and expanded it greatly. The reform meant turning four buildings into one and by then, the hotel had over one hundred rooms. During those times, Rosa Lewis cooked regularly for major figures of the times, who were delighted by her cooking and her hospitality. Some of them were King Edward VII, Lord Northcliffe, Lord Kitchener, and the Duke of Windsor.

During World War I, Rosa Lewis decided to turn The Cavendish into a "social first aid centre" for servicemen, which she did again for World War II. On 15 May 1941, the hotel was badly damaged by a German air raid. Rosa was in the building at the time, but she was not injured.

Despite the bombing, the hotel carried on. In 1944, Rosa Lewis became ill and had to go to a nursing home, leaving her friend Edith Jeffrey in charge of the hotel, which was already showing some signs of decline. She eventually returned to the hotel where Edith took care of her, until she died on 28 November 1952, at the age of 85.

For another ten years, Edith Jeffrey continued to run the hotel, then in a state of decline, until her own death. In June 1962, the old Cavendish Hotel finally closed its doors. The decision to demolish the old hotel completely was seen as a deeply upsetting act of vandalism by those who had loved it.

The new Cavendish Hotel, completely re-built and bearing no relation at all to its magnificent predecessor, opened its doors in July 1966. Writing of Rosa Lewis in one of his memoirs, Alistair McAlpine noted: "In the 1960s, my family rebuilt her hotel in Jermyn Street."

The 1970s BBC series The Duchess of Duke Street was a fictional adaptation with elements taken from the hotel, Rosa Lewis and her husband's story.
