= Greg Fleming (businessman) =

American business executive and investment banker

- Born: Gregory James Fleming; February 27, 1963 (age 63)
- Education: Colgate University (BA); Yale University (JD)
- Occupations: Businessperson, investment banker, professor
- Years active: 1988–present
- Employer: Rockefeller Capital Management (CEO)
- Board member of: BlackRock
- Website: Biography at Rockefeller Capital Mgmt

Gregory James Fleming (born February 27, 1963) is an American business executive and investment banker. Currently, the CEO of Rockefeller Capital Management, Fleming is also a lecturer at Yale Law School in ethics and financial markets. He previously served as president and chief operating officer at Merrill Lynch, where he led several major mergers and acquisitions deals in the 2000s, including the $50 billion sale of Merrill Lynch to Bank of America. In 2010, he became president of Morgan Stanley Investment Management, then became president of Morgan Stanley Smith Barney in 2011. He was named the founding president and CEO of Rockefeller Capital in 2017, and is a member of the trustee advisory board at Millennium Management, LLC, and of the board of directors of BlackRock.

== Early life and education ==
Born on 27 February 1963, Fleming grew up in Hopewell Junction, New York; both of his parents were school teachers. In 1985, he earned a Bachelor of Arts degree from Colgate University in economics, summa cum laude. He received a J.D. from Yale Law School, in 1988.

== Career ==
In 1988, Fleming joined the management consulting firm Booz Allen Hamilton as a consultant, later becoming a principal. Fleming was hired by Merrill Lynch in 1992, and was initially tasked with restructuring the firm's municipal bond division. He advised on BlackRock's initial public offering in 1999, and was subsequently promoted to head Merrill Lynch's U.S. financial institutions group. In 2003, he became head of the company's global investment banking and, later, co-president of the capital markets unit. In those roles, Fleming oversaw the merger of Merrill Lynch Investment Management and BlackRock in 2006. In May 2007, Fleming and Ahmass Fakahany were named co-presidents of Merrill Lynch. In June 2008, Fleming became chief operating officer. After the Bank of America merger was completed in January 2009, Fleming resigned from Merrill Lynch to teach at Yale University, becoming a senior research scholar and lecturer in law.

In 2010 Fleming became president of Morgan Stanley Investment Management, also joining its operating committee. In 2011, he became president of global wealth management. Fleming resigned from Morgan Stanley in January 2016, continuing to lecture at Yale. Fleming joined the board of Putnam Investments in August 2016. That year, he assisted Anthony Scaramucci with selling SkyBridge Capital, and in 2017 represented Derek Jeter on the consortium purchase of the Miami Marlins. In 2017, Fleming was announced as the founding CEO of Rockefeller Capital Management, while also taking an ownership stake.

Fleming has been quoted in the press on a number of market-related issues and, in 2022, Fortune described Fleming as a long-time advocate of increasing H1B visas to increase labor availability for specialized jobs in the US market. In September 2022, the Financial Times credited Fleming with greatly increasing Rockefeller Capital Management's presence and asset holdings in US cities. In April 2023, Bloomberg cited Fleming stating the firm had received a significant investment from the Demarais family, with plans to use the funds for expansion. Fleming is also a member of the trustee advisory board at Millennium Management, LLC. Fleming joined the board of directors of BlackRock in April 2025. In October 2025, he announced a successful recapitalization of Rockefeller Capital Management, resulting in its valuation of $6.6 billion.

== Personal life ==
He and his wife Melissa together have three children.
