= Victoria Plucknett =

Welsh actress

Victoria Plucknett is a Welsh television actress, best known for playing the character of Diane Ashurst in the Welsh soap opera Pobol y Cwm and Mary in The Duchess of Duke Street.

She played WPC Beck in Z-Cars. She played Phebe in the 1978 BBC videotaped version of As You Like It.

== Television ==
- Belonging (2006)
- The Sherman Plays (1997)
- Y Palmant Aur (1996-1997)
- The Bill (1993)
- The New Statesman (1984)
- The District Nurse (1984)
- What the Dickens! (1983)
- Z-Cars (1978)
- As You Like It (1978)
- Kilvert's Diary (1977)
- The Duchess of Duke Street (1976–77)
- How Green Was My Valley (1975)
- Pobol y Cwm (1998-2020)

== Films ==
- Cameleon (1997)
