= Financial Clarity =

Financial Clarity, Inc.
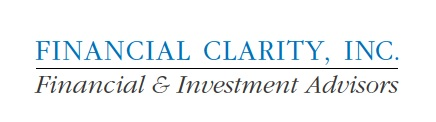
- Industry: Wealth Management
- Founded: July 1992
- Founder: Stanford T. Young
- Headquarters: Mountain View, California, United States
- Key people: Stanford T. Young, Founder and President
- Website: FinancialClarity.com

Financial Clarity, Inc. is a multi-family office located in Mountain View, California. As of December 31, 2016, the company had assets under management of approximately $1.3 billion.

The firm was founded in 1992 by Stanford T. Young. Its advisory clients include wealthy families, venture capitalists, company founders, retirement plans, and foundations.

== Recognition and awards ==
In their June 2015 report, Financial-Planning.com ranked Financial Clarity 3rd nationwide based on average account size.

Financial Clarity has also been recognized by AdvisorOne.com, nationally ranking Financial Clarity 9th in 2012, and 13th in 2010 based on average assets under management per client.

Before it was purchased by AdvisorOne, Wealth Manager Magazine ranked Financial Clarity 13th in 2009 and 8th in 2008.
