= Positive Coaching Alliance =

American non-profit organization

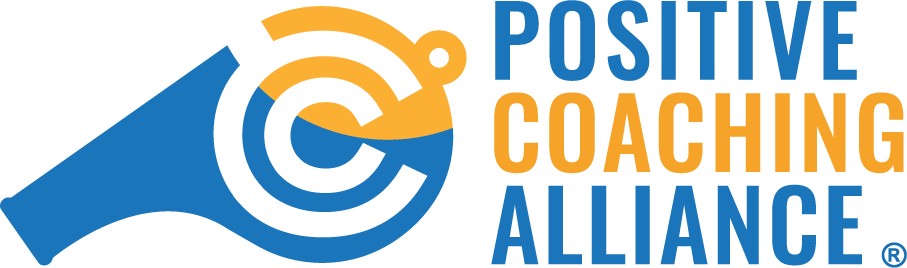
- Founded: 1998; 28 years ago
- Founder: Jim Thompson
- Purpose: Positive Youth Development (athletics)
- Headquarters: Suite 100, 1001 N. Rengstorff Ave., Mountain View, California
- Region served: United States
- Products: Workshops, Scholarships, Books, Online Resources
- Website: positivecoach.org

Positive Coaching Alliance (PCA) is an American non-profit organization which strives to create a positive youth sports environment.

Founded in 1998, PCA has established 18 chapters nationwide and has delivered more than 20,000 live group workshops to over 19.2 million youths. PCA offers interactive online courses and provides tools for coaches, parents, and athletes.

PCA gains support from a National Advisory Board of elite coaches, professional and Olympic athletes, organization leaders, and academics. PCA partners with more than 50 national governing bodies, organizations and professional leagues and teams including Boys & Girls Club of America, National Basketball Association, Major League Baseball, and US Lacrosse.

== PCA Impact ==
PCA programming is research-based. Data indicate that as a result of PCA programming youth experience improved life skills and character development; coaches become more positive and increase their focus on using sports to teach life lessons; youth sports organizations and schools see their cultures become more positive.
