= Stonehage Fleming =

International multi-family office

- Founded: 1873; 153 years ago
- Founder: Robert Fleming
- Website: stonehagefleming.com

Stonehage Fleming was formed in 2014, when Fleming Family & Partners, the family office run by family members of banking pioneer Robert Fleming, merged with Stonehage, an international family office.

The group manages assets worth more than £18 billion and employs over 900 people across 19 offices and 14 geographies.

Stonehage Fleming's headquarters are located in Jersey with other offices are located in London, Channel Islands, Isle of Man, Switzerland, Israel, Luxembourg, South Africa, the US and Canada.

Stonehage was set up in 1976, originally assisting South African families that were migrating from South Africa during the country's apartheid regime. It provides a wide range of financial services, including operating as adviser, fiduciary and investment manager.

Stonehage Fleming announced the appointment of Stuart Parkinson as Group CEO in January 2025.

== History ==
Fleming traces its origins back to 1873 when Dundee-born financier Robert Fleming founded merchant bank Robert Fleming & Co. Robert Fleming had amassed a large personal fortune investing in the American railroads.

Stonehage was set up in 1976, originally to assist South African families that were migrating from South Africa during the country's apartheid regime. It operates as adviser, fiduciary and investment manager.

Fleming Family & Partners (FF&P) was established in 2000 by the Fleming family after the sale of Robert Fleming & Co to Chase Manhattan, which merged with JPMorgan.

== Recent mergers and acquisitions ==
Stonehage and FF&P merged to create a global multi-family office in 2014.

On 21 December 2018, Caledonia Investments plc announced that it had agreed to acquire a minority stake in Stonehage Fleming & Family Partners Limited.

In April 2020, Stonehage Fleming acquired the investment activities of Cavendish Asset Management and took over the running of its range of four OEIC funds.

In January 2022, Stonehage Fleming completed the acquisition of the private client services business of Maitland

In 2023, Stonehage Fleming acquired the South-Africa based investment management firm Rootstock.

== People ==
Giuseppe Ciucci was appointed executive chairman in 2023, having been managing partner and deputy chairman for several years. He joined in 1991 as a client manager and was appointed partner in 1995 before becoming chief executive two years later. John Connolly had been chair from October 2019. He replaced Charles Erasmus, who stepped down after 20 years in the role.
