= The Duchess of Duke Street =

BBC television drama (1976–1977)

- Genre: Drama
- Created by: John Hawkesworth
- Starring: Gemma Jones; Christopher Cazenove; Victoria Plucknett; John Cater; John Welsh; Richard Vernon
- Theme music composer: Alexander Faris
- Country of origin: United Kingdom
- No. of series: 2
- No. of episodes: 31

Production
- Running time: 50 minutes

Original release
- Network: BBC1
- Release: 4 September 1976 – 24 December 1977

The Duchess of Duke Street is a BBC television drama series set in London between 1900 and 1925. It was created by John Hawkesworth, previously the producer of the ITV period drama Upstairs, Downstairs. It starred Gemma Jones as Louisa Leyton Trotter, the eponymous "Duchess" who works her way up from servant to renowned cook to proprietor of the upper-class Bentinck Hotel in Duke Street, St James's in London.

The story is loosely based on the real-life career of Rosa Lewis (née Ovenden), the "Duchess of Jermyn Street", who ran the Cavendish Hotel in London, at the corner of Duke St, St. James's. When the show first aired, there were many people who still remembered her, as she lived until 1952. According to census returns, she was born in Leyton, Essex, to a watchmaker. In the series, Louisa's family name is Leyton, and her father is a clockmaker.

Daphne Fielding wrote The Duchess of Jermyn Street (1964) about Rosa Lewis, but was not formally credited in the BBC production.

The programme lasted for two series totalling 31 episodes, shown in 1976 and 1977.

The Duchess of Duke Street began to air in the United States on October 22, 1978, on the PBS series Masterpiece Theatre. It was nominated for an Emmy Award for Outstanding Limited Series in 1980. The theme music was composed by Alexander Faris.

== Plot summary ==
Beautiful but low-born Louisa Leyton has one driving ambition: to become a great cook. She finds employment as a cook in the household of Lord Henry Norton. His handsome, wealthy, aristocratic nephew, Charlie Tyrrell, attempts to seduce her, but she rebuffs him. Louisa manages to convince Lord Norton's sexist French chef, Monsieur Alex, into accepting her as his apprentice.

The main characters (from left to right): Charles Tyrrell, Louisa Trotter, Major Smith-Barton, Merriman, Starr, and Mary.

With Monsieur Alex, Louisa is unexpectedly called upon to prepare a dinner by herself; she catches the eye of the guest of honour, Edward, the Prince of Wales, who admires both her cooking and her appearance. After the dinner, Louisa is pressured into becoming Edward's mistress. Against her own wishes, she agrees to marry Lord Norton's head butler, Augustus "Gus" Trotter, to maintain the appearance of respectability and to protect the royal reputation. Gus and Louisa are given a house, and her involvement with the prince commences. When Edward's mother, Queen Victoria, dies, Edward assumes the throne as King Edward VII, causing him to end his relationship with Louisa.

Louisa's shaky marriage to Gus becomes strained, both from her affair with the prince and her great success as a private chef. In an effort to help him recover his pride, Louisa purchases the Bentinck Hotel and talks a reluctant Gus into managing it. Before long, abetted by his sister, he lets the authority go to his head. His arrogance alienates the staff and the guests. Once Louisa discovers that he has lavishly entertained his friends and driven away the guests, she throws both him and his meddling sister out. Then she discovers, to her horror, the mountain of bills he has left unpaid.

With only Mary, one of Lord Norton's servants, to assist her, she sets to work to pay the debts, taking any and all cooking jobs, however humble, but finally she collapses from overwork in the street very early one morning. Charlie Tyrrell is passing by (leaving a late-night assignation) and takes her back to the Bentinck. Once he learns of Louisa's financial woes, he convinces her to allow him to help her by becoming a silent partner in the hotel.

Louisa keeps one of the Bentinck's previous employees, the elderly head waiter Merriman, and hires the brisk, soldierly Starr, who is always accompanied by his dog Fred, as the porter. From her former employer, Louisa takes along her loyal Welsh assistant and friend Mary.

Rounding out the principal cast is Major Toby Smith-Barton, an upper-class, retired Army officer. The Major enjoys wagering on the horse races and ends up unable to pay his hotel bill. Reluctant to "toss him out on the street" and liking the man, Louisa allows him to stay on at the Bentinck as a greeter and general helping hand. He eventually becomes her friend and trusted advisor.

Charlie and Louisa eventually have a very passionate romance. Infatuated, Louisa neglects both the hotel and her cooking. Recognising what is happening, the Major has a discreet word with Charlie. Knowing how much the establishment means to Louisa, Charlie leaves for an extended stay in America, giving her a chance to refocus on her business. Devastated at first, Louisa eventually regains her balance and makes the Bentinck a great success, only to discover that she is pregnant. She secretly gives birth to a daughter, Lottie. Louisa accepts Charlie's suggestion that Lottie be discreetly adopted by a young couple who work on his estate. Later, Charlie and Louisa agree it is best they remain friends, not lovers.

Upon the death of his father, Charlie inherits the family fortune and the title of Lord Haslemere. With Louisa's approval, Charlie marries another woman. He tells Louisa that if his marriage has any hope of working, he will have to be away from her, and he gives up his suite at the Bentinck. However, when Charlie's wife later dies, he and Louisa renew their relationship. They decide to postpone their wedding until the end of the First World War. However, Charlie dies of a head injury received while fighting. Louisa is grief-stricken, but gradually recovers.

Inadvertently, the now teenage Lottie learns of her true parentage. Lottie accepts her mother's offer to take her to London. Louisa, not quite knowing what to do with her, eventually sends her to a Swiss finishing school to become a lady. When Lottie returns, she has her heart set on being a singer instead, much to Louisa's initial disapproval.

Louisa's parents occasionally make an appearance. She is on very good terms with her ineffectual but loving father, but not with her critical, abrasively selfish mother. Late in the series, Louisa's father dies, but not before giving his modest savings to his granddaughter to help her pursue her singing career. Louisa becomes reconciled to Lottie's career choice.

== Cast ==
- Gemma Jones as Louisa Trotter (née Leyton)
- Victoria Plucknett as Mary, a maid at the Bentinck
- John Welsh as Merriman, the waiter at the Bentinck
- John Cater as Starr, the hall porter at the Bentinck
- Richard Vernon as Major Smith-Barton
- Christopher Cazenove as Charles "Charlie" Tyrrell, later Lord Haslemere (based on Rupert Baring, 4th Baron Revelstoke
- Mary Healey as Mrs Cochrane, Louisa's head cook at the Bentinck
- Doreen Mantle as Mrs Catchpole, Lord Henry Norton's housekeeper
- Sammie Winmill as Ethel, a maid at the Bentinck
- Holly De Jong as Violet, another maid at the Bentinck
- Donald Burton as Augustus Trotter, Louisa's husband
- June Brown as Mrs Violet Leyton, Louisa's mother
- John Rapley as Mr Ernest Leyton, Louisa's father
- Lalla Ward as Lottie, Louisa's daughter. Ward is only eight years and six months younger than Gemma Jones. Philippa Shackleton played Lottie as a child in one episode.
- Bryan Coleman as Lord Henry Norton, Louisa's employer at the start of the first series
- Christine Pollon as Aunt Gwyneth, Mary's aunt and occasional seamstress at the Bentinck
- George Pravda as Monsieur Alex, cook at Lord Henry Norton's house
- Roger Hammond as the Prince of Wales, later King Edward VII
- Martin Shaw as Arthur, Louisa's brother
- Joanna David as Lady Haslemere

== Series overview ==
Series	Episodes	Originally released	
Series	Episodes	First released	Last released
1	15	4 September 1976	15 December 1976
2	16	3 September 1977	24 December 1977

== Episodes ==
=== Series 1 (1976) ===
No. overall	No. in series	Title	Directed by	Written by	Original release date
1	1	"A Present Sovereign"	Bill Bain	John Hawkesworth	4 September 1976
Wanting to become an excellent cook, outspoken and ambitious Louisa Leyton persuades Monsieur Alex, a French chef working in the London home of Lord Henry Norton, to take her on as an assistant. Resented by other kitchen staff, Louisa bonds with Mary, the target of their frequent malice, forms a friendship with butler Gus Trotter, and fends off the attentions of the aristocratic Charlie Tyrrell. When Lord Henry unexpectedly returns during Monsieur Alex's holiday, she must cook dinner for a group that includes the Prince of Wales.
2	2	"Honour and Obey"	Cyril Coke	John Hawkesworth and Jeremy Paul	11 September 1976
When the Prince of Wales asks to borrow Louisa's services as a cook, it turns out that more than her cooking appeals to him. She reluctantly becomes his mistress. To preserve appearances, she is pressured into marrying Gus Trotter, who has fallen in love with her, even though she does not return his feelings. The newly married couple leave Lord Norton's employ and live in the house given to them for her royal services.
3	3	"A Nice Class of Premises"	Bill Bain	David Butler and John Hawkesworth	18 September 1976
The death of Queen Victoria ends Louisa's relationship with the Prince, now King Edward VII. Under the influence of his sister, Nora, Gus wants to take in lodgers to make ends meet. Instead, over his objections, Louisa becomes a private chef, taking on Mary as her assistant. When Gus's drinking becomes a problem, Louisa buys the Bentinck Hotel in Duke Street and installs him as manager in an attempt to restore his pride, with disastrous results.
4	4	"The Bargain"	Cyril Coke	John Hawkesworth and Jack Rosenthal	25 September 1976
After throwing Gus and Nora out of the hotel (and her life), Louisa sets to work to try to repay the enormous amount of debt they accumulated, with Mary's assistance. When Louisa collapses from overwork, Charlie Tyrrell becomes a silent investor in the hotel and resides in a permanent private suite there.
5	5	"A Bed of Roses"	Bill Bain	John Hawkesworth	2 October 1976
The newly refurbished Bentinck reopens, with the hotel's long-serving, aged head waiter, Merriman, and new hall porter Starr and his dog, Fred, Under Louisa's management, it becomes a success, until her romance with Charlie causes her to neglect the business. When this is pointed out to Charlie, knowing how much the hotel means to her, he breaks off their relationship and leaves for a while. Louisa is devastated, but recovers and refocuses on the business - only to discover she is pregnant. Leaving Mary in charge, she goes off to have the baby in secret, a girl she names Charlotte. Charlie, now Lord Haslemere, finds Charlotte a place with a childless couple who work on his estate.
6	6	"For Love or Money"	Raymond Menmuir	John Hawkesworth	9 October 1976
A visiting German baron claiming to be a friend of Lord Haslemere's creates trouble at the Bentinck with some of the other guests.
7	7	"A Lady of Virtue"	Cyril Coke	John Hawkesworth and Jeremy Paul	16 October 1976
When the Liberal Party celebrates a by-election result at the Bentinck, a politically ambitious Member of Parliament sets out to seduce a visiting artist believed to be utterly devoted to her husband.
8	8	"Trouble and Strife"	Raymond Menmuir	John Hawkesworth and Jeremy Paul	23 October 1976
While Louisa takes a holiday in France, Starr's former common-law wife, Lizzie, blackmails him into helping her get a job as laundry maid at the Bentinck. Starr finally confides in the Major (a longtime hotel patron and quasi-official member of the staff) after money is found missing from a hotel guest's room.
9	9	"The Outsiders"	Simon Langton	John Hawkesworth and Rosemary Anne Sisson	30 October 1976
Charlie pushes Louisa to accept as a hotel guest an obviously unsuitable and unassuming man. Seeing that Charlie is at a loose end, Louisa arranges for an art dealer to include his paintings in an exhibition, where he learns the difference between being an amateur and having real talent.
10	10	"Lottie's Boy"	Cyril Coke	John Hawkesworth and Julia Jones	6 November 1976
Mary's disapproving Aunt Gwyneth, the servants' ball, and attentive guest Marcus Carrington sow dissent between Louisa and Mary, whose abrupt departure leaves the hotel in a muddle. Louisa and the Major unwisely give their money to Carrington, a risk-taking wunderkind financier and the son of an old friend of the Major's, to invest in the stock market.
11	11	"No Letters, No Lawyers"	Simon Langton	Bill Craig and John Hawkesworth	13 November 1976
An altercation over a departing guest's refusal to pay his bill lands him in court and the hotel in the newspapers, to the displeasure of his newspaper publisher uncle, who sends a journalist to dig up dirt undercover at the hotel. The resultant publicity gives the owners of the freehold of the hotel building ammunition for their demand to renegotiate the terms of the lease now that the Bentinck is successful. With the hotel at risk, Louisa is forced to threaten the newspaper with a libel action, pushing the journalist to unearth the details of her past life.
12	12	"A Matter of Honour"	Bill Bain	Julian Bond and John Hawkesworth	20 November 1976
The newly married former equerry to the King asks Louisa to cook a special dinner at his Ascot home for a group of guests which includes Charlie Haslemere, but insufficient staff and a row over a racing result nearly derail it.
13	13	"One Night's Grace"	Cyril Coke	John Hawkesworth and Ken Taylor	27 November 1976
A mysterious young woman causes dissent between Charlie and Louisa, speculation among the staff, and a visit from the police when she comes to stay with Charlie for a few days.
14	14	"Plain Sailing"	Raymond Menmuir	John Hawkesworth and Jeremy Paul	4 December 1976
Charlie is caught in the middle when Louisa buys a house at Cowes and moves her entire operation to the seaside for a few weeks in the summer, upsetting some of the members of the yachting club next door. Among Louisa's guests is the professional dancer Irene Baker, who counts Charlie as one of her many conquests.
15	15	"A Test of Love"	Bill Bain	John Hawkesworth	11 December 1976
The funeral of King Edward VII provides the occasion for a visit from Louisa's former employer, Lord Henry Norton. As Charlie Haslemere's sole surviving relation, he tells Louisa it is time for Charlie to marry - and he thinks he has found the right woman. However, as soon as Charlie's engagement to Margaret Wormold is announced, Irene Baker sues him for breach of promise. Louisa and Merriman are required to testify in the court case.

=== Series 2 (1977) ===
No. overall	No. in series	Title	Directed by	Written by	Original release date
16	1	"Family Matters"	Bill Bain	Julia Jones	3 September 1977
When Louisa's brother returns from his travels after a long time away, his doting mother talks her reluctant daughter into employing him, as the hotel is short-staffed. Arthur soon antagonises the other staff, and Louisa's mother also causes problems when she and Louisa's father stay at the hotel. Louisa tells them all to leave, precipitating an ugly family quarrel.
17	2	"Poor Catullus"	Cyril Coke	Jeremy Paul	10 September 1977
Two young men play a prank, sending Louisa love letters which are purportedly from their Oxford University professor. Louisa and Professor Stubbs soon turn the tables on them, but she is tempted by his somewhat inebriated offer to take her to America for an extended period. The next morning, however, he remembers nothing of the previous night. Charlie's wife, Margaret, seeks Louisa's help in searching for a house in London, and confides in her about personal matters.
18	3	"A Lesson in Manners"	Cyril Coke	Rosemary Anne Sisson	17 September 1977
When an elderly but vibrant Bentinck regular guest dies unexpectedly after an operation, she surprises everyone by leaving nearly all of her considerable wealth to her attentive chauffeur Prince rather than her indifferent and spendthrift nephew Eddie Sturgess. When Prince considers entering British society, Louisa decides it would be fun to pass him off as a gentleman, under the tutelage of Eddie and the Major, despite the latter's warnings. The Major is proved right in the end.
19	4	"Winter Lament"	Simon Langton	Maggie Wadey	24 September 1977
Louisa visits the Haslemeres at their country estate and finds that Margaret is behaving strangely and the marriage is under great strain. Louisa also sees her daughter Lottie for the first time since giving her up as a baby. Louisa tries her best to help Margaret, but in the end the disturbed and emaciated woman wanders outside one night and is found dead the next morning.
20	5	"The Passing Show"	Bill Bain	John Hawkesworth	1 October 1977
Louisa rouses Charlie out of his depression after Margaret's death by organising a dinner for him and some of his friends. Meanwhile Sir Martin Mallory, a famous but ageing actor staying at the Bentinck, seduces an admirer, hotel chambermaid Violet. When Louisa discovers them together in his room, she sacks Violet without a reference. Unable to find another job, Violet unsuccessfully takes up streetwalking. An understanding police inspector persuades Louisa to relent a little by providing a reference and help to find more respectable employment.
21	6	"Your Country Needs You"	Simon Langton	John Hawkesworth	8 October 1977
When Great Britain enters the First World War, Louisa is ultra-patriotic, until Charlie joins the Coldstream Guards. The Major returns to active duty. In exchange for getting Starr reinstated in the Army (it was revealed in a previous episode that Starr was a sergeant in the Sudan Campaign; he caught his young wife with another soldier, and was imprisoned and dishonourably discharged for his subsequent actions), the Major gets Louisa to hire Gaspard, a Belgian refugee.
22	7	"The Patriots"	Bill Bain	Bill Craig and John Hawkesworth	15 October 1977
Autumn 1915. Louisa is cold to shirkers who avoid military service, particularly Bentinck resident Mr Appleby. A naval intelligence lieutenant uncovers an espionage ring which is reading the correspondence of high-ranking officers who frequent the Bentinck. Gaspard commits suicide to avoid arrest. His confederate, American hotel guest Brewster, is not so quick. Appleby is also a spy, but for the British.
23	8	"The Reluctant Warrior"	Simon Langton	John Hawkesworth and Rosemary Anne Sisson	22 October 1977
Winter 1916. The hotel sustains minor damage from a German bomb attack. Fred, Starr's dog, goes missing in the blast. Some soldiers are assigned to deal with what may be a buried unexploded bomb in the Bentinck's backyard. Ethel is attracted to one of them, Clive, a conscientious objector who is despised by everyone else. Among Louisa's guests are an 18-year-old young wife whom Louis recognises, and the officer with whom she has eloped. Tired of waiting for a bomb disposal expert and fed up with the sneers aimed at him, Clive digs around and finds there is no bomb. He also discovers the body of Fred. Before Clive leaves, Ethel accepts his engagement ring.
24	9	"Tea and a Wad"	Cyril Coke	John Hawkesworth	29 October 1977
Spring 1917. The hotel is empty as repairs are being made. The Major persuades Louisa to set up a canteen in Boulogne for troops with no place to go while waiting for transportation back to Britain. A helpful soldier eventually confesses to Mary that he is a deserter. She consults the Major, who comes up with a plan to get him out of his predicament. A rival do-gooder creates trouble for Louisa both in Boulogne and London, but the general in charge turns out to be a Bentinck regular. Louisa agrees to marry Charlie after the war ends.
25	10	"Shadows"	Bill Bain	John Hawkesworth and Jeremy Paul	5 November 1977
Summer 1918. Louisa opens the Bentinck to recuperating soldiers. Mary is attracted to Brian, one of the convalescents. Charlie receives a head wound and returns to the hotel for a rest. The wound takes a turn for the worse, and he begins to go blind. An eminent brain surgeon advises against surgery so soon after the previous operation. Charlie dies quietly while sitting in Louisa's parlour as she is talking to him.
26	11	"Where There's A Will"	Cyril Coke	John Hawkesworth and Julia Jones	12 November 1977
Louisa is in dire financial straits, but stubbornly refuses to cash the cheques of the soldiers who stayed at her hotel. Grief-stricken over Charlie's death, she decides to sell up the Bentinck. Her father makes her read a letter from Charlie, which gives her renewed resolve to go on. With the money he left her in his will, she sets about restoring the hotel to its former glory.
27	12	"The Legion of the Living"	Gerry Mill	John Hawkesworth and Maggie Wadey	26 November 1977
Louisa returns to the Haslemeres' estate for a memorial service. Lottie learns her true parentage. Louisa offers to take Lottie back to London.
28	13	"Lottie"	Bill Bain	John Hawkesworth and Jeremy Paul	3 December 1977
Louisa tells Mary, Starr, and Merriman that Lottie is her daughter. She has the Major show Lottie the sights of London, but inevitably, rumours swirl around her. Brian returns, embittered by the war and irritated by Mary's attentions. He leaves, breaking Mary's heart. Louisa decides to send Lottie to a Swiss finishing school.
29	14	"Blossom Time"	Gerry Mill	John Hawkesworth and Jeremy Paul	10 December 1977
Lottie returns to the Bentinck on a school holiday, bringing with her one of her teachers, Miss Olive Bradford. The Major and Miss Bradford fall in love and become engaged. Lottie falls for a handsome young man, but when she incautiously reveals her parentage, his interest in her vanishes.
30	15	"Poor Little Rich Girl"	Cyril Coke	John Hawkesworth and Julia Jones	17 December 1977
Louisa and Lottie, now aged 22, clash over her future after she takes singing lessons and spends time at nightclubs. Lottie is determined to become a singer. She meets her maternal grandfather for the first time. He becomes her ally, giving her his meagre life savings before he dies. Lottie moves in with her grandmother, who tells Louisa she understands Lottie, whereas she could never fathom Louisa.
31	16	"Ain't We Got Fun"	Bill Bain	John Hawkesworth	24 December 1977
Louisa permits an American woman to write her biography, though she insists on final approval of the result. Merriman wins £500 from a newspaper contest and samples a life of leisure, even sauntering into the Bentinck for a drink, before his money runs out and he returns to his usual post. Mary and Starr become engaged. Louisa is furious at first, as she has a policy of not employing married people, but eventually gives in.

== Home media ==
The series was first released on DVD in the UK by Universal Pictures UK in 2003 on the Playback/BBC label, and re-released in 2015. All the UK releases have multiple episodes cut together into two or three hour blocks removing the beginning and end titles of each individual episode. This was a common practice in the UK when VHS releases of TV series started and it would appear the same copies were used for the DVD releases.

The complete series was released on DVD in the Netherlands by Just Entertainment in 2014 and features the original English audio with optional Dutch subtitles. While the first series in this set is restored to the original episodic format, the second series is again cut together into longer blocks like the UK releases.

The "Complete Collection" DVD set released by Acorn Media in the US in 2012 features both series in their original episodic format.
