= Sarsgrove Wood =

Woodland in Oxfordshire, England

Coordinates: 51.916°N 1.559°W

- Site of Special Scientific Interest
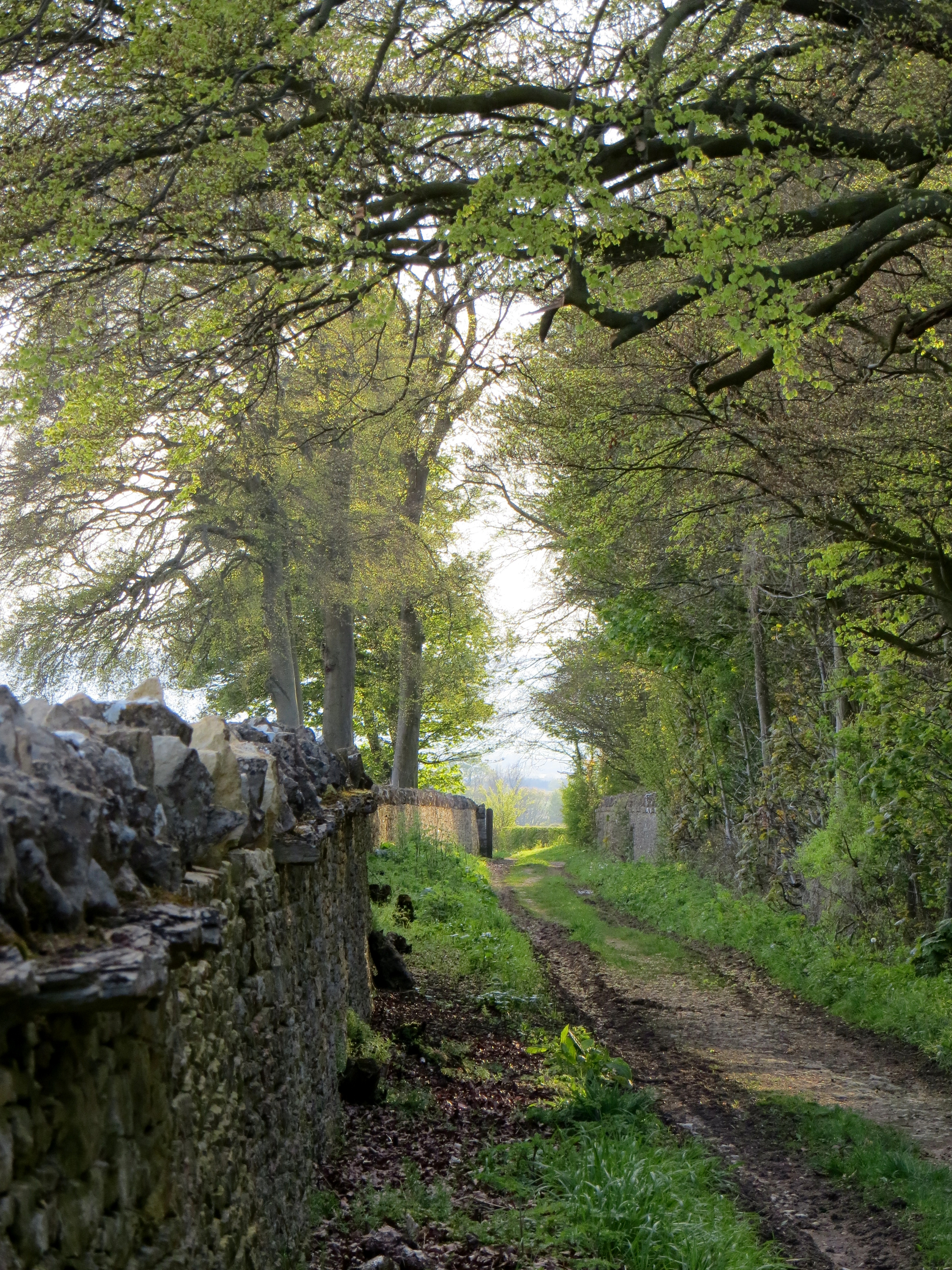
- Location of Sarsgrove Wood.
- Area of search: Oxfordshire
- Grid reference: SP 304 243
- Interest: Biological
- Area: 41.9 hectares (104 acres)
- Notification date: 1985
- Location map: Magic Map

Sarsgrove Wood is a 41.9-hectare (104-acre) biological Site of Special Scientific Interest south of Chipping Norton in Oxfordshire.

This ancient wood has a diverse geology resulting in a variety of soil conditions. A stream with poorly drained valley walls runs through the wood. More freely-drained areas have ground flora including early-purple orchid, primrose, bluebell, early dog-violet, sweet violet and narrow-leaved everlasting pea.

The site is private land with no public access.
