= Robert Fleming & Co. =

Merchant bank founded in 1873 and sold to Chase Manhattan Bank

- Type: Private
- Industry: Banking
- Founded: 1873; 153 years ago
- Founder: Robert Fleming
- Defunct: 2000
- Fate: Acquired
- Successor: Chase Manhattan Bank
- Headquarters: London, England

Robert Fleming & Co., known as Flemings, was an asset manager and merchant bank founded in Dundee, Scotland, in 1873. In 1909, the firm moved its headquarters to London, England. It was sold to Chase Manhattan Bank for over $7 billion in 2000. It was a 50% partner in the Asian investment bank Jardine Fleming.

== History ==
The firm of Robert Fleming & Co. was founded by Robert Fleming, a successful investment manager, in Dundee, Scotland, in 1873. Fleming had worked at first for a manufacturer of jute fabrics used for sandbags in the American Civil War. The firm was originally formed as a series of investment trusts, pooling money from Scottish investors into overseas ventures, and later moved into merchant banking. In 1909, the firm moved its headquarters to London.

In 1873, Robert Fleming cofounded the Scottish American Investment Company for the purpose of investing in high risk, high return American railroad bonds. Flemings assumed a central role in the 1886 battle with Jay Gould for control of the Texas & Pacific Railway, in which the Flemings bondholder group ultimately triumphed. Overall, Flemings claimed to have made a 40% return on investments in US railroads.

In 1970, Flemings entered into an investment banking joint venture with Hong Kong–based Jardine Matheson, forming Jardine Fleming. Despite restructuring, Flemings saw its investment banking and asset management market share decline in the 1990s as global investment banks like Morgan Stanley and Lazard moved into their markets. The Fleming name was tarnished by a scandal in 1996, when Jardine Fleming was ordered to pay $19 million to fund investors for alleged abusive and unsupervised securities allocation practices by its asset management division.

In April 2000, Robert Flemings Holdings was sold to Chase Manhattan Bank for $7.7 billion. Although the sale came about partially as a result of Flemings’ weakened position, it was part of two larger trends: consolidation in the financial services industry as large U.S. commercial banks acquired investment banks upon the repeal of the Glass–Steagall Act, and the sale of U.K. merchant banks to foreign acquirors. Flemings, with almost no U.S. assets, was considered a particularly good fit for increasingly globally minded Chase, whose assets lay largely in the United States. In the sale, about 130 Fleming family members pocketed approximately $2.3 billion for their 30 percent stake. When Chase merged with J.P. Morgan & Co. in 2001, the Flemings asset management business was rebranded J.P. Morgan Fleming, and Fleming Premier Banking was sold to Abbey National's Cater Allen subsidiary.

Members of the Fleming family set up an asset management company, Fleming Family & Partners, which in November 2014 merged with Stonehage Group, an international family office with its roots in South Africa, to create Stonehage Fleming Family and Partners.
