= Multi-family office =

Financial investment organization

A multi-family office (MFO) is an independent organization that manages the wealth of more than one rich family. Like a family office, MFOs typically provide tax and estate planning, risk management, financial counsel, trusteeship, coordination of professionals, investment advice, and philanthropic foundation management. Some manage lifestyles, household staff and travel arrangements. Families that use MFOs typically have a net worth of more than $50 million.

MFOs can be created when:

- a single family office opens its doors to additional clients or merges with another single family office
- a team of advisors starts one up, typically with some combination of investment, tax and or legal professional credentials.
- an existing financial institution, most often a bank or brokerage firm, creates an MFO subsidiary or division.

In the United States, many MFOs are registered investment advisors, some are trust companies, and a handful are accounting or law firms.

== History ==
The family office concept has its roots in the 6th century, when a majordomo would speak, make arrangements, or run affairs on behalf of a royal family, and later the families of the upper nobility.

The modern family office was developed in the 19th century. In 1838, the family of J.P. Morgan founded the House of Morgan to manage its assets; in 1882, the Rockefellers founded a family office of their own. Over the decades, many owners of single family offices decided to offer its services to other families to split the costs of management.

In the 1980s and 1990s, the number of wealthy families increased just as rapid developments in technology in financial markets made it difficult to attract and retain employees who could stay abreast of changes. This, along with the consolidation of the financial services industry, reduced the role of banks' trust departments that traditionally served wealthy families. These trends led more families to seek family office-type services.

== Characteristics ==
MFOs tend to have the following characteristics:

Independence: MFOs typically do not sell (traditional products that a family might typically encounter from a brokerage firm) and generally are not compensated for the products used by clients. MFOs usually follow a "service delivery model" holding themselves out as an objective provider of advice that places the interests of their clients first.

Breadth and Integration of Services: MFOs provide a wide array of services and typically oversee their clients' entire financial universe. MFOs will have full information about their clients investments, tax situation, estate plan and family dynamics. With this information the MFO can assist in structuring and administering the clients' financial universe in an optimal fashion.

Professionals with Diverse Skills and Deep Specialties: MFO professionals provide a wide array of advice and assistance to their clients. MFOs also have to be able to provide specialty knowledge on certain topics such as: income taxation, estate planning, and investments.

High Touch Services: MFOs have high average account sizes (usually in the tens of millions) and low client to employee ratios (around 3 to 1 range). Large account sizes combined with low client-to-employee ratios allows a great deal of focus and attention on each client family. Meetings with clients often occur many times a year.

Multi-Generational Planning: MFOs typically work with an entire family – the patriarch/matriarch, their children and grandchildren. Planning encompasses the family's goals which typically includes passing wealth down to lower generations in a tax efficient manner. Children and grandchildren are clients and are counseled on investments, taxes, estate planning, and philanthropy from an early age. MFOs often coordinate and moderate family meetings for their client families.

Outsourcing: MFOs do not typically provide all services in-house. It is common for some of the investment management to be outsourced to independent money managers. Custody and tax return preparation are also commonly outsourced.

Focus on Taxable Investor: Most MFOs have a myopic focus on taxable investors as the bulk of their client's assets are subject to short and long term capital gains. This is unique to very high-net-worth families. Most investment research (academic and financial service industry) is geared toward the institutional investor and foundations (with very different tax concerns than individuals and families). The bulk of the research done for the individual investor relates to 401ks and IRAs.

Ownership and Control: The ownership of multi-family offices varies widely. Some firms remain majority-owned by founding families, ensuring long-term alignment with client interests. Others are run by professional management teams and, increasingly, by private equity-backed structures. Private equity investment has introduced opportunities for scaling and consolidation but has also raised concerns about potential conflicts of interest, as investor-owned MFOs may face commercial pressures that differ from the priorities of client families.

== Benefits ==
MFOs may have one or more of the following benefits:

- Objective financial advice
- Creative solutions to financial issues
- Clearinghouse for financial, investment, tax and estate planning ideas
- Cross-fertilization of ideas resulting from solving issues for multiple families
- Services are typically "all you can eat" for asset based fee or flat retainer fee
- Advice from professional team with diverse backgrounds
- Coordination of other advisers
- Proactive advice – a function of low client to employee ratio and frequency of meetings
- Delivery of "best of breed" money managers, custody, insurance, loans, etc.
- Negotiated cost savings with other financial providers (e.g. investment management, custody, trading costs)
- Integration of client's estate planning, income taxes, investments, philanthropic goals and family situation

== Typical services provided ==
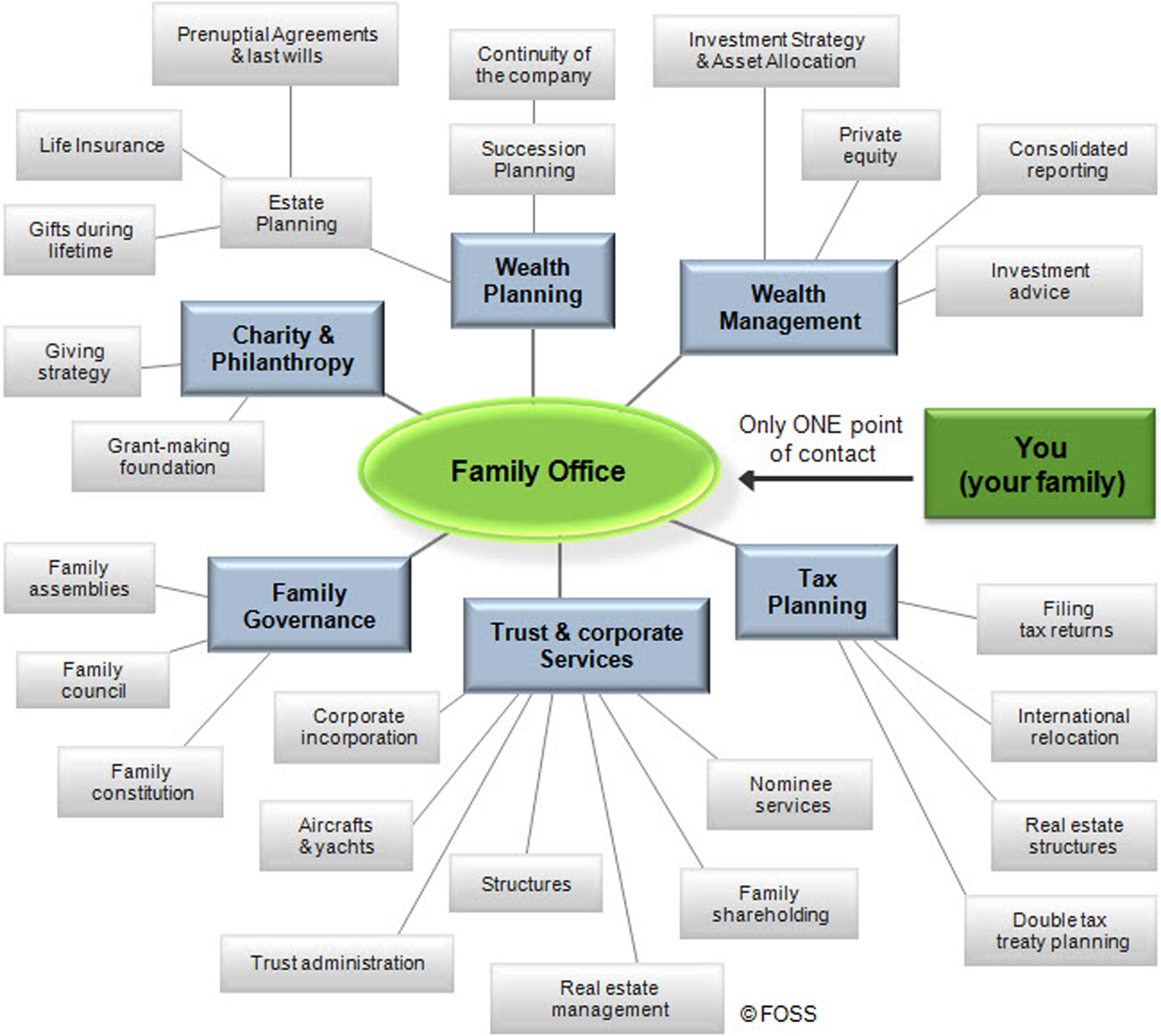
Chart of family office services

- Trustee Services
- Coordination of Professionals
- Cash Management
- Global Asset Allocation and Investment Strategy Consulting
- Comprehensive Performance Reporting
- Investment Manager Selection and Monitoring
- Portfolio Management
- Estate Planning
- Philanthropic Planning
- Life Insurance Analysis
- Debt Structure and Analysis – Bank Financing
- Tax Return Preparation
- Foundation Management
- Entity Administration (FLPs, CLTs, CRTs, Installment Sales, etc.)
- Aircraft Consulting
- Risk Management & Asset Protection Consulting
- Fraud Detection/Accountability
- Real Estate Management
- Family Business Advisory
- Family Counseling/Family Meetings
- Sufficiency and Retirement Planning
- Document Management and Recordkeeping
- Bill Payment Services
- Personal Financial Statement Preparation

== Multi-family office industry ==
The industry grew to $170 billion of assets under management in 2003, a 17% increase over the prior year; in 2004, the increase was 26.6%.

New Formats: In recent years, MFOs have developed beyond traditional models. Shared-service platforms allow families to pool infrastructure such as consolidated reporting, compliance, or technology systems. Digital-first and "virtual" family offices provide modular, often tech-enabled services at lower cost. Hybrid approaches combine in-house expertise with outsourced specialists, while some MFOs differentiate by offering impact investing, private markets access, or governance facilitation. These emerging formats reflect growing demand for flexible and cost-efficient structures that still deliver institutional-grade sophistication.

== Notable multi-family offices ==
- Hottinger Group, a privately owned independent firm with its roots in high finance dating back to 1786. From its London headquarters it oversees the financial and business needs of 200 families from 15 countries with $65 billion of collective wealth. Most recently awarded Family Office of the Year in 2017, 2019, 2020 & 2022 by the City of London Wealth Management Awards.
- Bessemer Trust, an independent firm that was founded in 1907 and oversees more than $106 billion for over 2,300 families, foundations and endowments.
- Stonehage Fleming, with $43 billion in assets under administration, including $11 billion in assets under management, and total revenues of about $160 million. Serving over 250 wealthy families (2014).
- Rockefeller Capital Management, originally established in 1882 by the Rockefeller family as a private family office.

== See also ==
- Family office
- Private foundation
- Investment management
