= Family office =

Family controlled investment group

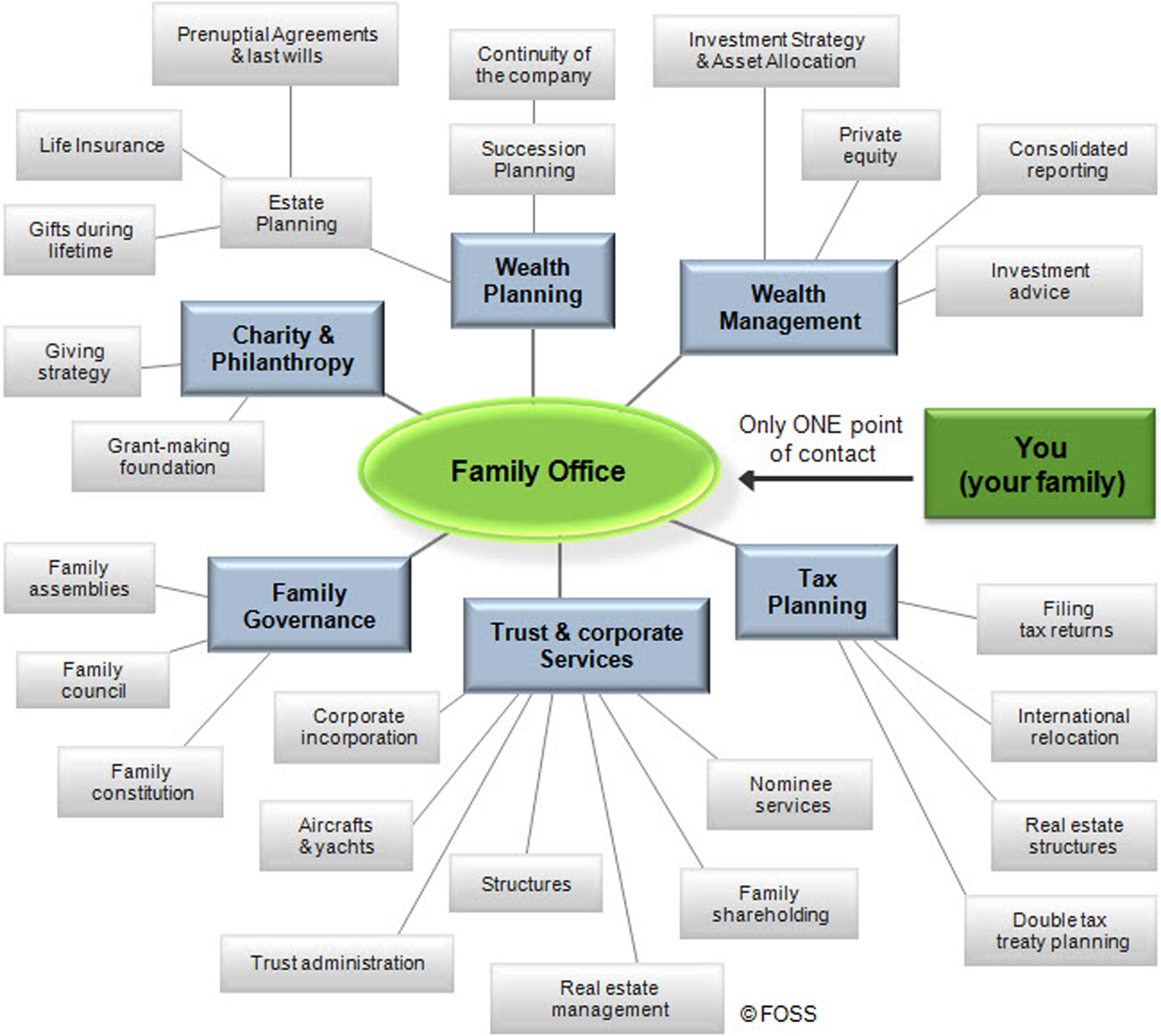
Chart of family office services

A family office, or a single family office (SFO), is a privately held company that handles investment management and wealth management for a wealthy family with the goal being to effectively grow and transfer wealth across generations. The company's financial capital is the family's own wealth.

Family offices also may handle tasks such as managing household staff, making travel arrangements, property management, day-to-day accounting and payroll activities, management of legal affairs, family management services, family governance, financial and investor education, coordination of philanthropy and private foundations, and succession planning. A family office can cost over $1 million a year to operate, so the family's net worth usually exceeds $50–100 million in investable assets. Some family offices, dubbed multi-family offices, accept investments from people who are not members of the owning family.

A family office is, or operates as, a corporation or limited liability company, with officers and a support staff. Officers are compensated per their arrangement with the family, usually with incentives based on the profits or capital gains generated by the office. Family offices are often built around core assets that are professionally managed. As profits are created, assets are deployed into investments. Family offices might invest in private equity, venture capital opportunities, hedge funds, and commercial real estate. Many family offices turn to hedge funds for alignment of interest based on risk and return assessment goals. Some family offices remain passive and just allocate funds to outside managers.

== History ==
The Rockefeller family pioneered family offices in the late 19th century.

Family offices started gaining popularity in the 1980s, and since 2005, as the ranks of the super-rich grew to record proportions, family offices swelled proportionately.

In 2007, the Ayer family office highlighted family office risk when a "family confidant allegedly siphoned about $58 million away in a few years".

As the Dodd–Frank Wall Street Reform and Consumer Protection Act of 2010 was being written, single-family offices, led by the Private Investor Coalition, convinced Congress to exempt SFOs from having to meet certain criteria from the definition of investment adviser under the Investment Advisers Act of 1940. Previously, such family offices were deemed to be investment advisers and relied on the "less than 15 clients" rule to avoid registration under the Act, a rule that was eliminated under Dodd-Frank. The Obama U.S. Securities and Exchange Commission under chair Mary Schapiro promulgated the final "family office rules" on June 22, 2011, after hearing from around 100 family offices through their attorneys, who invoked solicitor–client privilege in the communications with the SEC. In the words of one solicitor: "The extended family that controls the family office has asked this firm to provide the Commission with comments to the Proposed Rule on its behalf, as it believes that providing comments directly to the Commission might compromise its privacy, including publicly revealing the manner by which it conducts its family office business."

Family offices became more common starting in 2010, after the rapid increase in valuations of technology companies created many rich people. In 2010, the academic Journal of Family Business Strategy was launched by Torsten Pieper to "publish research that contributes new knowledge and understanding to the field of family business".

According to a 2015 report by the Financial Times, the label "family office" was increasingly replaced by other business names, such as "private investment office", to provide "private company services" or "strategic philanthropy advice". Globally in 2015, one source numbered 79,000 families that controlled roughly $19 trillion in assets.

In January 2021, it was revealed that Leon Black paid Jeffrey Epstein $158 million from 2012 to 2017 for family office tax advice.

In spring 2021, the implosion of Archegos Capital Management drew the scrutiny of several regulators and the questioning of Sherrod Brown, Chair of the US Senate Banking Committee. It came to light that family offices were reportedly "more loosely regulated than other investment vehicles, with fewer disclosure requirements". In response to these concerns, US Representative Alexandria Ocasio-Cortez introduced The Family Office Regulation Act of 2021, H.R. 4620, which would limit the use of the family office exemption from registration as an investment advisor with the SEC to offices with $750 million or less in assets under management. The bill would also prevent persons who are barred or subject to final orders for conduct constituting fraud, manipulation, or deceit from being associated with a family office. This view, however, is not shared by a number of regulators and commentators, including Commissioner Hester Peirce of the Securities and Exchange Commission (SEC) and Commissioner Brian Quintenz of the Commodity Futures Trading Commission (CFTC), who argued in 2021 that family offices do not need new regulations.

== Traditional and modern usage ==
A traditional single family office is a business run by and for a single family. Its sole function is to centralize the management of a significant family fortune. Typically, these organizations employ staff to manage investments, taxes, philanthropic activities, trusts, and legal matters. The family office invests the family's money, manages all of the family's assets, and disburses payments to family members as required.

According to Spear's Wealth Management Survey in 2022, "Family offices are private companies that support a number of functions for wealthy families including the smooth running of day-to-day affairs as well as more complex matters involving wealth management and strategy. These issues are particularly important for families with assets and interests in multiple jurisdictions."

In June 2008, Wharton Magazine reported that "About 1,000 SFOs are in operation around the world catering to families with a least $100 million in assets. More than half the SFOs are managing family wealth of more than $1 billion." Services handled by the traditional SFO include investment management, property management, day-to-day accounting and payroll activities, and management of legal affairs, and they often provide family management services, which includes family governance, financial and investment education, philanthropy coordination, and succession planning. An academic investigation defined SFOs as "professional organizations dedicated to managing family wealth and family matters, represent the leading edge of a broad trend in substantial personal wealth accumulation. The worldwide concentration of wealth in the hands of relatively few is well documented. As the rich grow even richer, and particularly as fortunes filter down through generations, wealth management becomes ever more complex. It is in this context that SFOs—dedicated to the service of one multi-millionaire or billionaire family—have evolved."

== Tax avoidance ==
Family offices in the United States are politically active, making campaign contributions to many political candidates and political action committees of all political parties. They use sophisticated tax avoidance techniques which can considerably reduce the tax burden, at least in the United States. The Private Investor Coalition, an association of family offices, lobbies the U.S. Securities and Exchange Commission for favorable rulings. Allies such as the Managed Funds Association, an association of hedge funds, actively lobby the United States Congress to preserve and expand provisions which allow tax avoidance. Some have argued that a reduction in agency funding as a result of the IRS targeting controversy in 2013 has limited government efforts to conduct income tax audits on the income tax returns of wealthy families, and entities controlled by them via the Global High Wealth Industry Group.

== Financing and liquidity ==
Family offices hold a large share of their assets in private markets. A 2025 UBS survey of 317 family offices reported an average allocation of 21% to private markets in 2024, and a 2025 Citi survey of 346 family offices found that 70% made direct investments. Because such holdings cannot be sold quickly, family offices borrow in several ways to raise liquidity without selling investments. Lombard loans from private banks are secured against marketable assets such as listed shares, bonds and investment funds. Net asset value (NAV) facilities, a structure developed for private equity funds, are instead secured on the value of a portfolio of private fund interests and other private assets, and are more often structured as term loans than as revolving lines. Family office NAV facilities typically cover a mixed portfolio of real estate, private equity, private credit, venture and hedge fund holdings and, unlike fund facilities, have no fixed investment period. The main alternative is to sell fund interests on the private-equity secondary market, where limited partner portfolios traded at an average of 87% of net asset value in 2025.

== Select list of family offices ==
- Archegos Capital Management
- Ballmer Group
- Bayshore Global Management
- Bessemer Trust
- Bezos Expeditions
- Cascade Investment
- Cresset
- DFO Management
- Dubai Holding
- Edipresse
- Emerson Collective
- ICONIQ Capital
- Kirkbi
- Mayfair Vermögensverwaltung
- Mousse Partners
- Robert Wood Johnson Foundation
- Soros Fund Management
- Spell Capital Partners
- Thiel Capital
- Vulcan Inc.
- Whittier Trust Company
- Willett Advisors
- Winklevoss Capital Management

== See also ==
- Private foundation
- Trust fund
