= London Borough of Croydon =

- London borough
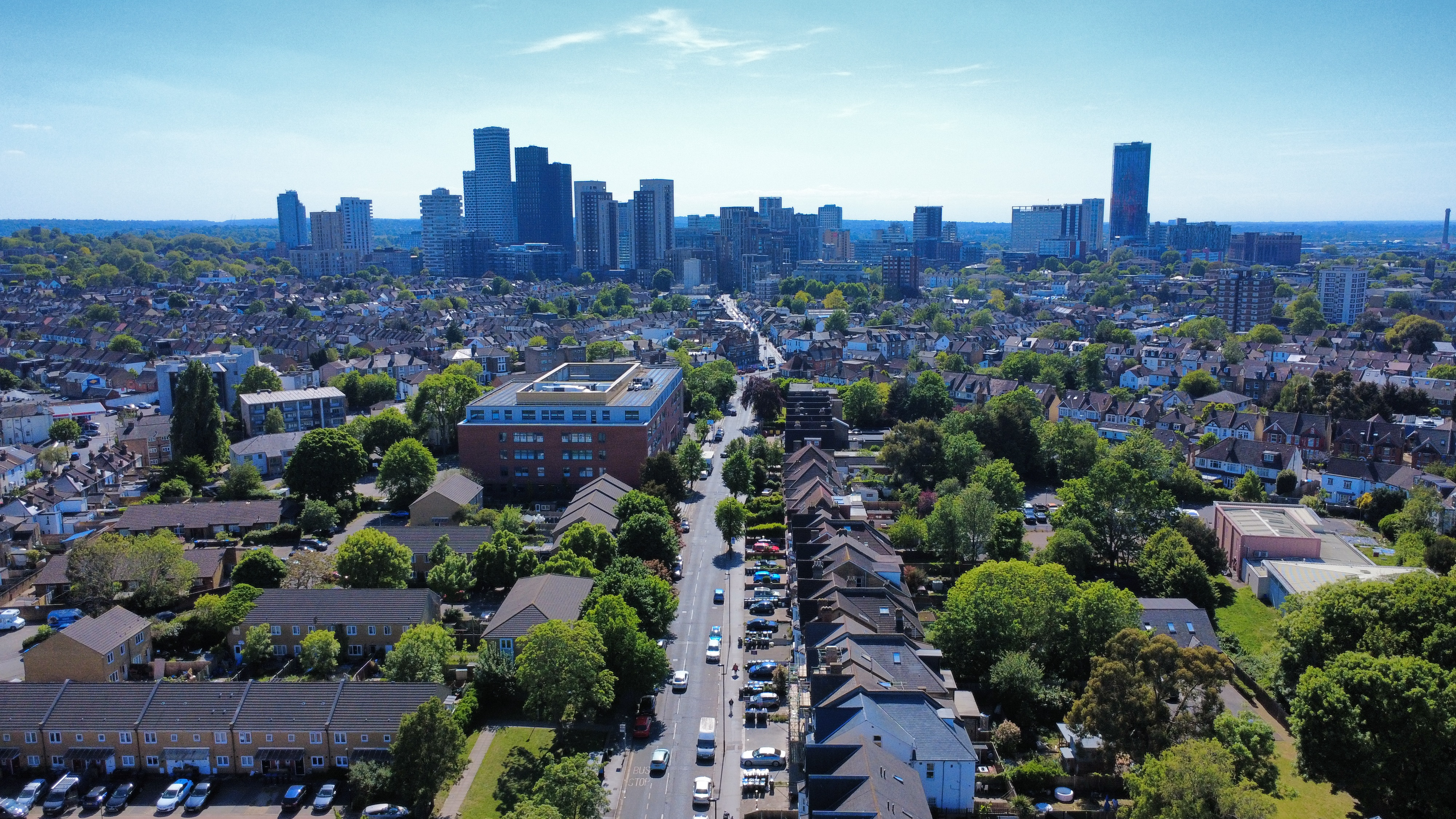
- Central Croydon from Morland Road in 2025.

- Coat of arms Council logo
- Motto(s): Ad summa nitamur (Let us strive for perfection)
- Croydon shown within Greater London
- Coordinates: 51°20′N 0°05′W
- Sovereign state: United Kingdom
- Constituent country: England
- Region: London
- Ceremonial county: Greater London
- Created: 1 April 1965
- Admin HQ: Bernard Weatherill House, 8 Mint Walk, Croydon

Government
  - Type: London borough council
  - Body: Croydon London Borough Council
  - Executive Mayor: Jason Perry
  - London Assembly: Neil Garratt (Con) AM for Croydon and Sutton
  - MPs: Chris Philp (Conservative); Sarah Jones (Labour); Steve Reed (Labour); Natasha Irons (Labour)

Area
  - Total: 34 sq mi (87 km^{2})
  - Rank: 209th (of 296)

Population (2025)
  - Total: 410,085
  - Rank: 17th (of 296)
  - Density: 12,000/sq mi (4,700/km^{2})
- Time zone: UTC (GMT)
  - Summer (DST): UTC+1 (BST)
- Postcodes: BR, CR, SE, SW
- Area codes: 01689, 01737, 020
- ISO 3166 code: GB-CRY
- ONS code: 00AH
- GSS code: E09000008
- Police: Metropolitan Police
- Website: http://www.croydon.gov.uk/

The London Borough of Croydon is a borough within Outer London. It covers an area of 87 km^{2} (33.6 sq mi) and has a population of 397,741 as of mid-2023, making it one of London's two most populated boroughs (regularly alternating at number one, since 2000, with Barnet). At its centre is the historic town of Croydon, from which the borough takes its name. Other urban centres include Thornton Heath, Coulsdon, Purley, South Norwood, Norbury, New Addington, and Selsdon. Croydon is mentioned in the Domesday Book.

The borough developed from a small market town into what is now a significant business and cultural hub outside central London. Many contributions to entertainment and the arts have helped Croydon gain recognition as a metropolitan centre.

The borough was formed in 1965 from the merger of the County Borough of Croydon with Coulsdon and Purley Urban District (previously in Surrey). The local authority, Croydon London Borough Council, is now part of London Councils, the local government association for Greater London.

One significant factor in the development of Croydon as a business centre was the presence of Croydon Airport, opened in 1920, and once London's primary international airport. It closed on 30 September 1959 due to limited space for expansion. The former lodge to Croydon Airport Terminal is now a Grade II listed building and tourist attraction.

Croydon Council and its predecessor, Croydon Corporation, have applied for city status on multiple occasions, but without success. The area is currently undergoing a major regeneration initiative, Croydon Vision 2020, aimed at attracting more businesses and tourists.

While Croydon is predominantly urban, the borough's southern areas feature suburban and rural landscapes. Since 2003, Croydon has been certified as a Fairtrade borough by the Fairtrade Foundation. It was the first London borough to be awarded Fairtrade status.

The area has a cultural presence in London and South East England and is home to institutions such as the arts and entertainment centre Fairfield Halls. Its famous fringe theatre, the Warehouse Theatre, went into administration in 2012 due to lack of funding and the building was demolished in 2013.

The Croydon Clocktower was opened by Queen Elizabeth II in 1994 as an arts venue featuring a library and a museum. From 2000 to 2010, Croydon staged an annual summer festival celebrating the area's Black and Indian cultural diversity, with audiences reaching more than 50,000 people.

Premier League football club Crystal Palace F.C. has played at Selhurst Park since 1924. Other landmarks in the borough include what remains of Croydon Palace, an important residence of the Archbishops of Canterbury since around the 9th century CE. It was known as 'The Old Palace' during its time as a school. It served as the manor house of the manor of Croydon, held by the Archbishops from the Anglo-Saxon period onwards. Its local successor is Addington Palace, an eighteenth-century mansion that became the official second residence of six archbishops. The borough is also home to the large Shirley Windmill, and to the BRIT School – a creative arts institute that has produced artists such as Adele, Amy Winehouse and Leona Lewis.

== History ==
The name Croydon comes from Crogdene, or Croindone, named by the Saxons in the 8th century when they settled there, although the area had been inhabited since prehistoric times. It is thought to derive from the Anglo-Saxon croeas deanas, meaning "the valley of the crocuses". This may indicate that, like Saffron Walden in Essex, it was a centre for the collection of saffron.

At the time of the Norman invasion, Croydon had a church, a mill and around 365 inhabitants, as recorded in the Domesday Book. The Archbishop of Canterbury, Archbishop Lanfranc lived at Croydon Palace. Visitors included Thomas Becket (another Archbishop), and royal figures such as Henry VIII of England and Elizabeth I. The royal charter for Surrey Street Market dates back to 1276.

Croydon continued as a market town, producing charcoal, tanned leather, and beer. In 1803 Croydon was served by the Surrey Iron Railway, the first public railway (horse-drawn) in the world, and by the London to Brighton rail link in the mid-19th century, helping it to become the largest town in what was then Surrey.

In the 20th century, Croydon became known for industries such as metalworking, car manufacturing and its aerodrome, Croydon Airport. Starting out during World War I as an airfield for protection against Zeppelins, the airport was merged with an adjacent airfield, and the new aerodrome opened on 29 March 1920. It developed into one of the busiest airports in the world during the 1920s and 1930s, and welcomed the world's aviators in its heyday. British Airways Ltd used the airport for a short period after redirecting from Northolt Aerodrome, and Croydon was the operating base for Imperial Airways. It was partly due to the airport that Croydon suffered heavy bomb damage during World War II. As aviation technology progressed and aircraft became larger and more numerous, it was recognised in 1952 that the airport would be too small to cope with the increasing volume of air traffic. The last scheduled flight departed on 30 September 1959. It was superseded as the main airport by both London Heathrow and London Gatwick Airport (see below). The air terminal, now known as Airport House, has been restored and contains a hotel and museum.

In the late 1950s and through the 1960s, the council commercialised the centre of Croydon with massive development of office blocks and the Whitgift Centre, formerly the largest in-town shopping centre in Europe. The centre was officially opened in October 1970 by the Duchess of Kent. The original Whitgift School there had moved to Haling Park, South Croydon in the 1930s; the replacement school on the site, Whitgift Middle School, now the Trinity School of John Whitgift, moved to Shirley Park in the 1960s, when the buildings were demolished.

Croydon was hit by extensive rioting in August 2011 during the England riots. Reeves, a historic furniture store established in 1867 that gave its name to a junction and tram stop in the town centre, was destroyed by arson.

Since a 1999 study by town planning consultants EDAW, Croydon has been the subject of a series of development projects ranging from £200 million to £3.5 billion, called Croydon Vision 2020. The scheme aims to change the urban planning of central Croydon, to make it "London's Third City" and the hub of retail, business, culture and living in both south London and south-east England. The plan was showcased in a series of events called Croydon Expo.

=== Administrative history ===
The area of the modern borough broadly corresponds to the four ancient parishes of Croydon, Addington, Coulsdon and Sanderstead.

The parish of Croydon was governed by improvement commissioners from 1829 until 1849, when it was made a local board district. Croydon was incorporated as a municipal borough in 1883. When elected county councils were established in 1889, Croydon was considered large enough to provide its county-level services. It was therefore made a county borough, independent from the new Surrey County Council, whilst remaining part of Surrey for judicial and lieutenancy purposes. The borough was enlarged in 1928 to absorb the neighbouring parish of Addington.

Coulsdon and Sanderstead were governed as rural parishes within the Croydon Rural District until 1915, when the Coulsdon and Purley Urban District was created covering the two parishes. Purley itself was not a civil parish, being in the parish of Coulsdon, but was included in the urban district's name as it was one of the main built-up settlements in the district. There were subsequent adjustments to the boundaries with neighbouring areas, notably including in 1933, when the urban district absorbed the parish of Farleigh. This meant there were three urban parishes in the district, Coulsdon, Farleigh, and Sanderstead.

The London Borough of Croydon was created on 1 April 1965 under the London Government Act 1963, covering the combined area of the former Coulsdon and Purley Urban District and the County Borough of Croydon, both of which were abolished at the same time. The area was transferred from Surrey to Greater London to become one of the 32 London boroughs. The Farleigh area was removed from the borough in 1969 and transferred back to Surrey, becoming part of the parish of Chelsham and Farleigh.

The borough council has unsuccessfully applied for city status on several occasions: in 1965, 1977, 1992, 2000, 2002 and 2012. At present, the London Borough of Croydon is the second most populous local government district of England without city status. Croydon's applications for city status were refused to avoid the town having a separated identity from the rest of Greater London. In 1965, it was described as "...now just part of the London conurbation and almost indistinguishable from many of the other Greater London boroughs", and in 2000 as having "no particular identity of its own".

== Governance ==
Croydon Council is the local authority for the borough of Croydon. The council holds its meetings at Croydon Town Hall, which is situated on Katherine Street in the centre of Croydon. The council's main administrative offices are located in the adjoining building, Bernard Weatherill House. Since 2022, the council has been led by the directly elected Mayor of Croydon.

=== Greater London representation ===
Since 2000, for elections to the London Assembly, the borough forms part of the Croydon and Sutton constituency. It has been represented by Conservative AM Neil Garratt since May 2021. He is the leader of the Conservative Party in the London Assembly.

=== Westminster representation ===
The borough is covered by four parliamentary constituencies: Streatham and Croydon North, Croydon West, Croydon East and Croydon South. Streatham and Croydon North by Labour MP Steve Reed, Croydon West is represented by Labour MP Sarah Jones, Croydon East is represented by Labour MP Natasha Irons and Croydon South by Conservative MP Chris Philp.

=== Government buildings ===
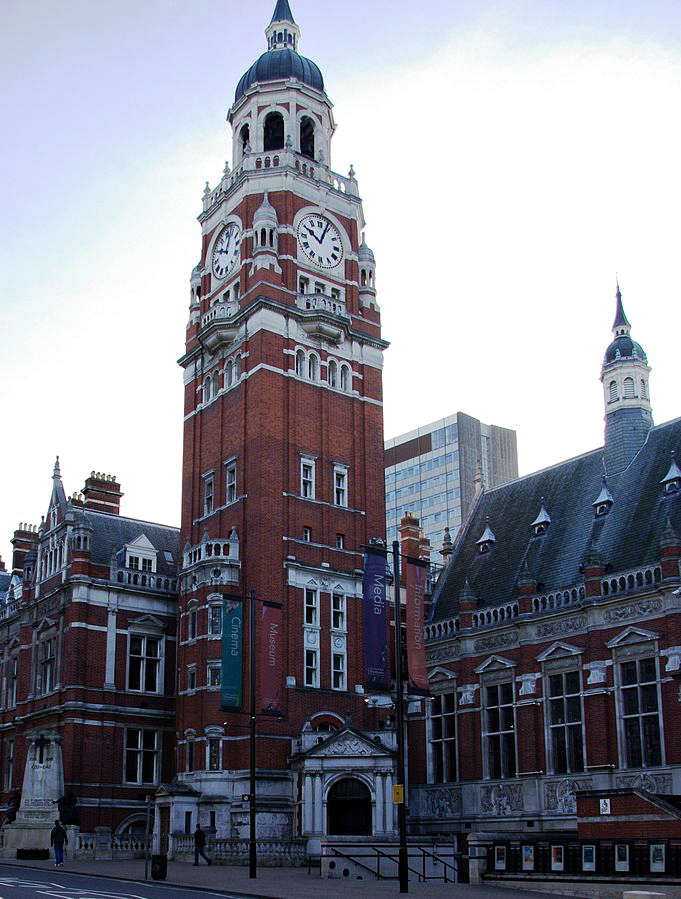
Croydon Town Hall

Croydon Town Hall, on Katharine Street in central Croydon, houses the committee rooms, the mayor's and other councillors' offices, electoral services, and the arts and heritage services. The present Town Hall is Croydon's third. The first town hall is thought to have been built in either 1566 or 1609. The second was built in 1808 to serve the growing town but was demolished after the present town hall was erected in 1895.

The 1808 building cost £8,000, which was regarded as an enormous sum at the time and was perhaps as controversial as the administrative building Bernard Weatherill House. Bernard Weatherill House opened for occupation in 2013 and is reputed to have cost £220,000,000. The early 19th-century building was known initially as "Courthouse" as, like its predecessor and successor, the local court met there. The building stood on the western side of a High Street near the junction with Surrey Street, the location of the town's market. The building became inadequate for the growing local administrative responsibilities and stood at a narrow point of the High Street in need of widening.

The present town hall was designed by local architect Charles Henman and was officially opened by the Prince and Princess of Wales on 19 May 1896. It was constructed in red brick, sourced from Wrotham in Kent, with Portland stone dressings and green Westmoreland slates for the roof. It also housed the court and most central council employees.

The Borough's incorporation in 1883 and a desire to improve central Croydon with improvements to traffic flows and the removal of social deprivation in Middle Row prompted the move to a new configuration of town hall provision. The second closure of the Central Railway Station provided the corporation with the opportunity to buy the station land from the London, Brighton, and South Coast Railway Company for £11,500 to use as the site for the new town hall. Indeed, the council hoped to be able to sell on some of the land purchased with enough for municipal needs and still "leave a considerable margin of land which might be disposed of". The purchase of the failed railway station came despite local leaders having successfully urged the reopening of the poorly patronised railway station. The railway station re-opening had failed to be a success, so the land was freed up for alternative use.

Parts, including the former courtrooms, have been converted into the Museum of Croydon and exhibition galleries. The original public library was converted into the David Lean Cinema, part of the Croydon Clocktower. The Braithwaite Hall is used for events and performances. The town hall was renovated in the mid-1990s, and the imposing central staircase, long closed to the public and kept for councillors only, was reopened in 1994. The civic complex, meanwhile, was added to, with buildings across Mint Walk and the 19-floor Taberner House to house the rapidly expanding corporation's employees.

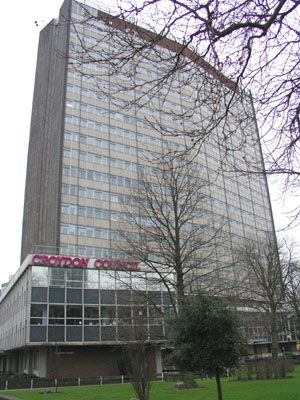
Croydon Council's offices were in Taberner House until September 2013

Ruskin House is the headquarters of Croydon's Labour, Trade Union, and Co-operative movements and is itself a co-operative with shareholders from organisations across the three movements. In the 19th century, Croydon was a bustling commercial centre of London. It was said that, at the turn of the 20th century, approximately £10,000 was spent in Croydon's taverns and inns every week. For the early labour movement, it was natural to meet in the town's public houses in this environment. However, the temperance movement was equally strong, and Georgina King Lewis, a keen member of the Croydon United Temperance Council, took it upon herself to establish a dry centre for the labour movement. The first Ruskin House was highly successful, and there have been two more since. The current house was officially opened in 1967 by the then Labour Prime Minister, Harold Wilson. Today, Ruskin House continues to serve as the headquarters of the Trade Union, Labour, and Co-operative movements in Croydon, hosting a range of meetings and being the base for several labour movement groups. Office tenants include the headquarters of the Communist Party of Britain and Croydon Labour Party. Geraint Davies, MP for Croydon Central 1997–2005, had offices in the building.

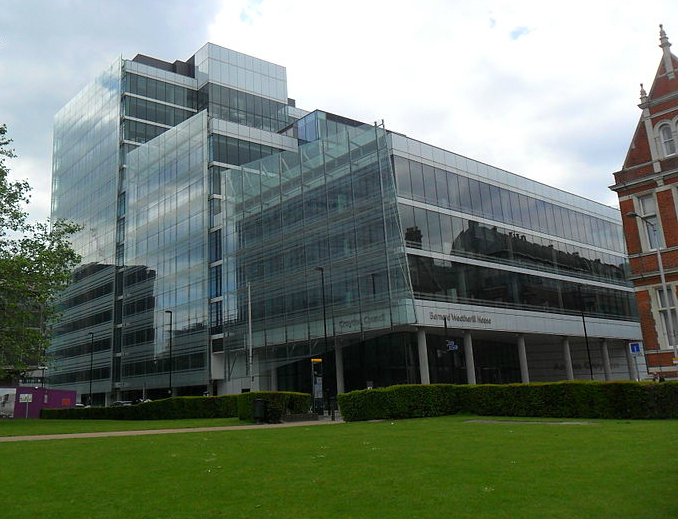
Bernard Weatherill House, home to Croydon Council from September 2013

Taberner House was built between 1964 and 1967, designed by architect H. Thornley, with Allan Holt and Hugh Lea as borough engineers. Although the council had needed extra space since the 1920s, it was only with the imminent creation of the London Borough of Croydon that action was taken. The building, which was demolished in 2014, was in classic 1960s style, praised at the time but subsequently much derided. It has its elegant upper slab block narrowing towards both ends, a formal device that has been compared to the famous Pirelli Tower in Milan. It was named after Ernest Taberner OBE, Town Clerk from 1937 to 1963. Until September 2013, Taberner House housed most of the council's central employees and was the main location for the public to access information and services, particularly concerning housing.

In September 2013, Council staff moved into Bernard Weatherill House in Fell Road (named after the former Speaker of the House and Member of Parliament for Croydon North-East). Staff from the Met Police, NHS, Jobcentre Plus, Croydon Credit Union, Citizens Advice Bureau, and 75 services from the council all moved to the new building.

== Geography and climate ==
The borough is in the far south of London, with the M25 orbital motorway stretching to the south of it, between Croydon and Tandridge. To the north and east, the borough mainly borders the London Borough of Bromley, and in the northwest the boroughs of Lambeth and Southwark. The boroughs of Sutton and Merton are located directly to the west. Croydon is at the head of the River Wandle, just to the north of a significant gap in the North Downs. It lies 10 miles (16 km) south of Central London, and the earliest settlement may have been a Roman staging post on the London-Portslade road, although conclusive evidence has not yet been found. The main town centre houses a great variety of well-known stores in North End and two shopping centres. It was pedestrianised in 1989 to attract people back to the town centre. Another shopping centre called Park Place was due to open in 2012 but has since been scrapped.

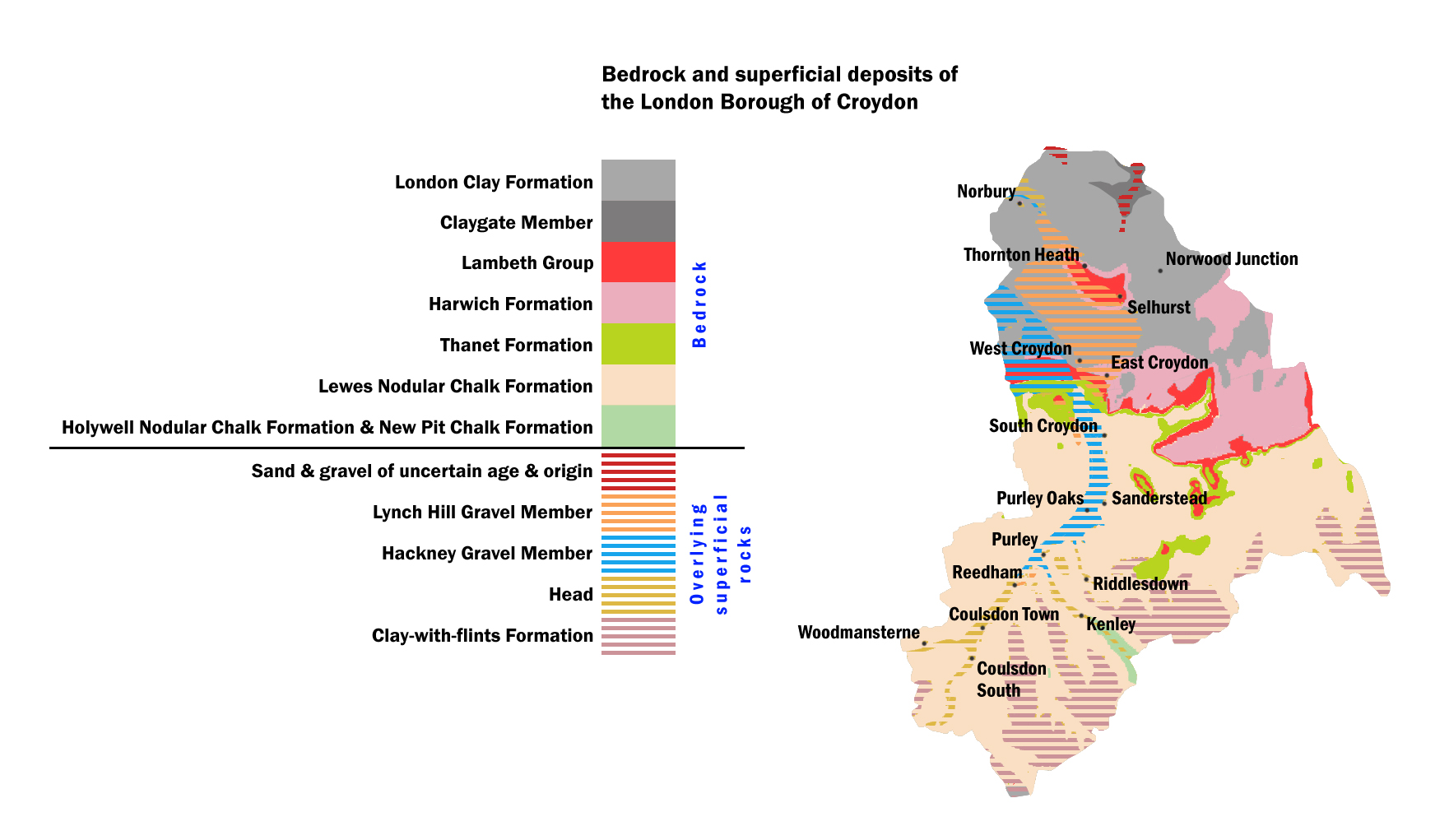
Map of the bedrock and superficial rock at the surface of the borough.

=== Geology ===
The bedrock of the northern part of the borough is mostly London Clay Formation (blue-grey and grey-brown calcareous clay formed between 56 and 47.8 million years ago (mya) during the Palaeogene period) with a Claygate member (dark grey clays with sand laminae and silt) of the same period making up the Norwood Ridge. A band of rocks of the Lambeth Group (clay with sand/gravel/limestone/lignite, laid between 59.2 and 47.8 mya), Harwich Formation (sand and gravel with glauconite, laid between 56 and 47.8 mya) and Thanet Formation (silty, fine-grained sand with glauconite, laid between 59.2 and 56 mya) crosses the borough from east to west under Waddon, Addiscombe and Shirley into Spring Park. In the south, most of the bedrock is of the Lewes Nodular/Seaford Chalk/Newhaven Chalk Formation (laid during the Cretaceous period, between 93.9 and 72.1 mya), from South Croydon and Addington down past Kenley and King's Wood with a small area of Holywell Nodular/New Pit Chalk Formation (also Cretaceous, laid between 100.5 and 89.8 mya) in lower areas between hills, beginning just east of Kenley station and followed by the railway line curving southwards.

There are five types of overlying superficial rock, all of the Quaternary period. In the very north, an unnamed sand-and-gravel member of the Quaternary period overlies the Claygate member of the Norwood Ridge along Church Road and Crystal Palace Parade, with another area along Crown Lane to the east. An area of Lynch Hill Gravel (deposited between 362 and 126 thousand years ago (tya)) extends from Norbury down to under West Croydon and East Croydon stations. A narrow Hackney Gravel Member (laid between 362 and 126 tya) curves down through lower elevations from the west of Norbury and broadly followed by the railway line from South Croydon to south of Purley Station. Extending from this and other lower elevation areas are narrower deposits of Head (poorly sorted and stratified angular rock debris and slow glacial hillwash, deposited between 2.588 mya and the present), related to the downward movement of water, e.g. under Coulsdon Town, Coulsdon South and Kenley stations and by Riddlesdown and Whyteleafe stations. Higher chalk areas in the south are overlain with Clay-with-flints Formation (orange- or red-brown clay with nodules of flint, laid between 23.03 mya and 11.8 tya), e.g. at Netherne-on-the-Hill, Old Coulsdon and Kenley.

Elevations range from 32 metres in the north on London Clay (west of London Road (A23) south-southeast of Norbury Station and west of Thornton Heath station) to 175 metres in the south on a small area of Lambeth Group rock (at Sanderstead Plantation on Addington Road).

=== Townscape description ===
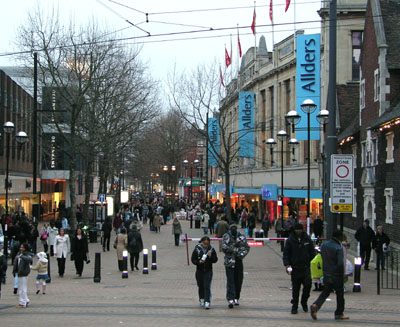
North End shopping street photographed in 2005, after pedestrianisation

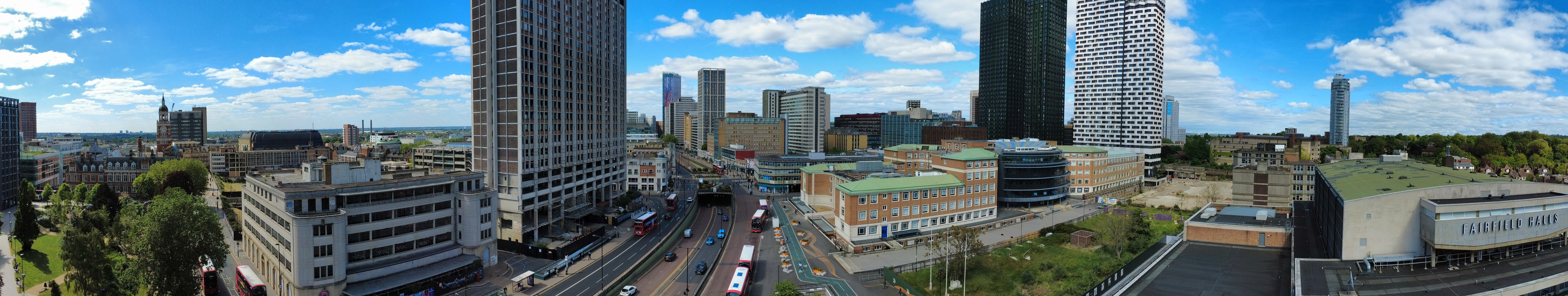
Panorama from the Fairfields Hall in 2025.

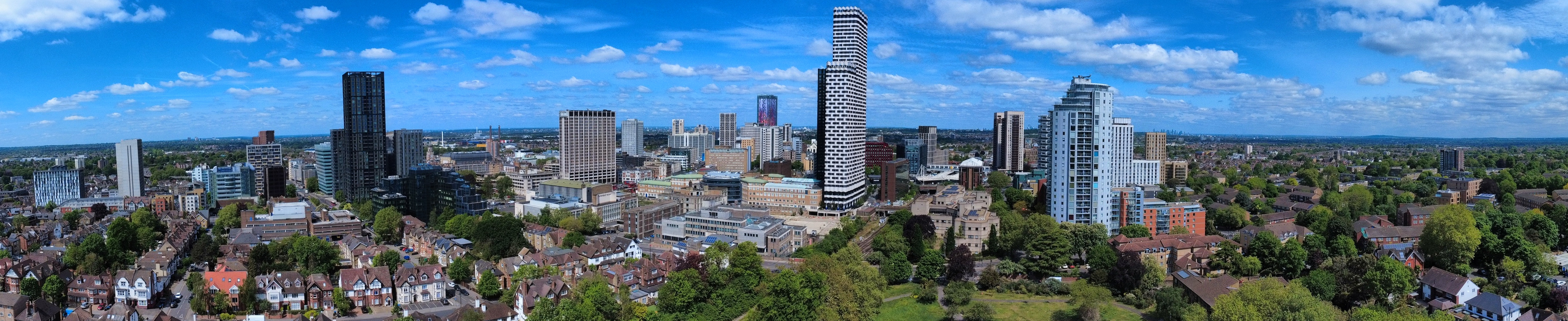
Panorama from Park Hill Park in 2025.

The CR postcode area covers most of the south and centre of the borough while the SE and SW postcodes cover the northern parts, including Crystal Palace, Upper Norwood, South Norwood, Selhurst (part), Thornton Heath (part), Norbury and Pollards Hill (part).

Districts in the London Borough of Croydon include Addington, a village to the east of Croydon which until 2000 was poorly linked to the rest of the borough as it was without any railway or light rail stations, with only a few patchy bus services. Addiscombe is a district just northeast of the centre of Croydon, and is popular with commuters to central London as it is close to the busy East Croydon station. Ashburton, to the northeast of Croydon, is mostly home to residential houses and flats, being named after Ashburton House, one of the three big houses in the Addiscombe area. Broad Green is a small district, centred on a large green with many homes and local shops in West Croydon. Coombe is an area, just east of Croydon, which has barely been urbanised and has retained its collection of large houses fairly intact. Coulsdon, south-west of Central Croydon, has retained a good mix of traditional high street shops as well as a large number of restaurants for its size. Croydon is the principal area of the borough, Crystal Palace is an area north of Croydon, which is shared with the London Boroughs of Lambeth, Southwark, Lewisham and Bromley. Fairfield, just northeast of Croydon, holds the Fairfield Halls and the village of Forestdale, to the east of Croydon's main area, commenced work in the late 1960s and completed in the mid-70s to create a larger town on what was previously open ground. Hamsey Green is a place on the plateau of the North Downs, south of Croydon. Kenley, again south of the centre, lies within the London Green Belt and features a landscape dominated by green space. New Addington, to the east, is a large local council estate surrounded by open countryside and golf courses. Norbury, to the northwest, is a suburb with a large ethnic population. Norwood New Town is a part of the Norwood triangle, to the north of Croydon. Monks Orchard is a small district made up of large houses and open space in the northeast of the borough. Pollards Hill is a residential district with houses on roads, which are lined with pollarded lime trees, stretching to Norbury. Purley, to the south, is a main town whose name derives from "pirlea", which means 'Peartree lea'. Sanderstead, to the south, is a village mainly on high ground at the edge of suburban development in Greater London. Selhurst is a town, to the north of Croydon, which holds the nationally known school, The BRIT School. Selsdon is a suburb that was developed during the inter-war period in the 1920s and 1930s. It is notable for its many Art Deco houses, which are located to the southeast of Croydon Centre. Shirley, is to the east of Croydon, and holds Shirley Windmill. South Croydon, to the south of Croydon, is a locality which holds local landmarks such as The Swan and Sugarloaf public house and independent Whitgift School, part of the Whitgift Foundation. South Norwood, to the north, is in common with West Norwood and Upper Norwood, named after a contraction of Great North Wood and has a population of around 14,590. Thornton Heath is a town, to the northwest of Croydon, which holds Croydon's principal hospital Mayday. Upper Norwood is north of Croydon, on a mainly elevated area of the borough. Waddon is a residential area, mainly based on the Purley Way retail area, to the west of the borough. Woodside is located to the northeast of the borough, with streets based on Woodside Green, a small area of grass. And finally Whyteleafe is a town, right to the edge of Croydon with some areas in the Surrey district of Tandridge.

Croydon is a gateway to the south from central London, with some major roads running through it. Purley Way, part of the A23, was built to by-pass Croydon town centre. It is one of the busiest roads in the borough and is the site of several major retail developments, including one of only 18 IKEA stores in the country, built on the site of the former power station. The A23 continues southward as Brighton Road, which is the main route running towards the south from Croydon to Purley. The centre of Croydon is very congested, and the urban planning has since become out of date and quite inadequate, due to the expansion of Croydon's main shopping area and office blocks. Wellesley Road is a north–south dual carriageway that cuts through the centre of the town, and makes it hard to walk between the town centre's two railway stations. Croydon Vision 2020 includes a plan for a more pedestrian-friendly replacement. It has also been named as one of the worst roads for cyclists in the area. Construction of the Croydon Underpass beneath the junction of George Street and Wellesley Road/Park Lane started in the early 1960s, mainly to alleviate traffic congestion on Park Lane, above the underpass. The Croydon Flyover is also near the underpass, and next to Taberner House. It mainly leads traffic onto Duppas Hill, towards Purley Way, with links to Sutton and Kingston upon Thames.

=== Topography and climate ===
Croydon

Climate chart (precipitation, max. and min. temperature)
J	F	M	A	M	J	J	A	S	O	N	D
52 8 2	34 8 2	42 11 4	45 13 5	47 17 8	53 20 11	38 23 14	47 23 13	57 19 11	62 15 8	52 11 5	54 9 3
- █ Average max. and min. temperatures in °C
- █ Precipitation totals in mm
- Source: Met Office
Imperial conversion
J	F	M	A	M	J	J	A	S	O	N	D
2 46 36	1.3 46 36	1.7 52 39	1.8 55 41	1.9 63 46	2.1 68 52	1.5 73 57	1.9 73 55	2.2 66 52	2.4 59 46	2 52 41	2.1 48 37
- █ Average max. and min. temperatures in °F
- █ Precipitation totals in inches

Croydon covers an area of 86.52 km^{2}. Croydon's physical features consist of many hills and rivers spread out across the borough and into the North Downs, Surrey, and the rest of south London. Addington Hills is a major hilly area to the south of London and is recognised as a significant obstacle to the growth of London from its origins as a port on the north side of the river, to a large circular city. The Great North Wood is a former natural oak forest that covered the Sydenham Ridge and the southern reaches of the River Effra and its tributaries.

The most notable tree, called Vicar's Oak, marked the boundary of four ancient parishes: Lambeth, Camberwell, Croydon and Bromley. John Aubrey referred to this "ancient remarkable tree" in the past tense as early as 1718, but according to J. B. Wilson, the Vicar's Oak survived until 1825. The River Wandle, a chalk stream, is also a major tributary of the River Thames, flowing to Wandsworth and Putney for 9 miles (14 km) from its main source in Waddon.

Croydon has a temperate climate, in common with most areas of Great Britain: its Köppen climate classification is Cfb. Its mean annual temperature of 9.6 °C is similar to that experienced throughout the Weald, and slightly cooler than nearby areas such as the Sussex coast and central London. Rainfall is considerably below England's average (1971–2000) level of 838 mm, and every month is drier overall than the England average.

=== Architecture ===
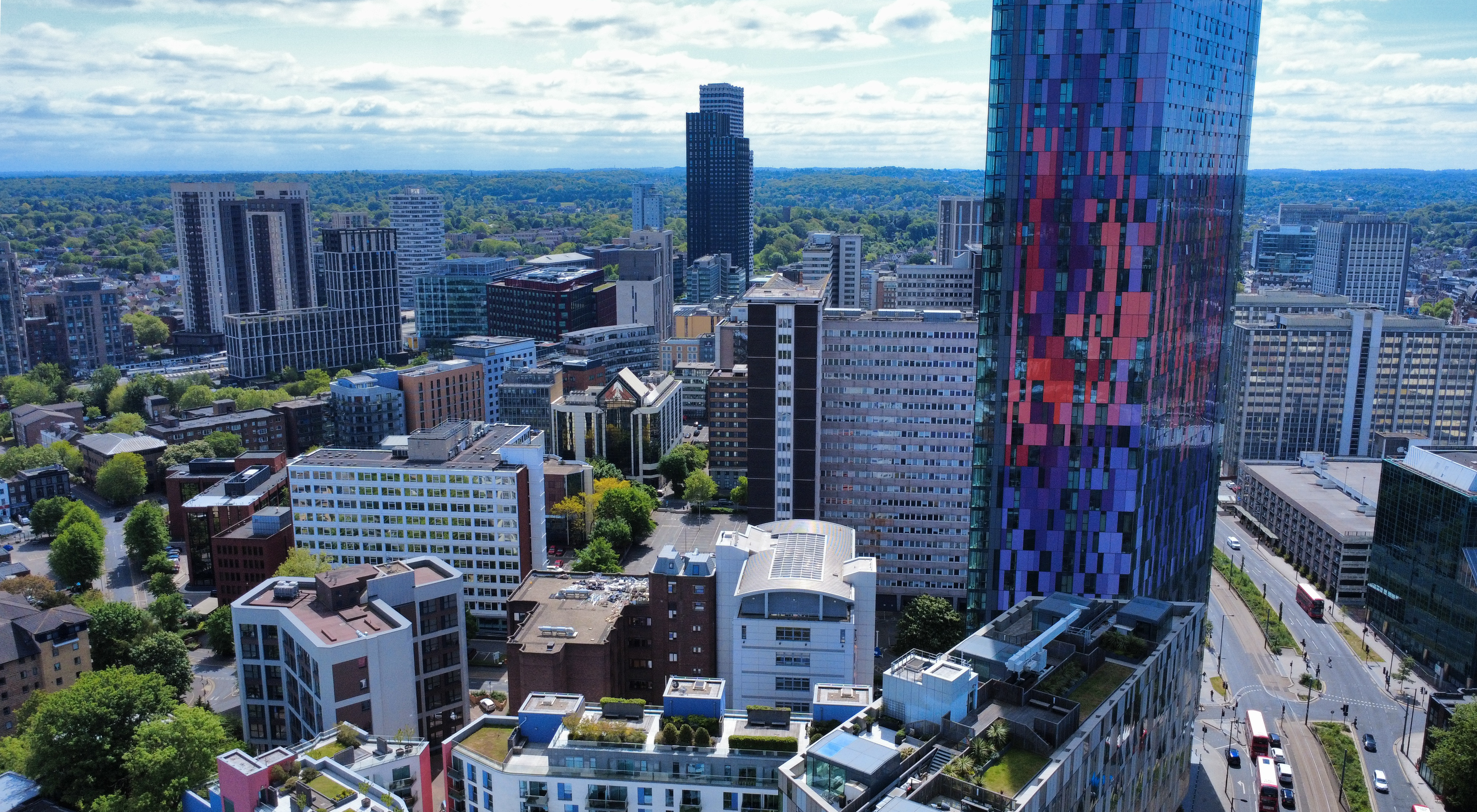
Croydon from Wellesley Road in 2025. The Saffron Square development is in the foreground and the recent modular residential towers central in the distance.

Croydon's skyline has significantly changed over the past 50 years. High-rise buildings, mainly office blocks, now dominate the skyline. The most notable of these buildings include Croydon Council's former headquarters Taberner House, which has been compared to the famous Pirelli Tower of Milan, and the Nestlé Tower, the former UK headquarters of Nestlé.

In recent years, the development of tall buildings, such as the approved Croydon Vocational Tower and Wellesley Square, has been encouraged in the London Plan, and will lead to the erection of new skyscrapers in the coming years as part of London's high-rise boom.

No. 1 Croydon, formerly the NLA Tower, Britain's 88th tallest tower, close to East Croydon station, is an example of 1970s architecture. The tower was originally nicknamed the Threepenny bit building, as it resembles a stack of pre-decimalisation Threepence coins, which were 12-sided. It is now most commonly called The Octagon, being 8-sided.

Lunar House is another high-rise building. Like other government office buildings on Wellesley Road, such as Apollo House, the name of the building was inspired by the US Moon landings (In the Croydon suburb of New Addington there is a public house, built during the same period, called The Man on the Moon). Lunar House houses the Home Office building for Visas and Immigration. Apollo House is home to the Border Patrol Agency.

A new generation of buildings is being considered by the council as part of Croydon Vision 2020, so that the borough does not lose its title of having the "largest office space in the south east", excluding central London. Projects such as Wellesley Square, which will be a mix of residential and retail with an eye-catching colour design, and 100 George Street — a proposed modern office block — are included in this vision.

Notable events that have happened to Croydon's skyline include the Millennium project to create the largest single urban lighting project ever. It was created to illuminate the buildings of Croydon for the third millennium. The project provided new lighting and offered the ability to project images and words onto buildings, mixing art and poetry with coloured light, and also displaying public information after dark. Apart from increasing night-time activity in Croydon and thereby reducing the fear of crime, it helped to promote the sustainable use of older buildings by displaying them in a more positive way.

=== Landmarks ===
There are numerous attractions and places of interest across the borough of Croydon, ranging from historic sites in the north and south to modern towers in the centre.

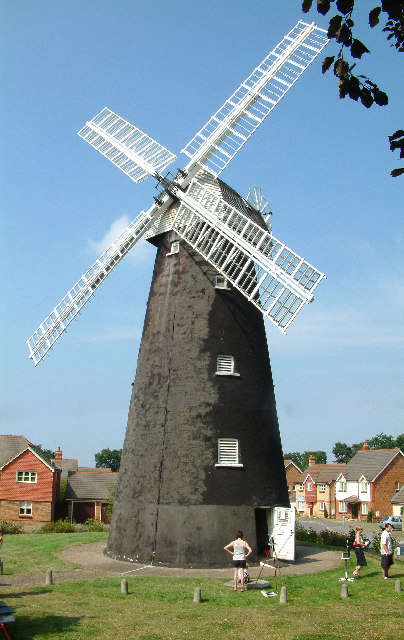
Shirley Windmill

Croydon Airport was once London's main airport but closed on 30 September 1959 due to the expansion of London and a lack of room for expansion. Heathrow International Airport took over as London's main airport. Croydon Airport has now been mostly converted to offices, although some important elements of the airport remain. It is a tourist attraction.

The Croydon Clocktower arts venue was opened by Elizabeth II in 1994. It includes the Braithwaite Hall (the former reference library – named after the Rev. Braithwaite who donated it to the town) for live events, the David Lean Cinema (built in memory of David Lean), the Museum of Croydon and Croydon Central Library. The Museum of Croydon (formerly known as Croydon Lifetimes Museum) highlights Croydon's past and present and currently features high-profile exhibitions including the Riesco Collection, The Art of Dr Seuss, and the Whatever the Weather gallery. Shirley Windmill is a working windmill and one of the few surviving large windmills in Surrey, built in 1854. It is Grade II listed and received a £218,100 grant from the Heritage Lottery Fund. Addington Palace is an 18th-century mansion in Addington that was originally built as Addington Place in the 16th century. The palace became the official second residence of six archbishops, five of whom are buried in St Mary's Church and the churchyard nearby.

North End is the main pedestrianised shopping road in Croydon, having Centrale to one side and the Whitgift Centre to the other. The Warehouse Theatre is a popular theatre for mostly young performers and was due to get a facelift on the Croydon Gateway site.

The Nestlé Tower was the UK headquarters of Nestlé and is one of the tallest towers in England, which is due to be re-fitted during the Park Place development. Fairfield Halls, a well-known concert venue and exhibition centre, opened in 1962. It is frequently used for BBC recordings and was formerly the home of ITV's World of Sport. It includes the Ashcroft Theatre and the Arnhem Gallery.

Croydon Palace was the summer residence of the Archbishop of Canterbury for over 500 years and included regular visitors such as Henry III and Queen Elizabeth I. It is thought to have been built around 960. Croydon Cemetery is a large cemetery and crematorium west of Croydon and is most famous for the gravestone of Derek Bentley, who was wrongly hanged in 1953. Mitcham Common is an area of common land partly shared with the boroughs of Sutton and Merton. Almost 500,000 years ago, Mitcham Common formed part of the river bed of the River Thames.

The BRIT School is a performing Arts & Technology school, owned by the BRIT Trust (known for the BRIT Awards Music Ceremony). Famous former students include Kellie Shirley, Amy Winehouse, Leona Lewis, Adele, Kate Nash, Dane Bowers, Katie Melua and Lyndon David-Hall. Grants is an entertainment venue in the centre of Croydon which includes a Vue cinema.

Surrey Street Market has roots in the 13th century, or earlier, and was chartered by the Archbishop of Canterbury in 1276. The market is regularly used as a location for TV, film, and advertising. Croydon Minster, formerly the parish church, was established in the Anglo-Saxon period, and parts of the surviving building (notably the tower) date from the 14th and 15th centuries. However, the church was largely destroyed by fire in 1867, so the present structure is a rebuild of 1867–69 to the designs of George Gilbert Scott. It still contains several important monuments and fittings saved from the old church.

== Demography ==
Population pyramid of the Borough of Croydon

According to the 2011 census, Croydon had a population of 363,378, making it the most populated borough in Greater London. The estimated population in 2017 was around 384,800. 186,900 were males, with 197,900 females. The density was 4,448 inhabitants per km^{2}. 248,200 residents of Croydon were between the age of 16 and 64.

=== Population change ===
The table shows population change since 1801, including the percentage change since the previous census. Although the London Borough of Croydon has existed only since 1965, earlier figures have been generated by combining data from the towns, villages, and civil parishes that would later be absorbed into the authority.

Population
Year	Pop.	±%
1801	6,742	—
1811	8,911	+32.2%
1821	10,567	+18.6%
1831	14,031	+32.8%
1841	18,638	+32.8%
1851	21,849	+17.2%
1861	42,197	+93.1%
1871	62,545	+48.2%
1881	82,893	+32.5%
1891	108,339	+30.7%
1901	141,918	+31.0%
1911	185,914	+31.0%
1921	221,692	+19.2%
1931	264,358	+19.2%
1941	281,273	+6.4%
1951	299,271	+6.4%
1961	316,084	+5.6%
1971	333,942	+5.6%
1981	316,296	−5.3%
1991	319,218	+0.9%
2001	330,688	+3.6%
2011	363,378	+9.9%
2021	390,719	+7.5%
2024 estimate	409,342	+4.8%
Source: A Vision of Britain through time 2024 estimate

=== Housing ===
The most common householder type was owner occupied with only a small percentage rented. Many new housing schemes and developments are currently taking place in Croydon, such as The Exchange and Bridge House, IYLO, Wellesley Square (now known as Saffron Square) and Altitude 25.

=== Crime ===
In 2006, The Metropolitan Police recorded a 10% fall in the number of crimes committed in Croydon, better than the rate at which crime in London as a whole is falling. Croydon has had the highest fall in the number of cases of violence against the person in south London, and is one of the top 10 safest local authorities in London. According to Your Croydon (a local community magazine) this is due to a stronger partnership between Croydon Council and the police. In 2007, overall crime figures across the borough saw a decrease of 5%, with the number of incidents dropping from 32,506 in 2006 to 30,862 in 2007. However, in the year ending April 2012, The Metropolitan Police recorded the highest rates for murder and rape throughout London in Croydon, accounting for almost 10% of all murders, and 7% of all rapes.

=== Ethnicity ===
In 2011, white was the majority ethnicity with 55.1%. Black was the second-largest ethnicity with 20.2%; 16.4% were Asian and 8.3% stated to be something other.

Ethnic Group	Year											
Ethnic Group	1971 estimations		1981 estimations		1991 census		2001 census		2011 census		2021 census	
Ethnic Group	Number	%	Number	%	Number	%	Number	%	Number	%	Number	%
White: Total	–	93.9%	286,146	89.3%	262,342	82.2%	231,945	70.2%	200,195	55.1%	188,985	48.4%
White: British	–	–	–	–	–	–	210,573	63.7%	171,740	47.3%	146,268	37.4%
White: Irish	–	–	–	–	–	–	7,130	2.2%	5,369	1.5%	4,935	1.3%
White: Gypsy or Irish Traveller	–	–	–	–	–	–	–	–	234	0.1%	212	0.1%
White: Roma	–	–	–	–	–	–	–	–	–	–	1,120	0.3%
White: Other	–	–	–	–	–	–	14,242	4.3%	22,852	6.3%	36,450	9.3%
Black or Black British: Total	–	–	15,352	4.8%	24,443	7.7%	44,076	13.3%	73,256	20.2%	88,441	22.6%
Black or Black British: African	–	–	2,933		5,099		14,627	4.4%	28,981	8.0%	40,219	10.3%
Black or Black British: Caribbean	–	–	10,030		15,801		26,065	7.9%	31,320	8.6%	36,108	9.2%
Black or Black British: Other Black	–	–	2,389		3,543		3,384	1.0%	12,955	3.6%	12,114	3.1%
Asian or Asian British: Total	–	–	14,874	4.6%	26,188	8.2%	37,380	11.3%	59,627	16.4%	68,487	17.5%
Asian or Asian British: Indian	–	–	9,080		15,191		21,246	6.4%	24,660	6.8%	29,563	7.6%
Asian or Asian British: Pakistani	–	–	2,156		3,518		7,429	2.2%	10,865	3.0%	15,345	3.9%
Asian or Asian British: Bangladeshi	–	–	394		817		1,765	0.5%	2,570	0.7%	3,549	0.9%
Asian or Asian British: Chinese	–	–	997		1,748		2,212	0.7%	3,925	1.1%	3,950	1.0%
Asian or Asian British: Other Asian	–	–	2,247		4,914		6,940	2.1%	17,607	4.8%	16,080	4.1%
Mixed or British Mixed: Total	–	–	–	–	–	–	12,296	3.7%	23,895	6.6%	29,745	7.6%
Mixed: White and Black Caribbean	–	–	–	–	–	–	4,721	1.4%	9,650	2.7%	10,380	2.7%
Mixed: White and Black African	–	–	–	–	–	–	1,352	0.4%	3,279	0.9%	4,453	1.1%
Mixed: White and Asian	–	–	–	–	–	–	3,480	1.1%	5,140	1.4%	5,740	1.5%
Mixed: Other Mixed	–	–	–	–	–	–	2,743	0.8%	5,826	1.6%	9,172	2.3%
Other: Total	–	–	3,935		6,227		2,678	0.8%	6,405	1.8%	15,066	3.9%
Other: Arab	–	–	–	–	–	–	–	–	1,701	0.5%	2,259	0.6%
Other: Any other ethnic group	–	–	–	–	–	–	–	–	4,704	1.3%	12,807	3.3%
Ethnic minority: Total	–	6.1%	34,161	10.7%	56,858	17.8%	98,642	29.8%	163,183	44.9%	201,739	51.6%
Total	–	100%	320,307	100%	319,200	100%	330,587	100.00%	363,378	100.00%	390,724	100%

=== Religion ===
Religion	2021	
Religion	Number	%
Christian	190,880	48,85%
Muslim	40,717	10,42%
Hindu	23,145	5,92%
Buddhist	2,371	0,61%
Sikh	1,654	0,42%
Jewish	609	0,16%
Other religion	3,189	0,82%
No religion	101,119	25,88%
Religion not stated	27,035	6,92%
Total	390,719	100%

The predominant religion of the borough is Christianity. According to the 2021 United Kingdom census, the borough has over 190,880 Christians, mainly Protestants. This is the largest religious following in the borough, followed by Islam with 40,717 Muslims resident.

101,119 Croydon residents stated that they are atheist or non-religious in the 2021 Census.

Croydon Minster is the most notable of the borough's 35 churches. This church was founded in Saxon times, since there is a record of "a priest of Croydon" in 960, although the first record of a church building is in the Domesday Book (1086). In its final medieval form, the church was mainly a Perpendicular-style structure. It was severely damaged by fire in 1867, following which only the tower, south porch, and outer walls remained. Under the direction of Sir George Gilbert Scott, the church was rebuilt, incorporating the remains and essentially following the design of the medieval building, and was reconsecrated in 1870. It still contains several important monuments and fittings saved from the old church.

The Bishop of Croydon is a position as a suffragan Bishop in the Anglican Diocese of Southwark. The present bishop is the Right Reverend Rosemarie Mallett.

=== Immigration ===
This list includes top-15 sources of immigration to Borough of Croydon for 2021 census:

#	Country	Number
1	India	14,374
2	Jamaica	9,397
3	Poland	7,979
4	Ghana	7,244
5	Pakistan	6,960
6	Nigeria	6,185
7	Sri Lanka	5,165
8	Romania	4,860
9	Italy	3,268
10	Ireland	3,164
11	Portugal	3,104
12	Kenya	3,088
13	Uganda	2,328
14	Bulgaria	2,214
15	Brazil	2,186

== Economy ==
Labour profile in 2023
Employment sectors	Numbers
Total employee jobs	126,000
Full-time	85,000
Part-time	41,000
Wholesale and Retail trade	19,000
Health and Social Work	19,000
Public Administration and Defense	15,000
Administration and Support	11,000
Professional, Scientific, and Technical Activities	11,000
Construction	7,000
Manufacturing	3,000
Other	41,000

=== Retail ===
The main employment sectors are retail and enterprise. There are two major shopping districts in Croydon: Croydon town centre and the Purley Way shopping district. Both are home to many large retail outlets.

- Croydon town centre has been a major retail centre with high street and designer boutiques. Its main shopping areas are on the North End precinct, in the Whitgift Centre, Centrale and St George's Walk. Surrey Street Market is Croydon's historic town centre market, with a royal charter dating from 1276. There has recently been much redevelopment in Croydon town centre.
- Shopping precincts in the Purley Way area include the Valley Park retail complex, Croydon Colonnades, Croydon Fiveways, and the Waddon Goods Park.

In 2005, Croydon was ranked 21st in Britain and second in Greater London in terms of retail expenditure, at £909 million. The expansion in 2006 of the 23,000 m^{2} (250,000 sq ft) IKEA store built in 1992 on a former Croydon power station site, off Purley Way, made it the fifth largest employer in Croydon at the time. By 2010, after the Great Recession from the 2008 financial crisis, Croydon had fallen to sixth in Greater London and 29th in Britain in retail spend.

Widespread economic restructuring predating the COVID-19 pandemic, combined with changes in working and purchasing behaviours brought about by the pandemic itself, have contributed to a retail decline. The Allders in North End, formerly the third largest department store in Britain, closed in 2013 followed by the town centre Debenhams store in 2020, leaving only the House of Fraser department store in Centrale. In line with the wider national trend, retail vacancies have increased. Protracted delays to the refurbishment and redevelopment plans for the Centrale and Whitgift Centre retail complexes also contributed to increased retail vacancy and a decrease in foot traffic. Croydon Council declared bankruptcy by a section 114 notice in December 2020, but was bailed out with a £120 million central government loan.

=== Offices and factories ===
Croydon is a major office area, and one of the largest in SE England outside central London. In the early 2000s many large global companies had European or British headquarters in the town. American International Group (AIG) and the Institute of Public Finance had offices in No. 1 Croydon before moving to Fenchurch Street in central London. Until it moved to Gatwick in 2012, the Swiss company Nestlé had its UK headquarters in St George's House, still known as Nestlé Tower. The pharmaceutical testing company Real Digital International operate from a 6,500 m^{2} (70,000 sq ft) factory on Purley Way, built in 2006.

Virgin Media has offices at Communications House, from its beginnings in 1984 as Croydon Cable, later renamed Telewest. The Home Office UK Visas and Immigration department has its headquarters in Lunar House in Central Croydon.

== Transport ==
=== Rail ===
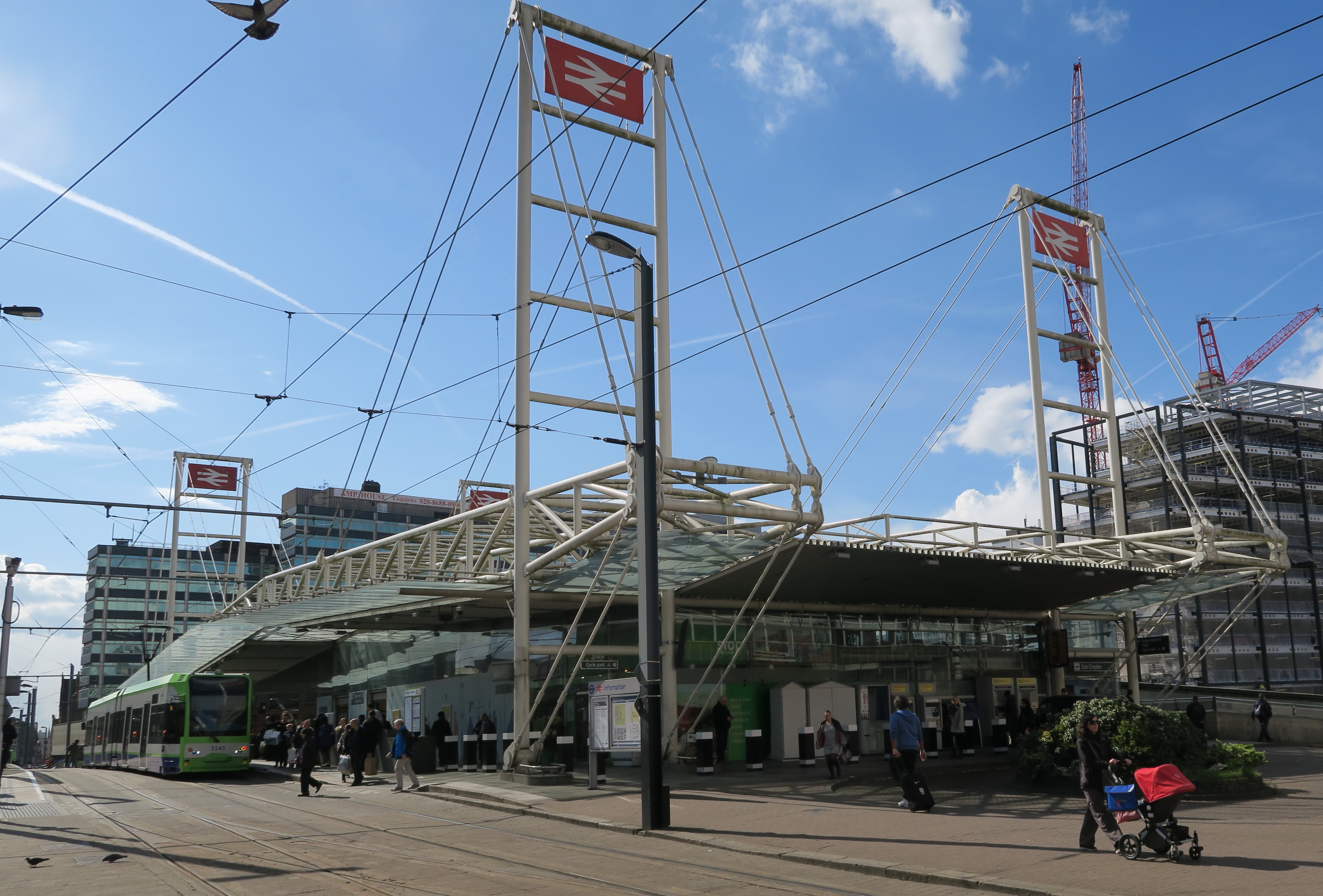
East Croydon railway station

East Croydon and West Croydon are the main stations in the borough. South Croydon railway station is smaller.

East Croydon is the largest and busiest station in Croydon and the third busiest in Greater London, excluding London fare zone 1. It is served by several routes, including Greater Thameslink Railway, operating under the Southern and Thameslink brands. Their trains travel via the Brighton Main Line north to London Victoria, London Bridge, London St Pancras, Luton Airport, Bedford, Cambridge and Peterborough and south to Gatwick Airport, Ore, Brighton, Littlehampton, Bognor Regis, Southampton and Portsmouth.

East Croydon was also served by long-distance Arriva CrossCountry services to Birmingham and the North of England until they were withdrawn in December 2008.

West Croydon is served by London Overground and Southern services north to Highbury & Islington, London Bridge and London Victoria, and south to Sutton and Epsom Downs.

South Croydon is mainly served by Network Rail services operated by Southern for suburban lines to and from London Bridge, London Victoria and the eastern part of Surrey.

Croydon is one of only five London Boroughs not to have at least one London Underground station within its boundaries, with the closest tube station being Morden.

=== Tram ===
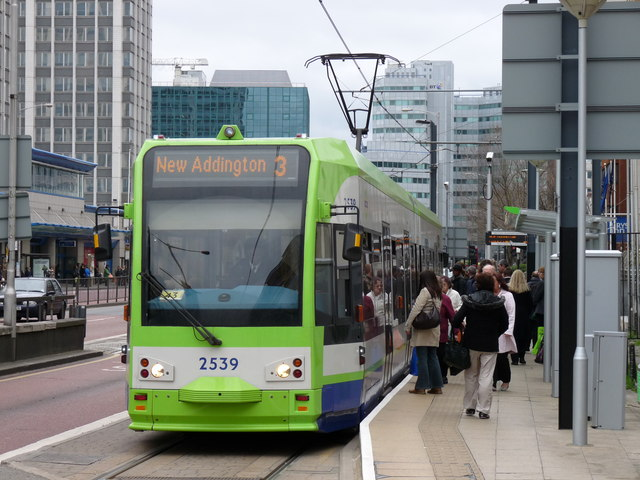
A tram at Wellesley Road tram stop

The Tramlink light rail system opened in 2000, serving the borough and surrounding areas. Its network consists of three lines, from Elmers End to West Croydon, from Beckenham to West Croydon, and from New Addington to Wimbledon, with all three lines running via the Croydon loop on which it is centred. It is also the only tram system in London, but there is another light rail system, the Docklands Light Railway. Tramlink serves Mitcham, Woodside, Addiscombe and the Purley Way retail and industrial area amongst others.

=== Bus ===
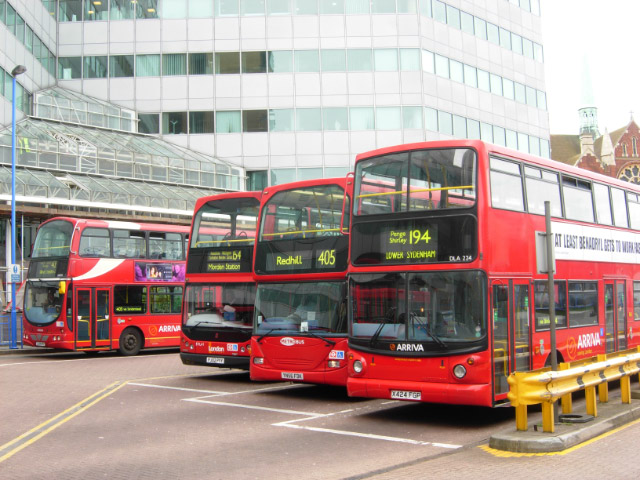
The now demolished West Croydon bus station in June 2007

A sizeable bus infrastructure which is part of the London Buses network operates from a hub at West Croydon bus station. The original bus station opened in May 1985, closing in October 2014. A new bus station opened in October 2016.

Addington Village Interchange is a regional bus terminal in Addington Village which has an interchange between Tramlink and bus services. Services are operated under contract by Arriva London, London Central, Metrobus, Quality Line, Selkent and Transport UK London Bus.

=== Road ===
Croydon is linked to the national motorway network via the M23 and the M25 orbital motorway. The M25 skirts the south of the borough, linking Croydon with other parts of London and the surrounding counties; the M23 branches from the M25 close to Coulsdon, linking the town with the south coast, Crawley, Reigate, and Gatwick Airport. The A23 connects the borough with the motorways. The A23 is the major trunk road through Croydon, linking it with central London, East Sussex, Horsham, and Littlehaven. The old London to Brighton Road passes through the west of the borough on Purley Way, bypassing the commercial centre of Croydon through which it once passed.

The A22 and A23 are the major trunk roads through Croydon. These both run north–south, and come together at Purley. The A22 starts at Purley and connects to East Grinstead, Tunbridge Wells, Uckfield, and Eastbourne. Other major roads generally radiate spoke-like from the town centre. The A23 road cuts right through Croydon: it starts from London and links to Brighton and Gatwick Airport. It attempts to carry a great deal of traffic on what is in places a narrow road with many busy junctions. Wellesley Road is an urban dual carriageway which cuts through the middle of the central business district. It was constructed in the 1960s as part of a planned ring road for Croydon and includes an underpass, which allows traffic to avoid part of the town centre.

=== Air ===
The closest international airport to Croydon is Gatwick Airport, which is located 19 miles (31 km) from the town centre. Gatwick Airport opened in August 1930 as an aerodrome and is a major international operational base for British Airways, EasyJet and Virgin Atlantic. It currently handles around 35 million passengers a year, making it London's second largest airport, and the second busiest airport in the United Kingdom after Heathrow. Heathrow, London City and Luton airports all lie within a two-hour drive of Croydon. Gatwick and Luton Airports are connected to Croydon by frequent direct trains, while Heathrow is accessible by the route SL7 bus.

=== Cycling ===
Although hilly, Croydon is compact and has few major trunk roads running through it. It is on one of the Connect2 schemes which are part of the National Cycle Network route running around Croydon. The North Downs, an area of outstanding natural beauty popular with both on- and off-road cyclists, is so close to Croydon that part of the park lies within the borough boundary, and there are routes into the park almost from the civic centre.

=== Travel to work ===
Below is a table listing transport methods as used by residents aged 16 to 74 according to a 2011 survey.

Mode of transport	Share of residents (%)
National Rail	59.5
Personal vehicle (as driver)	20.2
Bus/minibus/coach	7.5
Walking	5.1
Metro Rail	4.3
Personal vehicle (as passenger)	1.5
Work from home	2.9

(Respondents could only pick one mode, specified as the journey's longest part by distance.)

== Public services ==
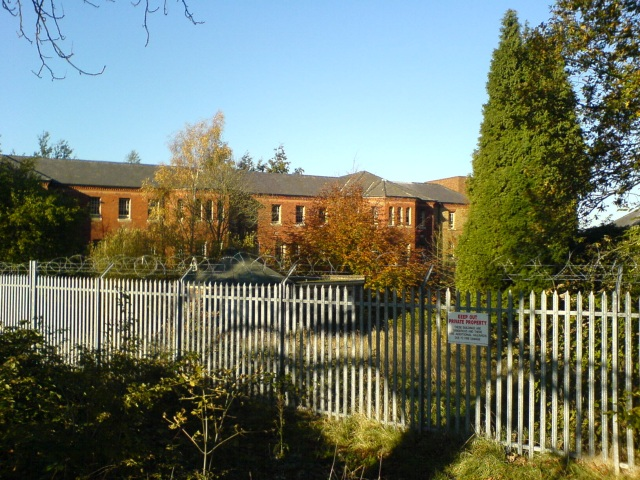
Cane Hill

Home Office policing in Croydon is provided by the Metropolitan Police. The force's Croydon arm has its head offices for policing on Park Lane next to the Fairfield Halls and Croydon College in central Croydon. Public transport is coordinated by Transport for London. Statutory emergency fire and rescue service is provided by the London Fire Brigade, which has five stations in Croydon.

=== Policing ===
Croydon has five police stations. Croydon police station is on Park Lane in the centre of the town near the Fairfield Halls; South Norwood police station is a newly refurbished building just off High Street; Norbury police station is on London Road; Kenley station is on Godstone Road; and New Addington police station is on Addington Village Road.

=== Health services ===
NHS South West London Clinical Commissioning Group (a merger of the previous NHS Croydon CCG and others in Southwest London) is the body responsible for public health and for planning and funding health services in the borough. Croydon has 227 GPs in 64 practices, 156 dentists in 51 practices, 166 pharmacists and 70 optometrists in 28 practices.

Croydon University Hospital, formerly known as Mayday Hospital, built on a 19-acre (7.7 ha) site in Thornton Heath at the west of Croydon's boundaries with Merton, is a large NHS hospital administered by Croydon Health Services NHS Trust. Former names of the hospital include the Croydon Union Infirmary from 1885 to 1923 and the Mayday Road Hospital from 1923 to around 1930. It is a District General Hospital with a 24-hour accident and emergency department. NHS Direct has a regional centre based at the hospital. The NHS Trust also provides services at Purley War Memorial Hospital, in Purley. Croydon General Hospital was on London Road but services transferred to Mayday, as the size of this hospital was insufficient to cope with the growing population of the borough. Sickle Cell and Thalassaemia Centre and the Emergency Minor Treatment Centre are other smaller hospitals operated by the Mayday in the borough. Cane Hill was a psychiatric hospital in Coulsdon.

=== Waste management ===
Waste management is coordinated by the local authority. Unlike other waste disposal authorities in Greater London, Croydon's rubbish is collected independently and is not part of a shared waste authority unit. Locally produced inert waste for disposal is sent to landfill in the south of Croydon. There have recently been calls by the ODPM to bring waste management powers to the Greater London Authority, giving it a waste function. The Mayor of London has made repeated attempts to bring the different waste authorities together, to form a single waste authority in London. This has faced significant opposition from existing authorities. However, it has had significant support from all other sectors and the surrounding regions managing most of London's waste. Croydon has the joint best recycling rate in London, at 36%, but the refuse collectors have been criticised for their rushed performance lacking quality. Croydon's distribution network operator for electricity is EDF Energy Networks; there are no power stations in the borough. Thames Water manages Croydon's drinking and wastewater; water supplies are sourced from several local reservoirs, including Beckton and King George VI. Before 1971, Croydon Corporation was responsible for water treatment in the borough.

=== London Fire Brigade ===
The borough of Croydon is 86.52 km^{2}, populating approximately 340,000 people. There are five fire stations within the borough: Addington (two pumping appliances), Croydon (two pumping appliances, incident response unit, fire rescue unit and a USAR appliance), Norbury (two pumping appliances), Purley (one pumping appliance) and Woodside (one pumping appliance). Purley has the largest station ground but dealt with the fewest incidents during 2006/07.

The fire stations, as part of the Community Fire Safety scheme, visited 49 schools in 2006/2007.

=== Education ===
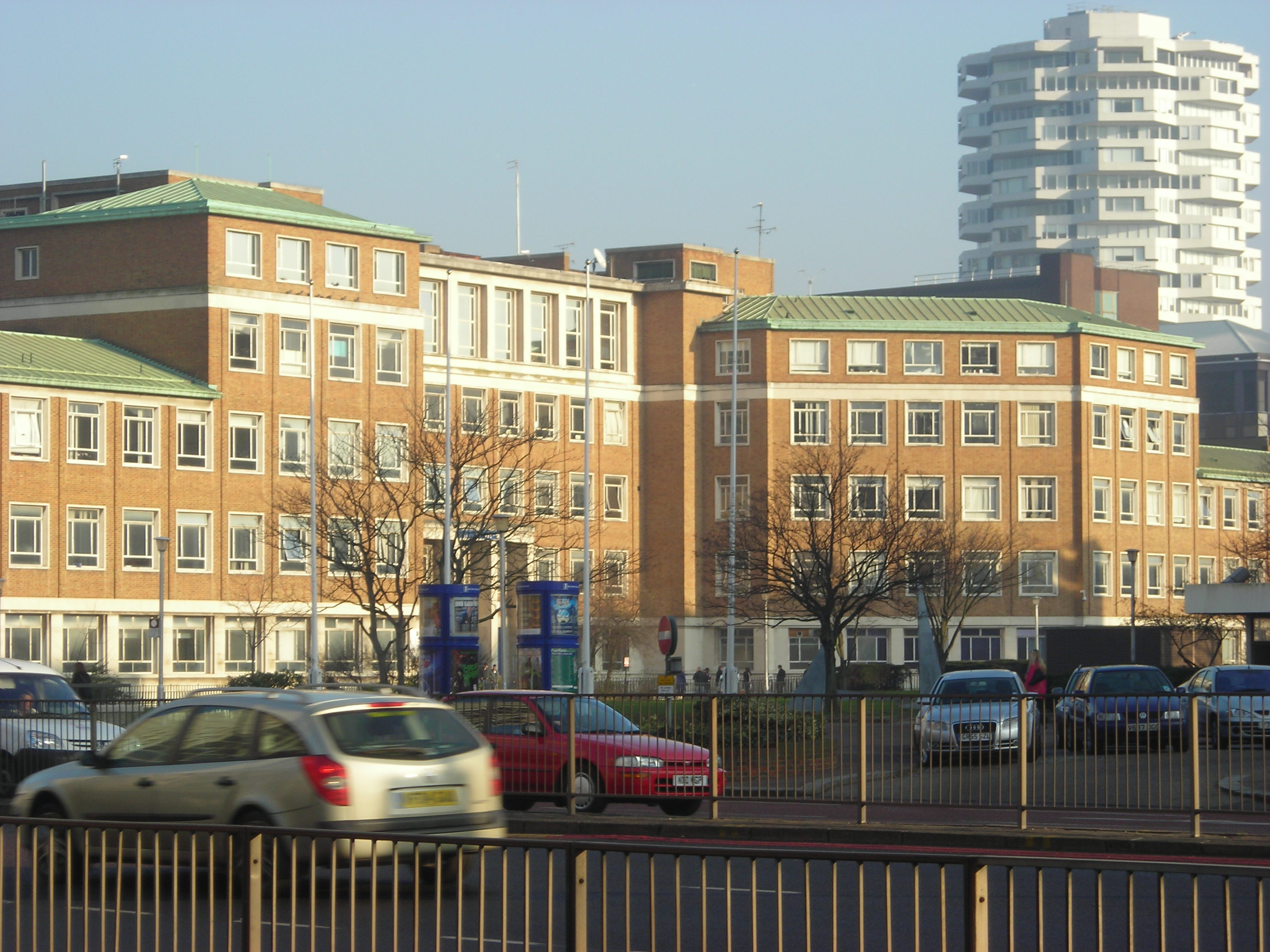
Croydon College's main buildings in Central Croydon

The borough, compared with other London boroughs, has the highest number of schools in it, with 26% of its population under 20 years old. They include primary schools (95), secondary schools (21) and four further education establishments. Croydon College has its main building in Central Croydon, and it is a high-rise building. John Ruskin College is one of the other colleges in the borough, located in Addington, and Coulsdon College in Coulsdon. South Norwood has been the home of Spurgeon's College, a world-famous Baptist theological college, since 1923; Spurgeon's is located on South Norwood Hill and currently has around 1,000 students. The London Borough of Croydon is the local education authority for the borough.

Overall, Croydon was ranked 77th out of all the local education authorities in the UK, up from 92nd in 2007. In 2007, the Croydon LEA was ranked 81st out of 149 in the country – and 21st in Greater London – based on the percentage of pupils attaining at least 5 A* – C grades at GCSE including maths and English (37.8% compared with the national average of 46.7%). The most successful public sector schools in 2010 were Harris City Academy Crystal Palace and Coloma Convent Girls' School. The percentage of pupils achieving 5 A* – C GCSEs including maths and English was above the national average in 2010.

=== Libraries ===
The borough of Croydon has 14 libraries, a joint library and a mobile library. Many of the libraries were built a long time ago and therefore have become outdated, so the council started updating a few, including Ashburton Library, which moved from its former spot into the state-of-the-art Ashburton Learning Village complex (on the former site of the old 'A Block' of Ashburton Community School). The library is now on one floor. This format was planned to be rolled out across all of the council's libraries but was deemed too costly to implement everywhere.

South Norwood Library, New Addington Library, Shirley Library, Selsdon Library, Sanderstead Library, Broad Green, Purley Library, Coulsdon Library and Bradmore Green Library are examples of older council libraries. The main library is Croydon Central Library, which holds many references, newspaper archives and a tourist information point (one of three in southeast London). Upper Norwood Library is a joint library with the London Borough of Lambeth. This means that both councils fund the library and its resources, but even though Lambeth has nearly doubled its funding for the library in the past several years, Croydon has kept its contribution the same, leading to concerns about the library's future.

== Sport and leisure ==
The borough has been criticised in the past for not having enough leisure facilities, which contributed to Croydon being rated a three-star borough. Thornton Heath's ageing sports centre was demolished and replaced by a newer, more modern leisure centre. South Norwood Leisure Centre was closed down in 2006 so that it could be demolished and re-designed from scratch like Thornton Heath, at an estimated cost of around £10 million.

South Norwood Forum had called for the new centre to be built on the site of the old one, but the Conservative council decided a refurbishment would be more economical than a full rebuild, causing some controversy.

Sport Croydon, is the commercial arm for leisure in the borough. Fusion currently provides leisure services for the council, a contract previously held by Parkwood Leisure.

Football teams include Crystal Palace F.C., which play at Selhurst Park, and in the Premier League. AFC Croydon Athletic, whose nickname is The Rams, is a football club who play at Croydon Sports Arena along with Croydon F.C., both in the Combined Counties League and Holmesdale, who were founded in South Norwood but currently play on Oakley Road in Bromley, and compete in the Southern Counties East Football League.

Non-football teams that play in Croydon are Streatham-Croydon RFC, a rugby union club in Thornton Heath who play at Frant Road, as well as South London Storm Rugby League Club, based at Streatham's ground, which compete in the Rugby League Conference. The London Olympians are an American football team that play in Division 1 South in the British American Football League. The Croydon Pirates are one of the most successful teams in the British Baseball Federation, though their ground is actually located just outside the borough in Sutton.

There are a number of field hockey clubs based in and around Croydon that are part of the South East Hockey and the London Hockey league structures. Current hockey clubs in and around the area are Addiscombe, Croydon Trinity Whitgiftian, Kenley, Purley, Purley Walcountians and Sanderstead.

Croydon Amphibians SC plays in the Division 2 British Water Polo League. The team won the National League Division 2 in 2008.

Croydon has over 120 parks and open spaces, ranging from the 200-acre (0.81 km^{2}) Selsdon Wood Nature Reserve to many recreation grounds and sports fields scattered throughout the Borough. This provides many places for rambling. The Wandle Trail links central London to Croydon and then the Vanguard Way links East Croydon to the South Coast, intersecting the London Loop, the North Downs Way and the Pilgrims' Way.

== Culture ==
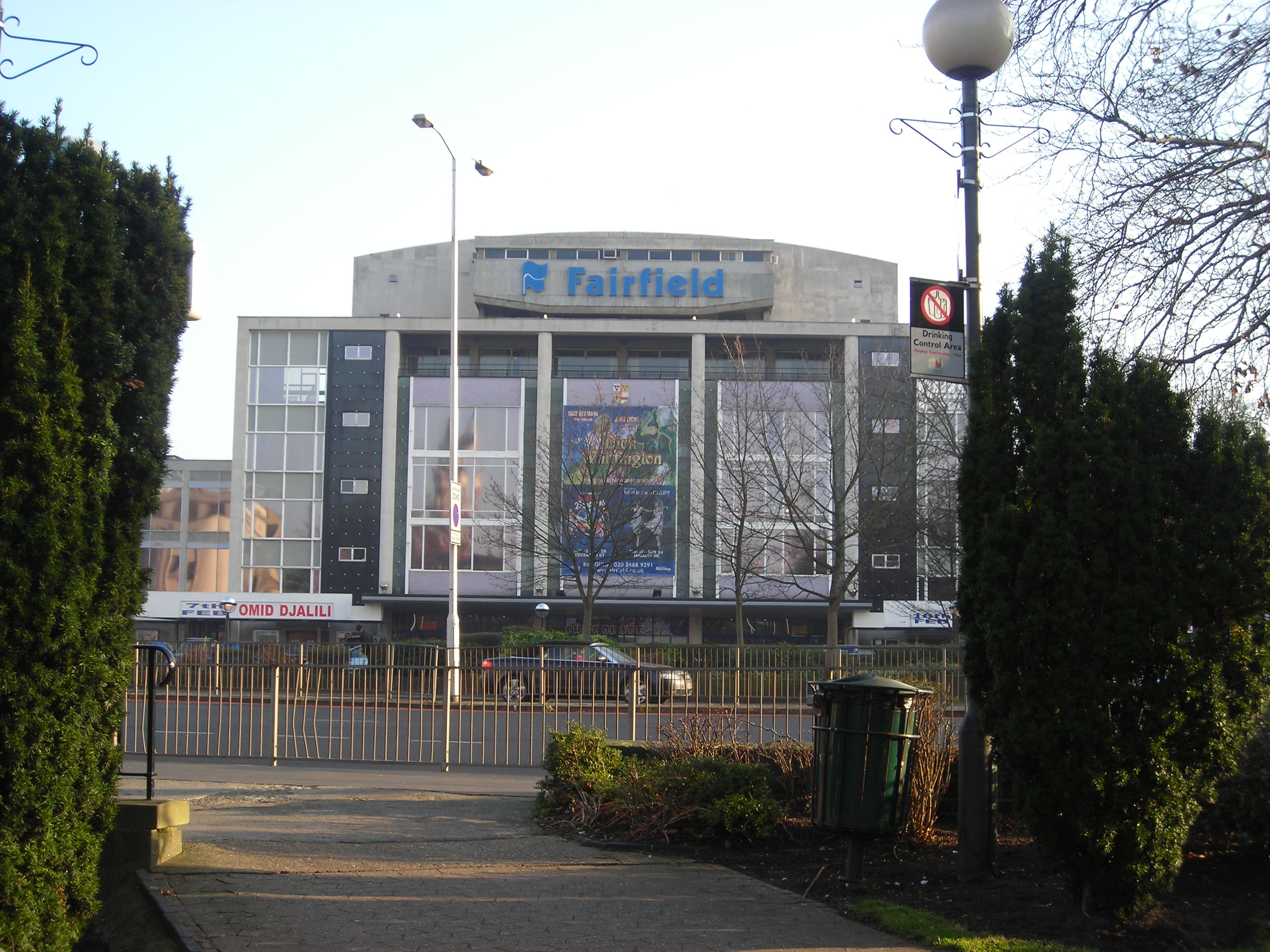
Fairfield Halls in Central Croydon is the main entertainment venue in the borough

Croydon has cut funding to the Warehouse Theatre.

In 2005, Croydon Council drew up a Public Art Strategy, with a vision intended to be accessible and to enhance people's enjoyment of their surroundings. The public art strategy delivered a new event called Croydon's Summer Festival hosted in Lloyd Park. The festival consists of two days of events. The first is called Croydon's World Party which is a free one-day event with three stages featuring world, jazz and dance music from the UK and internationally. The final day's event is the Croydon Mela, a day of music with a mix of traditional Asian culture and east-meets-western club beats across four stages, as well as dozens of food stalls and a funfair. It has attracted crowds of over 50,000 people. The strategy also created a creative industries hub in Old Town, ensured that public art is included in developments such as College Green and Ruskin Square and investigated the possibility of gallery space in the Cultural Quarter.

Fairfield Halls, Arnhem Gallery and the Ashcroft Theatre show productions that are held throughout the year such as drama, ballet, opera and pantomimes, and can be converted to show films. It also contains the Arnhem Gallery civic hall and an art gallery. Other cultural activities, including shopping and exhibitions, are Surrey Street Market which is mainly a meat and vegetables market near the main shopping environment of Croydon. The market has a Royal Charter dating back to 1276. Airport House is a newly refurbished conference and exhibition centre inside part of Croydon Airport. The Whitgift Centre is the current main shopping centre in the borough. Centrale is a new shopping centre that houses many more familiar names, as well as Croydon's House of Fraser.

== Media ==
There are three local newspapers which operate within the borough. The Croydon Advertiser began life in 1869, and was in 2005 the third-best selling paid-for weekly newspaper in London. The Advertiser is Croydon's major paid-for weekly paper and is on sale every Friday in five geographical editions: Croydon; Sutton & Epsom; Coulsdon & Purley; New Addington; and Caterham. The paper converted from a broadsheet to a compact (tabloid) format on 31 March 2006. It was bought by Northcliffe Media which is part of the Daily Mail and General Trust group on 6 July 2007. The Croydon Post is a free newspaper available across the borough and is operated by the Advertiser group. The circulation of the newspaper was in 2008 more than the main title published by the Advertiser Group.

The Croydon Guardian is another local weekly paper, which is paid for at newsagents but free at Croydon Council libraries and via deliveries. It is one of the best-circulated local newspapers in London and once had the highest circulation in Croydon with around one thousand more copies distributed than The Post.

The borough is served by the London regional versions of BBC and ITV coverage, from either the Crystal Palace or Croydon transmitters.

Croydon Television is owned by Croydon broadcasting corporation. Broadcasting from studios in Croydon, the CBC is fully independent. It does not receive any government or local council grants or funding and is supported by donations, sponsorship and by commercial advertising.

Capital Radio and Gold serve the borough. Local BBC radio is provided by BBC London 94.9. Other stations include Hits Radio, Greatest Hits Radio and Magic 105.4 FM from Bauer Radio and Capital Xtra, Heart 106.2 and Smooth Radio from Global Radio. In 2012, Croydon Radio, an online radio station, and the first official internet radio station for the London Borough of Croydon, began serving the area. Following the closure of Croydon Radio, Croydon FM was established in 2018, continuing local radio provision for the borough. The station initially broadcast online before being awarded a community FM licence in 2020, later expanding to DAB+ digital radio in 2025, alongside its online service. The borough is also home to its own local TV station, Croydon TV.

== Twinning ==
The London Borough of Croydon is twinned with the municipality of Arnhem which is located in the east of the Netherlands. The city of Arnhem is one of the 20 largest cities in the Netherlands. They have been twinned since 1946 after both towns had suffered extensive bomb damage during the recently ended war. There is also a Guyanese link supported by the council.

== Investment in the tobacco industry ==
In September 2009 it was revealed that Croydon Council had around £5.66 million of its pension fund for employees invested in shares in British American Tobacco. Members of the opposition Labour group on the council, who had banned such shareholdings when in control, described this as "dealing in death" and inconsistent with the council's tobacco control strategy.

In 2014, it was reported that the Croydon Council had divested its pension funds from tobacco-related holdings, in addition to nuclear power and weapons.

== Freedom of the Borough ==
The following people and military units have received the Freedom of the Borough of Croydon.

=== Individuals ===
- Michael Owuo Jr.: 19 May 2023.
- Merah Louise Smith: 19 May 2023.
- Roy Hodgson: 2018

=== Military units ===
- 41 (Princess Louise's Kensington) Signal Squadron Royal Corps of Signals (Volunteers): 1993.
- 151 Regiment RLC (Volunteers): 1993.
- 2 Company 10th Battalion The Parachute Regiment (Volunteers): 1993.
- "C" Squadron Kent and Sharpshooters Yeomanry The Royal Yeomanry: 1993.
- 2nd Battalion The Rifles: 2010.

== See also ==
- List of people from Croydon
- UK postcodes – a note of why and how postcodes CR0 and CR9 differ from the others
