= St Andrew's Church of England High School =

Location
- Warrington Road; Croydon, Greater London, CR0 4BH; United Kingdom; 51°22′10″N 0°06′36″W

Information
- Type: Voluntary aided school
- Motto: Per crucem ad coronam ("Through the cross to the crown")
- Religious affiliation: Church of England
- Established: 1861
- Closed: 2020
- Local authority: Croydon
- Department for Education URN: 101813 Tables
- Ofsted: Reports
- Staff: 75
- Gender: Coeducational
- Age: 11 to 16
- Houses: Durham, Lincoln, Salisbury, Wells, York
- Colour: Blue

St Andrew's Church of England High School was a Church of England voluntary aided school in Central Croydon, Greater London. First opened in 1862, The school was part of the educational provision of the Diocese of Southwark and later, the London Borough of Croydon. It closed in 2020.

== History ==
Saint Andrew's school was opened in the summer of 1861 by Reverend Fitzroy John Fitzwygram, initially in rented rooms behind St Andrew's Church in Lower Coombe Street and next to the Surrey Cricketers public house. His intention was to provide education for the working class. By December of the following year permanent building for boys and girls, as well as an infants schools were opened in Southbridge Road. However, the Whitgift Foundation opened a Whitgift Poor School for boys nearby, which later became known as Trinity School of John Whitgift, and in the summer of 1864 the boys school closed owing to lack of numbers. The girls' school expanded into the vacated buildings.

In 1893 the Whitgift Poor School changed its focus, and became an aspirational school for the middle classes. Funding was therefore sought to re-open the Saint Andrew's boys school. At the same time, inspectors found the other buildings to be too small and so the whole school was rebuilt.

=== Reverend Fitzroy John Fitzwygram ===
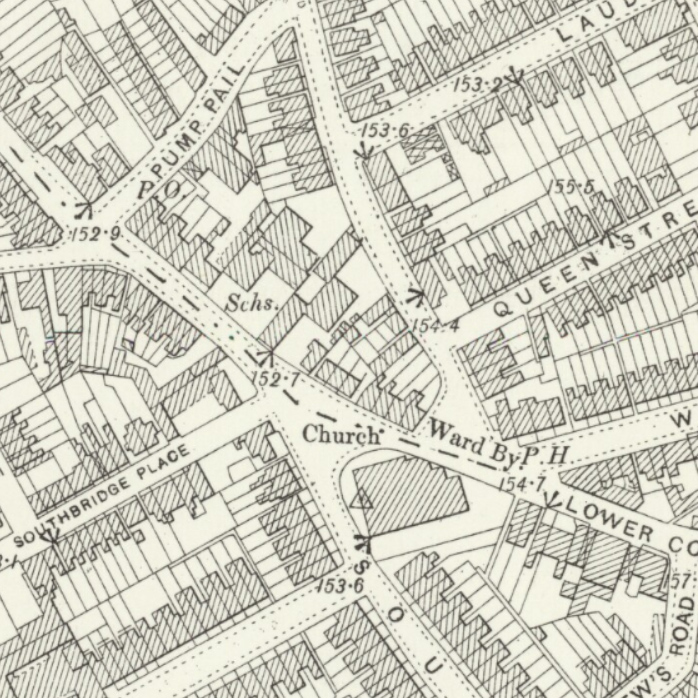
Map from 1895 showing original site of St Andrew's School, Croydon.

Fitzwygram ran the parish of St Andrew's for about 18 months during the absence of the first vicar, Rev. H. R. Reynolds. He was born in 1827 the fourth son to Sir R. F. Fitzwygram, baronet of Leigh Park. One of his brothers, Frederick Fitzwygram, became a military General and an MP. The family were wealthy and had always taken a benevolent interest in their local community. Fitzwygram may have been generous with his wealth but he most certainly did not believe in ‘hand-outs’ for the poor. His strategy was much more to ‘empower’ them.

Seeing the needs of the parish of St Andrew's, within a month of arriving in Croydon in mid-1861 he had hired a temporary schoolroom and raised over half of the £110 (about £5000 in today's money) needed to convert the room and set it up as a school. Most of this money was either his own, or from close family members. News of his project was reported as the first piece of Croydon News in the very first issue of the Croydon Times, established on 29 June 1861. His intention was to set up a school for the middle classes, i.e. a "middle" school for which families would pay a few pence a week for their children to attend. This would be self-supporting financially, and eventually be capable of also housing an "industrial school" for the working classes. They would still have to pay but at a much lower rate. The idea was that the poor received a good education, but at a rate that they could afford. This was in direct contrast to the local ragged school, which was funded by charitable donations and provided a form of free education and often food and clothing to the poorest children. However, the poor quality of education at the ragged school was a cause of much controversy in the Croydon Times, leading eventually to an editorial.

The insistence that even the poor had to pay some thing was most definitely not because Fitzwygram did not care about the poor, but rather that he wanted to show them how to work their way out of poverty. For example, to help the poorest in Croydon – those labourers who maybe only had work during the summer months – he set up a "coal club" so that families could pay during the summer months for the sacks of coal they would need during the winter months. He was a regular visitor at the school, spending at least two hours there every Monday morning.

He campaigned enthusiastically in the local press for funds to complete the building of the purpose-built schools and by Nov 1861 a site had been secured between Old Town and Church Road, very close to the Church. Within a year, the schools were completed and formally opened at the beginning of Dec 1862.

Just one month later, Fitzwygram suddenly left Croydon and Rev. H. R. Reynolds, the incumbent, or "official" vicar, returned to take up his post once more. The circumstances surrounding Fitzwygram's departure are not clear, but reports in the local papers indicate that the return of the vicar was an unsettled time for the parish. However, the school was very important to Fitzwygram and the staff and pupils were obviously fond of him. He returned to visit the pupils a couple of weeks later when special gifts of a salver and a silver lead pencil were presented to him and words of appreciation said. The event concluded with the children being allowed home early!

=== Early years ===
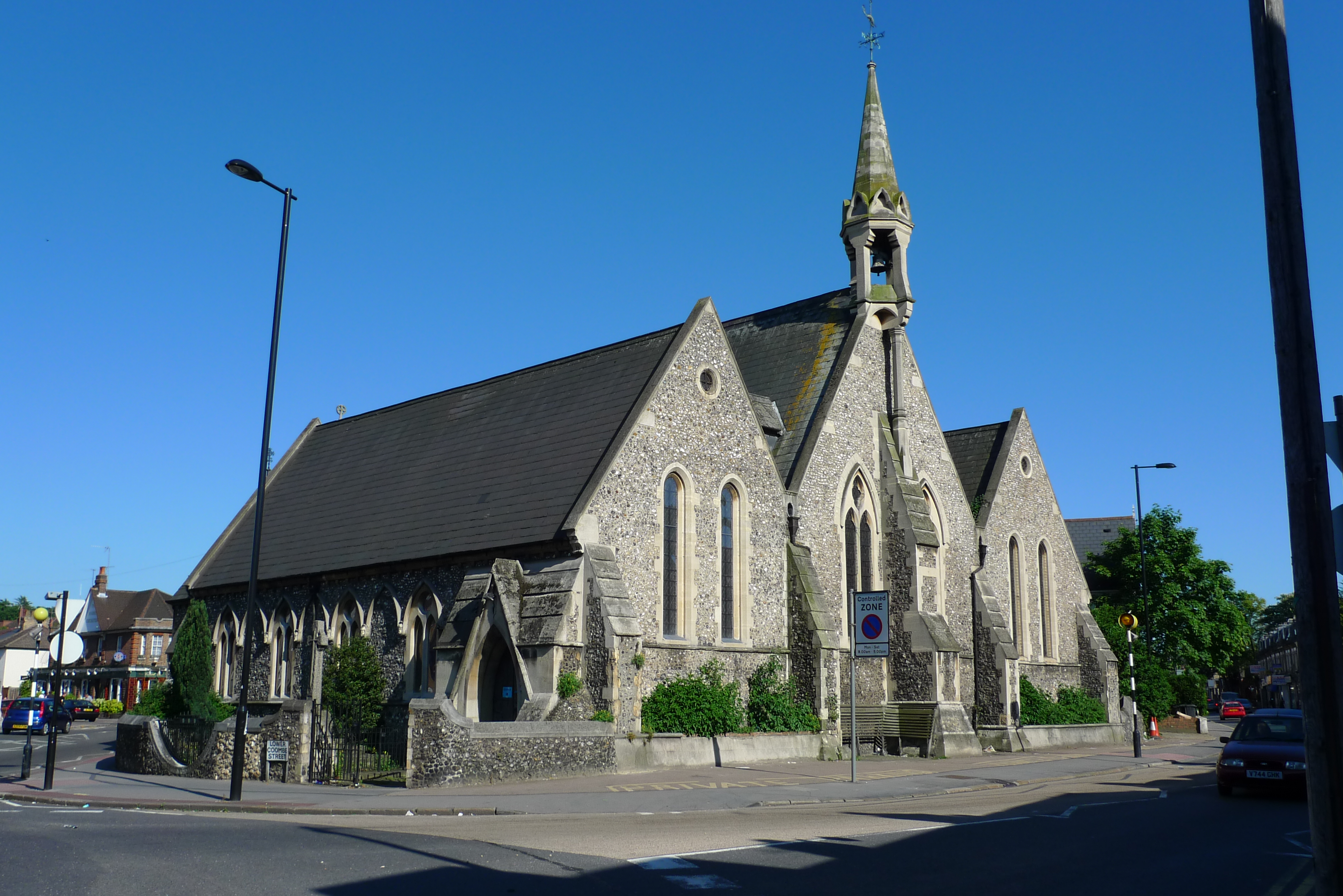
St Andrew's Church. The original rented school rooms were behind the building in the background

The girls' and infants' school got off to a very successful start. It was led by a twenty-one year old called Fanny Thornton who, although young, would have already completed a five-year apprenticeship as a pupil monitor before completing two years' training to qualify her to teach. She was assisted by two of her younger sisters. The girls' and infants' school opened with 31 pupils but, within four months, numbers had risen to 80. Because schooling for girls was not compulsory until after 1871, there were probably fewer schools for girls in Croydon. At St Andrew's, there were four classes all taught in one room at the same time.

The boys' school opened with 23 pupils and numbers were never as high as in the girls’ school. This was probably due to the fact that there were more schools for boys in Croydon competing with St Andrew's. Just next door but one, in Church Street, was the Whitgift Poor School which went on to become Trinity School. The head of St Andrew's boys' school was also a twenty-one year old. His name was Frederic Le Huquet and he came from Guernsey. Croydon Old Town in those days was not a healthy place to live. It was damp in the valley and the housing was often squalid and insanitary with the poor drainage. Smallpox was a common disease amongst the pupils. Mr Le Huquet wrote in the school log-book in 1863 that he had a "fear of contagion". This proved sadly prophetic for within ten months of taking up his post as head master of the new St Andrew's school for boys, he died from smallpox.

=== 20th century ===
In 1927 the school was reorganised as a single school for the first time. Enrolment increased and education was provided from infants to age 11 in a single school. Within five years the school had to be rebuilt and enlarged to accommodate the numbers, and the offering was extended up to age 14. The Archbishop of Canterbury opened the new school on 28 April 1934. At the time Croydon was still part of the diocese of Canterbury.

Schooling was reorganised in 1951. Primary education was removed from Saint Andrew's and provided in nearby church Primary Schools. Saint Andrew's was then converted to become a Secondary Modern School.

In 1964 the Croydon Flyover was constructed, necessitating the demolition of the school, so once again a new building was constructed, this time on Warrington Road on Duppas Hill.

The school changed status in 1978 from a secondary modern to a voluntary aided comprehensive school, with a joint entry with Archbishop Tenison's School. The curriculum was changed to match the curriculum at Tenison's, and Latin was added. The headmaster wrote in the new school log book: "The School was opened as a comprehensive High School sharing an intake at 11+ with Archbishop Tenison's School. Complete mixed ability. Class introduced to a new range of subjects in parallel with Tenison's including Latin".

=== 21st century ===
The school achieved specialist status for Music in 2006, However the Specialist Schools Programme was dismantled in 2010. The school established a sixth form for the first time, opening in 2013. However, disappointing results left the sixth form enrolment so low that in 2015 the decision was takn to close it.

The overall enrolment at the school then fell below the published level of 695, with the school no longer offering places to years 7–9. This impacted on funding and recruitment. Authorities had been looking at the possibility of merger and considering the closure of the school in August 2020.

Headteacher Kerry Target joined the school in September 2015 and then in 2019 OFSTED reported the school's effectiveness was inadequate. A previous OFSTED report had cited the effective measures that the school has in place to support teaching and learning and continue to raise outcomes. In July 2018 mere weeks before the end of term, it was announced that all year 8 and 9 students at St Andrew's would need to find new school places for September and that no new Year 7 students would be admitted. Jonathan Harris, formerly Headteacher at an underperforming secondary school in North Lincolnshire, Thomas Middlecott Academy, took the helm to close the school. As of the start of the 2019–2020 school year, there were 241 students enrolled in the school. The school closed at the end of the Summer term 2020.

As of September 2020, the St. Andrews site is serving as the temporary site of Coombe Wood School.

== Enrichment ==
The school established a theatre company to help students stage regular showcases, including cultural celebrations and concerts. Through its relationship with the British Theatre Academy, the school saw its pupils perform in the West End in The Color Purple.

The programme of enrichment and outreach with feeder primary schools saw St Andrew's students leading workshops at feeder primary schools, becoming teachers for the day. The school's STEM programme aims to provide students with a unique STEM focus across the curriculum. As part of this, St Andrew's hosted a ‘Science in Action’ workshop for hundreds of primary school pupils, led by the school's expert science team. The programme gives primary school pupils the opportunity to get hands on with science. Computing is also featured, with primary school pupils creating a one-player computer game.

== Badge ==
The St Andrew's badge was inspired the Scottish national flag, but was developed to a unique logo showing a shield with the white saltire cross of St Andrew on a blue (heraldic azure) ground, with the cross pierced a red five-leafed open coronet. On the under side of the shield was the Latin school motto: Per crucem ad coronam.

== Sister school ==
The annual admissions procedure was shared with St Andrew's sister school, Archbishop Tenison's, from 1978 until 2018. When the decision was taken to close St Andrew's, the governors of Archbishop Tenison's were offered the opportunity to expand into the St Andrew's school site. The governor's voted not to do so.
