= Old Town, Croydon =

Neighbourhood in Croydon

Coordinates: 51.373°N 0.105°W

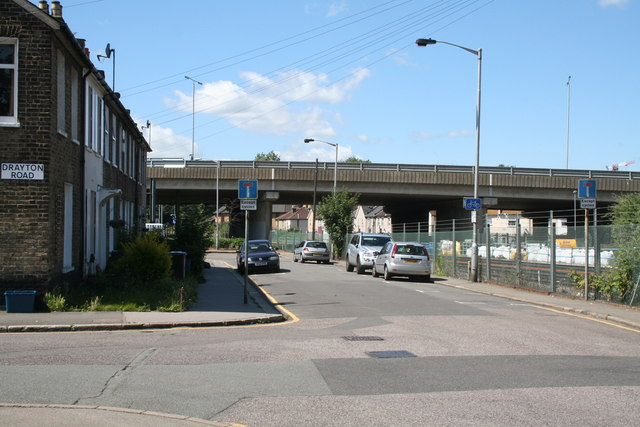
The dual-carriageway Croydon Flyover at Old Town, seen from Ruskin Road

Old Town is a neighbourhood in the London Borough of Croydon, lying immediately to the west of Croydon town centre. It is centred on Croydon Minster and the Old Palace, and is the location of the original early medieval settlement of Croydon. As defined for modern planning purposes, the neighbourhood includes Surrey Street Market to the east, and extends west as far as the boundaries of Wandle Park, and south to Croydon Flyover (part of the east–west A232 road). It is bisected by the north–south A236 dual carriageway, known along this stretch as Roman Way. It is in the CR0 postcode area.

== History ==
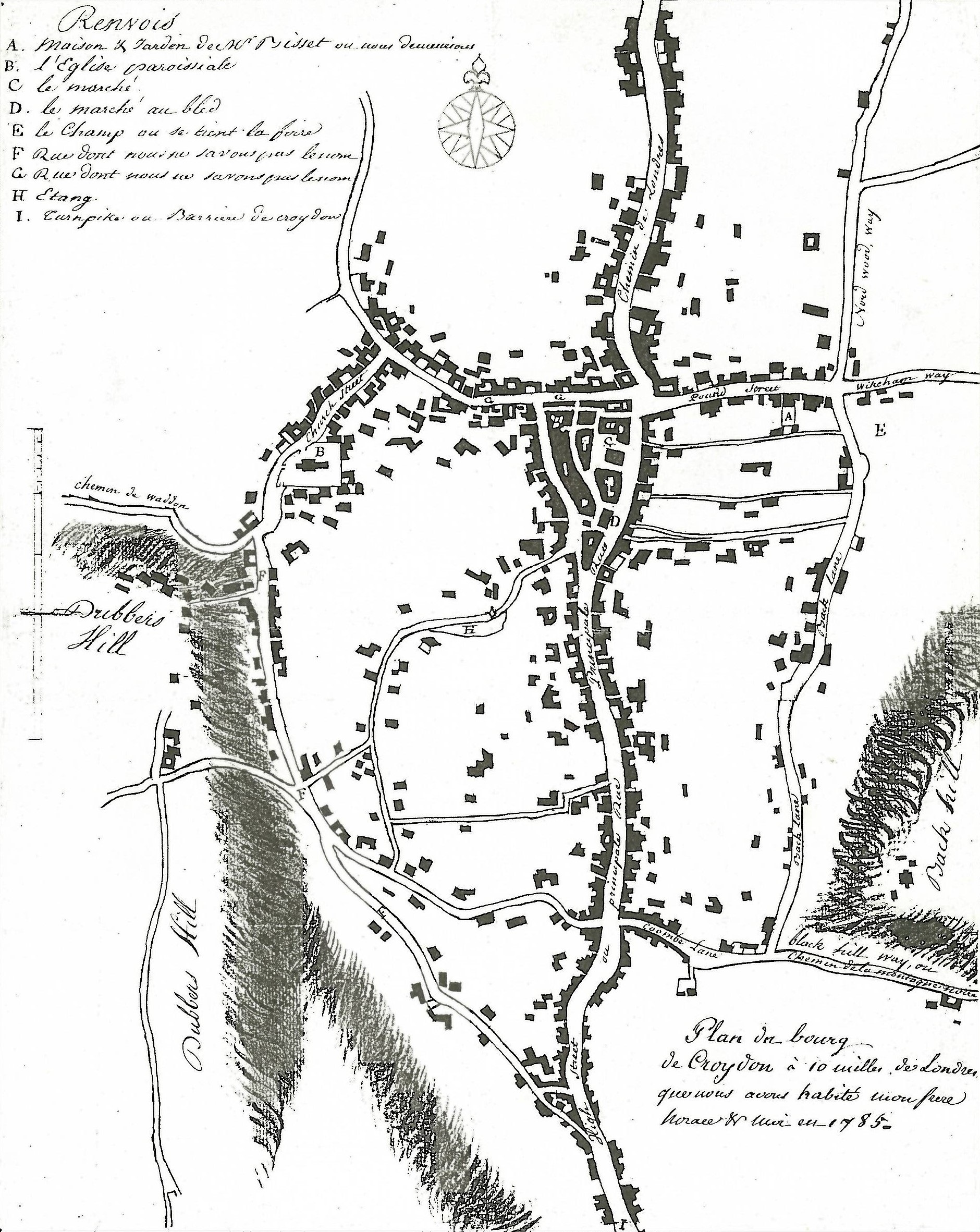
Map of Croydon by Jean-Baptiste Say, 1785. Old Town (including the parish church, marked B) lies to the west. The triangular medieval marketplace, associated with Archbishop Kilwardby's market charter of 1276, lies further east, although by this date infilled with buildings.

A Roman road, the London to Portslade Way, is known to have passed through what is now Croydon, but its precise route is debated. The most convincing suggestion is that it ran through Old Town, and it is in acknowledgement of this theory that the local section of the A236 dual carriageway was named Roman Way in the 1960s. An alternative theory is that the Roman road was situated on the higher ground to the east, running along what is now North End, High Street and South End in central Croydon.

A settlement developed at Croydon in the mid-to-late Anglo-Saxon period, around the parish church (now Croydon Minster) and the manor house of the Archbishops of Canterbury (Croydon Palace). However, in 1276 Archbishop Robert Kilwardby acquired a charter for a weekly market, and, probably in association with this charter, laid out a new market place on the higher ground to the east, in the triangle now bounded by High Street, Surrey Street and Crown Hill. Croydon's commercial and social focus therefore also shifted east, leaving Old Town on its periphery. The earliest occurrences of the name "Old Town" ("Vetere Croyndon" or "vetire villa") date from the 1280s, implying that the locality was already seen as subsidiary to the "new town" around the market and High Street.

The area was also prone to flooding from the River Wandle, and in the early modern period declined further into a partial slum area. The archbishops sold the palace in 1781, purchasing instead a new residence at Addington. The Old Palace buildings were subsequently used largely for industrial purposes, before being taken over by Old Palace School, which occupied them from 1889 to 2025.

== Present day ==
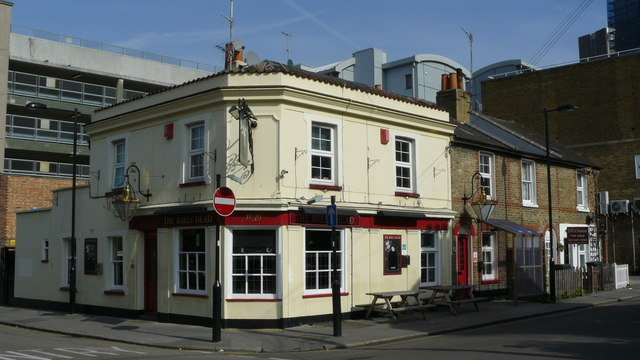
The Bull's Head on Laud Street, a quiet backstreet pub in Old Town

The Old Town area now has a large residential and business community. There is one secondary school, The Write Time School, which occupies the buildings of the former St Andrew's Church of England High School. Old Town is also home to Croydon town centre's main fire station.

The area partially overlaps with three conservation areas: the Croydon Minster Conservation Area, the Church Street Conservation Area, and the Central Croydon Conservation Area.

A prominent local business is the House of Reeves, an independent furniture store founded in 1867, which gives its name to the road intersection of Reeves Corner, between Church Street and Roman Way. The company came to widespread national public attention in August 2011, when one of its buildings was destroyed in an arson attack during the 2011 England riots.

In 2017 the area was the site of a council-funded tech incubator scheme, with several companies relocating from central London.

== Nearest stations ==
- Reeves Corner tram stop
- Church Street tram stop
- Wandle Park tram stop
- West Croydon station
- Waddon railway station
