= New Addington Library =

Public library in Croydon, London, England

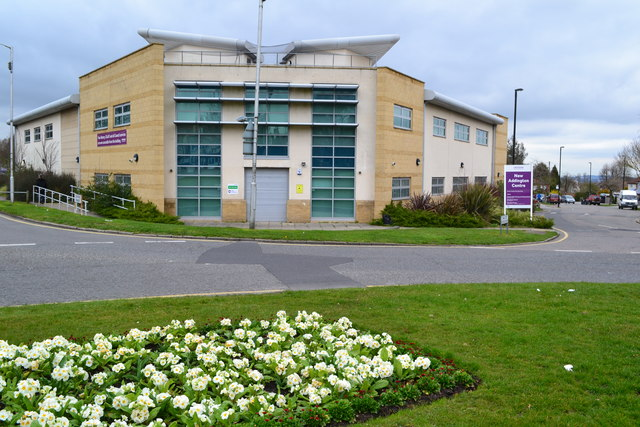
- The New Addington Centre
- Interactive map of the New Addington Library area

General information
- Location: Central Parade CR0 0JD, New Addington, London, United Kingdom
- Coordinates: 51.3416°N 0.0155°W
- Client: London Borough of Croydon

Website
- Home page

New Addington Library is a public library in New Addington, South London. It stands in the London Borough of Croydon and is part of the Croydon Libraries arm of the council. The library was relocated to the New Addington Centre in 2013.
