= Coat of arms of the London Borough of Croydon =

Heraldic arms, since 1965, of a borough in England

- Crest: Out of a Mural Crown Or a Fountain between a Branch of Oak leaved and fructed and one of Beech slipped proper.
- Shield: Argent on a Cross flory at the ends Sable five Bezants between in chief to the dexter two Swords Azure and Gules in saltire and to the sinister two Keys Azure and Gules in saltire.
- Supporters: On the dexter side a Lion sable and on the sinister side a Horse Argent each with a Cross formy fitchy pendent from a Collar counter-changed.
- Motto: Ad Summa Nitamur – "Let us strive for perfection"

The coat of arms of the London Borough of Croydon is the official heraldic arms of the London Borough of Croydon, granted on 10 December 1965.

The borough was created by uniting the County Borough of Croydon (granted arms in 1886) and the Coulsdon and Purley Urban District (granted arms in 1953), and the coat of arms were created by using charges from the heraldry of these old entities.

The black cross is a cross flory, which means each arms is terminating in the shape of a fleur-de-lis. The cross is surmounted by five gold discs, so called bezants. This cross reflects the centuries-long connection of the area with the Archbishops of Canterbury, whose summer home was Croydon Palace; the cross was present in the arms of the County Borough of Croydon, to which it had been derived from the arms of Archbishop John Whitgift, who was a benefactor of the town of Croydon, where three schools form part of his foundation. The crossed swords refer to St. Paul and the crossed keys to St. Peter refer to the Abbey of St. Peter and St. Paul of Chertsey, which was granted the Manor of Coulsdon in the year 727. The keys were also present in the crest of the arms of Coulsdon and Purley and they also refer to the Abbey of St. Peter of Winchester (later renamed Hyde Abbey), owner of the Manor of Sanderstead from 964.

The mural crown is a common heraldic symbol for local municipal authority in a town or city. Out of the crown comes a heraldic fountain, a symbol for water, in this case the source of the River Wandle in particular. The fountain is surrounded by a branch of oak and a branch of beech, for the Purley oak and Purley beech, significant trees in the area which were also present in the Coulsdon and Purley coat of arms.

The supporters are a black lion and a silver horse. The lion comes from the arms of Coulsdon and Purley and is again a reference to Hyde Abbey. The horse is from the arms of the Earls of Surrey, since the two merged entities were situated in Surrey before becoming part of Greater London. Croydon was never a constituent part of the administrative county council area of Surrey, but only of the historic county. Surrey County Council and the County Borough of Croydon (granting the borough county status) were both created because of the Local Government Act 1888 and were implemented from 1 April 1889. Coulsdon and Purley UDC was a constituent of the old Surrey County Council.

The supporters wear collars, each with a cross formy fitchy. These crosses are from the coat of arms of the Diocese of Canterbury, again recalling the association with the see through the Croydon Palace, and three crosses like these were displayed in the coat of arms of the former county borough.

The motto Ad summa nitamur is Latin for "Let us strive for perfection".

== See also ==
- Armorial of London
