= Georgina King Lewis =

British activist (1847–1824)

- Born: 1847; Kensington, London, England
- Died: 5 December 1924 (aged 76–77); Croydon, London, England
- Occupations: Philanthropist, war worker, temperance activist, writer
- Spouse: Henry King Lewis
- Father: John Stoughton

Georgina King Lewis (1847 – 5 December 1924) was a British writer and philanthropist in the Quaker tradition, described as a "Friend of the Oppressed", for her work in Croydon, South London, England, and in war zones in South Africa and Bulgaria.

== Early life ==
Lewis was born in Kensington, the daughter of John Stoughton and Mary Vyse Stoughton. Her father was a Congregationalist minister. Her older brother Thomas Wilberforce Stoughton was the co-founder of Hodder & Stoughton, the publishing house.

== Philanthropy ==
Lewis donated £1,200 to the first Ruskin House, and was active in the Temperance movement. Lewis was appointed a member of the Women's Central Committee on Temperance in 1899. From 1899 to 1901 she worked in a hospital in South Africa during the Boer War; in 1903 she went to Macedonia as a relief worker. In 1906 she had an audience with Pope Pius X to discuss the humanitarian crisis in the Congo Free State. She was an officer of the Anti-Slavery and Aborigines Protection Society.

== Publications ==
Lewis published a biography of her father in 1898. She also wrote Critical Times in Turkey, and pamphlet biographies of George Fox, Elizabeth Fry and John Greenleaf Whittier, as well as a memoir published posthumously.

- John Stoughton, D.D.: A Short Record of a Long Life (1898)
- "How Best to Keep up the Interest of our Young People in our Society" (1899)
- George Fox (1903)
- Elizabeth Fry (1903)
- John Greenleaf Whittier
- Critical Times in Turkey and England's Responsibility (1905)
- "The Inner Light" (1921)

== Personal life ==
Stoughton was the second wife of publisher Henry King Lewis. Her husband died in 1898, and she died in 1924, at the age of 77. Her funeral was attended by councillors and clergy, and representatives of Ruskin House. To quote her obituary in the Croydon Advertiser, December 13, 1924, Mrs. King Lewis left behind "the practical results and inspiring memory of a wonderful life of discriminating service for others."
