= Nestlé Tower =

High-rise building in Croydon, London, England

Coordinates: 51.3731°N 0.0971°W

St George's House, Croydon
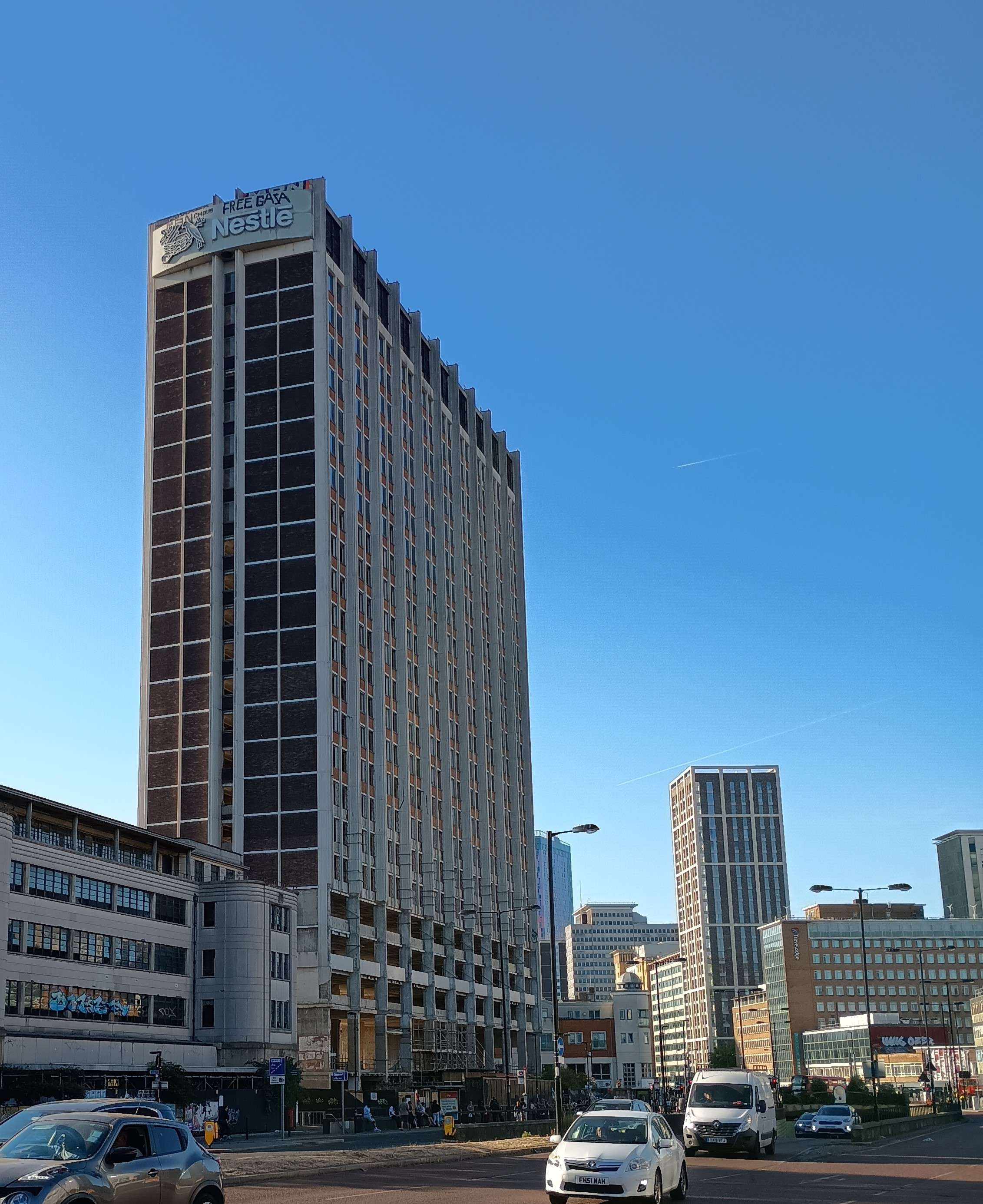
- St George's House, Croydon in 2026

- Location within Greater London
- Alternative names: Nestlé Tower

General information
- Location: Croydon, London, United Kingdom
- Completed: 1964
- Client: Nestlé S.A. (to 2012)
- Owner: Minerva

Technical details
- Floor count: 24

Design and construction
- Architecture firm: Ronald Ward and Partners

St George's House (also known as the Nestlé Tower or Nestlé Block) is a derelict 79-metre (259 ft) office tower located in Croydon, United Kingdom. It was occupied by the Swiss multinational food and consumer goods company Nestlé as the headquarters of Nestlé UK & Ireland until September 2012. Conversion into a residential building began in 2018 but was abandoned in 2020.

== Location ==
The tower is located on Park Lane above the Croydon Underpass and close to the Croydon Council offices in Bernard Weatherill House, Croydon College, and the theatre and performance space of the Fairfield Halls and Ashcroft Theatre.

== History ==
The tower was designed by architects Ronald Ward and Partners, who also designed Millbank Tower, and it was completed in 1964.

The eastern entrance to St George's Walk shopping arcade is located at the base of the tower and the ground floor also housed the Greyhound, which, as well as fulfilling the functions of a town centre public house, became well known as a music venue. Later known as the Blue Orchid nightclub, the venue closed in 2004.

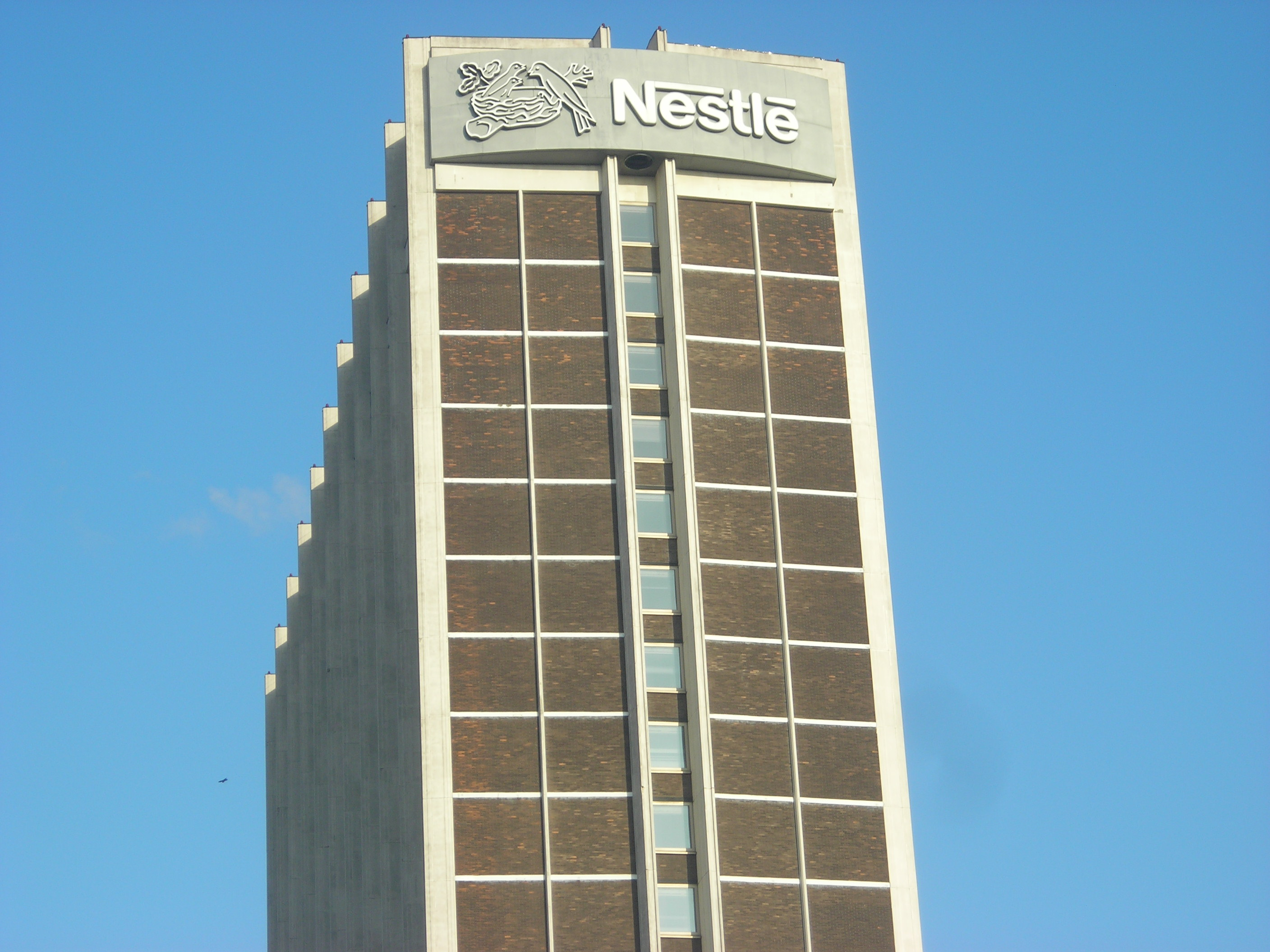
The building's Nestlé branding

In January 2012, Nestlé announced that it intended to move the headquarters of Nestlé UK & Ireland to City Place Gatwick, with all 840 employees based at St George's House moved to Gatwick by the end of 2012.

The Croydon council agreed in February 2013 to switch the use of the building from offices to housing. Architect firm EPR Architects was hired to redesign the building. However, in September 2015, no work was done to advance on the housing project, leading London property developer Minerva to buy the tower for £10 million to incorporate in a wider neighbourhood housing project.

In November 2018, work began to convert the tower into three high-rise apartment blocks as well as to demolish part of St George's Walk, to create a new public square (Queen's Square) adjacent to the old Town Hall. Construction work stopped in 2020 and as of 2026, the building remains derelict.

== Transport links ==
St George's House has various transport links nearby. George Street tram stop is the closest Tramlink station to the offices. From here there are services to Wimbledon station with connections to the London Underground, or to Beckenham Junction station and Elmers End station with train connections to Sutton and slow trains to Central London as well as London Overground services. There are also tram services from East Croydon to New Addington, Elmers End and Beckenham. There is also a bus station at West Croydon with buses on the northbound corridor and the rest of the borough. East Croydon station, the main railway station in the borough, is also close by. The station provides mainline services from Southern and Thameslink. These train operating companies provide services to Brighton and the South Coast, Bedford, Luton, Luton Airport, Gatwick Airport and fast services to Victoria and London Bridge.

== See also ==
- Taberner House
- Croydon Gateway
- St George's Walk
