= Croydon Palace =

Former medieval archbishop's palace

Coordinates: 51°22′21.94″N 00°06′17.89″W

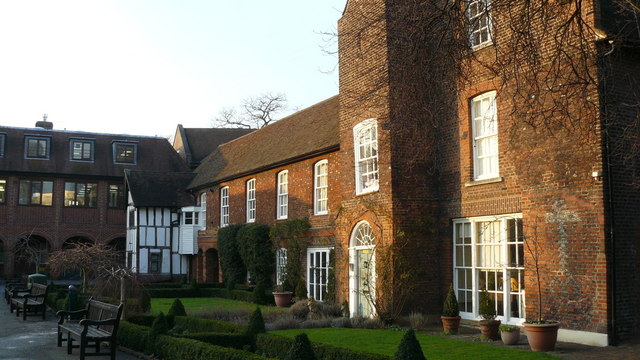
Old Palace School

Croydon Palace, in the Old Town neighbourhood of Croydon, now part of south London, was the summer residence of the Archbishop of Canterbury for over 500 years. Regular visitors included Henry III and Queen Elizabeth I. Now known as Old Palace, the surviving buildings were occupied from 1889 to 2025 by Old Palace School, an independent girls' school: since 2025, they have been occupied by Serenity School Old Palace, a special educational needs school. The Palace has been a Grade I listed building since 1951.

== History ==
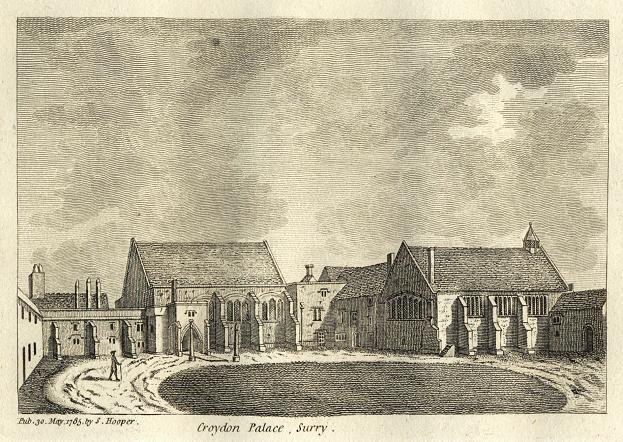
Engraving of Croydon Palace circa 1785, from The Antiquities of England and Wales by Francis Grose

The Manor of Croydon was connected with the Archbishop of Canterbury from at least the late Saxon period, and records of buildings date back to before 960. The location of the original manor house is unknown. A larger palace was required to accommodate the retinues of the archbishop and his guests, and as a staging post between Canterbury and Lambeth Palace. The palace as it now exists is a group of largely 15th- and 16th-century buildings, "an aggregate of buildings of different castes and ages", as Archbishop Herring found it in 1754. Only the parts used by the archbishops remain: the servants' quarters, which made up the remaining three and a half sides of an irregular quadrangle, were demolished in the 19th century.

The palace was entered from Church Street down today's Old Palace Road, which was protected by iron gates from 1742. Along the south side of today's Church Road was the porter's lodge and stables that formed the north side of the quadrangle. An archway in the porter's lodge permitted access to the palace. South of Church Road, along the east side of the Old Palace Road, were the servants' quarters. This was a two-storey brick building that formed the east side of the quadrangle. A similar building formed the west side of the quadrangle for the servants of guests. The upper storey was accessed by an external wooden staircase and passageway. Kitchens, buttery etc. connected the Great Hall and servants quarters to the east.

The 15th-century Great Hall is thought to have been installed by Archbishop Stafford (d. 1452), with a late-14th-century two-storey porch and a vaulted ceiling to the lower chamber. The hall interior has a rich 16th-century timber roof and windows with interesting features such as the late Gothic interior porch. The Great Hall was partially remodelled in the 17th century by archbishops Laud and Juxon, who also rebuilt the chapel.

West of the hall are the state apartments including the first-floor Guard Room, now the school library. The room is ascribed to Archbishop Arundel (Archbishop 1396–1414), and has an arch-braced roof with carved stone supports and an oriel window. Other rooms have later panelling and fireplaces. The chapel has fine 17th-century stalls and an elaborate corner gallery. The fine altar rails are now in the Guard Room. The exterior of the whole palace is of stone or red brick, with early stone windows or Georgian sash windows.

The connection of the archbishops with Croydon was of great importance, with several being important local benefactors. Six are buried in Croydon Minster, neighbouring the palace: in date order they were Edmund Grindal, John Whitgift, Gilbert Sheldon, William Wake, John Potter and Thomas Herring. Archbishop Whitgift, who first called it a "palace", liked Croydon for "the sweetness of the place", though not all admired it, in the low-lying site which Henry VIII found "rheumatick", a place where he could not stay "without sickness". Sir Francis Bacon found it "an obscure and darke place" surrounded by its dense woodland.

Croydon Palace Act 1780
- Act of Parliament
- Parliament of Great Britain
- Long title: An Act for vesting in Trustees the Capital Messuage, with the Appurtenances, at Croydon, in the County of Surrey, known by the Name of The Palace of the Archbishop of Canterbury, and Two Closes near thereto adjoining, in Trust to sell the same; and for disposing of, and applying the Money to arise thereby, and received on account of the Dilapidations thereof, and other Money in the Manner and for the Purposes therein mentioned.
- Citation: 20 Geo. 3. c. 57 Pr.
- Territorial extent: Great Britain

Dates
- Royal assent: 23 June 1780
- Commencement: 25 November 1779 (Note: Start of session.)

Status: Current legislation

By the 18th century, the palace had become dilapidated and uncomfortable and the local area was squalid. In 1715 Archbishop Wake wanted to demolish it, although he subsequently had the Long Gallery reconstructed and Archbishop Herring had other work done. By 1780, it had remained uninhabited for the last 20 years and Parliament decided to build a new palace. A private act of Parliament, the Croydon Palace Act 1780 (20 Geo. 3. c. 57 Pr.), enabled Croydon Palace to be sold and Addington Palace on the outskirts of Croydon to be bought in 1807. This became the new episcopal summer residence for much of the rest of the 19th century.

Croydon Palace was bought at auction with the adjacent meadows to the south and east by the brandy merchant Abraham Pitches for £2,520 on 10 October 1780, which he subsequently let for calico printing and bleaching. The palace had several owners over the next 100 years, but was primarily associated with calico printing, bleaching and later as a laundry. The servants' quarters on the west were demolished around 1802 and became part of the graveyard in 1808. By 1805 the Croydon, Merstham and Godstone Railway cut through the palace grounds, creating today's Church Road. The porter's lodge was demolished around 1806, followed by the kitchens in 1810 to provide another entrance to the palace. Bankruptcy saw the palace sold in lots on 20 March 1832, with the subsequent demolition of the quadrangle's east side. Bleaching continued at the palace until it was sold by private agreement to Henry Pelham-Clinton, the 7th Duke of Newcastle at the beginning of June 1887. He gave the palace to the Sisters of the Church, who restored it and founded it as Old Palace School in 1889.

Old Palace School closed in 2025. The site (including the historic Old Palace and Great Hall) was then sold to the Curwen Group private equity firm, and leased to Serenity Education Group, which opened a special educational needs school, Serenity School Old Palace, on the premises..

== Legacy ==
The historic connection between Croydon and the archbishops is recognised in the modern coat of arms of the London Borough of Croydon. Several streets in Croydon are named after the archbishops, including Whitgift Street, Grindall Close, Sheldon Street, Laud Street, Cranmer Road and Parker Road.
