= Croydon Underpass =

Underpass in Croydon, London

Coordinates: 51.3741°N 0.0968°W

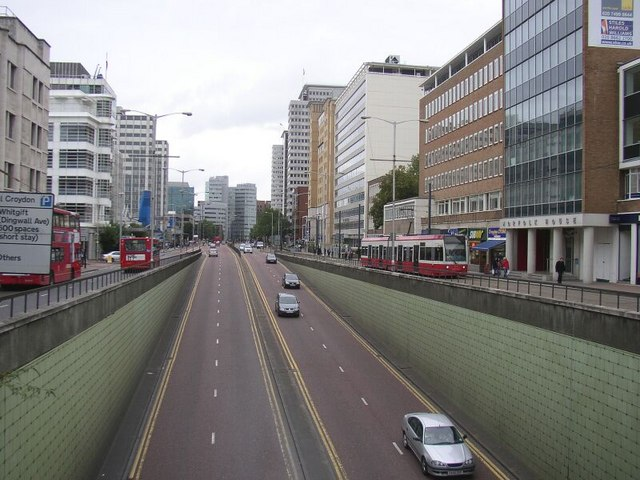
View of the underpass

Croydon Underpass is an underpass located in Croydon, London, England. The road is part of the A212 which stretches from Catford to Forestdale. The underpass was constructed beneath the junction of George Street and Wellesley Road/Park Lane in the early 1960s. The underpass was built mainly to prevent traffic congestion on Park Lane above the underpass.

Local landmark the Nestlé Tower (otherwise known as St George's House) is beside the underpass, opposite the Fairfield Halls. Further along Travelodge sits opposite the Whitgift Centre.

The Croydon Flyover is nearby.
