= Ruskin House =

Grade II listed house in London Borough of Croydon, United kingdom

Coordinates: 51°22′3″N 0°5′48″W

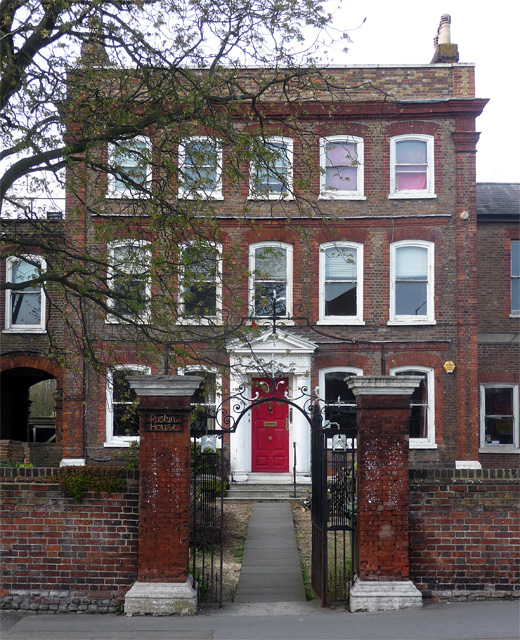

General information
- Location: 23 Coombe Road, Croydon, CR0 1BD
- Year built: Georgian era
- Inaugurated: 1967
- Owner: Ruskin House Committee

Other information
- Parking: On street
- Public transit: South Crodon

Website
- Ruskin House Social Club, Croydon on Facebook

Ruskin House, situated in its own grounds on Coombe Road, Croydon, South London, has been a centre of Britain's progressive movements for a century. It is the headquarters of the Communist Party of Britain and Croydon's Labour, Trade Union and Co-operative movements and is itself a co-operative with shareholders from organisations across the four movements.

== Ruskin House timeline ==
=== The first Ruskin House ===
In the nineteenth century, Croydon was a bustling commercial centre in Surrey but in close proximity to London. It was said that, at the turn of the twentieth century, approximately £10,000 was spent in Croydon's taverns and inns every week. For the early labour movement, then, it was natural to meet in the town's public houses, in this environment. However, the temperance movement was equally strong, and Georgina King Lewis, a keen member of the Croydon United Temperance Council, took it upon herself to establish a dry centre for the labour movement.

Named after John Ruskin, the first Ruskin House was highly successful. It was described as one of the greatest temperance achievements in the history of Croydon. Meetings took place every night wherever space was available. Indeed, requests for meeting space were frequently turned down. Many trade union branches, friendly societies and the Labour Party all held their meetings here.

=== The second Ruskin House ===
By the end of the First World War, the local labour movement had far outgrown its main premises. Therefore, in 1919, a private residence named 'Netherton' on Wellesley Road was bought by the Ruskin House committee. In the 1920s, the Labour Party employed full-time staff in the building. Later, in the 1930s and 1940s, whist drives, socials and dances, political rallies and meetings, and even a Ruskin Repertory Theatre were based in the building. The Young Communist League held its meetings in the building. In the 1960s, Croydon's centre underwent massive reconstruction, and the second Ruskin House was demolished.

=== The current Ruskin House ===
In 1966, a well-proportioned Georgian townhouse in Coombe Road was purchased by the Ruskin House committee. It had formerly been the home of an Italian vice-consul and a private prep school. It was officially opened in 1967 by the then Labour Prime Minister, Harold Wilson. With a large, walled garden, the building is in pleasant surroundings. Far removed from the original dry Ruskin House, the current building has its own bar. Today, Ruskin House continues to serve as the headquarters of the Communist Party of Britain, Croydon Labour Party, and the local trade union movements and Co-operative movements. Geraint Davies, the MP for Croydon Central until 2005, also had offices in the building.

== Other tenants ==
Ruskin House serves as a launchpad and maildrop for other businesses, if the aims of the owners coincide with the aims of the child organisation. Some of the other tenants have included:

- NEW RUSKIN HOUSE (CROYDON) CLUB LIMITED
- BCCM Ministries, a Baptist church
- Starfootball LTD - BTW-Zoeken.nl
- South Of The River Investments Limited
- IBFS Consulting Limited
- Brixton Splash Ltd
- Rise Up Group Ltd
- Walther W. Limited
- BR. Cranston Limited
- African Holocaust Foundation
- My Tribe Ltd
- Hatjab Ltd
- Starcricket Ltd
- Slavery Remembrance Ltd
- SKM Holdings Ltd
