= John Stoughton =

English Nonconformist minister and historian (1807–1897)

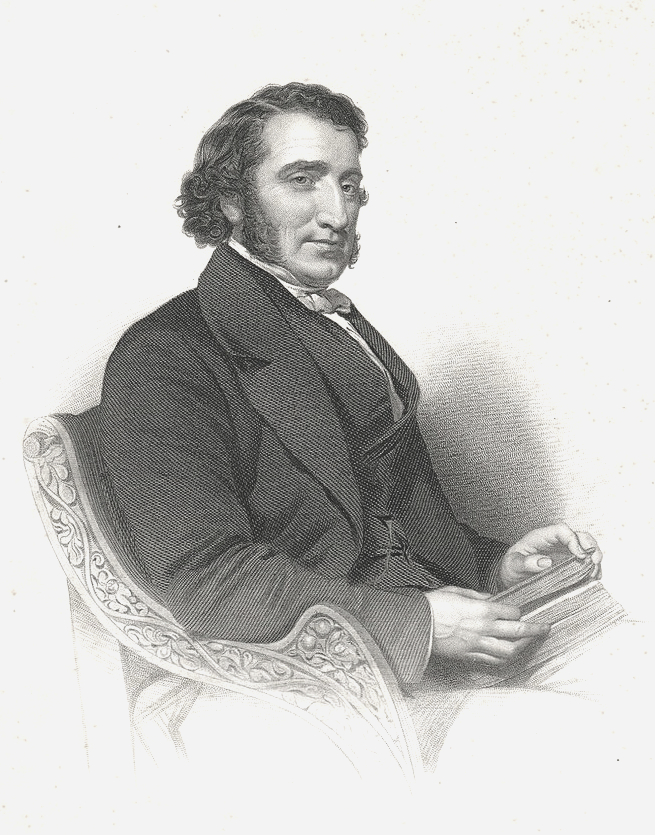
John Stoughton, engraving c.1840

John Stoughton (18 November 1807 – 24 October 1897) was an English Nonconformist minister and historian.

== Life ==
He was born at Norwich. His father was an Episcopalian, his mother a member of the Religious Society of Friends. Stoughton was educated at Norwich Grammar School, and, after an interval of legal study, at Highbury Congregational College. In 1833 he became minister at Windsor, in 1843 at Kensington; in 1856 he was elected chairman of the Congregational Union. From 1872 to 1884 he was professor of historical theology in New College, Hampstead.

Stoughton contributed an account of Nonconformist modes of celebrating the Lord's Supper to the ritual commission of 1870, arranged a conference on co-operation between Anglicans and dissenters (presided over by Archbishop Tait) in 1876, was one of Dean Stanley's lecturers in Westminster Abbey and a pall-bearer at his funeral. He was elected to the Athenaeum Club in 1874 on the nomination of Matthew Arnold. He died at Ealing on 24 October 1897.

== Works ==
Stoughton wrote works of English religious history:

- Church and State 1660–1663 (London, 1862)
- Ecclesiastical History of England (4 vols, London,1870)
- Religion in England under Queen Anne and the Georges (2 vols, 1878)
- Religion in England from 1800 to 1880 (2 vols, 1884)

He also wrote more popular works, among which were Homes and Haunts of Luther (1875), Footprints of Italian Reformers (1881), and The Spanish Reformers (1883), Our English Bible: its translations and translators. His Recollections of a Long Life (1894) was autobiographical.
