= Croydon Flyover =

Overpass in Croydon, London

Coordinates: 51.3693°N 0.1033°W

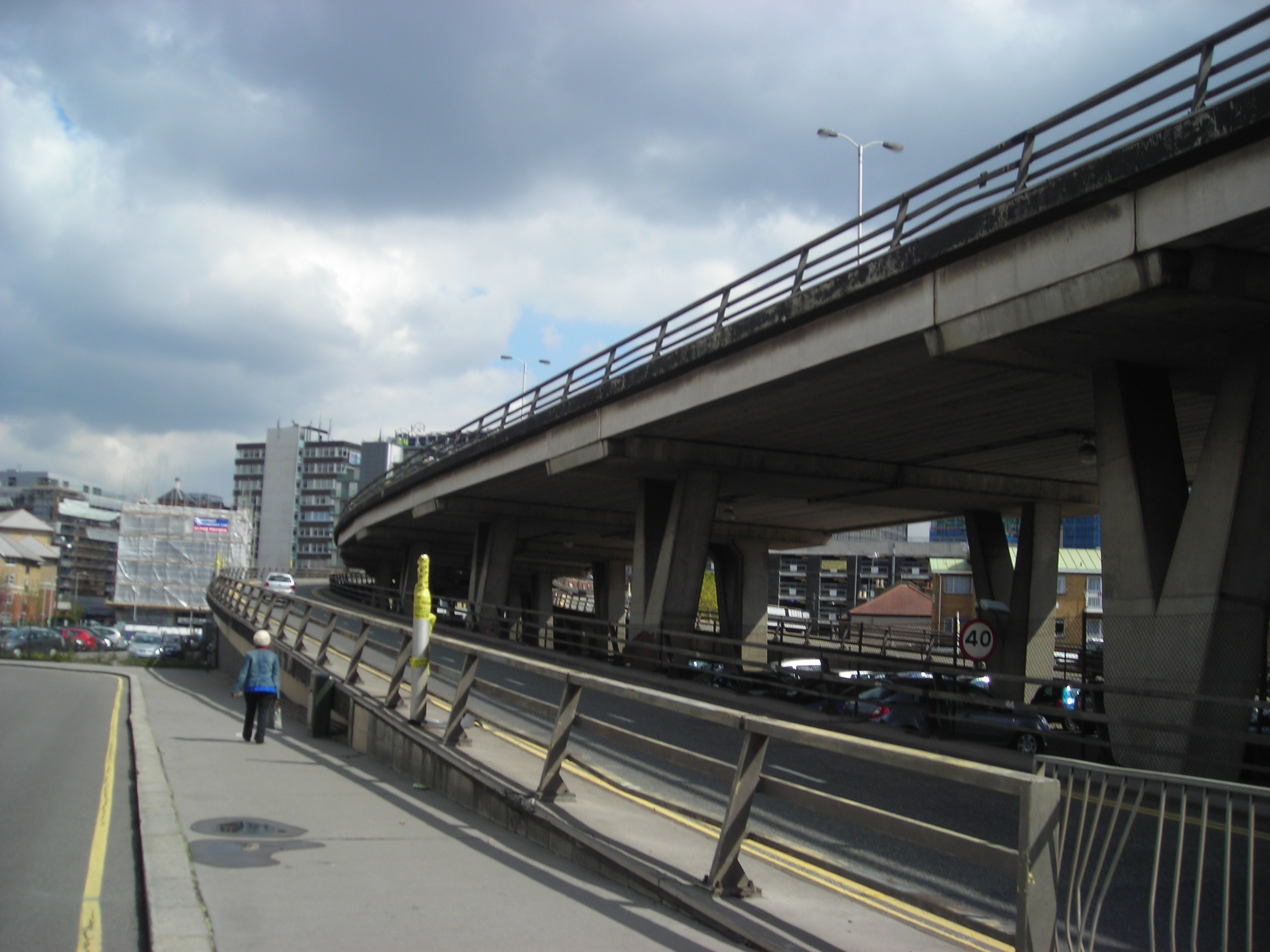
A slip road at a junction with Old Town heading up onto the flyover.

The Croydon Flyover is an overpass located in Croydon, London, England. It is part of the A232 road which connects Orpington with Ewell. The flyover connects Park Lane and the Croydon Underpass, on the A212 road with Duppas Hill Road. It crosses over the A236 Old Town and Southbridge Road, and the A212 Lower Coombe Street, as well as Croydon High Street near Croydon Clocktower.

The flyover was constructed as part of an unfinished ring road scheme conceived in the Croydon Plan of 1951 and was opened in 1969.

Landmarks passed on the flyover include the Fairfield Halls, a theatre and arts centre, Wandle Road multi-storey car park, and Centrale shopping centre is within sight.

The nearest tube station is Morden, six miles to the north-west, although there is a Tramlink connection from Croydon to the District line terminus at Wimbledon.

The flyover was used as a filming location in Danny Boyle's 2002 horror movie 28 Days Later, although the scene was not used.

== See also ==
- Croydon Underpass
- List of bridges in London
