= Petherick =

Petherick (/ˈpɛðərɪk/ PEDH-ə-rik) may refer to:

== People ==
- Alice Hext (1865–1939), née Petherick, Cornish landowner
- Edward Petherick (1847–1917), Australian book collector
- Horace William Petherick (1839-1919). A British artist, book illustrator, violin enthusiast and father of Rosa C. Petherick
- John Petherick (1813–1882), Welsh traveller
- Karin Petherick (1929–2009), British academic and translator of Swedish
- Maurice Petherick (1894–1985), British politician
- Peter Petherick (1942–2015), New Zealand cricketer
- Richard Petherick (born 1986), New Zealand hockey player
- Rosa C. Petherick (1871–1931), British book illustrator
- Vernon Petherick (1876–1945), Australian politician

== Places ==
- Hundred of Petherick, a cadastral unit in South Australia
  - Petherick, South Australia, a locality
- Little Petherick, a village and civil parish in Cornwall, England
