= Cremona Society =

Muisc group in London, England

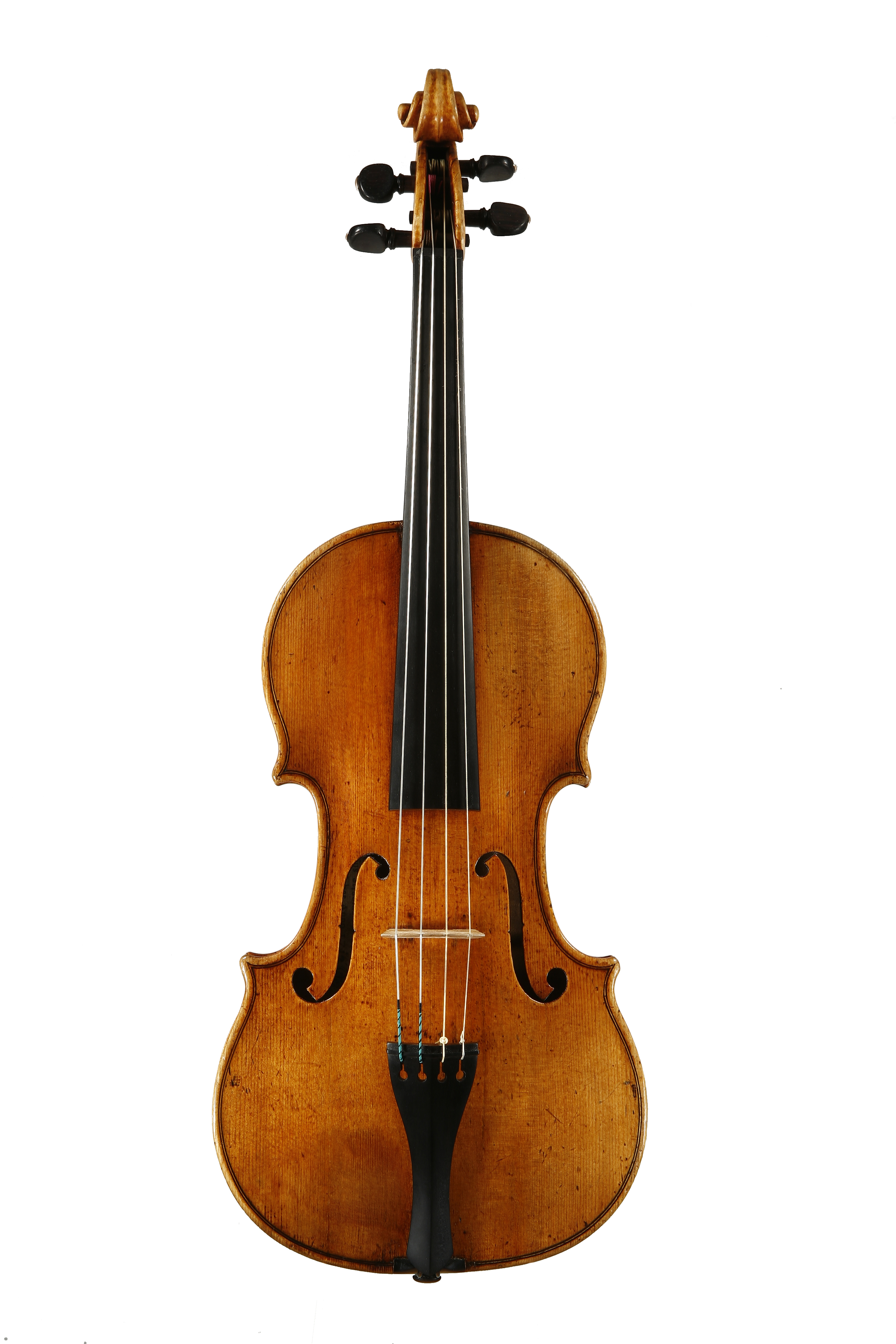
Le Brun Stradivari violin of 1712, previously owned and played by Niccolo Paganini

The Cremona Society of London was founded in 1886 for the study of the violin and other stringed instruments.

== The name ==
The Society was named after the Cremona region of Italy which had a long tradition of violin making, and from which some the greatest stringed instrument makers such as Antonio Stradivari and Giuseppe Guarneri had come. The name is not unique. There was a Berlin Cremona Society, a Boston Cremona Society, and the Bard Conservatory has a Cremona Society, open to those who loan or donate a violin to the Conservatory.

== Monthly meetings and transactions ==
The society held monthly meetings from October to June. Membership was ten shillings and sixpence a year, half a guinea. Who's Who in Music and stated that the Society published the transactions annually. However, the British Library holds one volume (Volume One) of the Transactions, published in 1906, when the Society was twenty years old, so the amition of annual publishing had not been met. The typical format for the monthly meeting was a lecture presenting a paper, often on some technical aspect of violin making. The following will give a flavour of the meetings:

- February, 1906: Vincent J. Cooper presented a paper on The Lost Secret of the Old Italian Varnishes. As this topic was of interest to artists as well as musicians and member of the Royal Academy turned up, making this the best attended meeting of the season. The second half of the evening was the usual concert with Jan Hambourg and Guilderoy Scott doing the honours.
- March, 1906: C. W. English presented a presented a paper on Francesco Stradivari, Antonio's son, and exhibited nearly twenty different instrument made by him. The musical honors were provided by Herbert Walenn and the Petherick Quartet (composed of Rosa C. Petherick's four sisters).
- April, 1906. The meeting was to hear from Philip A. Robson on bows.
- December, 1907: E. C. Rimington read a paper entitled Fiddle Facts and Fancies. He then made some technical suggestions for mechanical improvements in violins, before moving on to discuss some old violin makers. After the paper Heinrich Dittmar, a violin treacher, delighted the audience with violin solos.
- April, 1907: Vincent J Cooper was to present a paper on The Common Sense of Old Violins.

From the discussions detailed in the reports of the meetings, the topics were examined in a thorough and professional way and were not light entertainment by any means. For example, the presentation on varnish discussed not only the composition of the varnish, and the number of layers, but also the important issue of priming of the wood for the varnish. The speaker informed the audience that the difference between the so-called hard and soft varnishes was not in the materials, but in the way that the gum had liquid added to it when in solution. It was a thoroughly technical discussion. The music offered was also of the first quality, with performers including leading soloists, first violins and so on.

== Officers ==
Edward John Payne was elected the first president in 1889. He was a talented amateur musician who wrote on musical topics, including writing articles for Grove's Dictionary of Music and Musicians. His love of music could be seen in his home life, where he repeatedly played scales to his daughter Cecilia at two years of age so that she could develop perfect pitch. Payne was one of those involved in the movement to reintroduce the Viol de gamba and the Viola d'amore, both of which he could play well. Payne drowned in a canal near his home at Wendover on boxing day in 1904.

Horace William Petherick, the noted artist, illustrator and violin expert was initially the vice-president of the Cremona Society, and described himself as such in his books on Antonio Stradivari and on violin repair. However, by 1913, Who's Who in Music was describing him as the president of the society. Green says that Samuel Coleridge-Taylor, a member of the society, was one of the seven vice-presidents when Petherick was president.

== The Giuseppe Guarneri Cello ==
Bartholomeo Giuseppe Guarneri was a luthier from the Guarneri Family of Cremona. He was also known as Joseph Guarnerius and by the sobriquet of del Gesù (of Jesus) because he began to add a religious symbol after his name 1739. At the ordinary monthly meeting of the Society on 4 May 1906, members were promised a treat at the end of the month, with a special meeting on 30 May, at which a paper dealing with the discovery of the only known violoncello (the full name for the cello) by del Gesù. The event was also announced in The Academy with the information that the renowned cellist and teacher Herbert Walenn would play the instrument.

The Cello was exhibited and the August edition of The Strad reproduced a photograph of the front and back of the cello, and printed: a report from Vincent J. Cooper on the cello; a memo from Horace Petherick stating that this is the only known violoncello by del Gesù; and a certificate by Petherick that in his opinion, the cello was the work of del Gesù. All of these three documents were dated 28 April 1906. Petherick's position as an expert on del Gesù was established by his having published a book on his work in press at the time.

However, before The Strad could report on the meeting, Truth, a British weekly known for exposing frauds of all kinds, ran a series of columns on the cello and on the Cremona Society:

- On 6 June 1906, Truth ridiculed the idea that the cello was by del Gesù, especially given that the Cooper brothers were "so strangely reticent as to the antecedents of the instrument". Truth then goes on to note that there are those who allege that the Society is not made up of "disinterested connoisseurs and amateurs" but was "a clever trade organisation masquerading as an artistic association".
- On 13 June 1906, Truth wrote a long column about the Society, repeating the earlier criticisms. Truth then said that the Society was quite a respectable affair when it was founded in 1886, but then petered out until the winter of 1904-05 when it was resuscitated by Vincent Cooper, a violin dealer in partnership with his brother. Truth went on to state that three partners of the auctioneering firm that eventually sold the cello were all committee members of the society, as were both Coopers and their brother-in-law. Finally, the article said that whether the cello was genuine was not of real interest, but whether the Society, as presently constituted, was a body to which the very respectable vice-presidents would wish to belong. Truth also pointed out that the attention gained for the cello through presentation at the Society meant that it got far more attention that it would have gained had it initially been presented at auction in the normal way.
- On 27 June 1906, Truth reports having received a letter from A. Daily Cooper, Vincent's brother and business partner, which took exception to the earlier columns in Truth. Saying that the letter provides a lot of technical detail about the cello to prove its authenticity, it notes that the two critical questions were not answered: where did the cello come from and how much did it cost?

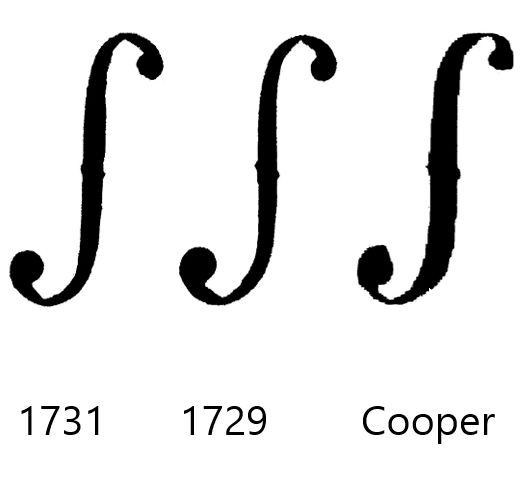
Comparison of the f-holes of the two cellos believed to have been finished by del Gesù compared with the cello produced by Cooper at the Cremona Society meeting.

In The Strad's September 1906 edition there was a letter from F. W. Chanot defending the art dealers in general and saying that so little was known of del Gesù's early life "that it would be rash to say absolutely that he never made a cello". The letter quotes from the Truth article of 13 June, and goes on to state that the Truth journalist responsible is himself a member of the Society. This assertion is supported by the appearance of a report on the February meeting of the Society in Truth earlier in the year.

More important, perhaps, was the communication, in the same issue, from the editor of "The Strad" that: "At a recent committee meeting of the Cremona Society it was decided that on one connected with the trade should be a member of the committee or an officer of the society". The only further comment on the matter was a letter in the October Strad from J. W. Adamson, saying that he had once owned a violoncello by del Gesù but had sold it and was wondering if this was the instrument in question. That appears to have closed the matter.

Was the cello really by Gesù? The Australian Chamber Orchestra states that to this day there are only two cellos known to have been completed by del Gesù. Only two cellos are listed in the Cozio Archive of musical instruments at Tarisio.com as have been, at least in part, the work of del Gesù. In both cases, he is thought to have finished cellos that had been begun by his father. These are:

- Giuseppe Guarneri 'filius Andreae', Cremona, 1729, Cozio 43989, donated to the Australian Chamber Orchestra in 2007, and now played by Julian Thompson.
- Bartolomeo Giuseppe Guarneri 'del Gesù', Cremona, 1731, the 'Messeas' , Cozio 40383, Sold anonymously in 2013.

The provenance of neither of these, as presented in the Cozio archive, allows for discovery in London in 1906. Further, the photographs published at the time show that the cello produced by Cooper had significantly narrower "wings" (the tangs that form the inside of the scrolls at the top and bottom of the f-holes) than can be seen in the photographs of the two cellos listed in the Cozio archive.

== Court actions for misrepresentation and fraud ==
The Cremona Society and some of its officer were embroiled in controversy again two years later. Dr. Hitchcock bought a violin certified by Horace Petherick to be the work of Petrus Guarnerius (there were two such luthiers: one the uncle of del Gesù and the other his brother - the media coverage does not make clear which). However, he found that the violin was not as represented and took the seller to court to recover his money. Alfred Hill of W. E. Hill & Sons gave evidence that the violin was in fact French. Petherick still maintained that it was by Guarnerius, but made no serious effort to rebut Hill's testimony. The Defence argues that they gave no guarantee, but the jury found against them and awarded damage to Dr Hitchcock.

Truth noted that Vincent J. Cooper bought the violin initially and sold it to the defendants, who in turn sold it on to Hitchcock and that Cooper and Petherick, together with the defendant's buyer, were all members of the Cremona society. The media coverage expressed amusement that the certificate from Petherick was written on parchment "presumably to add fictitious importance to an otherwise worthless document". Despite the decision announced in The Strad in September 1906 that members of the trade could no longer be committee members or officers, Mr Cooper, a violin dealer, was still the Honorary Secretary.

Hermann recalled a previous case about a year previously in which Joseph Chanot relied on Petherick's certification of two violincellos to defend himself from an action by the purchaser. In that case, also, the court accepted the view of the expert from E.W. Hill & Sons and found against Chanot.

A more serious case arose at the end of June, when Mr. English sued Vincent Cooper for fraud, in that he had sold English a violin claiming that it was by del Gesù. The two had met at the Cremona Society, adding weight to the suggestion in Truth that dealers were making use of the Society for their own ends. Mr Cooper had certified the origin of the violin himself, even giving it the supposedly traditional nickname of "giant". Petherick appeared in court to support the contention that it was by del Gesù and W.E. Hill & Sons maintained that it was not. However, the jury found against Cooper and awarded damages to English. Truth noted that during cross examination, several of the unfavourable comments that Truth had previously made about the nature of the Cremona Society, were put to Cooper.

The assessment of Chevalet on the case was that the results of the trial should dispose once and for all of Mr Cooper's firm and of "the self-styled expert" Peterick. This was the third case in a year or so in which a court had found against the opinion on provenance given by Petherick. Cooper, the honorary secretary, was found guilty of fraud. The last meeting of the Cremona Society to be reported in The Strad was that of 7 May 1908, appearing in the June 1908 issue. The Strad printed no more Cremona Society columns after June 1908, when Cooper lost the fraud case. The Society would have been quiet for the summer in any case, although there was usually a meeting in June.

== See also ==
- Category:Musical groups established in 1886
