= The Humorous Magistrate =

The Humorous Magistrate (c. 1635-40) is a 17th-century country comedy in five acts discovered by the collector Edgar Osborne, who found the manuscript in a sale at Watnall Hall in Nottinghamshire, England in 1947. It was later sold to the University of Calgary in 1972. The play exists in two manuscripts and shows clear signs of authorial revision.

== Manuscripts ==
In 1972, the University of Calgary acquired Edgar Osborne's collection of rare books and manuscripts, including The Humorous Magistrate (MsC132.27). The manuscript when acquired was untitled, dateless, and authorless. Under the direction of Professor Mary Polito, the manuscript was dated to the seventeenth-century and was determined to have been written near or after 1640 due to political and socio-economic references within the text. After workshop performances in association with the University of Calgary drama department, the Calgary manuscript was linked to another untitled manuscript found in Arbury Hall, Warwickshire, United Kingdom in 2004. These are the only two known extant manuscripts of The Humorous Magistrate. The Arbury manuscript is an earlier version of the Osborne, containing more amendments and approximately ten thousand more words. The two manuscripts bear scribal similarities, and ongoing research indicates that the manuscripts were both written by John Newdigate III. Newdigate was an avid theatregoer, who wrote poetry and lived in Arbury Hall.

== Summary ==
The play follows a Justice of the Peace named Thrifty, his daughter Constance, and her suitor Christopher Spruce, as well as their family, friends, and servants. The conventional romance of Constance and Spruce is paired with the satirization of judicial corruption and ineptitude as Thrifty abuses his role as Justice of the Peace. Subplots include the farcical shaming of Peter's wife Jenet, two other romantic plots, and the tropes of shepherds and thieves. In The Humorous Magistrate satire, romance, farce, and nonsensical narratives are combined to demonstrate the political and social unrest of the period while also acting as a self-aware comedic outlet.

The Humorous Magistrate frequently uses allusion. Many of these allusions can be traced back to written works, while others incorporate more time-relevant, cultural references, such as Thrifty and Peter's argument about the Etcetera oath. Of all of the types of allusions used within the play, references to Greek mythology are the most common; this can be seen through characters such as Wild – who is shown invoking Hymen (god) and Hermes for good luck – and Mr. Wellcom – who refers to the prophetess Cassandra. The play also contains allusions to the Bible and occasionally uses religious diction. Reappearing themes in the play include the use of judicial language, religious language, and mentions of the natural world. The natural world, more generally, includes references to nature as well as medicinal practices and remedies.

== Performance ==
Performance considerations include a simple stage where actors can exit from both wings, as stage directions in the play are referred to as “door” and “other door.” Often several characters are on stage at once; the final scene requires space to accommodate twenty actors. The script suggests four sets: Thrifty's office, Mistress Mumble's home, countryside, and a town square. The Humorous Magistrate script has twenty-seven speaking roles, plus shepherds, constables, and musicians. There are opportunities for doubling, such as thieves for shepherds.

Props explicitly mentioned in stage directions are simple, and could be concrete or conceptual: an almanac, letters, tankard, money, fiddles, knives, pistols, jewels, hats, rope, carts, wig and powder, handkerchiefs, nux vomica, staff, rings, doublet, breeches, chairs, pens, a box of bottles, chickens and capons, food, and a cup of sack (wine). Specific costumes are not referenced other than tuff taffeta jerkin and doublet. Musically, the script refers to lute, drums, and vocals for one song, K. Arthur.

The Humorous Magistrate is not considered a closet drama but no evidence exists of its performance in the 17th century. A University of Calgary 2005 performance, directed by Barry Yzereef as “Marriage Upon Marriage,” used contemporary costumes including leather jackets, jeans, toques, and ball caps. Characters were embellished with cigars, lipstick, suitcases, drums, glasses of whiskey, and the replacement of traditional instruments with a guitar. Sexual humor was explicit through actors’ carnal mimicry and gestures; Yzereef focused on the play's overarching theme of complexities of the law but also added a comedic take with music from the TV series Ally McBeal.

The University of Calgary's 2010 performance, directed by Patrick Finn, became the first full-stage production in nearly 400 years. Designers constructed 17th-century costumes, and musical instrumentation was period-specific, performed by university-level musicians. A fight coordinator enhanced physical comedy, while specific sound cues were created for Mistress Mumbles’ and Thrifty's flatulence. The production borrowed the prologue and epilogue from the play's earlier Arbury Hall draft. The backdrops included a painted forest and walls of windows for the town square.
