= List of listed buildings in Kennoway, Fife =

This is a list of listed buildings in the parish of Kennoway in Fife, Scotland.

== List ==
Name	Location	Date listed	Grid ref. (Note: Sometimes known as OSGB36, the grid reference (where provided) is based on the British national grid reference system used by the Ordnance Survey. • "Guide to National Grid". Ordnance Survey. • "Get-a-map". Ordnance Survey.)	Geo-coordinates	Notes	LB number (Note: Historic Environment Scotland assign a unique alphanumeric identifier to each designated site in Scotland, for listed buildings this always begins with "LB", for example "LB12345".)	Image
Kingsdale House Including Ancillary Buildings And Walled Garden				56°12′15″N 3°03′35″W	Category B	10009	Upload Photo
Kennoway Village, Cupar Road, Arnot Gospel Hall With Boundary Walls				56°12′51″N 3°02′48″W	Category B	10004	Upload Photo
Kennoway Village, Cupar Road, Hawfield House With Boundary Walls And Gatepiers				56°12′51″N 3°02′49″W	Category B	10005	Upload Photo
Kennoway Village, The Causeway (East Side), Garage At The Cottage				56°12′29″N 3°03′01″W	Category C(S)	10017	Upload Photo
Auchtermairnie Bridge Over Kennoway Burn				56°12′53″N 3°03′46″W	Category C(S)	10008	Upload Photo
Kennoway Village, The Causeway (West Side), Forbes Cottage With Boundary Walls				56°12′31″N 3°03′00″W	Category C(S)	10022	Upload Photo
Star, East End, Sawmill Cottage With Boundary Wall				56°13′04″N 3°05′43″W	Category C(S)	46718	Upload Photo
Brunton Barns And Brunton Divecot				56°12′24″N 3°07′12″W	Category B	10011	Upload Photo
Kennoway Village, The Causeway (East Side), Fernbank With Boundary Walls				56°12′34″N 3°02′57″W	Category C(S)	10016	Upload Photo
Kennoway Village, The Causeway (West Side), Seton House				56°12′32″N 3°02′59″W	Category B	10020	Upload Photo
Kennoway Village, The Causeway (West Side), Forbes House With Boundary Walls				56°12′31″N 3°02′59″W	Category C(S)	10021	Upload Photo
Kennoway Village, Langside Drive, Ingot Hill House (Former Manse)				56°12′47″N 3°03′01″W	Category B	10014	Upload Photo
Kennoway Village, Cupar Road, War Memorial				56°12′42″N 3°02′55″W	Category C(S)	46713	Upload another image
Kennoway Village, Swan Avenue, Denburn Cottage				56°12′39″N 3°03′00″W	Category C(S)	46714	Upload Photo
Kennoway Village, Leven Road, Kenmont With Boundary Walls And Gatepiers				56°12′35″N 3°02′38″W	Category B	10006	Upload Photo
Newton Hall Steading, Cartshed And Granary				56°12′25″N 3°04′38″W	Category C(S)	46716	Upload Photo
Star, Broomfield Cottage With Boundary Wall				56°13′01″N 3°06′59″W	Category C(S)	46975	Upload Photo
Kennoway Village, Cupar Road, St Kenneth's (Church Of Scotland) Parish Church				56°12′43″N 3°02′55″W	Category B	10013	Upload another image
Kennoway Village, The Causeway (East Side), Old Kennoway Churchyard With Old Session Room And Watch House, Boundary Walls, Gatepiers And Gates				56°12′33″N 3°02′57″W	Category B	10015	Upload Photo
Dalginch Farm Steading With Horse Mill				56°12′32″N 3°06′41″W	Category B	46711	Upload Photo
Kennoway Village, Cupar Road, Cockburn House With Boundary Walls And Gatepiers				56°12′47″N 3°02′49″W	Category B	10003	Upload Photo
Newton Hall				56°12′21″N 3°04′38″W	Category B	10010	Upload Photo
Kennoway Village, The Causeway (West Side), Merkland Cottage And Denview				56°12′30″N 3°03′00″W	Category C(S)	10023	Upload Photo
Dalginch Farmhouse With Boundary Walls				56°12′30″N 3°06′42″W	Category C(S)	46710	Upload Photo
Spa Bridge, Kennoway Den, Kennoway				56°12′30″N 3°03′07″W	Category C(S)	52675	Upload Photo

== Key ==
The scheme for classifying buildings in Scotland is:

- Category A: "buildings of national or international importance, either architectural or historic; or fine, little-altered examples of some particular period, style or building type."
- Category B: "buildings of regional or more than local importance; or major examples of some particular period, style or building type, which may have been altered."
- Category C: "buildings of local importance; lesser examples of any period, style, or building type, as originally constructed or moderately altered; and simple traditional buildings which group well with other listed buildings."

In March 2016 there were 47,288 listed buildings in Scotland. Of these, 8% were Category A, and 50% were Category B, with the remaining 42% being Category C.

== See also ==
- List of listed buildings in Fife
