= Henry Craik =

Henry Craik may refer to:

- Sir Henry Craik, 1st Baronet (1846–1927), Scottish Unionist Member of Parliament 1906–1927
- Sir Henry Duffield Craik (1876–1955), member of the Indian Civil Service during the British Raj
- Henry Craik (evangelist) (1805–1866), Scottish Hebraist, theologian and preacher
