= Horace William Petherick =

Artist and illustrator

William Horace Petherick
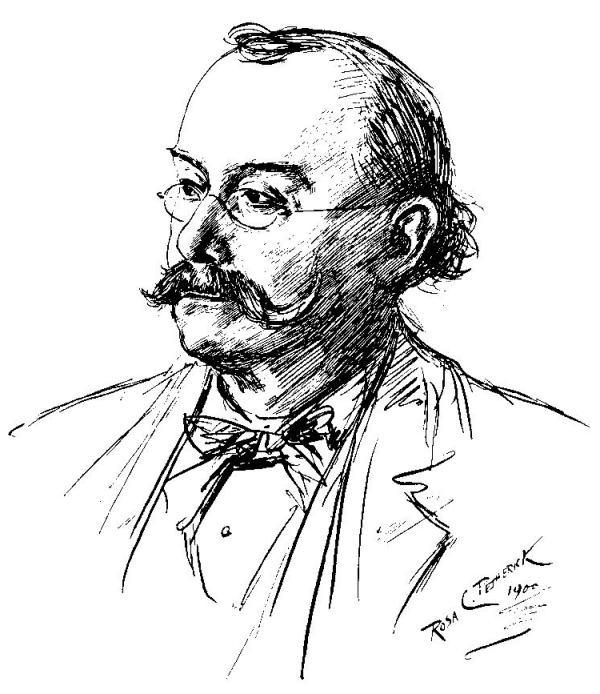
- Petherick illustrated by his daughter, Rosa C. Petherick
- Born: 4 December 1839; St Pancras, London
- Died: 8 March 1919 (aged 79); Addiscombe, Croydon, London
- Other name: Signed his work as H. P. or H. W. P.
- Occupations: Artist, illustrator, musician, violin expert
- Years active: 1860-1890 as illustrator, from 1890 as a violin expert
- Known for: Vice-presidency of the Cremona Society
- Notable work: The repairing and restoration of violins (1903)

Horace William Petherick (1839-1919) was an artist and illustrator, a violin connoisseur, and a writer. As an artist, four of his works are in public collections in the UK; as an illustrator, he illustrated over 100 books, some of which are still in print, and his work can be found in digital collections at the British Library, the Osborne Collection of Early Children's Books, and the Baldwin Library of Historical Children's Literature; as a violin connoisseur, he owned both a Stradivarius and a del Gesù; and as an author, three of his books are still in print.

== Early life and family ==
Petherick was born on 4 December 1838. Very little is known about his early life. He was the third of eight children to tailor William Richard Petherick and Phoebe Mary Ann, née Cooper who had married in St Pancras on 12 April 1835. Two of Horace's siblings died in early childhood.

Petherick was registered on the 1861 census as an artist. He married Clementina Augusta Bewley Bonny (c.1860-1909) and the couple immediately moved to Addiscombe, Surrey, where they remained for the rest of their lives. The couple had seven children, two of whom died in infancy, leaving five girls, of whom one, Rosa Clementina (1872-1931) became an illustrator like her father.

The Annual Review noted on his death that he was an artist of repute who exhibited at the Royal Academy on several occasions. Petherick exhibited to a limited extent. (Note: Petheric exhibited as follows: one work at the Walker Art Gallery, Liverpool, and three works at the Royal Academy.) Four of his works are in public art collections in the UK.

== Work as an illustrator ==
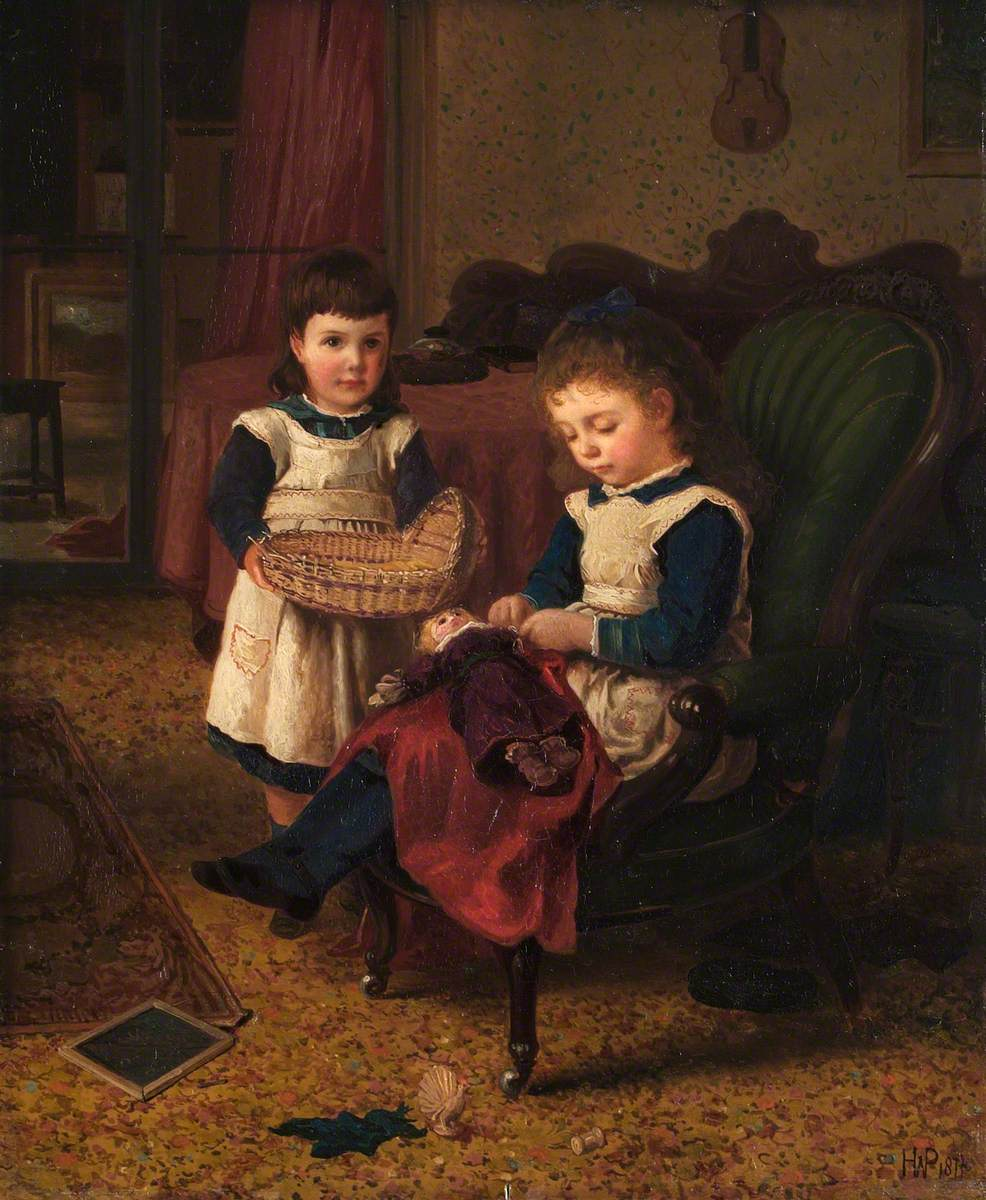
Two Children (1871) by Harold Petherick. Croydon Art Collection.

His first work as an illustrator was in 1868, but it was only in the early 1870s that he started to attract large amounts of work. He illustrated well over 100 books in his career. He illustrated many young children's books, as well as a few books for young adults. He was one of the illustrators for The Savage Club Papers (1897). He acted as technical illustrator for his own books on the violin. From about 1890, he seems to have done less illustration work, and none at all from 1900, except of his own violin books, and violins provided a second career for him.

Writers he illustrated for included:

- Clemens Brentano, a German poet and novelist
- Christabel Rose Coleridge, who wrote improving stories for children
- Harry Collingwood, who wrote boy's adventure stories (no novels illustrated, only serials and short stories).
- Georgiana Marion Craik, who wrote for young women mostly, but also for girls,
- Anna Harriett Drury, who wrote conventional romances as well as books for boys
- Evelyn Everett-Green, who moved from pious stories for children, through historical romances, to adult romances under a range of pseudonyms
- George Manville Fenn, who wrote mainly for young adults
- G.A. Henty, who wrote mainly boys adventure stories set in historical contexts
- Emily Sarah Holt, who wrote mainly on historical themes, often with a strong Protestant religious element
- W.H.G. Kingston, who wrote boy's adventure stories
- L. T. Meade, a prolific Irish writer of stories for girls
- Laura Valentine, who wrote the Aunt Louisa series as well as other books for young children
- Lucy Wheelock, who translated the Swiss stories of Johanna Spyri, as well as writing stories for young children

=== Illustrations by Petherick for the book Hanbury Mills in 1872 ===
These are examples of his illustrations for a book for young adults.

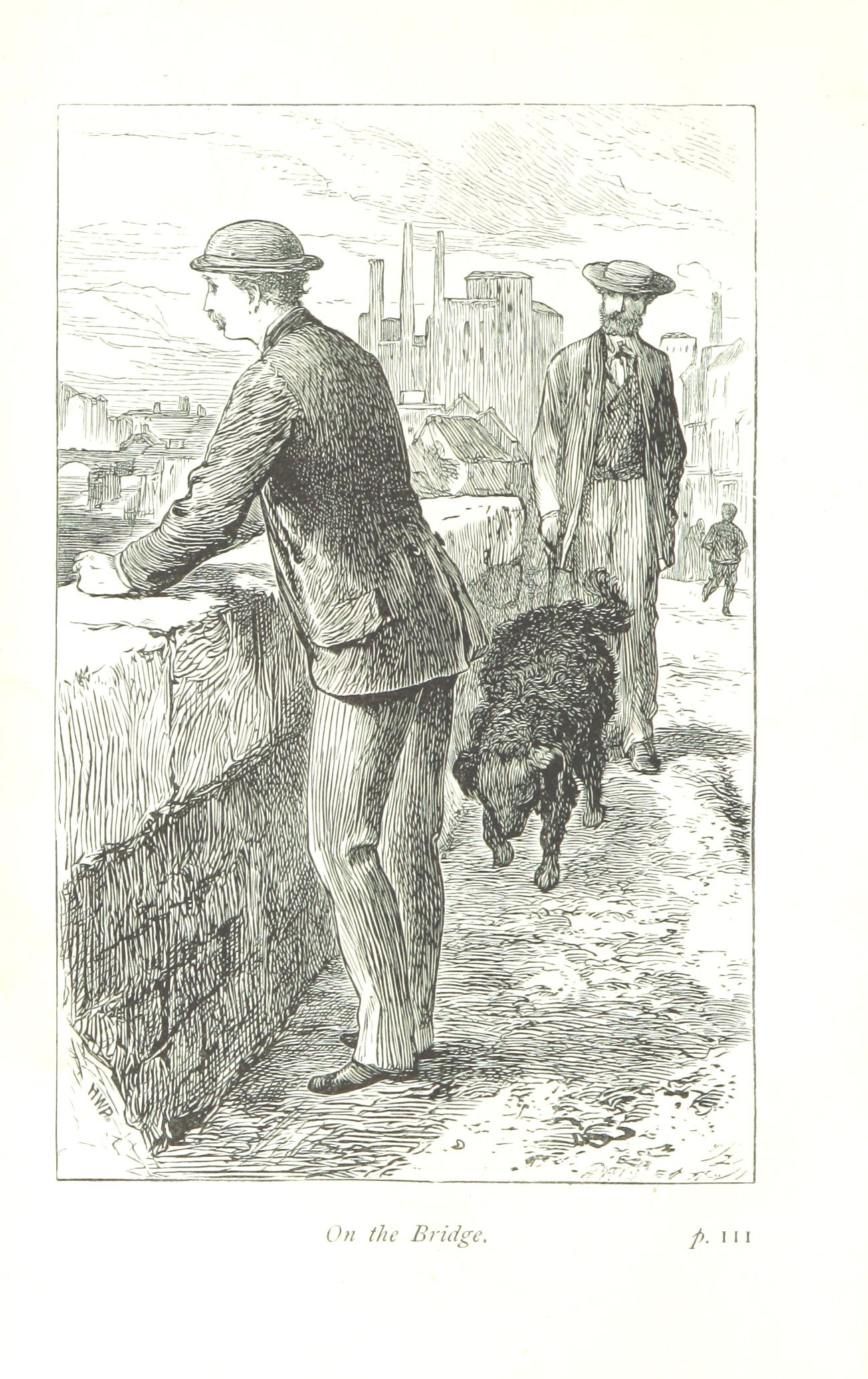
On the Bridge

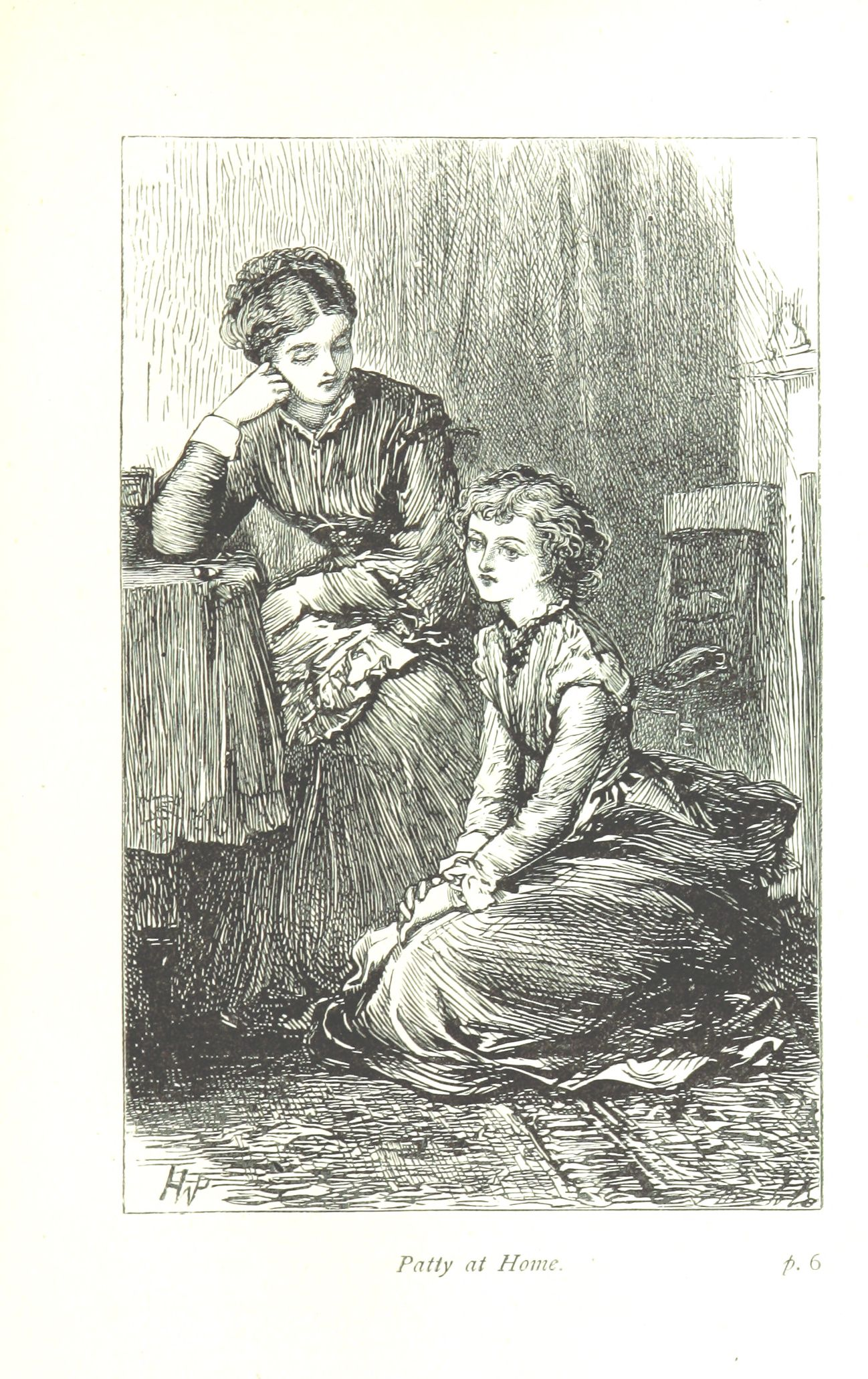
Patty at Home

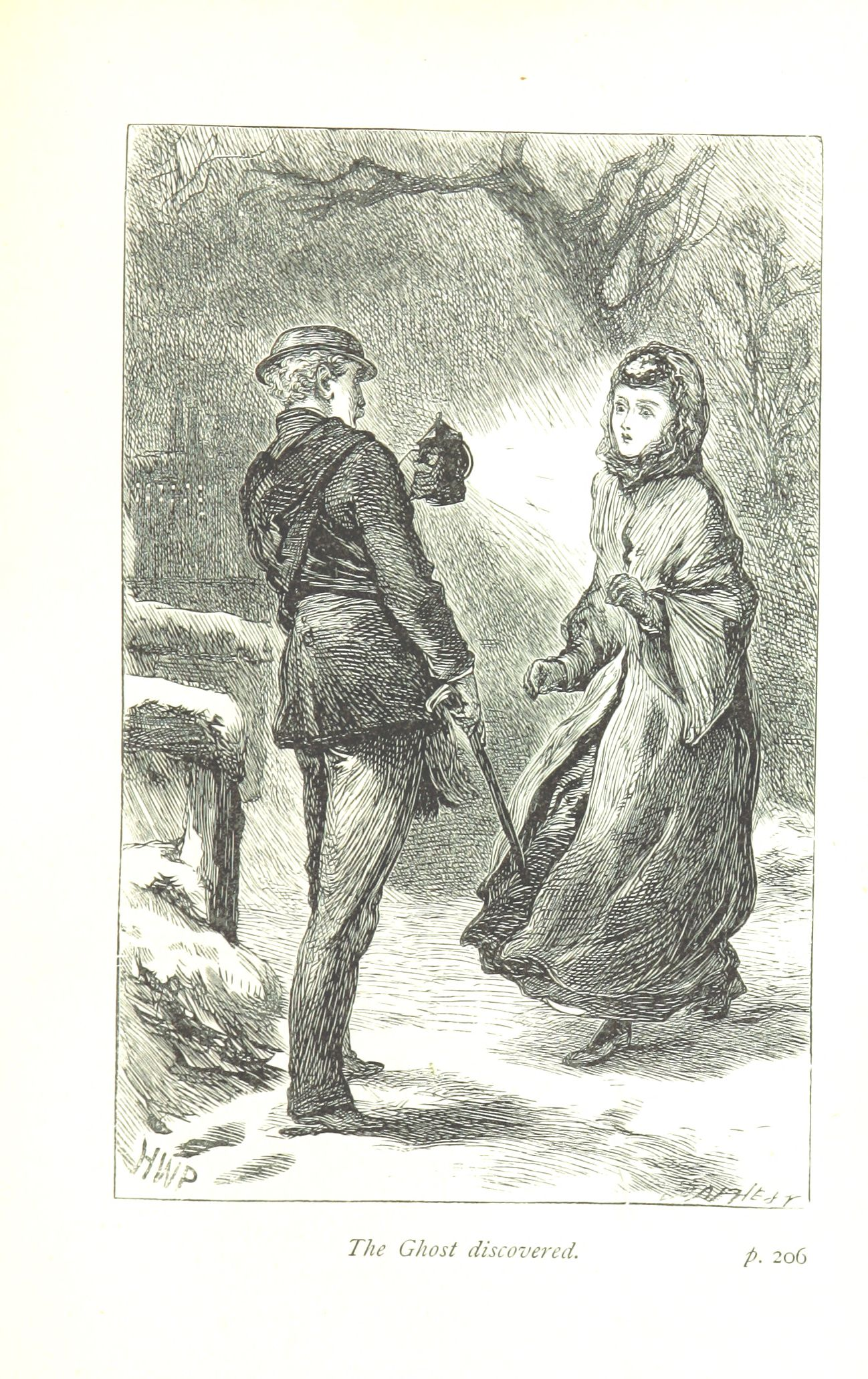
The Ghost Discovered

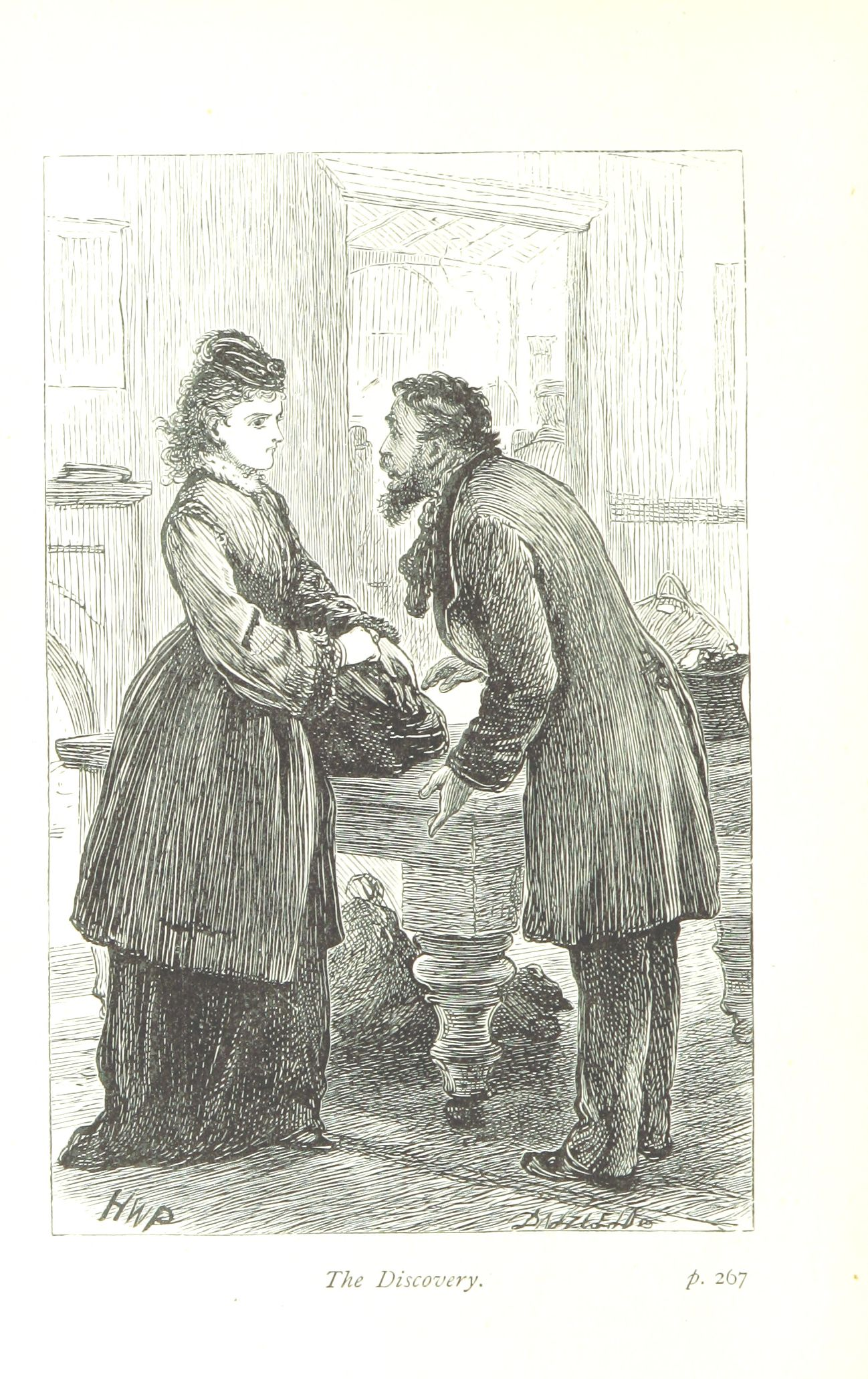
The Discovery

Most book illustrations of the time were in black and white drawings for books for adults or young adults. Colour was only used for books for small children or for the frontispieces of other books. Houfe states that he specialised in children's stories, especially those with figures in costume. Petherick worked on several full colour books, including London Characters (1875) by Laura Valentine which showed 36 different occupations in London. Twenty-nine of the 11 x 7 cm vignettes on which the book was based were sold for £1,200 in 2007.

=== Illustrations by Petherick for the book My Dog Tray in c.1880 ===
These are examples of his coloured illustrations for young children.

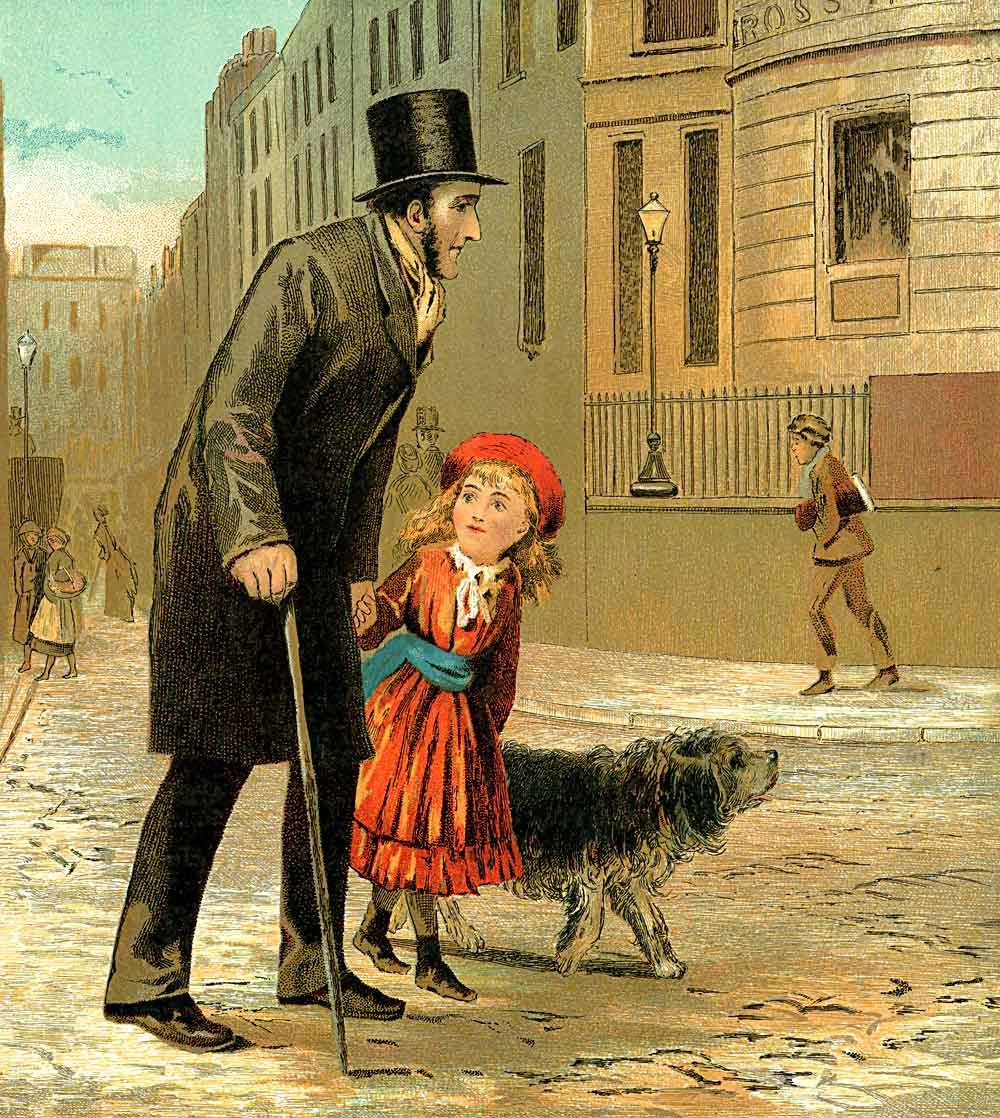
Nell walks to the hospital with her dying father and her dog Tray.

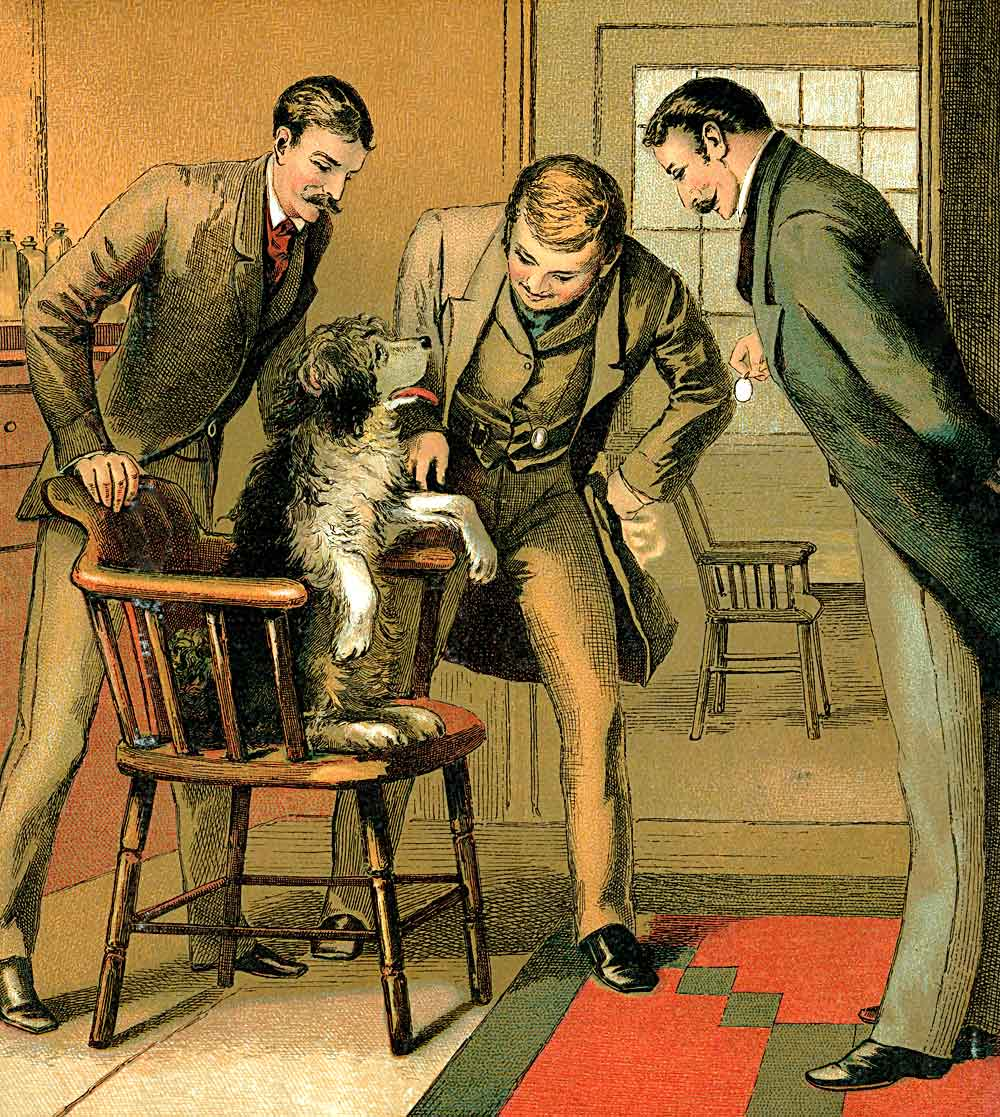
Tray visits the hospital to show his broken paw to the doctors.

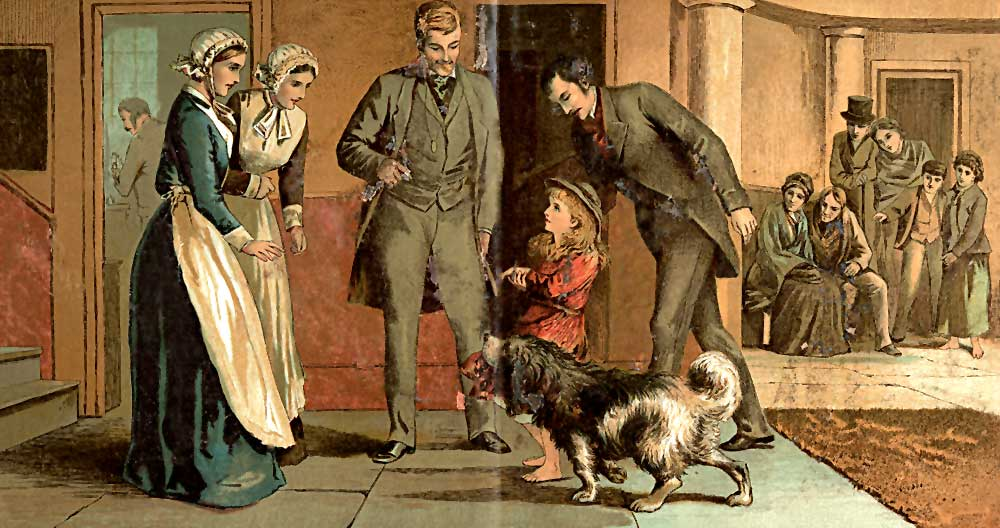
Nell visits the hospital to show her broken arm to the doctors.

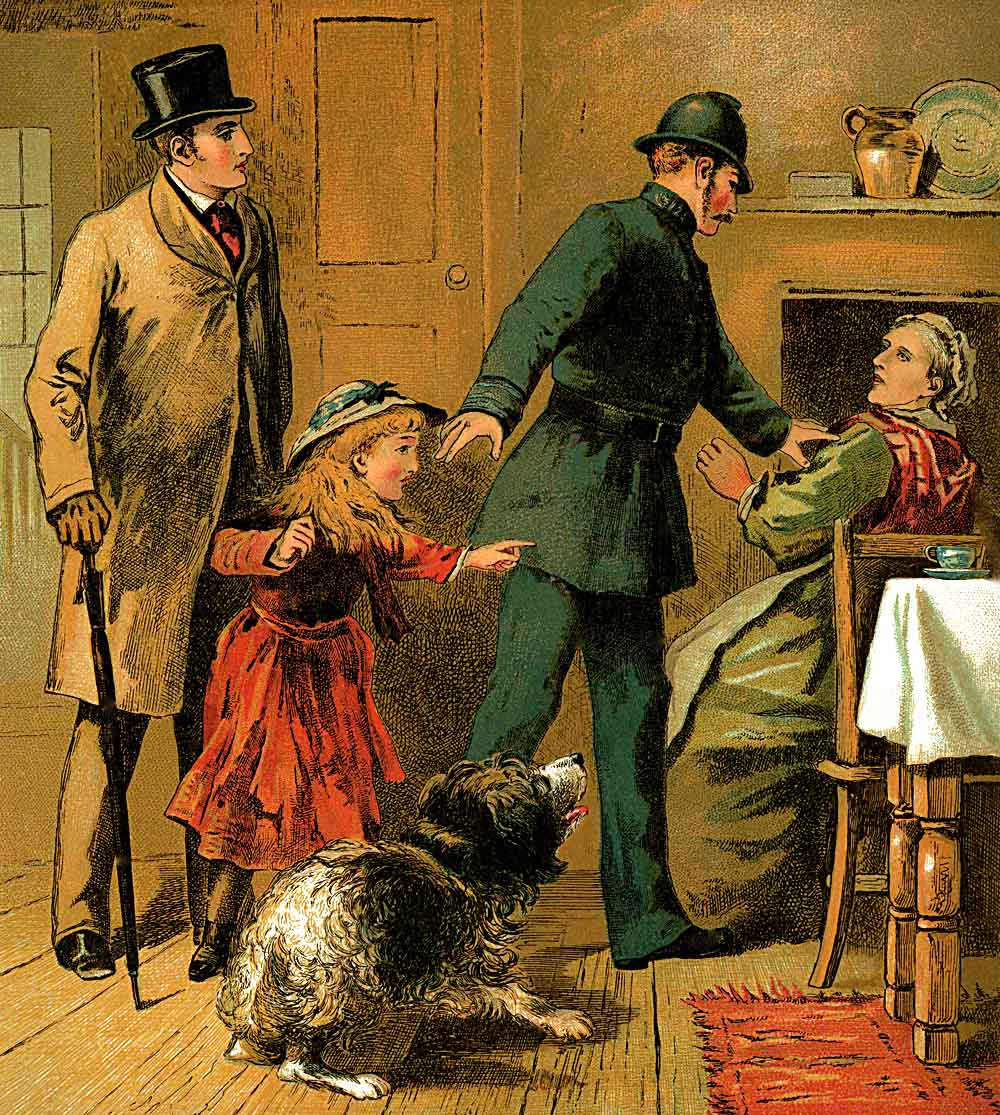
The police arrest Nell's former landlady after it is discovered that she stole the money left for Nell by her father.

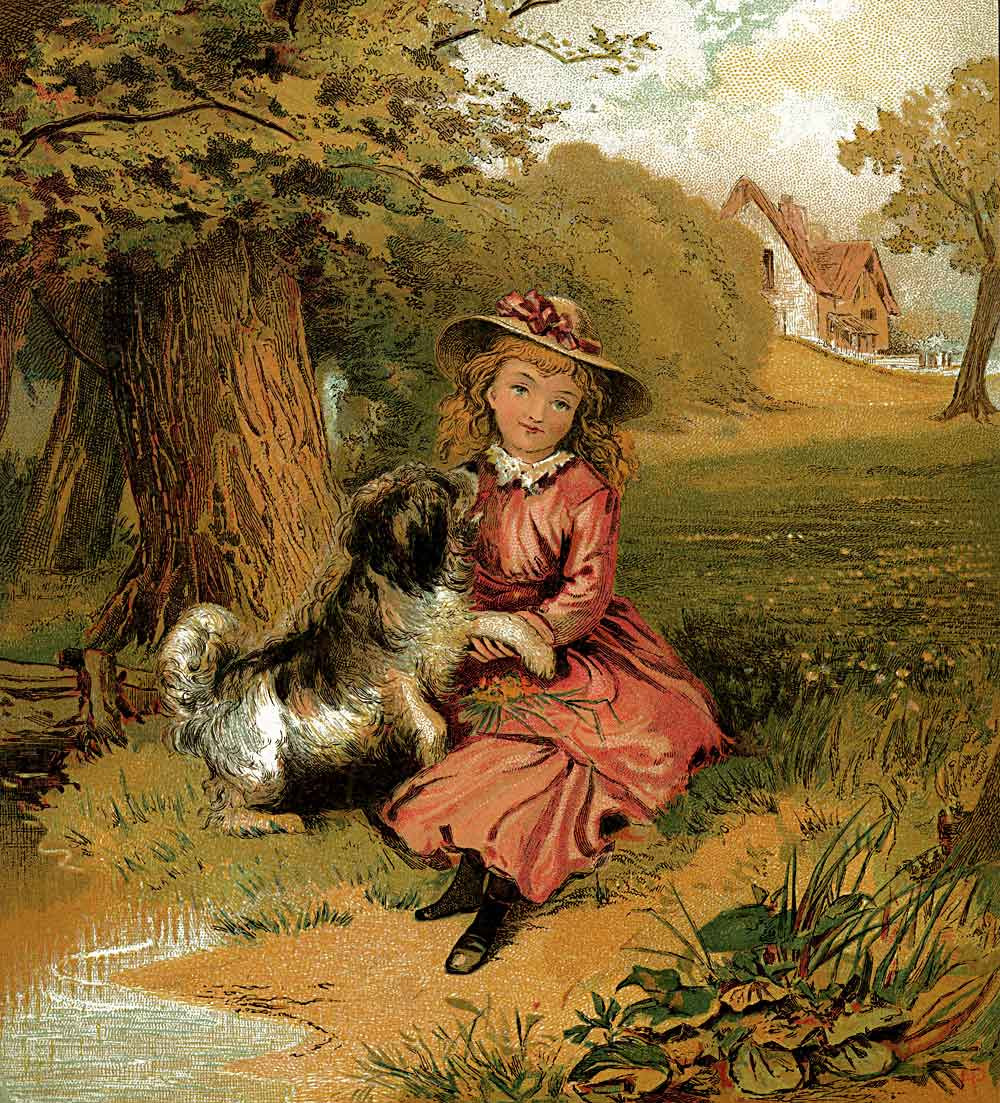
Nell and Tray sit under a tree and relax.

Work by Petherick can be found in the digital collections at:

- The British Library, one item digitally (plus nine other unique items on paper)
- Project Gutenberg, eight items
- Osborne Collection of Early Children's Books, two items (plus 11 other unique items on paper)
- Baldwin Library of Historical Children's Literature, six items

== Work with violins ==
Petherick was a violinist. In 1908 he stated in evidence that he owned 12 violins made by del Gesù. What is certain is that owned at least two first quality violins:

- At some stage after 1885 Petherick owned a violin widely acknowledged to be by del Gesù, the Bartolomeo Giuseppe Guarneri 'del Gesù', Cremona, 1735, the 'Kubelik, Rabin'. (Cozio archive number 40419).
- From 1900 to 1910 Petherick owned a Stradivarius violin the Antonio Stradivari, Cremona, 1683, the 'Petherick, Hart' (Cozio archive number 41258).

It is not clear when Petherick moved from being an illustrator to being a violin expert. In the title page of his 1900 book on Antonio Stradivari he lists that he was:

- Of the Music Jury, International Inventions Exhibition, South Kensington, 1885
- International Exhibition, Edinburgh, 1890
- Expert in Law Courts, 1891
- Vice-president of the Cremona Society

He was already contributing to Strad on the topics of stringed instruments and even wrote several serial books for Strad that they later published as part of the Strad Library. In 1882 he even had a series of five articles in the Boy's Own Paper on "How to Make a Violin". These were published on 21 October, 28 October, 4 November, 11 November, and with the last part on 18 November 1882.

His books for the Strad Library were published by The Strad in the UK and by Charles Scribner's Sons in the us. The titles included:

- The Strad Library No. VIII: Antonio Stradivari (1900). A second edition of this book was published in 1913.
- The Strad Library No. XII: The Repairing & Restoration of Violins (1903)
- The Strad Library XVII: Joseph Guarnerius, his work and his master (1906)
- A number of sources refer to a fourth book: The history of the Violin. This book was announced in a range of publications by Henry and Co. in 1893, but it is not certain that it was published as there seems to be no record of it in the catalogue of the British Library. A book that is in the British Library is With Wilson in Matabeleland... and annexed to this is a catalogue including the book The Violin: A Treatise, Historical and Critical, upon the work of the Principle Maker from the Introduction of the Violin to the Present Time. This book, essentially a history of the violin, was said to be In Press, but again, this does not seem to be in the British Library catalogue.

The first three of these books are still in print, as are some of the children's books that he illustrated.

Petherick was a member of the Cremona Society, and vice-president in 1900 when he wrote the book on Antonio Stravari. By the time that Petherick published his book on Guarnerius in 1906, he was now the president of the Cremona Society, as the title page declares.

== Status as a violin expert ==
=== Certifying the origins of violins ===
Not a lot is known about Petherick's work as an expert witness. The title pages of his books state that he was an Expert in the Law Courts from 1891. He frequently provided certificates of authenticity for violins, and appeared to give expert evidence on the origin of stringed instruments. Such certificates helped to reassure buyers that they were not being cheated. Petherick provided certificates for several violins including:

- Violin, by Joseph Guarnerius IHS c. 1740, original scroll, powerful tone, with certificates of Mr. Horace Petherick and Messrs Balfour and Co., Glendining, March 1st £150 on 1 March 1905. Balfour and Co., were instrument dealers Vincent F. Cooper and his brother A. Daily Cooper. Vincent F. Cooper was the Honorary Secretary of the Cremona Society while Petherick was vice-president or president (he was both at different times). Glendinings were an auction house that had previously specialised in coins.
- Very fine violin by Gregorio Montaldi of Cremona, a pupil of Antonius Stradivarius, with Mr. Horace Petherick's Certificate, £48 on 21 June 1905.
- Fine violin by Francesco Stradivarius of Cremona with certificates of Mr. Horace Petherick and Messrs Balfour and Co., also the opinion of Messrs W. E. Hill and Sons on this violin. £150 on 21 June 1905. W. E. Hill & Sons were specialists in violins and stringed instruments and are still in business today.
- A very fine violin by Francesco Stradivarisu of Cremona, made during the period 1710-1720 with the certificates of Mr. Horace Petherick and Messrs Balfour and Co, £156 on 26 July 1905.

=== The disputed del Gesù cello ===
Bartholomeo Giuseppe Guarneri was a luthier from the Guarneri Family of Cremona. He was known not only by a mix on anglicised and Latin forms of his name but also by the soubriquet of del Gesù (of Jesus) because he began to add a religious symbol after his name 1739. On 4 May 1906, the member of the Cremona Society were told that there would be a special meeting on 30 May, at which a paper dealing with the discovery of the only known cello by del Gesù would be read by Petherick and that the renowned cellist and teacher Herbert Walenn would play the instrument.

Petherick read his paper, the Cello was exhibited, and played. The August edition of The Strad reproduced a photograph of the front and back of the cello, and printed a series of documents dated 28 April 1906:

- a report from Vincent J. Cooper on the cello (but without giving any information on how it had come into his hands);
- a memo from Horace Petherick stating that this is the only known violoncello by del Gesù;
- and a certificate by Petherick that in his opinion, the cello was the work of del Gesù. The certificate stated: This is to certify that having carefully examined the violoncello submitted for my inspection this day, and to which the undermentioned particulars apply, I am of the opinion that it was made in Cremona by Joseph Guarnerius. lmpwm as "Del Gesu", that it is an early specimen, the date c. 1710, before he had entirely thrown aside the influence of his teacher Andreas Gisalberti. and went on to give a description of the instrument. Petherick's position as an expert was established by his having a book about del Gesù in press at the time.

In his book, Petherick claimed that Andrea Gisalberti of Parma was del Gesù's master, and the certificate referred to this. In their 1916 book, Hidalgo and Piper said that Andrea was a little-known maker of no great account and that neither Mr Petherick's arguments, nor the examples by which he strove to support them were seriously accepted by most judges of the first rank.

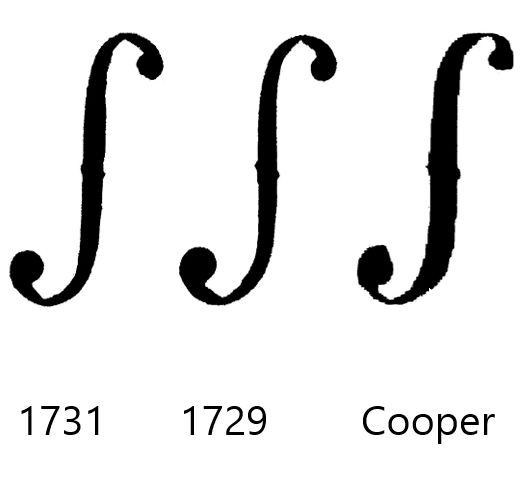
The f-holes of the two cellos believed to have been finished by del Gesù alongside the f-hole of the cello produced by Cooper and certified by Petherick

However, before The Strad could report on the meeting, Truth, a weekly known for exposing frauds of all kinds, ran a series of columns on the cello and on the Cremona Society:

- On 6 June 1906, Truth ridiculed the idea that the cello was by del Gesù, especially given that the Cooper brothers were so strangely reticent as to the antecedents of the instrument. It was two years later before Vincent Cooper told a court that he had bouth the cellos for £2 or £3 in a pawnbroker's sale. Truth also suggested the Petherick's certification would not carry much conviction given the absence of information about the provenance of the cello. Truth then goes on to note that there are those who allege that the Society is not made up of disinterested connoisseurs and amateurs but was a clever trade organisation masquerading as an artistic association. The day after this article the cello was sold by Glendennings for £350.
- On 13 June 1906, Truth carried a long column about the Cremona Society, and the extent to which dealers were represented on the committee. While not mentioning Petherick by name, Truth said of the cello which no real authority believes to be genuine gained a lot more attention through presentation at the Society than it would have gained had it initially been presented at auction in the normal way.

In The Strad's September 1906 edition there was a note from the editor of that: "At a recent committee meeting of the Cremona Society it was decided that on one connected with the trade should be a member of the committee or an officer of the society."

The Australian Chamber Orchestra states that to this day there are only two cellos known to have been completed by del Gesù. Only two cellos are listed in the Cosio Archive of musical instruments at Tarisio.com as having been, at least in part, the work of del Gesù. In both cases he is thought to have finished cellos that had been begun by his father. These are:

- Giuseppe Guarneri 'filius Andreae', Cremona, 1729, Cozio 43989, donated to the Australian Chamber Orchestra in 2007, and now played by Julian Thompson.
- Bartolomeo Giuseppe Guarneri 'del Gesù', Cremona, 1731, the 'Messeas' , Cozio 40383, Sold anonymously in 2013.

The provenance of neither of these, as presented in the Cozio archive, allows for discovery in London in 1906. The photographs published at the time show that the cello introduced by Cooper had significantly narrower and rounder wings (the tangs that form the inside of the scrolls at the top and bottom of the f-holes) than can be seen in photographs of the two cellos listed in the Cozio archive.

=== Three court cases ===
In the first of these cases, in 1907, the dealer Joseph Chanot relied on Petherick's certification of two violincellos to defend himself from an action by the purchaser. However, the court instead accepted the view of the expert from W.E. Hill & Sons and found against Chanot. The Hills were the recognised authorities on violins in the UK. Moya and Piper called the 1902 (with a 2nd edition in 1909), book by the Hills brothers on Antonio Stradivari "the most exhaustive critical survey of the subject which has yet appeared". Their volume on the Guarneri family, in which, among other things, they described their discovery of del Gesù's baptismal records, establishing his birth 21 August 1698, rather than the established fact that he was born in 1683 according to Petherick, or the date of October 1687 given by Moya and Piper.

In the second case, in April 1908, Dr. Hitchcock had bought a violin, certified by Petherick to be the work of Petrus Guarnerius, for £100. However, he found that the violin was not as represented and took the seller to court to recover his money. Alfred Hill of W. E. Hill & Sons gave evidence that the violin was in fact French. Petherick still maintained that it was by Guarnerius, but made no serious effort to rebut Hills testimony. The Defence argues that they gave no guarantee, but the jury found against them and awarded damage to Dr Hitchcock. Truth noted that Vincent J. Cooper bought the violin for £2 10s initially and sold it to the defendants for £25, who in turn sold it on to Hitchcock for £100. "presumably to add fictitious importance to an otherwise worthless document".

In the third case, in June 1908, Mr. English sued Vincent F. Cooper for fraud, alleging that he had sold English a violin claiming that it was by del Gesù. Cooper had certified the origin of the violin himself, even giving it the supposedly tradition nickname of giant. Petherick appeared in court to support the contention that it was by del Gesù and J. W. Hills & Sons maintained that it was not. However, the jury found against Cooper and awarded damages to English.

Chevalet's assessment was that this last trial should dispose once and for all of Mr Cooper's firm and of "the self-styled expert" Peterick. No further references to certificates by Petherick appear in The Strad. A slim volume dated 1910, announcing the retirement of Balfour and Co. as "Antique Italian Violin Transfer Agents and Experts" was offered for sale by Cambridge Books of Maine in February 2020.

== Death ==
Petherick's wife died in March 1909 and ten years later Petherick himself, at 80 years of age, died at his home in Addiscombe. He left an estate valued at £1,940, with probate granted to his daughter Rosa. The five daughters who had survived infancy all survived their father, but by only another five years in Ada's case.
