= Museum of Croydon =

Local museum in Croydon, England

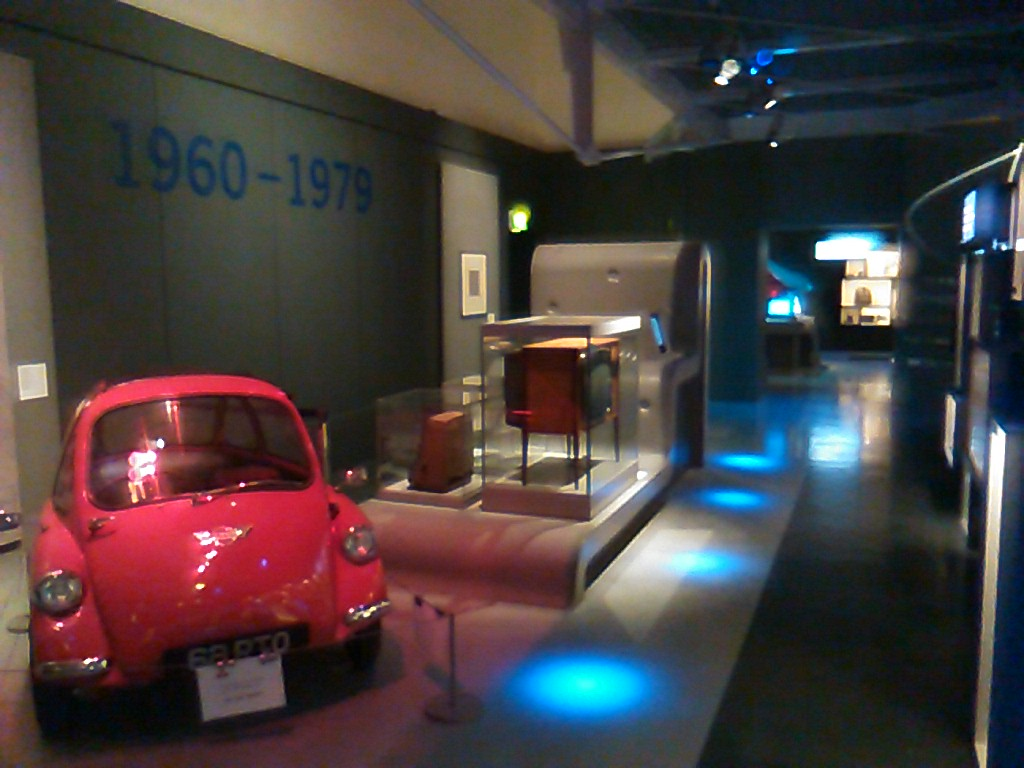

- Location within Greater London
- Established: 1995 (as Lifetimes); 2006 (as Museum of Croydon)
- Location: Croydon, London
- Coordinates: 51.3721°N 0.099°W
- Type: Local and social history museum
- Public transit access: East Croydon
- Website: http://www.museumofcroydon.com

The Museum of Croydon is a museum located within the Croydon Clocktower arts facility in Central Croydon, England. It showcases historical and cultural artefacts relating to the London Borough of Croydon and its people. The museum is owned and run by Croydon Council.

It is located on the upper ground floor of Croydon Clocktower, but also incorporates the Riesco Gallery, on the lower ground floor, which displays Roman and Anglo-Saxon collections and a collection of Chinese ceramics. The museum originally opened under the name Lifetimes in 1995; and re-opened under its present name, following a major redevelopment and redesign, in 2006. Admission is free, and many of the displays are hands-on and interactive.

== History ==
=== Background ===
Prior to the end of the 20th century, the County Borough and its successor the London Borough of Croydon did not run a local museum, despite many decades of lobbying by, among others, the Croydon Natural History & Scientific Society. However, the two councils had acquired an art collection of over 2,000 items, and also the Riesco Collection of Chinese pottery and porcelain, assembled by local collector Raymond Riesco and bequeathed to the County Borough in 1964. In 1987, conscious that the borough had an "identity problem" – it was perceived as "boring, bland and mediocre" – the Council committed £30 million towards a new arts, library and cultural complex, subsequently named Croydon Clocktower, which was to include a new local museum.

=== Lifetimes ===
Plans for the museum were developed over five years, from 1989 to 1994. The development process included an extensive programme of market research, undertaken in order to ascertain what the public wanted from a museum, and to make it accessible and relevant to the wider community. A particular effort was made to involve non-traditional museum users: participants in 8 out of 10 focus groups were selected on the basis of their ethnic diversity, their lack of educational qualifications, and their agreement with the statement that "I wouldn't be seen dead in a museum or arts centre". The research found that the words "Croydon", "museum" and "history" were all "turn-offs", and so the new institution was given the neutral name of "Lifetimes". Sally MacDonald, the principal museum officer, later explained:

Croydon's museum had to be new, different, modern, daring, high profile, glossy, sponsorable and popular. It would be a symbol to help market Croydon to a hostile outside world.

Lifetimes opened in March 1995. It set out to tell the story of Croydon and its people from 1840 to the present (and into the future), with the main emphasis being on the period from 1939 onwards. Exhibits were mainly borrowed from local residents; much information was drawn from oral history interviews; and there were no glass cases or labels (interpretation and explanation being supplied entirely through multimedia computer terminals). In a token acknowledgement of the borough's earlier history, an entrance sculpture was commissioned tracing Croydon's story back to the Big Bang.

Lifetimes won an Interpret Britain Award in 1995; and the National Heritage Multimedia Award in 1996. Gaynor Kavanagh, lecturer in Museum Studies at the University of Leicester, hailed it as:

a brave, bold and intelligent approach to exploring the contradictions and continuities which lie behind the complex histories of modern-day Croydon. ... After decades of striving for exhibitions that work against the grain of a male, white, middle class view of history, it is both refreshing and empowering to find an exhibition which is confident, uninhibited yet sensitive in its handling of the plurality of life.

However, it was also criticised for being "politically correct" (for example, in over-emphasising the presence of ethnic minorities in Croydon, even in historical periods at which their presence was highly exceptional); for its excessive populism; and for its over-reliance on new technology. "In the absence of labelling," wrote Maurice Davies in the Museums Journal, "screens are a cumbersome way to present basic information." The late start date of 1840, which left much of the borough's story unaddressed, particularly irked local historians. Caroline Reinhardt in The Spectator wrote:

There is nothing in the displays about Croydon's putative origins as a Roman staging post; nothing about its thousand-odd years of growth as a manor and palace of the Archbishops of Canterbury; nothing about its early industrial history. There was no room for any of the remarkable swords, shield-bosses, brooches and other items excavated from the early Saxon cemetery. Room has been found instead for a Hell's Angel's jacket, a plastic condom demonstrator, and an Ann Summers posing pouch. A drug addict's syringes jostle for space with the blanket and bag of a homeless man named Kash.

The museum published three leaflets relating to ethnic minority groups in Croydon, titled Black Lifetimes, South Asian Lifetimes and Irish Lifetimes. The last of these was withdrawn after it drew complaints from David Trimble, leader of the Ulster Unionist Party, of pro-republican bias.

=== Museum of Croydon ===
Lifetimes closed for a major refurbishment and redesign in December 2004. It re-opened, now rebranded as the Museum of Croydon, in September 2006. The re-styled galleries won the FX International Interior Design Award for Best Museum & Gallery in 2007. Many of the exhibits and themes included in Lifetimes were retained in the new displays; but, among other changes, the start date for the historical story was pushed back to 1800, and the Riesco Gallery was redesigned so that it could also display, in addition to the ceramics, items from Croydon's Roman and Anglo-Saxon collections.

== Displays ==
The museum has a range of exhibits reflecting different aspects of the history of Croydon and the surrounding areas, from 1800 to the present. The visitor to the main galleries has a choice of entering through one of two doors, "Then" or "Now", and so can follow the story in either chronological or reverse chronological order. The museum also incorporates (on the lower ground floor) the Riesco Gallery, which features Roman and Anglo-Saxon collections and the Riesco Collection of Chinese ceramics.

The museum includes exhibits about the important black composer Samuel Coleridge-Taylor (1875–1912) who lived most of his life in Croydon; items that the local IKEA in Purley Way sold when it first opened, such as furniture and catalogues; and artefacts from the local football club, Crystal Palace, such as Peter Taylor's contract.

== Art collection ==
The museum's art collection comprises over 2,000 works, including paintings, prints, drawings and sketches. Only a small proportion are on permanent display. Artists represented include a number with strong local connections, such as Cicely Mary Barker, Rosa Petherick, Horace William Petherick, Juliet Pannett, Bridget Riley, and Malcolm McLaren; as well as others, such as Valentine Prinsep and Rabindranath Tagore, whose work has entered the collections through more indirect routes. Over three hundred of the works in the collection can be seen online at the Art UK website.

== Accreditation ==
In December 2009, the museum was awarded official recognition by the Museums, Libraries and Archives Council, showing that the management of its collections, and facilities provided for visitors, had met national standards. In November 2013, it was stripped of its accreditation (now under the auspices of Arts Council England), and excluded from reapplying for five years, following its decision to put 24 items from the Riesco Collection up for sale at auction in what was described as a "deliberate contravention" of the Museums Association's code of ethics. Under threat of disciplinary action, Croydon Council resigned its membership of the Museums Association at this time.

== Bibliography ==
- Davies, Maurice (July 1995). "Picasso to posing pouch". Museums Journal. 95 (7). Museums Association: 20.
- Fussell, Angela (1997). "Make 'em laugh, make 'em cry! Collecting for Lifetimes – the interactive museum about Croydon people". Nordisk Museologi. 1: 39–56.
- Kavanagh, Gaynor (August 1995). "Clocking on [letter]". Museums Journal. 95 (8). Museums Association: 16.
- MacDonald, Sally (1992). "Your place or mine? Or, are museums just for people like us?". Social History Curators Group Journal. 19: 21–7.
- MacDonald, Sally (1995). "Changing our minds: planning a responsive museum service". In Hooper-Greenhill, Eilean (ed.). Museum, Media, Message. London: Routledge. pp. 165–74. ISBN 0415116724.
- MacDonald, Sally (1998). "Croydon: what history?". In Kavanagh, Gaynor; Frostick, Elizabeth (eds.). Making City Histories in Museums. London: Leicester University Press. pp. 58–79. ISBN 071850030X.
- Reinhardt, Caroline (4 April 1998). "History with attitude". The Spectator: 43–4.
- Young, Georgina (2008). "Is Croydon crap? A case study on the representation of place in social history museums" (PDF). Social History in Museums. 32: 55–9.
