= Croydon Natural History & Scientific Society =

- Location within London Borough of Croydon Croydon Natural History & Scientific Society (Greater London) Croydon Natural History & Scientific Society (the United Kingdom)
- Abbreviation: CNHSS
- Formation: 1870
- Type: Cultural society
- Purpose: The study of the local history, archaeology, natural history and geology of the London Borough of Croydon and adjoining districts
- Location: Croydon, United Kingdom
- Coordinates: 51.35729056°N 0.09792789°W
- Region served: London Borough of Croydon and surrounding areas
- Website: cnhss.co.uk

The Croydon Natural History & Scientific Society (CNHSS) is a cultural society based in Croydon, south London, that concerns itself with the local history, archaeology, natural history and geology of the London Borough of Croydon and adjacent areas. It was founded in 1870; and is a registered charity (no 260739).

== History ==
The society was founded as the Croydon Microscopical Club in 1870. It changed its name in 1877 to the Croydon Microscopical and Natural History Club; and again in 1902 to the present Croydon Natural History & Scientific Society. It was incorporated as a company in 1967; and was registered as a charity in 1970.

== Activities ==
The society holds a regular programme of lecture meetings, field meetings and excursions. It maintains a library and a museum, and publishes a journal.

== Sections ==
Informal sections of the society include the Ornithology Group and the Entomology Section.

== Publications ==
Since its foundation, the society has published a regular journal, titled Proceedings, which normally appears annually and contains between one and three substantial articles on local history or other topics within the society's sphere of interest. Since 1967 it has also published a more frequent Bulletin, which is now issued three times a year: two of these issues contain a variety of shorter articles and news items, while the third contains formal papers submitted for the annual general meeting. It has published a number of illustrated local history books, and other miscellaneous publications.

== Premises and museum ==
The society's headquarters, registered office and library building, purchased in 1966, is at 96a, Brighton Road, South Croydon. The museum (which is open only on an occasional basis, or by appointment) is housed in separate premises at Chipstead Valley Primary School.

== Emblem ==
The society's emblem is a representation of a 5th- or 6th-century bronze openwork disc in a triskelion design, probably a girdle ornament or amulet, which was found in 1893 in an Anglo-Saxon cemetery in Edridge Road, Croydon. The original object can now be seen in the Riesco Gallery of the Museum of Croydon.
