= Raymond Riesco =

Raymond Francis Alfred Riesco (15 July 1877 – 9 March 1964) was a British insurance broker at LLOYDS and director of Price Forbes who is remembered both as a philatelist (he was added to the Roll of Distinguished Philatelists in 1951); and as a collector of Chinese ceramics.

== Collections ==
As a philatelist, Riesco was a specialist in the stamps of the Cape of Good Hope. He joined the Royal Philatelic Society London in 1922, later becoming a vice-president. He formed important collections of Chile and Mexico, but later specialised in the Cape of Good Hope, his collection of which was shown at most of the important exhibitions between the world wars.

He also collected Chinese pottery and porcelain, and was a founder member of the Oriental Ceramic Society in 1921. He bequeathed his collection to the County Borough of Croydon, and it is now held by the Museum of Croydon where it is displayed in the Riesco Gallery. In 2013, the museum put 24 items from the collection up for sale at auction, an action that led to its being stripped of its accreditation with Arts Council England.

== Death ==
Riesco died at his home, Heathfield, Addington, Croydon, on 9 March 1964.
