= George Lillie Craik =

Scottish writer and literary critic

George Lillie Craik (1798–1866) was a Scottish writer and literary critic.

== Life ==
Born at Kennoway, Fife, he was the eldest of three illustrious brothers to the local schoolmaster, his younger brothers including Henry Craik and James Craik.

He was educated at the University of St. Andrews, and went to London in 1824, where he wrote largely for the Society for the Diffusion of Useful Knowledge.

In 1849 he was appointed Professor of English Literature and History at Belfast. Among his books are The New Zealanders (1830), The Pursuit of Knowledge under Difficulties (1831), History of British Commerce (1844), and History of English Literature and the English Language (1861). He was also joint author of The Pictorial History of England, and wrote books on Edmund Spenser and Francis Bacon.

His Sketches of Popular Tumults: Illustrative of the Evils of Social Ignorance (1837) included an account of the Gordon Riots in which he wrote that many rioters "drank themselves literally dead, and many more, who had rendered themselves unable to move, perished in the midst of flames", and may have influenced Charles Dickens' depiction of the riots in Barnaby Rudge (1841). Herman Melville drew inspiration for Queequeg in his novel Moby-Dick from a description in Craik's book, The New Zealanders (1830), of Te Pēhi Kupe, a Māori chief of the Ngāti Toa iwi famous for his travels in England.

== Family ==
His second daughter was the novelist Georgiana M. Craik.
