= James Craik (moderator) =

Scottish minister

James Craik (1801–1870) was a Scottish minister who served as Moderator of the General Assembly of the Church of Scotland in 1863/4.

== Life ==
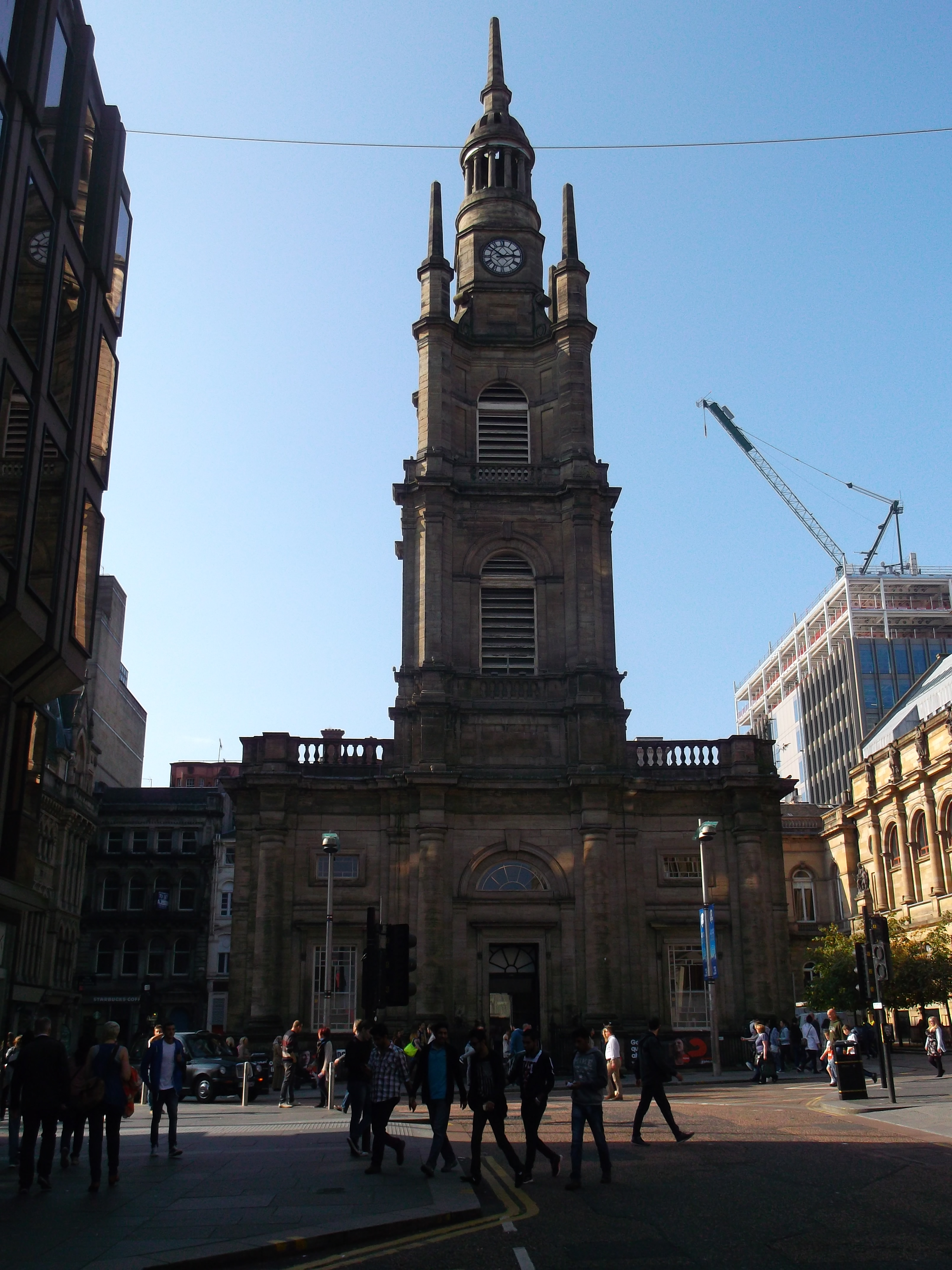
St George's Tron Church in Glasgow

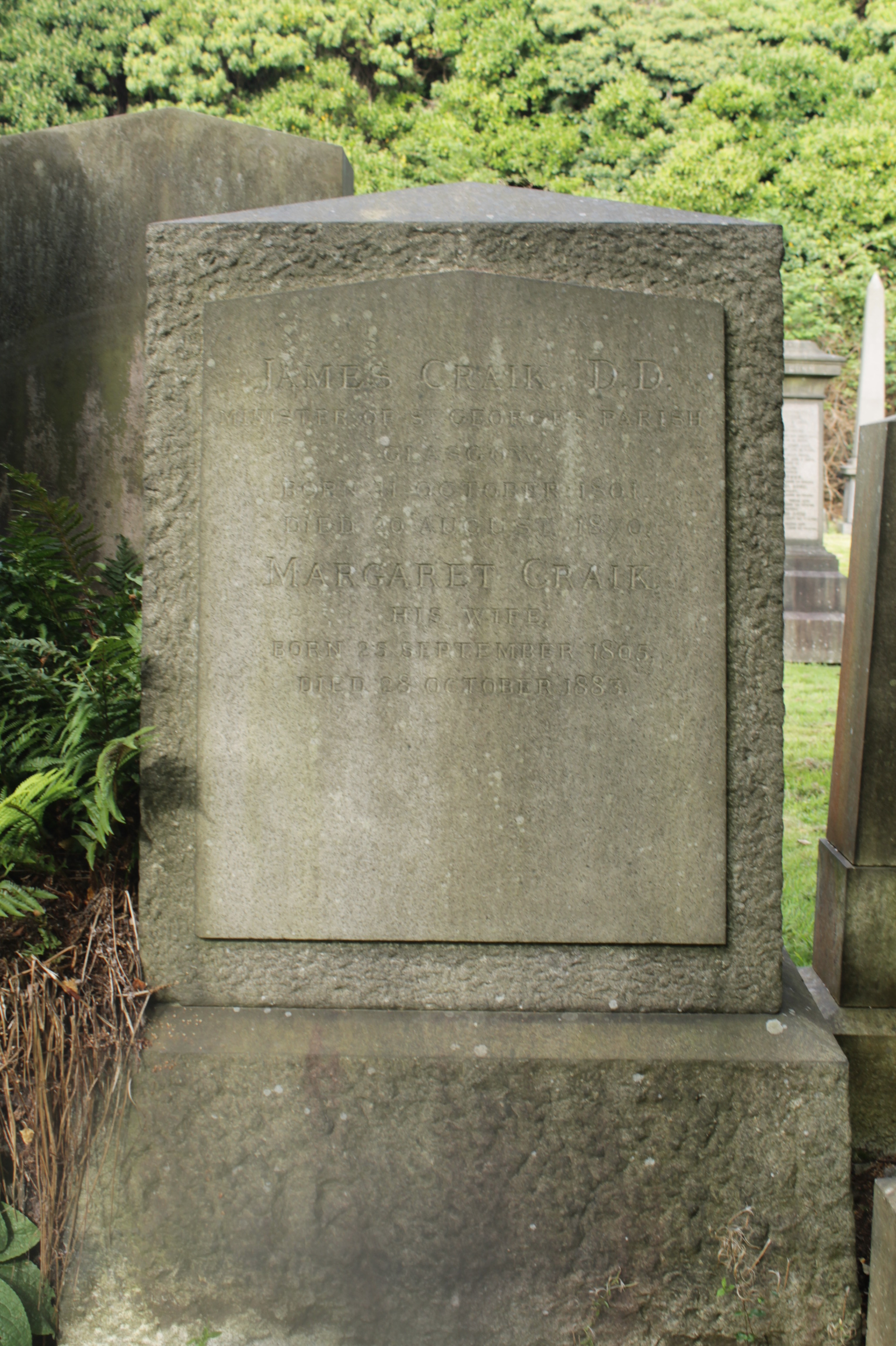
The grave of Rev James Craik, Glasgow Necropolis

He was born on 11 October 1801 in Kennoway in Fife to the local teacher (the school being church-run), Willam Craik and his wife, Paterson Lillie (sic). He was the second of three illustrious brothers: his elder brother was George Lillie Craik; his younger brother was Henry Craik.

He was educated by his father then he (and his brothers) went to St Andrews University. James studied divinity. After graduation he taught Classics at George Heriot's School in Edinburgh then was licensed to preach by the Church of Scotland in 1832, his first charge being Scone in Perthshire.

In 1842 he moved to St George's (Tron) Church in Glasgow. He lived at 15 Sandyford Place, a charming Georgian terraced house in the city centre, just south of Sauchiehall Street. He remained minister of St Georges until death, but also (due to his father) took great interest in the development of the Church of Scotland Normal School (which played a vital role in Scottish education until the 1870s).

He succeeded Very Rev James Bisset as Moderator in 1863 and in turn was succeeded by Rev William Robinson Pirie in 1864.

He died at home at Sandyford Place on 20 August 1870. He is buried in the Glasgow Necropolis. The grave lies on the north side of the sloping path connecting the south-east corner of the upper plateau to the low-lying south section.

== Family ==
On 8 November 1832 he was married to Margaret Grieve (1805–1883). She is buried with him.≤

Their children included Jane Paterson Craik, Margaret Craik, George Lillie Craik II, William Craik, Isabella Marion Craik, James Craik and Henry Craik (1846–1927).
