= Georgiana Marion Craik =

English writer (1831–1895)

- Born: April 1831; London, England
- Died: 1 November 1895 (aged 64); St Leonards-on-Sea, England
- Occupation: Writer
- Spouse: Allan Walter May (m. 1886)
- Parent(s): George Lillie Craik; Jeanette Dempster

Georgiana Marion Craik (April 1831 – 1 November 1895) was an English writer.

The daughter of George Lillie Craik and Jeanette Dempster, she was born in Old Brompton, London. She began writing for Household Words, possibly as early as 1851. Her first novel Riverston was published in 1857. Her novels were targeted at young women; she also wrote some books for young readers.

In 1886, she married Allan Walter May, an artist.

During 1879-1882, while Craik was living in West London with her sister Mary and their friend Hannah Winnard, their household served as a second home for Rudyard Kipling while he attended the United Services College. He fondly recollected the house as "filled with books, peace, kindliness, patience" and Craik herself as "[writing] novels on her knee, by the fireside, sitting just outside the edge of conversation, beneath two clay pipes tied with black ribbon, which once Carlyle had smoked".

Craik died in St Leonards-on-Sea at the age of 64.

== Works ==
- Riverston: A Novel (1857)
- Lost and Won (1859)
- My First Journal: A Book for the Young (1860)
- Winifred's Wooing: A Novelette (1862)
- Faith Unwin's Ordeal (1865)
- Leslie Tyrrell (1867)
- Mildred (1868)
- Cousin Trix and her Welcome Tales (1868)
- Esther Hill's Secret (1870)
- Hero Trevelyan: A Tale (1871)
- The Cousin from India: A Story for Girls (1871)
- Without Kith or Kin (1872)
- Only a Butterfly (1873)
- Miss Moore: A Tale for Girls (1873)
- Sylvia's Choice (1874)
- Theresa (1875)
- Two Tales of Married Life (1877)
- Anne Warwick (1877)
- Dorcas (1879)
- Two Women (1880)
- Hilary's Love Story (1880)
- Sydney (1881)
- Mark Dennison's Charge (1881)
- Fortune's Marriage (1882)
- Godfrey Helstone: A Novel (1884)
- Mrs. Hollyer (1885)
- A Daughter of the People: A Novel (1886)
- Diana (1889)
- Patience Holt (1891)
- The House of Sweet Memories (1892)
