= Osborne Collection of Early Children's Books =

The Osborne Collection of Early Children's Books is a collection of children's books with over 80,000 items held at the Toronto Public Library, Canada.

== History of the collection ==
The collection owes its genesis to one man, Edgar Osborne, the Country Librarian for Derbyshire, UK, from 1923 – 1954. As a child, Osborne had gained a love of books from his maternal grandmother. She had been a Dame School teacher and had a collection of nursery books. This small collection became the nucleus of the whole collection.

After his marriage to his first wife Mabel in 1918, Osborne and Mabel began to collect the books that they had read and enjoyed as children. That is why the cut-off date for the Osborne collection is 1910, when Osborne would have been about to turn 21. With the years, the collection moved further back in time, to include a 1566 copy of Aesop's Fables. By 1946, when Mabel died, their collection had grown to c. 1,800 volumes.

There is another justification for the cut-off date. In the Introduction to Volume One of the Catalogue published in 1975, Osborne wrote: "As time passed and our Collection grew, we came to understand that the term "children's classic" could not be so defined to suit the range of our interests. We needed a wider definition that would include many of the books we liked as children, but which in no way imaginable could be termed children's classics...the decision, right or wrong, was that a book that had been read and re-read by successive generations of children came within range of our library....only time, combined with the involuntary and often unconscious co-operation of children, will decide which [contemporary books] will find entrance into the realms of the elect."

After Mabel died in 1946, Osborne began looking for a permanent home for it. Osborne offered it to libraries in England, but none would meet his conditions that it should be properly housed and described in a published catalogue. Fortunately, he remembered the visit he and Mabel had made to Toronto in 1934. Osborne had been a delegate for the Library Association of Great Britain at a meeting of American Library Association and travelled on to Canada with Mabel afterwards. They were impressed by what they saw in the Toronto Public Library, and especially by the work of Lillian H. Smith, the head of the children's library services.

When no British library was interested, Osborne immediately thought of Toronto. He wrote in 1946 to the head librarian in Toronto to offer the books as a tribute to Lillian Smith and to Mabel. The library accepted and the mechanics of arranging the move of the collection began. Osborne continued to search for additional items throughout his life, and donate items to the collection. The collection had grown to nearly 12,000 items by his death in 1978, and the collection now contains over 80,000 items.

Volume One of the catalogue of the collection was first published in 1958, and was reprinted in 1975 when Volume Two was published. Grenby and Reynolds note the while the availability of online catalogues has transformed research, printed catalogues can still be useful. They call the Osborne Collection catalogue a fine example of such a catalogue, and notes that it is often regarded as a standard work of reference in the field. The collection is widely cited. The HathiTrust catalogue lists 1,349 items citing the Collection. The Internet Archive lists over 250 full text items citing the collection.

== Composition of the collection ==
The collection has grown not only in quantity, but also in the period which is spans. When Osborne donated his collection, the oldest item was from 1566, about 400 years old. Now the oldest item in the collection is a cuneiform tablet that is c. 4000 years old.

The original Osborne Collection (with items up to the cut-off date of 1910) still forms the largest portion of the whole collection. It ranges from literary classics to popular culture, including children's novelties like moveables and miniatures. It also includes an extensive collection of works by G. A. Henty, with nearly 1,800 items in the collection written by him. It also contains the Pettingell Collection of periodicals and penny dreadfuls, and the childhood libraries of such notables as Florence Nightingale and Queen Mary.

The collection now includes another three other sub-collections:

- The Lillian H. Smith Collection in 1962. Smith was the first professionally trained Children's librarian in the then British Empire and had set up the library services for children which had so impressed Osborne on his 1934 visit. This collection comprises creative books of literary and artistic merit, published in English since 1911, as such items could not be included in the main collection because of its cut-off date. This collection was set up on the 50th anniversary of the first Children's library that Smith had established in Toronto in 1912.
- The Canadiana collection contains children's book related to Canada, or whose publisher or illustrators were related to Canada. Highlights of this collection in include: the manuscript of An illustrated Comic Alphabet (1859), the first Canadian picture book; small press publications; and an archive of current Canadian authors.
- The Jean Thomson Collection of Original Art in 1977. This collection named after Jean Thomson, the former children's librarian and head of the Toronto Public Library. This include over one thousand pieces of original art. The art is from both Canadian illustrators such as Elizabeth Cleaver, Laszlo Gal, Marie-Louise Gay, Margaret Bloy Graham, James Houston, Barbara Reid, Maurice Sendak; and non-Canadian illustrators including: Edward Ardizzone, Randolph Caldecott, Walter Crane, Kate Greenaway, and Arthur Rackham.

The collection is supported by charitable donations. The Friends of the Osborne and Lillian H. Smith Collections was established in 1966 and welcomes members from all over the world. The British Branch of the Friends is the Children's Books History Society.
