= Kennoway =

Coordinates: 56°12′N 3°03′W

Kennoway: Scottish Gaelic: Ceann Achaidh
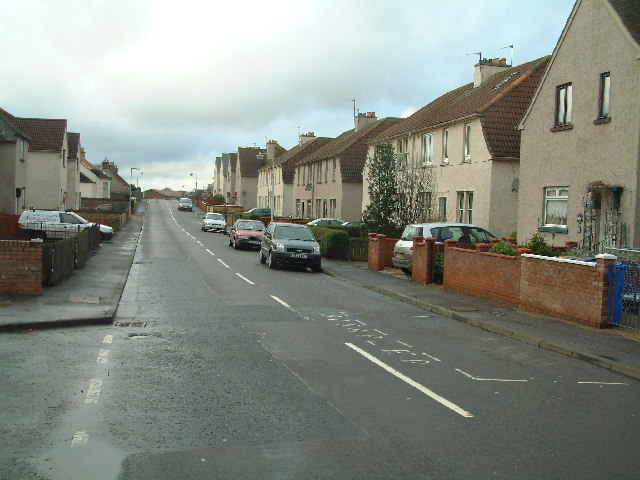
- Leven Road, Kennoway

- Location within Fife
- Population: 4,570 (2020)
- Council area: Fife
- Country: Scotland
- Sovereign state: United Kingdom
- Police: Scotland
- Fire: Scottish
- Ambulance: Scottish

Kennoway is a village in Fife, Scotland, near the larger population centres in the area of Leven and Methil. It had an estimated population of 4,570 in 2020. It is about three miles inland from the Firth of Forth, north of Leven. This position gave it importance in the old days while travelling by coach, for the stage road ran through Kennoway from the ferry at Pettycur, through Ceres, and on to St Andrews. The street known as "The Causeway" was also added to part of the Fife Pilgrim Way in 2019 due ties with St Kenneth, the Causeway being part of one of the designated conservation areas by Fife Council

== Place-name history ==
Kennoway derives from Scottish Gaelic, though the exact meaning is obscure. The name was first recorded as Kennachin in 1160. The first element 'kenn' is from the Gaelic ceann meaning 'head', 'top' or 'end'. The second and final elements, 'ach' and 'in' appear to both be suffixes indicating location. Taken together, the name appears to mean 'head- or end-place, place at the head or end'.

== Church history ==
On record by the third quarter of the twelfth century when it was granted to the priory at St Andrews by Merleswain son of Colban, the dedication to St Kenneth(1) suggests that the church of Kennoway might have considerably greater antiquity. Merleswain's charter, datable to 1172x1178, granted the church with all its associated teinds and oblations, together with various lands held at that time by Simeon the parish priest.(2) His grant was confirmed by Bishop Richard of St Andrews before 1178 and subsequently by Merleswain's son and successor, Merleswain.(3) Bishop Richard's successor, Hugh, confirmed the canons’ possession of the church in a general confirmation of 1178x1184, naming Richard as the donor, and in 1198/9 Hugh's successor Roger de Beaumont issued a further confirmation.(4) Papal confirmations were secured with regularity from the first mention in a bull of Pope Alexander III c.1174 down to Innocent IV in 1246.(5) Royal confirmation was obtained from King William between 1189 and 1195 in a general confirmation of the priory's lands and rights.(6)

All of these grants and confirmations down to the 1240s, despite regular repetition of the gifts of the church, kirklands, teinds and oblations, appear only to have involved the patronage of the church. Indeed, Pope Innocent IV's 1246 bull stated that it was the advowson of Kennoway that the priory held.(7) Before 1233, however, a charter of William Comyn, earl of Buchan, had confirmed all of the priory's rights in the church, just as Merleswain had granted it to St Andrews, the grant being confirmed by his wife, Countess Margery, in her own charter.(8) This re-grant appears to have been the catalyst which enabled the priory to secure greater control of Kennoway, Bishop David de Bernham in 1240 confirming it to them in proprios usus with suitable provision for a vicar.(9)

It was as a vicarage that the church is recorded in the accounts of the papal tax-collector in Scotland in 1275. It appears first as the vicarage of Kenmanthin (the church is usually named Kennachin in the St Andrews records), paying 10s in tax.(10) There are very few later medieval references to the church or its clergy, one vicar, John Lawson, being recorded in 1429–1430.(11) In 1512, on the erection of the College of St Leonard in St Andrews, the vicarage of Kennoway was annexed to the new collegiate foundation.(12) The attempt, however, was unsuccessful and at the Reformation while the parsonage remained annexed to the priory, valued at £160, the vicarage perpetual valued at £30 was in the hands of one John Row.(13)

== Notable people ==
- Allan Brown – former professional football player and manager
- The Craik brothers: George Lillie Craik – writer and literary critic; Henry Craik (evangelist); and James Craik (moderator)
- Henry McLeish – former First Minister of Scotland
- Shaun Byrne (footballer, born 1993) - professional footballer
