= Edgar Osborne =

English librarian (1890-1978)

- Born: 23 March 1890; Christchurch, near Bournemouth, England
- Died: 24 November 1978 (aged 88); Morley, Derbyshire, England
- Occupation: Librarian
- Years active: 1903–1966
- Known for: Assembling the Osborne Collection
- Notable work: Osborne Collection of Early Children's Books
- Spouses: Mabel Jacobsen (m. 1918; died 1946) Kerstin Munck af Rosenschold (m. 1957)

Edgar Osborne (23 March 1890 – 24 November 1978) was a distinguished librarian, an able administrator, scholar and collector, who founded one of the premier collections of children's fiction, the Osborne Collection of Early Children's Books.

== Early life ==
He was born in Christchurch near Bournemouth on the south coast of England. His father, Albert was a letter-carrier, and he had married Louise Jane Hall, originally from Kingston-on-Thames, on 7 February 1888. Edgar was the second of three children for the couple, with an older sister Lilian (1889) and a younger brother Herbert (1892). All three children are shown living at home with their parents in the 1901 census.

Edgar's maternal grandmother had been a teacher at a Dame school and had a collection of nursery books. She encouraged Edgar's love of books by sharing her collection with him. Osborne attended St. Paul's School in Bournemouth, completing his formal education at age 11. At that time Bournemouth had no secondary schools, and, "as education was difficult for poor boys", he spent six years studying at home, at the library, and in evening classes.

He married Mabel Jacobsen (1887–1946) at St Alban's Church in Bournemouth on 22 August 1918 while on a 14 day pass from his unit. Mabel was a Shakespearean actress, who has trained at the Leeds College of Dramatic Art, and was especially interested in the Little Theatre movement, and in verse speaking. Mabel died on 13 July 1946 at the Derbyshire Royal Infirmary, leaving £690 14s 7d to Osborne. The couple had no children.

Edgar married again in April 1957, to Kerstin Munck af Rosenschold, a Swedish librarian, who was until her retirement the City Librarian of Lund. He told a friend that he planned to spend the summers in Sweden and the winters in England. Kerstin shared his interests and visited the collection in Canada with him in 1953 and 1965.

== Work as a librarian ==
Osborne became the student librarian at the Bournemouth Library (then at Horseshoe Common) in 1903 (aged 13) and remained in that post for ten years, after which he went to work at Sheffield City Library. The First World War interrupted his library work and he joined the army on 6 December 1915. He served in France from June 1916 to November 1916. Then he spent more than seven months with the Sanonica Expeditionary Force in Greece. He then spent a year with the Expeditionary Force in Egypt, returning to France in June 1918.

He served throughout in the 2/14 Battalion of the London Regiment (the London Scottish). He was promoted to lance corporal in 1918 and was a Lewis gun instructor. He later said that his war experience was "like living in a George Alfred Henty book". His younger brother Herbert, was wounded in France and died of his wounds on 9 April 1918. Osborne himself had only minor hospital visits. He was demobilised on 5 April 1919 with a "Very Good" conduct rating. He then returned to Sheffield.

In 1923, he was appointed County Librarian of Derbyshire. When he started he had two assistants and a stock of only twelve thousand books. By the time he retired in 1954 the library service had one hundred and sixty-five staff and nearly a million books. Osborne oversaw forty two branches and eight mobile libraries. The Birmingham Daily Post said that "he has built up one of the finest rural library services in the country. Students from all over the world visit Derbyshire to study methods he introduced."

He retired in 1954, but did not stop work. He was appointed librarian to the Marquis of Salisbury to oversee the 30,000 volumes at Hatfield House. As part of his work for the Marquis, he visited the US on Hatfield House library business. While at Hatfield House he discovered a rare 1597 copy of the second edition Francis Bacon's Essays which was sold at Sotheby's for £2,600 in 1958.

He later became the private librarian to the FitzRoy Newdigate family at Arbury Hall. However, he still worked on the collection in Toronto, at time acquiring books for it, and at other times answering bibliographical queries from staff.

He was retained as an advisor by the Toronto Public Library in 1956 to assist with the work of cataloguing the collection (by then much larger than when he donated it), after the death of the librarian who had just finished cataloging half the collection. He worked at the library for five weeks to resolve outstanding questions. Osborne visited Toronto, with his second wife Kerstin, in May 1959 to for the publication of the Osborne Catalogue and again for a colloquium in 1965.

== Building the collection ==
Starting with the nursery collection that Osborne had read as a child, he and Mabel began collecting the books they had known and enjoyed as children. The collection continued to grow backwards in time with even a 1566 copy of Aesop's Fables.

By the time of Mabel's death in 1946 the collection held 1,800 books and Osborne was looking for a permanent home for it. Osborne offered it to libraries in England, but none would meet his conditions that it should be properly housed and described in a published catalogue.

Fortunately, Osborne and Mabel had visited Toronto in 1934 and met Judith St. John Osborne had been a delegate for the Library Association of Great Britain at a meeting of American Library Association and travelled on to Canada after the meeting. They were impressed by what they say there, and by the work of Lillian H. Smith, the head of the children's library services. When no British library was interested, Osborne offered the collection to Toronto and they accepted. He continued to search for additional items throughout his life, and donate items to the collection. The collection had grown to nearly 12,00 items by 1979, and held 80,000 items by 2013.

== Awards ==
Osborne, who had finished full-time education at eleven, received the following awards:

- An honorary Master of Arts degree in July 1958 from the University of Nottingham.
- An honorary Doctor of Laws degree from the University of Toronto in June 1970 "to celebrate the prescience of the pioneer, the discoveries of the timeless researcher, the wisdom of a generous donor".

== Death ==
He died at his home in Morley, near Derby. While the Token for Friends says that he died at his home in Smalley, this had been his address until the death of his wife. Later reports, and his probate records give his address in Morley. He left an estate of £112,859.
