= Henry Craik (evangelist) =

Scottish hebraist, theologian and preacher

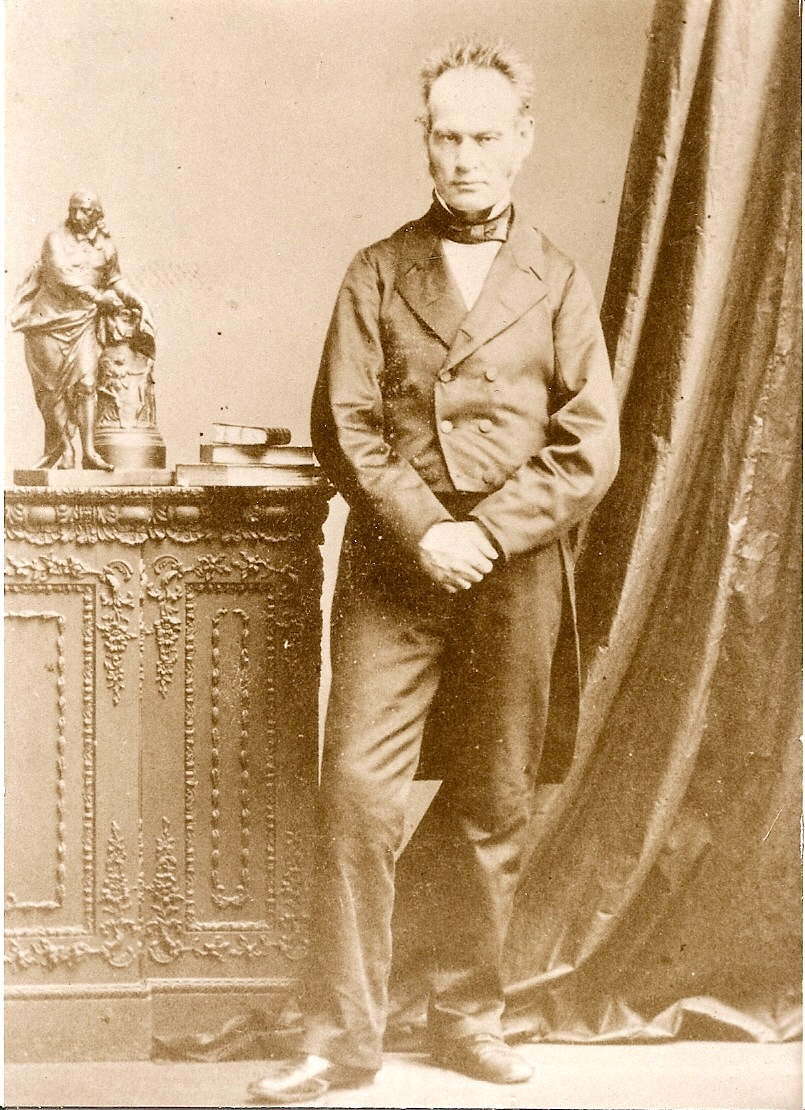
- Born: 8 August 1805; Prestonpans, Scotland
- Died: 22 January 1866 (aged 60); Bristol, England
- Education: University of St Andrews, Scotland
- Occupations: hebraist, theologian, preacher
- Spouse(s): Mary Anderson (d 1 February 1832), Sarah Howland
- Children: Henry William (b 18 Jan 34), George (b 20 Dec 49)
- Parent(s): The Reverend William Craik (d 1830), Miss Paterson Lillie (d 21 Oct 1848)

Henry Craik (8 August 1805 – 22 January 1866) was a Scottish hebraist, theologian and preacher.

== Life ==
Craik grew up in Kennoway, where his father was the schoolmaster of a church-run school. He had two notable older brothers: George Lillie Craik and James Craik (who served as Moderator of the General Assembly 1863/64). From 1820 he joined his brothers at the University of St Andrews and did well at literature, language, philosophy, and religious studies. By his own admission, he was “a religious man without God” but drifted back to Christianity in 1826 at the age of 21.

In July 1826 he was invited to become the family tutor for Anthony Norris Groves in Exeter where he spent the next two years. He left their employ to return to Edinburgh on 3 May 1828, but a few weeks later he returned to Exeter, to become the tutor to the two sons of John Synge, formerly of Glanmore Castle in Ireland but then living at Buckridge House, near Teignmouth. During his three-year tenure with Synge, Craik made a detailed examination of the original languages of the Bible, publishing a book “Easy introduction to the Hebrew Language” (London: Sealey and Burnside) in 1831, which was funded by Synge.

In 1829 he made the acquaintance of George Müller, a Prussian who had come to Teignmouth to convalesce from an illness. The two became lifelong friends. Müller moved down from London in January 1830 to become pastor of the Baptist church in Teignmouth, while Craik took a similar post in Shaldon in April 1831.

On 30 March 1832, Craik accepted an invitation from Mr A Chapman to take over the pastorate of Gideon Chapel in Newfoundland Street, Bristol. Shortly afterwards he wrote to George Müller asking him to join him in this work, and Müller moved to Bristol in the second half of April 1832. As well as the Gideon Chapel, they also led the Bethesda Chapel (neither building remains, having been destroyed during the Second World War), and led many to faith in Jesus Christ.

== Family ==
In 1831 Craik married Mary Anderson. She died on 1 February 1832 from consumption, and he remarried on 30 October 1832, to Sarah Howland. It is not clear how many children they had. After his first son, Henry William (born on 18 January 1834), an unnamed daughter is recorded in his diary as being born in 1836 and dying on 18 February 1837. Another son, George, was born on 29 August 1840 but he died on 28 June 1841. Mary Eliza was born on 30 April 1842 but died on 11 November 1843. On 2 March 1846, his diary talks of walking with his “wife and children”. Another girl was born on 4 August 1847 but his diary intimates that she died in December 1848. However, no mention of this is made in W Elfe Tayler's book. Tayler also writes that, whilst dying from stomach cancer, Craik was cared for by his wife and daughter. Another son, also named George, was born on 20 December 1849 and another unnamed boy on 17 September 1853.

Craik's eldest brother was the writer and literary critic George Lillie Craik.

== Writings ==
- Principia Hebraica; or, an Easy Introduction to the Hebrew Language (1831, ²1864)
- Improved Renderings of those Passages in the English Version of the New Testament which are capable of being more correctly translated (1835, ²1866)
- Pastoral Letters (1837, ²1848, ³1863)
- An Amended Translation of the Epistle to the Hebrews (1847)
- The Popery of Protestantism (1852)
- The Hebrew Language. Its History and Characteristics, including improved renderings of select passages in our Authorized translation of the Old Testament (1860)
- On the Revision of the English Bible (1860)
- The Distinguishing Characteristics and Essential Relationships of the leading Languages of Asia and Europe (1860)
- New Testament Church Order. Five Lectures (1863)
- The Authority of Scripture Considered in Relation to Christian Union. A Lecture (1863)
- Brief Reply to certain Misrepresentations contained in “Essays and Reviews” (n.d.)
- Biblical Expositions, Lectures, Sketches of Sermons, &c. (ed. by William Elfe Tayler, 1867)
