= Rosa C. Petherick =

Children's book illustrator

- Born: September , 1871; Addiscombe, Croydon, London
- Died: 20 December 1931 (aged 60)
- Occupations: Illustrator, painter, and musician
- Years active: 1892-1937
- Known for: Painting children with toys
- Notable work: "Dora" showing her young sister slumped with a violin

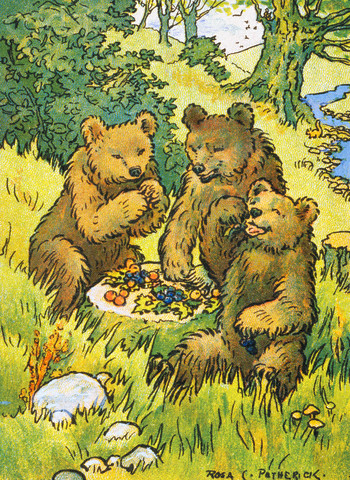
Illustration depicting three picnicking bears by Petherick

Rosa Clementina Petherick (September 1871 – 20 December 1931) was a British book illustrator.

== Early life and family ==
Born in Addiscombe, Croydon, she was the eldest of the five surviving daughters of the artist Horace William Petherick (1839–1919) and his wife Clementina Augusta Bewley Petherick, née Bonny (1837-1909). (Note: Houfe speculated that Rosa might be Horace Petherick's daughter (p.413) and Peppin repeated the speculation (p.233)) Rosa's elder brother Horace Claude (1867-1869) and elder sister Adeline Maude (1869-1872) both died in early childhood.

The children who survived to adulthood were:

- Rosa Clementina (1872-1931),
- Ada Flora (1874-1924),
- Leila Helena (1876-1951),
- Eveline May (1880-1936),
- Dora Valentine (1881-1946).

All the children grew up in the family home at Maple Lodge, 25 Havelock Road, Addiscombe, Surrey, where their parents lived their whole married lives. Only one of the five girls ever married, the youngest, Dora (1881-1946). She married Albert H. Gilson, a violin and cello repairer, in Croydon in 1922.

Rosa was already an accomplished artist by 1892, when she painted her younger sister Dora slumped in a chair with a violin in her hand.

=== A musical family ===
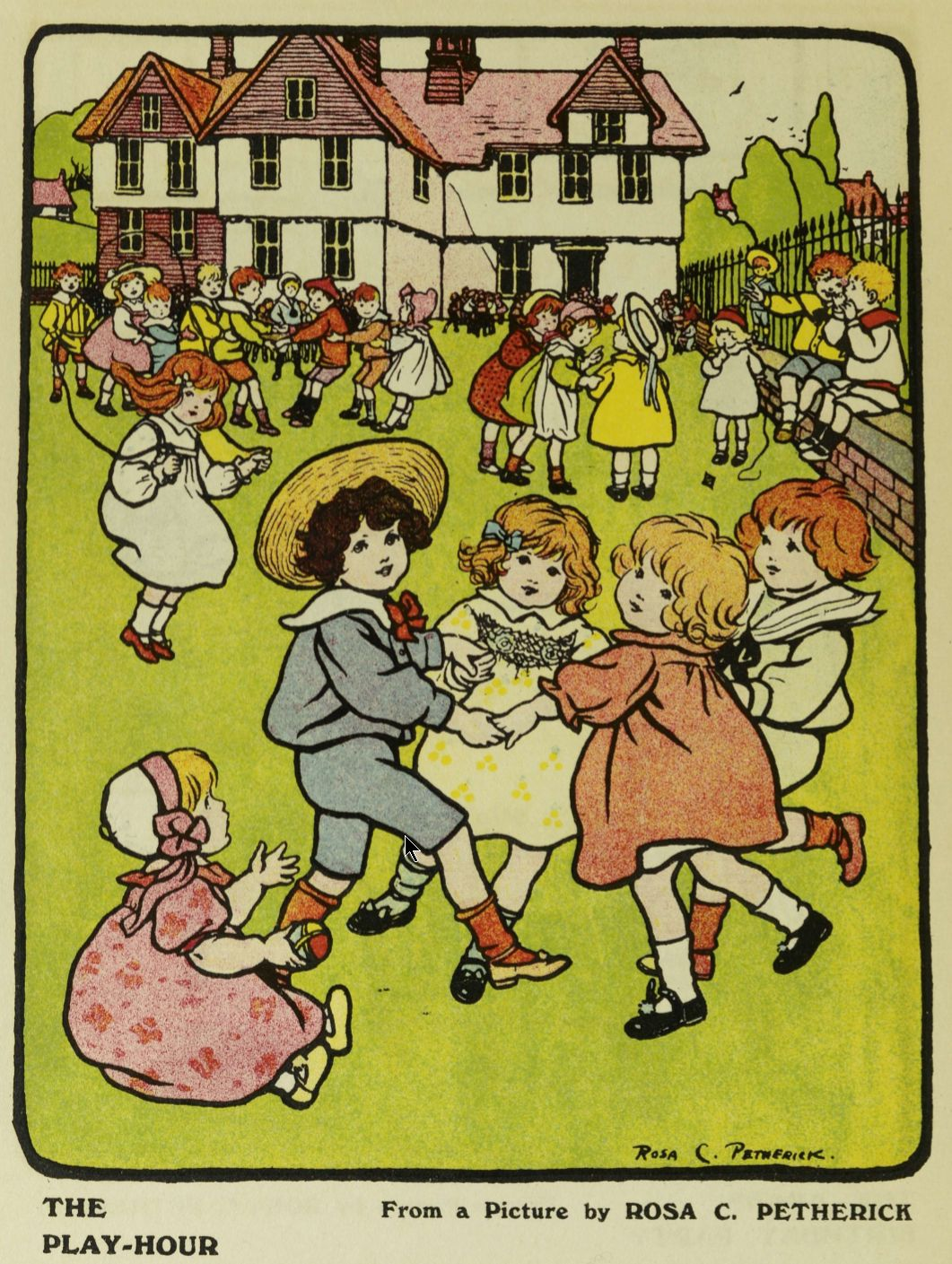
The play hour by Rosa C. Petherick from First Steps. From the Osborne Collection. Courtesy of the Toronto Public Library

Her four sisters were talented musicians and played as the Petherick Quartet from about 1905 onwards. The Strad, the leading periodical of the time dealing with stringed instruments and their music, mentions the quartet five times from April 1905 to March 1908. The Violinist report that they played at the Mozart Society Concert on 15 January 1910. Although Rosa did not play in her sister's quartet she was also a musician. She played briefly in the Streatham Symphony Orchestra in 1920–21.

=== Design competitions ===
Houfe notes that Rosa Petherick participated in design competitions in The Studio. Rosa got honorable mentions for competitions in The Studio:

- in June 1896 for designing a private note-paper heading.
- in August 1896 for a black and white drawing of Summer.
- in November 1900 for an illustration for a Child's Story.

She also won honourable mentions for competitions in The International Studio in July 1897 for the following:

- Design for the title page of a Christmas Card
- Illustration in pen and ink work for The Canterbury Tales
- Study of a Female Head

== Works ==
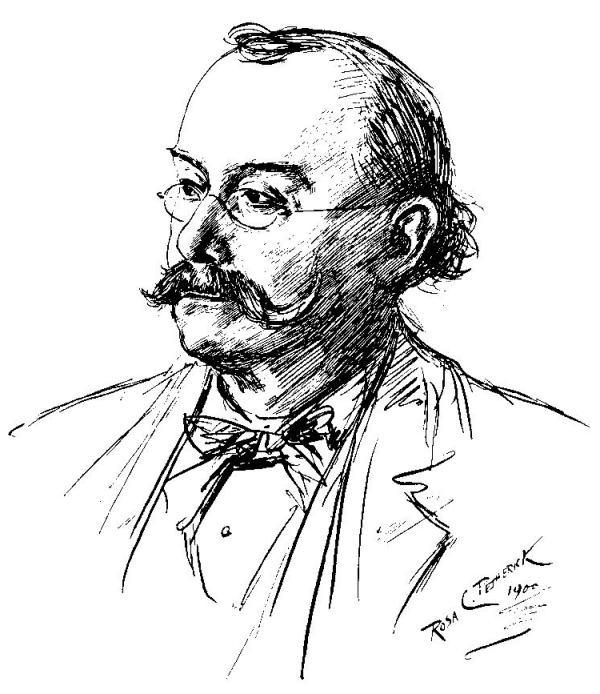
Horace William Petherick drawn by Rosa in 1900

In 1900, She drew the portrait of her father that he used as the frontispiece for his books on Antonio Stradivari and on Repairing and Restoring Violins.

She contributed illustrations to numerous children's story books, annuals and periodicals, particularly those produced by Blackie and Son Limited. According to her obituary in The Times, her etchings could be found in the National Portrait Gallery. Peppin states that although here work was pleasing in appearance it was somewhat bland and was characterised by uniformly heavy outlines.

The British Library Catalogue has 55 of her works listed. The Museum of Croydon has 48 of her works in the Croydon Art Collection. However, this is probably only part of her total output. AbeBooks listed over 60 different titles for sale on 9 February 2020 to which she had contributed. She specialised in paintings and drawings of children with their toys, and commonly shows the children at play with each other or with their toys. Most of her work was for very young children, but she did illustrate a few books, school stories mainly, for older children including:

- Avery, Harold (1903). Sale's Sharpshooters: The historical Records of a Very Irregular Corps. London: Nelson.
- Avery, Harold (1906). The House on the Moor - A School Tale. London: Nelson.
- Adams, Ellinor Lily Davenport (1920). On Honour: A School and Home Story. London: Nelson.
- Cowper, E. E. (1921). Celia Win. London: Collins.
- Oxenham, Elsie J. (1926). The Abbey Girls in Town. London: Collins.
- Cowper, E. E. (1927). Cross Winds Farm; or, the Adventure of the silver foxes. London: Chambers.
- Grant, Pamela (1932). The Fortunes of Billy. London: Collins.
- Grant, Pamela (1933). The Pranks of Doria. London: Sunshine Press.

However, in some cases, the illustrations by her were limited to a single colour frontispiece, and in any case the few examples were vastly outnumbered by the books for much younger children, some of which has illustrations on almost every page.

There are 22 books illustrated by her in the Osborne and Lillian H. Smith Collections of children's books at the Toronto Public Library, of which six are available as public domain eBooks. Links for the six eBooks can be found in the external links below.

Rosa died in Brighton on 20 December 1931. Her second youngest sister, Eveline May, acted as her executor with a final estate of £1,530 18s 4d.
