= Architecture of the London Borough of Croydon =

Building styles in London borough

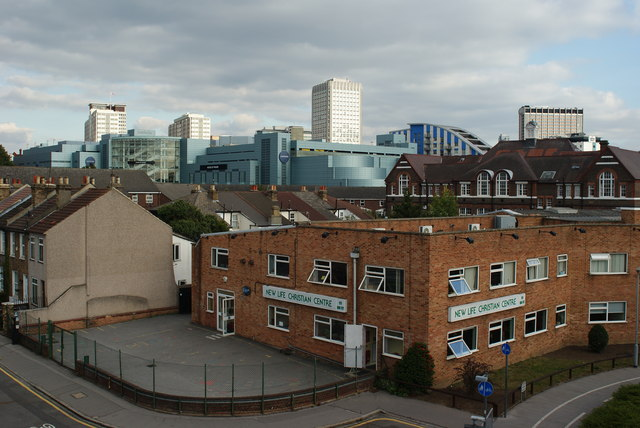
View towards Central Croydon from Pitlake Bridge

The London Borough of Croydon has a wide variety of buildings mainly from post-war through to modern. Much of the modern architecture in the borough is centred on the commercial centre of the town, with much of the Victorian designs spread out on both the northern and southern corridors of the borough. Many former warehouses and factories have been converted for other uses changing the external appearance of Croydon erratically.

Croydon also has a number of high rise buildings. Most were built during the sixties and seventies. However, in the last few years there has been a renewed interest in constructing tall buildings in Croydon. Numerous residential and office blocks are being built or have recently been built in the town centre. In 2023, Ten Degrees Croydon overtook Saffron Square as Croydon's tallest building.

== Buildings of interest in Croydon ==
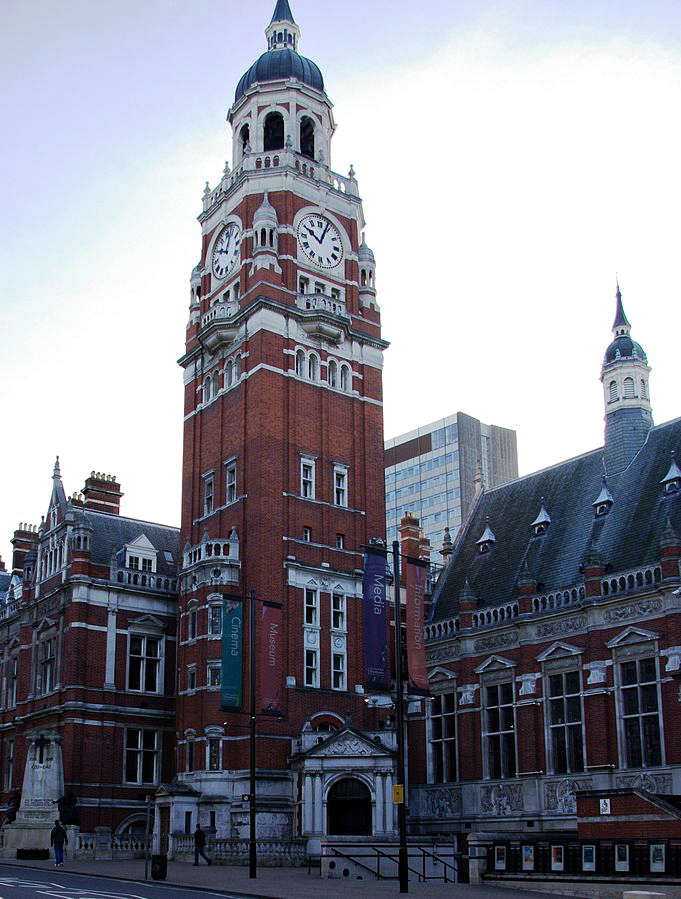
Croydon Town Hall an example of Croydon architecture in 1892–1896 to a design by Charles Henman

- The Fairfield Halls, home of the Ashcroft Theatre.
- No. 1 Croydon.
- Beddington Zero Energy Development (BedZED), an environmentally friendly housing development, shortlisted for the Stirling Prize in 2003.
- Croydon Sports Arena, the home of Croydon Football Club.
- Airport House.
- Ashburton Learning Village, Woodside.
- Croydon College.
- The Braithwaite Hall, used for concerts and conferences.
- Museum of Croydon.
- Croydon Central Library, Croydon Clocktower, by Charles Henman Jun.
- Croydon Town Hall, extended by a bridge to council offices.
- The Swan and Sugarloaf public house, in South Croydon.
- Croydon Park Hotel, behind Altitude 25.
- Selhurst Park, the home of Crystal Palace Football Club.
- Queen's Gardens.
- Centrale.
- The Whitgift School.
- The Whitgift Centre.
- Croydon Parish Church.
- Harris Academy South Norwood
- The BRIT School, the only state-funded school dedicated to the performing arts, media, art and design and the technologies that make performance possible
- East Croydon station ( Trains to Gatwick and Luton), the busiest railway station in Greater South London.
- South Norwood Leisure Centre
- St John the Evangelist, Upper Norwood
- Warehouse Theatre. (Demolished in 2013).
- Allders, formerly the fourth largest department store in Britain. As of 2017 the building is in use as a multi-franchise retail outlet.
- The IKEA Towers
- Saffron Square, tallest building in Croydon from 2017-2023.

== Recent developments ==
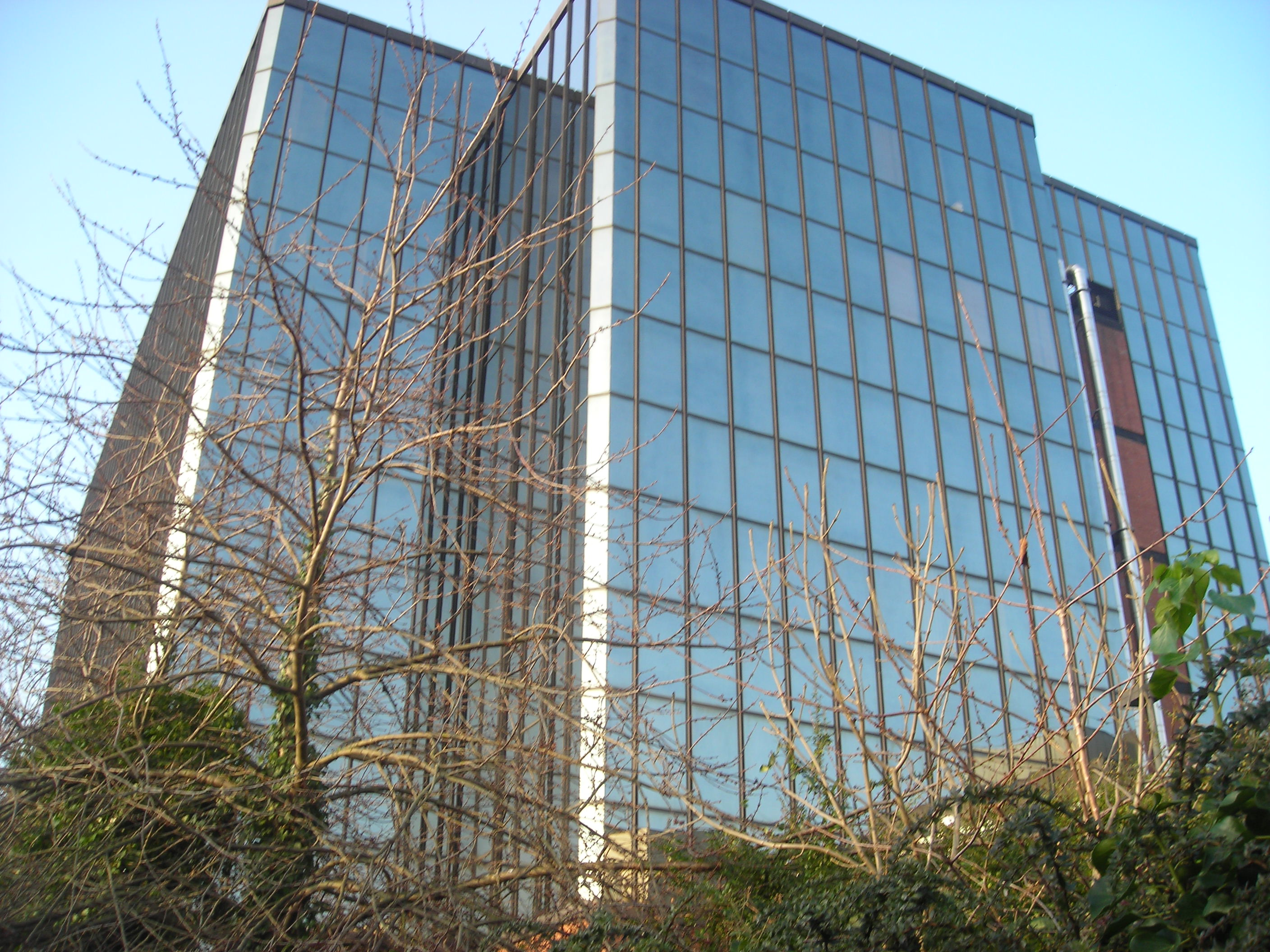
41 Cherry Orchard Road next to East Croydon station. An example of Croydon's newer low-rise buildings.

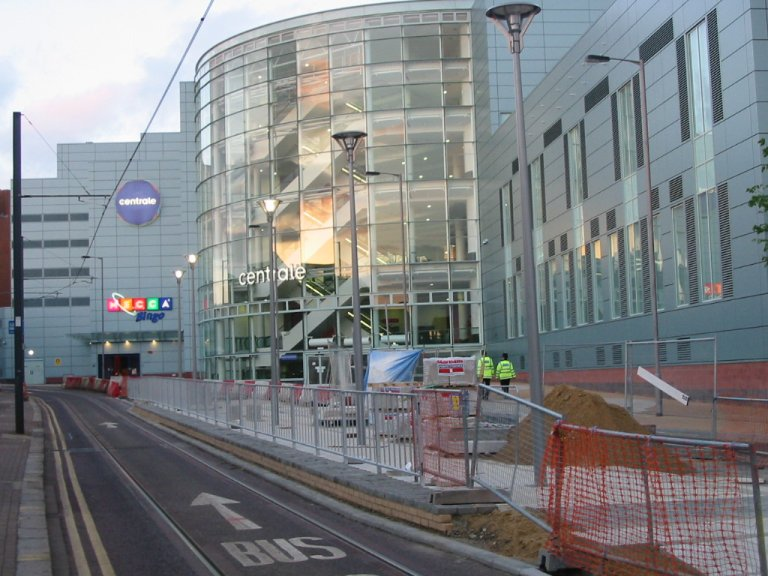
Centrale shopping centre, managed by St Martins Property Group was completed in 2004 and includes a House of Fraser store

Under the Labour-run council since 1990, Croydon has witnessed a new period of construction. Prompted by the regeneration of the centre of Croydon. It features mainly office buildings designed by separate architects. Many of the new buildings in the past couple of years have been mainly low-rise. The Beddington Zero Energy Development in Beddington was designed by Bill Dunster. The project was conducted as a partnership between the BioRegional Development Group, the Peabody Trust, Bill Dunster Architects, Arup, and Gardiner and Theobald as cost consultants. The project is designed to use only energy from renewable sources generated on site. In addition to 777m² of solar panels, tree waste fuels the development's cogeneration plant (downdraft gasifier) to provide district heating and electricity.

Other large-scale projects include the major Centrale shopping centre development by The Birmingham Alliance, which replaced the former C&A store and the 1980s Drummond Centre which had fallen out of favour with the public. The new shopping centre was completed in 2004 and is managed by St Martins Property Group. The building has been designed to maximise the view of West Croydon from the eastern windows including the IKEA Towers landmarks on Purley Way. The building also has solar panels on the roof. The shopping centre features the high-end retailer House of Fraser which takes up most of the southern side of the centre. In Croydon, the College Green area has seen the construction of a new building for the Croydon Sixth Form College, Croydon Skills and Enterprise College and the Croydon Higher Education College. Many large-scale projects are proposed as part of the Croydon Vision 2020 regeneration plan.

One of the most recent buildings to be constructed and opened within the northern half of the borough is Penoyre & Prasad's £25m Ashburton Learning Village at Woodside which was partially opened in September 2006. The flagship building is home to Ashburton Community School, the Croydon Music Service, Ashburton Library and the Continuing Education and Training Service (CETS). Special features of the complex praised by energy minister Malcolm Wicks, include the building having the largest solar panels to be installed in any building inside the United Kingdom. The former Formula One world champion, John Surtees who was a former student of the school joined architect Greg Penoyre, who designed the flagship building and the Mayor of Croydon at an open day to officially launch the complex.

Another recently built building is East Croydon station, one of the busiest in Greater London. The present East Croydon station building was opened on 19 August 1992. It consists of a large steel and glass frame suspended from a lightweight steel structure that straddles the track and platforms to a much greater extent than was possible with its Victorian predecessor. Four steel ladder masts anchor the glass box and the whole gives the impression of a suspension bridge that stretches into the distance. External canopies cover the entrances, a cafes open-air seating area and the approaches to the tram station. 440 m² of glass were used in the roof and 800 m² for the wall glazing. The architects were Alan Brookes Associates, who also made the close by NLA Tower, and the structural engineers YRM Anthony Hunt Associates.

Being a key destination in the south for entertainment, Croydon recently opened the Croydon Grants. The Grants, towering over Surrey Street Market and in the shadow of the Croydon Clocktower. Inside the main attraction is a 10-screen Vue cinema, which was formerly a Warner Village. Although there are many other attractions, including a Reflex 80's Bar, Virgin Active, Nandos, Tiger Tiger and Lloyds No.1 Bar. The building is situated on five floors, with the top two being used by the cinema.

== Future developments ==
Further new projects are planned for the city under the Croydon Vision 2020 regeneration plan. Croydon's ambition to become "London's Third City" is a result of increased investment in the town and has led to some of South London's most ambitious non-residential schemes in the past ten years. Plans include the construction of a new shopping centre to replace St George's Walk and older properties on George Street.

Ruskin Square is the latest focus of major developments in the centre of Croydon following the demolition of various buildings there, including Wettern House. The Gateway site, a former railway goods yard which has been largely unoccupied since the 1960s, represents the largest single development opportunity in the district. Although there has been considerable interest in the site since the late 1980s by Stanhope, another party has also been interested in the site. Arrowcroft, which has received backing from both the former Labour and the current Conservative administration, has made the development of any project halted repeatedly. The problem is that Stanhope already owns part of the site, and without them selling it to Arrowcroft or Arrowcroft losing interest in the site no building work can commence. The Secretary of State will announce which plan will be granted the compulsory purchase order in mid 2008 after the public inquiry. The proposed scheme from Stanhope called Ruskin Square, named after John Ruskin, incorporates four blocks of office accommodation totalling 99,174 m², a health and fitness centre, a replacement Warehouse Theatre, an urban park and 560 residential units, with 50% affordable housing on a 3.4-hectare (8.4-acre) site bounded by George Street, Dingwall Road and Lansdowne Road. There would be a 41-storey skyscraper which is intended to act as the defining feature of Croydon's planned revival. Occupiers of the retail and restaurant units could include names like Carluccio's, Strada, Café Rouge, Giraffe, Las Iguanas, Wagamama, Ciao Baby, Pizza Express, Loch Fyne and All Bar One. Foster + Partners are the principal architects of the scheme. The other scheme that carries the original name has backing from the local council. The plan incorporates a state-of-the-art 12,500 seat arena designed to attract world-class performers and international sporting events. Business conferences and dinners could also be held there, and community activities encouraged through the development of a bespoke community plan. In addition to the arena, the proposals include a mix of shops, restaurants, cafes, bars and a new 9,425 sqm food store. 640,000 sq ft (59,000 m^{2}). of offices, 874 new homes, both affordable and private with a landmark tower, a health and fitness centre and a community health centre, a pedestrian plaza and a replacement Warehouse theatre. The result from the High Court is expected in June 2008.

On the site of the Fairfield Building of Croydon College, a mixed-use development named the Croydon Vocational Tower had begun construction. The planned architecture and design of the building had similarities with the Trump International Hotel and Tower in Chicago. Planning permission was approved by Croydon Council in February 2007, but building work had been slow since. It was to be used for both educational purposes on the lower 10 floors by the college and private use as a residential tower on the rest of the 29 floors. There would have also been a floor of leisure use which would be used by students of the college and residents of the tower. The building, once finished, would have a structural height of 134 m (439 ft) with the tower measuring 119.8 m in height to the top of the lift motor room, with an architectural spire protruding above this to a height of 133.8 m. As of 2025, the site had been used for a different construction project, Enclave: Croydon, which was completed in 2023.

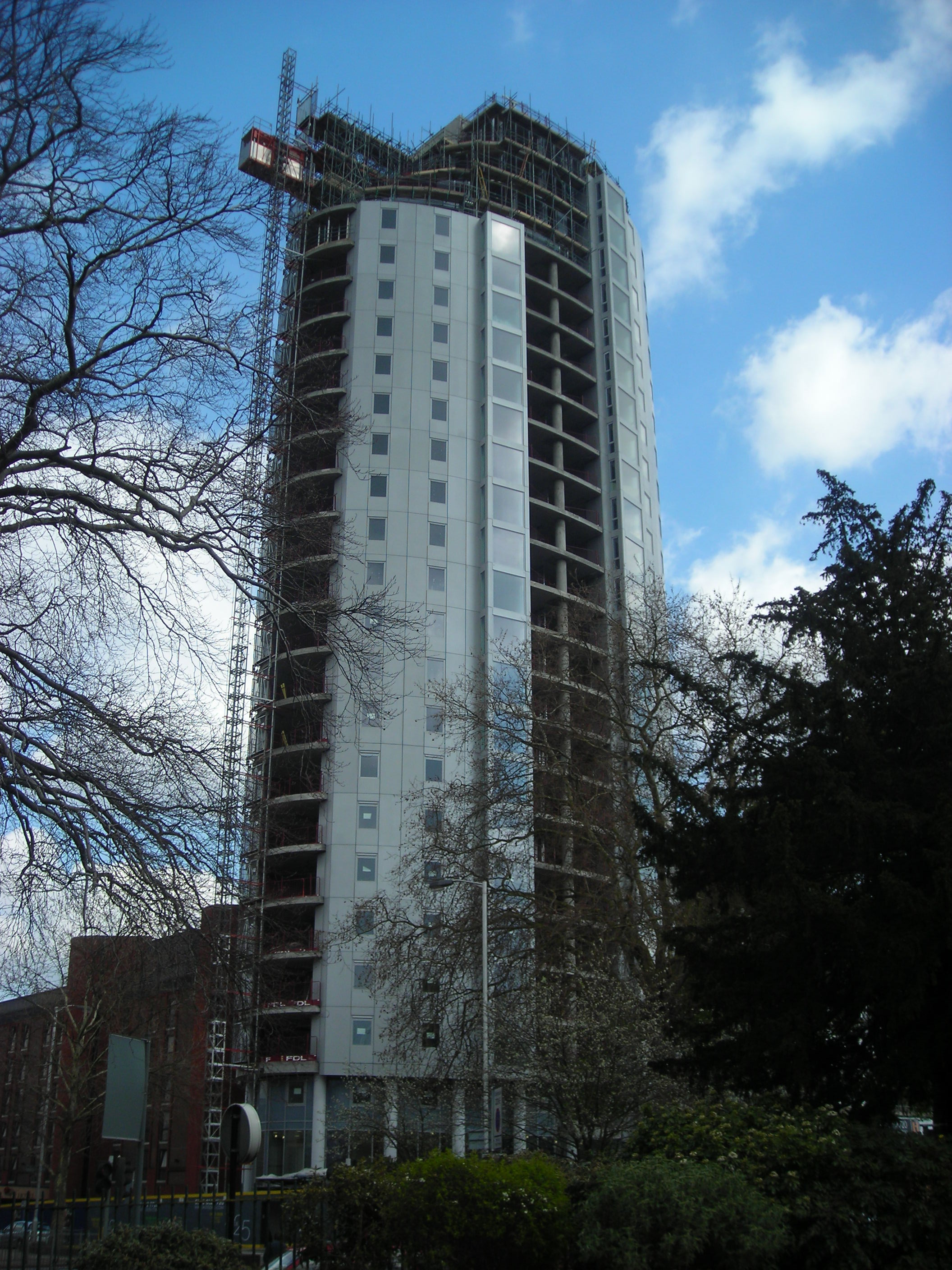
Altitude 25 while under construction in early 2008. When finished it became Croydon's tallest building until surpassed by Saffron Square in 2016.

Highrise structures are being proposed in large numbers. In recent years, the development of tall buildings has been encouraged in the London Plan, which will lead to the erection of new skyscrapers over the next few years as London goes through a high-rise boom. Construction of the Altitude 25 residential skyscraper, at a cost of €85m (£57m), began in 2006 and is due to be completed in 2008. The development is intended to regenerate a brownfield site three minutes' walk from East Croydon railway station.

The Croydon Expo took place during May 2007, around the borough of Croydon. The main display of the future of the town centre can still be seen in the Central Library. The expo was a chance for residents and businesses to see what the future of Croydon would hold in the next decade. There have also been exhibitions for districts of Croydon, including Waddon, South Norwood and Woodside, Purley, New Addington, and Coulsdon. The main point of Croydon Exp07 was to showcase the projects included in the Croydon Vision 2020 regeneration plan to the public. One of these projects included in the Expo was the Cultural Quarter. This project, devised by Howard Holdings, will include Croydon Parish Church, Bridgehouse, and The Exchange. It will include a new piazza, shops, and a theatre right in the centre of the Old Town. The Cultural Quarter will be situated between Surrey Street and Church Road, the oldest surviving part of Central Croydon. It is all projected to cost around €29m, and is due to be completed by 2009 as it is already under construction. The new urban space will regenerate a Grade II listed former pumping station and a historic market. The adjacent bridge house will provides 74 affordable apartments and sits above a ground and mezzanine retail space. A new bridge links this building with the area's principal shopping street. The block wraps around an existing multi-storey car park, creating a back-drop to the open public space. New voids are opened up under the car park, making space for shops and cafés to open out onto the square. Opposite sits a former telephone exchange that is converted into a further 66 apartments. A mixture of green and brown roofs along with off-site renewable energy provision form part of the environmental measures incorporated into the regeneration. Located in the Cultural Quarter, the 150-year-old, castle-style pumping station is an established local icon and an attractive visual feature of the history of Croydon. The council believes the building could become an ideal base for creative businesses such as advertising, architecture, the art and antiques market, crafts, design, designer fashion, film and video, interactive leisure software, music, the performing arts, publishing, software and computer games, television and radio. These would contribute to the culture of the area. The owner, who already has planning permission for gym and leisure facilities, has expressed a willingness to work with the council to find other appropriate uses. Atkins, Walters & Webster was selected as the architects to redesign the Bridge House and Exchange developments.

== See also ==
- List of tallest buildings and structures in the London Borough of Croydon
- Architecture of London
