= List of tallest buildings and structures in the London Borough of Croydon =

Tall buildings in Croydon
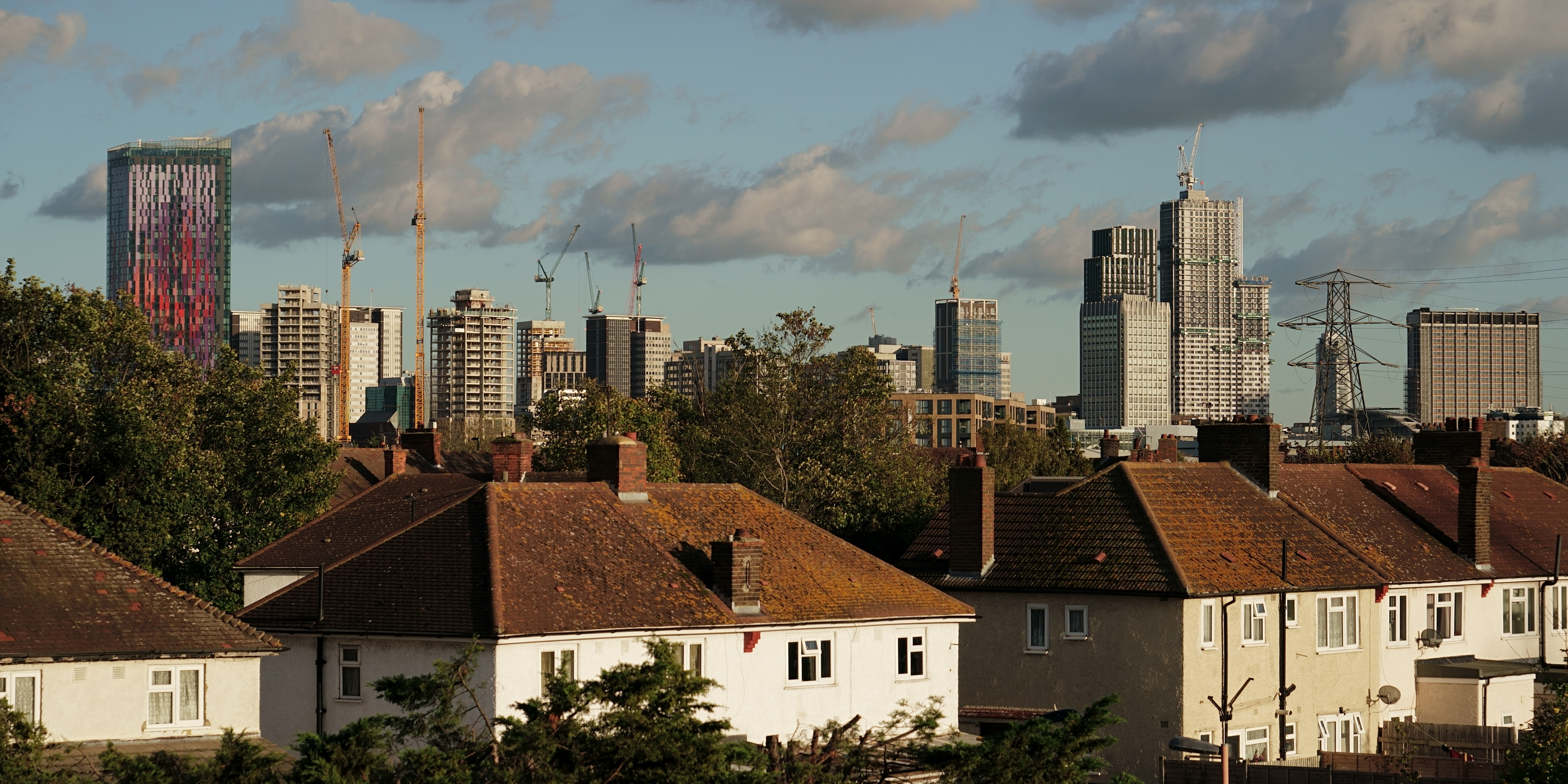
- Croydon skyline in 2022
- Tallest building: College Road (2022)
- Tallest building height: 163 m (535 ft)

Number of tall buildings
- Taller than 50 m (164 ft): 25
- Taller than 100 m (328 ft): 4

This list of the tallest buildings and structures in Croydon ranks buildings and structures in the London Borough of Croydon, England by height. The borough of Croydon, a local government district of Greater London, has a population of 330,587. At its core is Croydon, a former market town, with interests in producing charcoal, tanned leather, and brewing.

== History ==
In contrast to the vast majority of London's tallest buildings, most of Croydon's high-rises were constructed in the 1960s and 70s as part of a project to create the South of England's largest office space outside of Central London. However, since then many of these office blocks have become outdated and some of the early high-rise buildings have subsequently been demolished, to allow for new skyscrapers to be constructed in their place. More recently, a new redevelopment programme for the town centre, called Croydon Vision 2020 was announced. The town has since witnessed a boom in the construction of high rise apartments, such as IYLO and Altitude 25, a former brownfield site.

For 38 years, the tallest building in Croydon was the No. 1 Croydon (formerly the NLA Tower), a high-rise office block, which was completed in 1970, until 2009, when Altitude 25, a residential high-rise complex, was completed. Saffron Square became the tallest building in Croydon in 2016 at 134 metres tall, but was overtaken by 101 George Street, the current tallest building in Croydon in 2019. The current tallest building is College Road which topped out in 2022 at 163 metres, and is also the Europe's tallest modular building.

In December 2022, Croydon Council (Conservative run) was warned by Councillor Patricia Hay-Justice (Labour), in a meeting of Council officers and planning officials that Croydon is not Manhattan and that the suburb should not resemble New York City in a row over a new skyscraper development.

== Tallest completed buildings ==
The tallest completed buildings above 50 metres (164 ft).

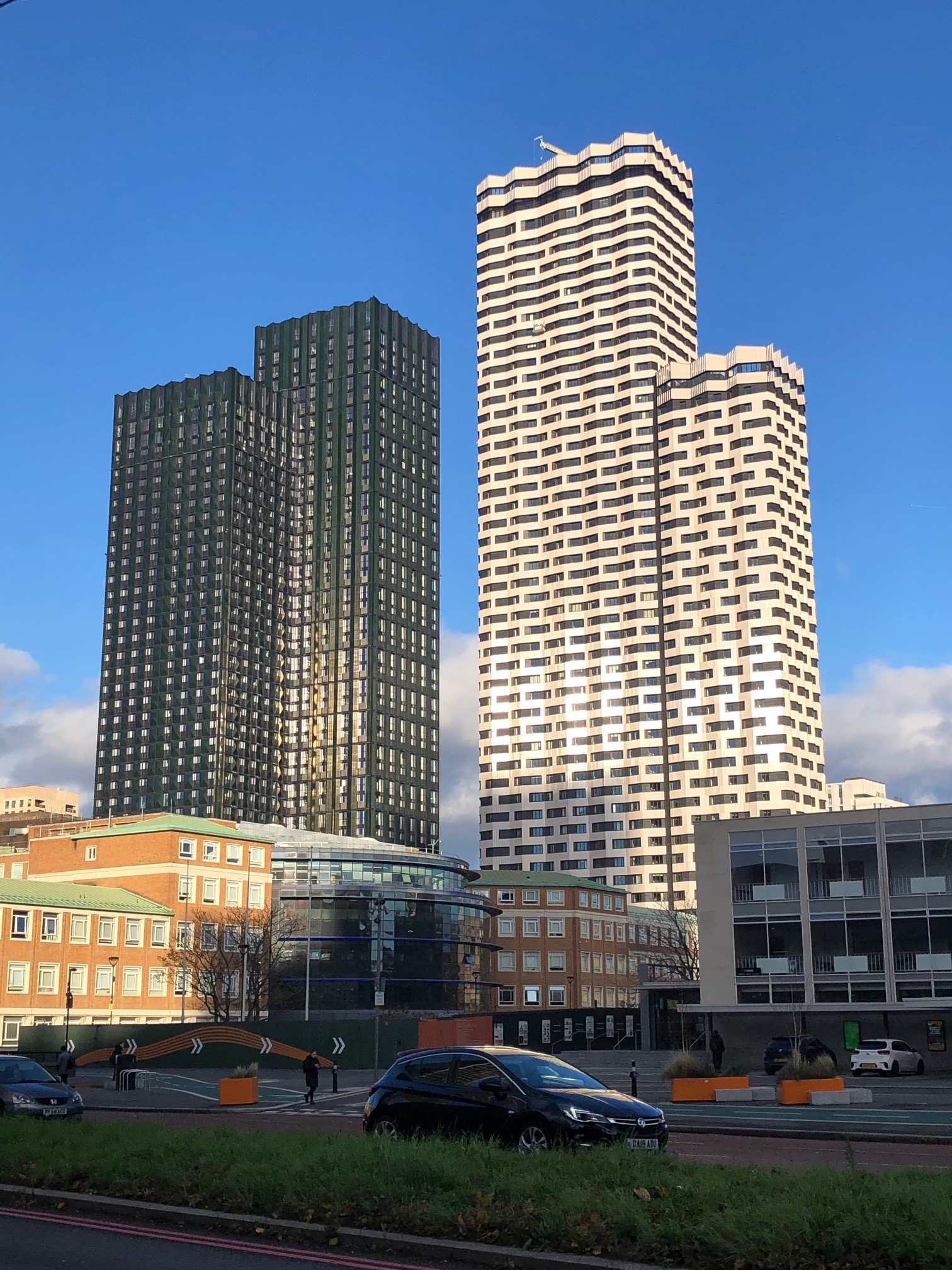
101 George Street (135.6m, left) and College Road Tower (163m, right). Tallest two buildings in Croydon.

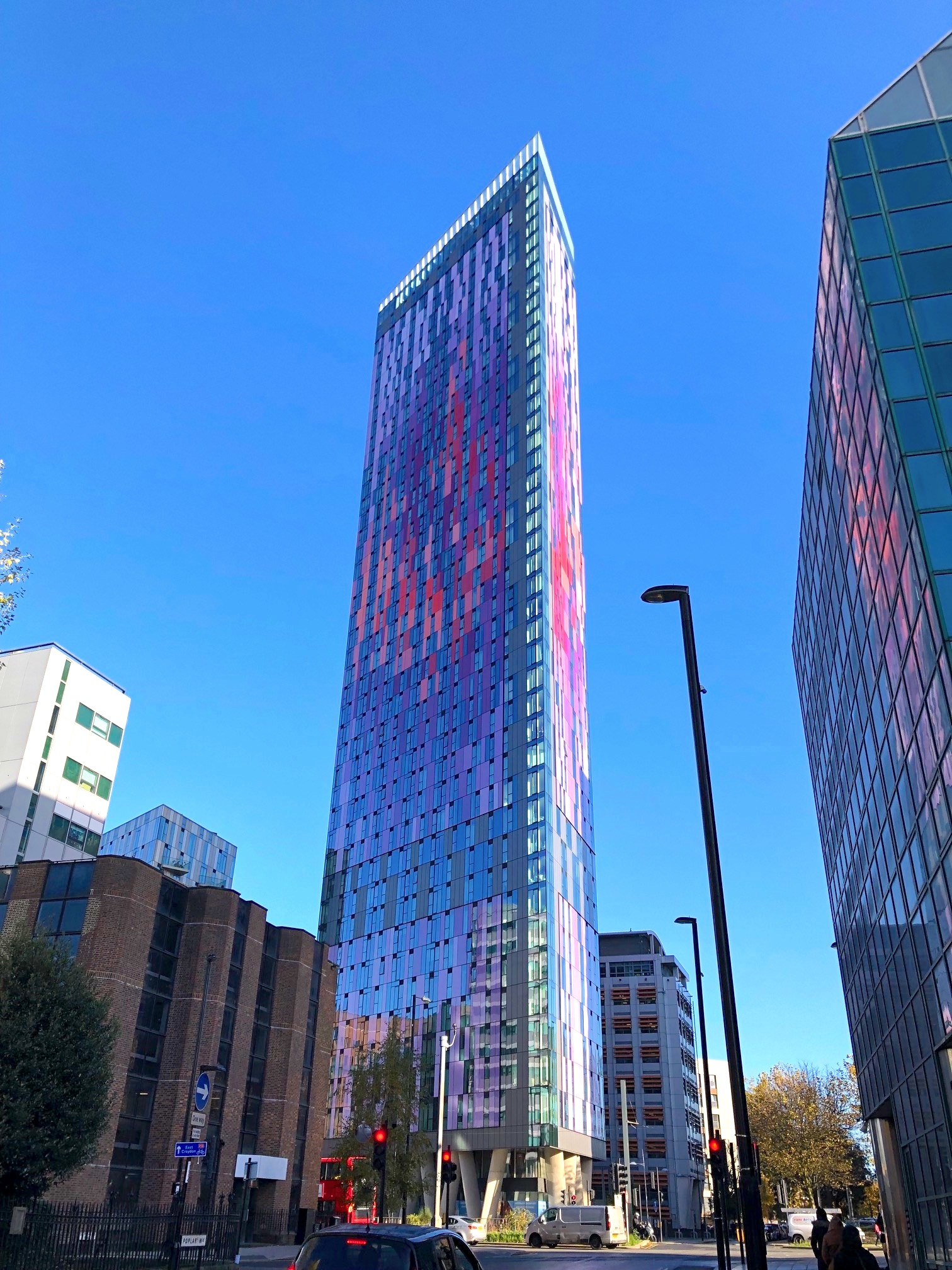
Saffron Square is the third tallest building in Croydon at 134 metres.

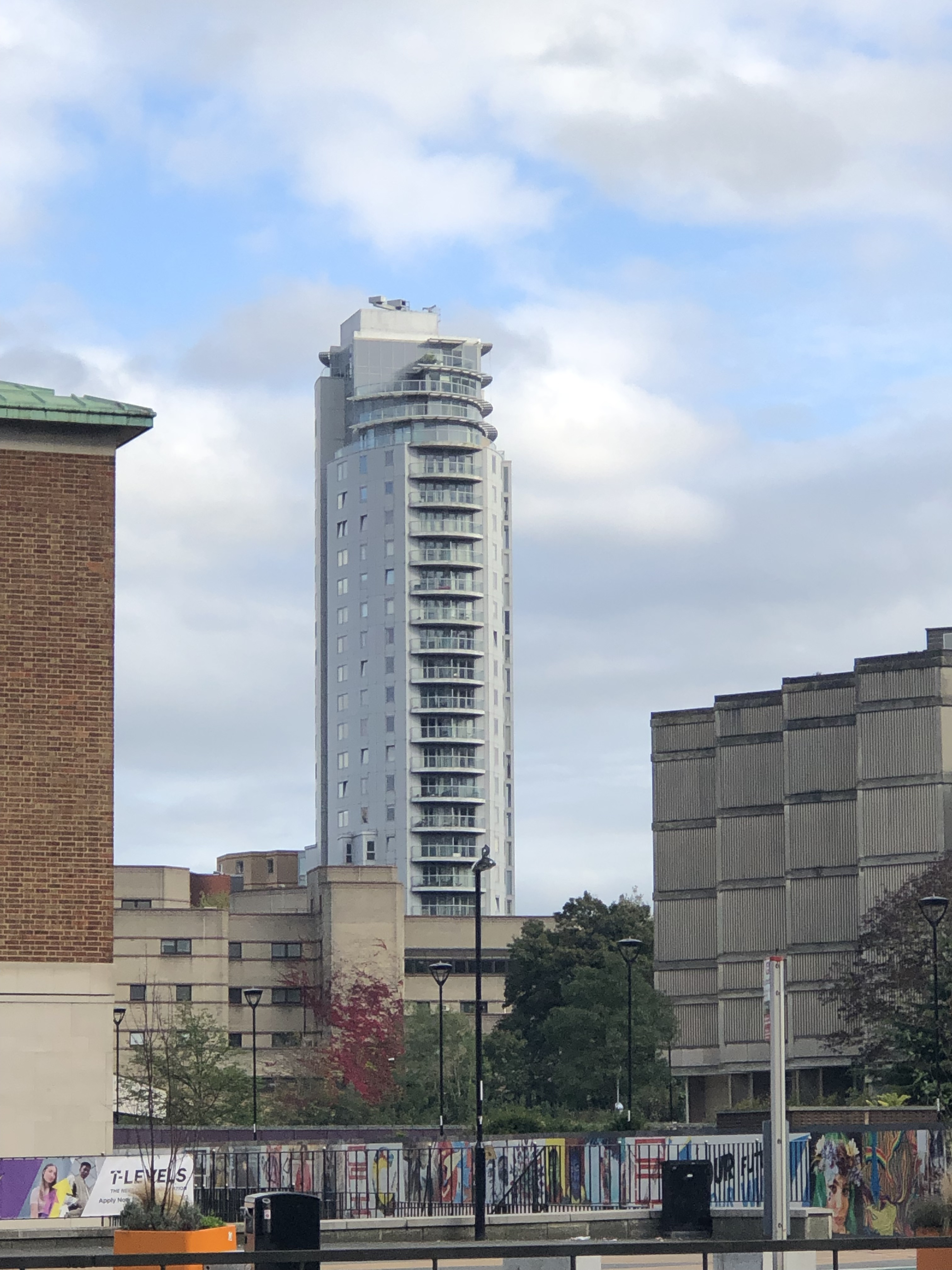
Altitude 25 is Croydon's fifth tallest building at 94 metres.

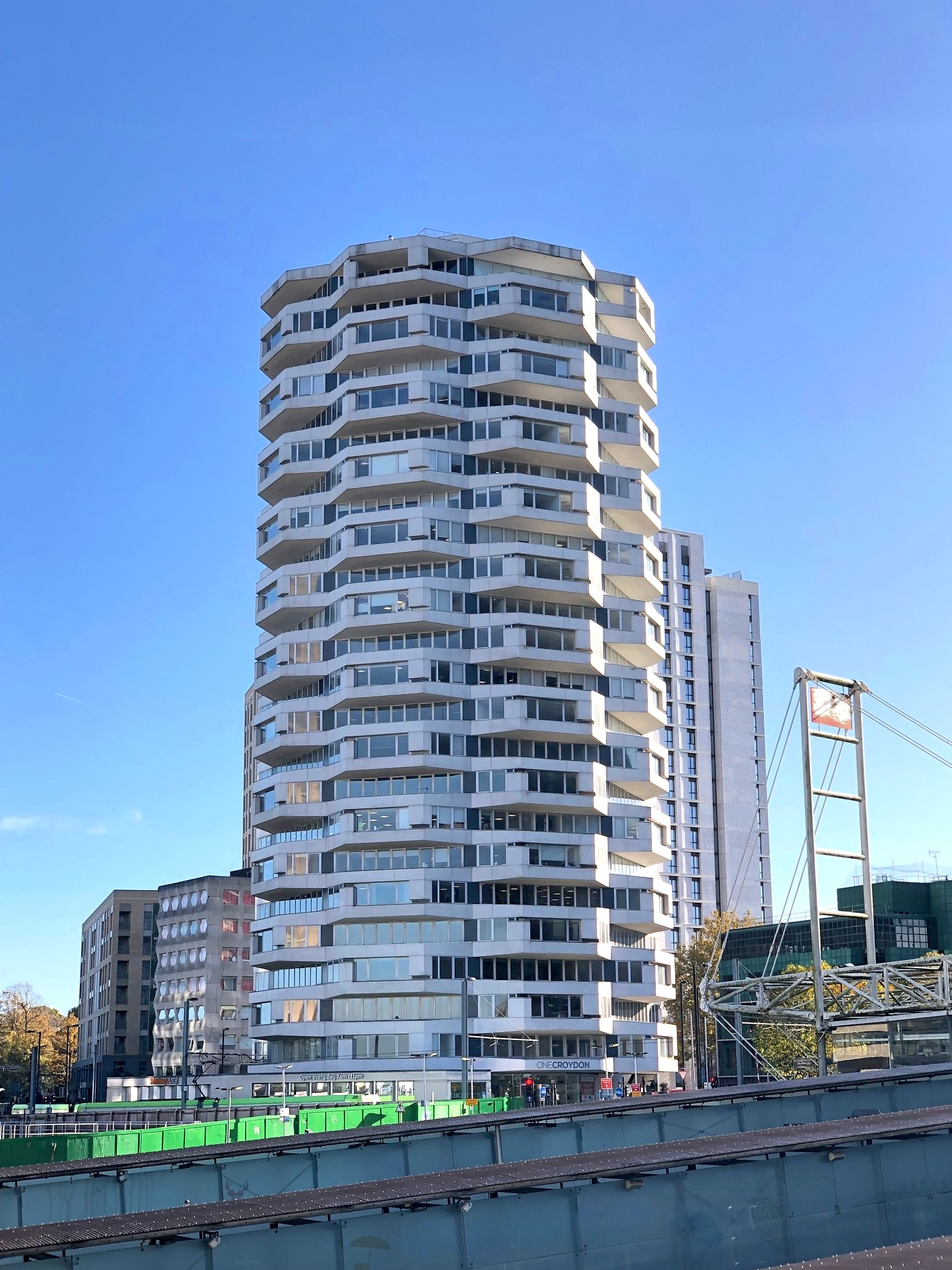
The NLA Tower/No. 1 Croydon was the tallest building in Croydon for 38 years until 2009.

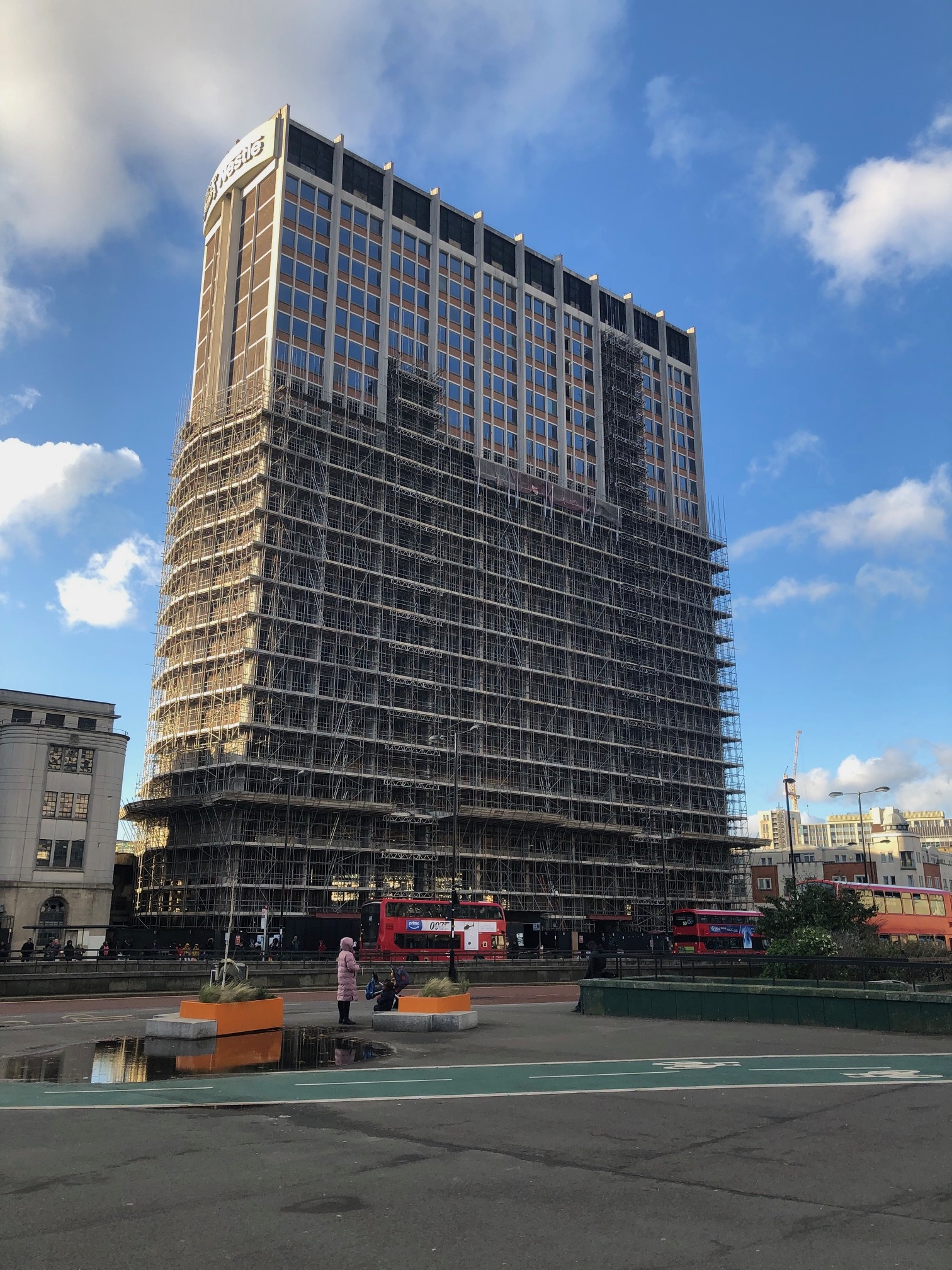
Nestlé Tower, Croydon, undergoing refurbishment in November 2023.

Rank	Name	Built	Use	Height m / ft	Floors	Notes
1	College Road	2022	Residential	163 / 535	50	
2	101 George Street	2019	Residential	136 / 446	44	
3	Saffron Square	2016	Residential	134 / 440	44	
4	Fold Building Queen's Quarter	2021	Residential	114 / 374	35	
5	Altitude 25	2009	Residential	94 / 308	26	
6	Morello North	2022	Residential	89 / 292	25	
7	Morello South	2022	Residential	89 / 292	25	
8	Cambridge House	2022	Residential	83 / 272	26	
9	No. 1 Croydon	1970	Office	82 / 269	24	
10	Nestlé Tower	1964	Office	79 / 259	24	
11	Whitgift Centre Tower	1970	Office	77 / 253	21	
12	Addiscombe Grove	2020	Residential	72 / 236	21	
13	Leon House	1966	Residential	71 / 233	22	
14	Malcolm Wicks House	2021	Residential	71 / 233	21	
15	Pembroke House	1967	Office	70 / 230	19	
16	Ryland House	1977	Office	66 / 217	15	
17	Chorus Apartments	2021	Residential	64 / 210	20	
18	Lunar House	1970	Office	64 / 210	19	
19	Apollo House	1970	Office	64 / 210	19	
20	Southern House	1967	Office	63 / 207	19	
21	Newgate Tower (formerly IYLO)	2014	Residential	61 / 200	20	
22	Whitgift Centre East	1969	Retail	55 / 180	17	
23	Whitgift Centre West	1969	Retail	55 / 180	17	
24	Carolyn House	1984	Office	55 / 180	16	
25	Delta Point	1985	Office	55 / 180	15	

== Tallest structures ==
The two tallest structures, as of the beginning of 2008, in Croydon are listed below. Structures which have been demolished are not included. A structure differs from a high-rise by its lack of floors and habitability.

Rank	Name	Built	Use	Height		Location
Rank	Name	Built	Use	metres	feet	Location
1	Croydon transmitting station	1962	Telecoms	153	502	Upper Norwood
2	IKEA Towers	1950	Power station chimneys			Purley Way

== Tallest under construction or approved ==
The tallest under construction or approved buildings above or equal to 60 metres (197 ft), as of the beginning of 2013, in Croydon are listed below.

=== Summary ===
Rank	Name	Use	Height		Floors	Notes	Status
Rank	Name	Use	metres	feet	Floors	Notes	Status
1	One Lansdowne Road Tower 1	Residential	164	538	50	Proposal for two residential towers in Croydon. Previous application was withdrawn by the developer in 2022. Revised proposal approved December 2024.	Approved
2	Botanical House	Residential	124	407	36	Proposal a new residential tower in Croydon.	Approved
3	One Lansdowne Road Tower 2	Residential	118	388	35	Proposal for two residential towers in Croydon. Previous application was withdrawn by the developer in 2022. Revised proposal approved December 2024.	Approved
4	Leon Quarter Block A	Residential	102	335	29		Under Construction
5	St Michael's Square (Tower A)	Residential	83	272	25		Under Construction
5	St Michael's Square (Tower B)	Residential	83	272	21		Under Construction

== Timeline of tallest buildings and structures ==
Croydon's skyline has been built up mostly since the mid-20th century. No. 1 Croydon held the title of tallest structure in Croydon for 38 years until Altitude 25 is built. This was replaced in 2016 by Saffron Square, a 2016 Carbuncle Cup-nominated high-rise completed as part of Croydon Vision 2020. Other high-rise buildings proposed to be built under the programme include the taller Morello Tower (171m) and One Landsdowne Road (228m).

Years tallest	Name	Use	Height		Floors	Notes
Years tallest	Name	Use	metres	feet	Floors	Notes
1964–1970	Nestlé Tower	Office	79	260	24	
1970–2008	NLA Tower	Office	82	270	24	
2008–2016	Altitude 25	Residential	94	307	26	
2016–2019	Saffron Square	Residential	134	440	44	
2019–2022	101 George Street	Residential	135.6	444	44	
2022–present	College Road	Residential	163	535	50	

== See also ==
- List of tallest structures in the United Kingdom
- List of tallest buildings and structures in London
