= Croydon Exp07 =

The Logo for the Croydon Exp07 event

The Croydon Exp07 was a series of events held from 2007, aimed at business and residents in the London Borough of Croydon, UK to demonstrate the £2bn of development projects planned for Croydon in the next 10 years. It is part of the Croydon Vision 2020 regeneration programme. The council-backed scheme hoped to interest investors to fund part of the regeneration projects around Croydon, and help to establish Croydon as "London's Third City" Croydon has applied for city status twice but failed. If it had succeeded, the borough would have become the City of Croydon, like the City of Westminster.

The expo took place from the 9th to 12 May in the Whitgift Centre and Centrale Shopping Centre. It was also displayed in the Croydon Clocktower on 17 May.

== Projects ==
The projects included all areas of Croydon that were expected to be redeveloped between 2007 and 2012. These included Purley, where the current swimming pool on the High Street was set to close. This would allow scope for a more comprehensive High Street regeneration scheme that would help to bring new community investment to the district centre. A new "Super Library", which would offer learning and training, was planned to open after the pool closure, as was a new swimming complex in Coulsdon. At the time, the facility was being considered by Croydon Council as part of its contribution to the Olympics.

Exp07 considered another leisure facility being opened in Waddon, and the old New Addington Pool being redeveloped to coincide with the opening of South Norwood Leisure Centre as part of the "new New Addington". The New Addington regeneration was planned for the town centre on Central Parade and would include a brand new Tesco, along with a new larger library and leisure facility. Other new facilities to be provided will be a Joint Services Centre, community centre, changing village, exercise gym and dance studio along with treatment room and a multi-purpose room. Plans covered a new café and a car park, a health centre, kiosk, maisonettes, and 300 residential units.

== Park Place ==
The Expo presented other notable developments such as Park Place Shopping Centre. On 6 March 2007 the Secretary of State confirmed the use of a Compulsory Purchase Order (CPO) to acquire the remaining land for the development. This was a major milestone for the scheme and allowed Minerva and Lend Lease to gain vacant possession, in readiness for the start of demolition and main construction works.

Park Place has been granted detailed planning permission by the London Borough of Croydon. When completed it will provide 900,000 sq ft (84,000 m^{2}) of accommodation, comprising mainly retail space and restaurants. A key component of the retail space is the provision of a new full-range department store. John Lewis has previously confirmed a requirement for 240,000 sq ft (22,000 m^{2}) for Croydon and a regional store of this size can only be accommodated on the Park Place site. Other places with interest include Gap, Habitat and Borders.

Designed by architects RTKL, the scheme will provide both the large retail units and the necessary mall environment needed to establish Croydon as a Top 10 retail destination within the UK, and the largest and most efficient centre within South London.

== Croydon Gateway ==
The second main feature of the Expo, the Croydon Gateway (later Ruskin Square]), proved the most expensive. The cabinet member for finance and regeneration, Councillor Tim Pollard, said in 2007 that:

Over £2 billion worth of redevelopment is already planned over the next ten years. This will have a major cultural and physical impact on the borough and Croydon Expo will be an opportunity to communicate to local businesses and to the public the vision of what can be realised through regeneration. It will also enable us to showcase proposals to developers and financiers on home ground. However, regeneration will form only one part of the Expo. We intend focusing on all aspects of change that are shaping what it will be like to live in Croydon over the next couple of decades.

== See also ==
- Park Place
- Croydon Gateway
- London Borough of Croydon
- Tramlink
