= Saffron Square =

Town square in Croydon, London, England

Coordinates: 51°22′44″N 0°5′55″W

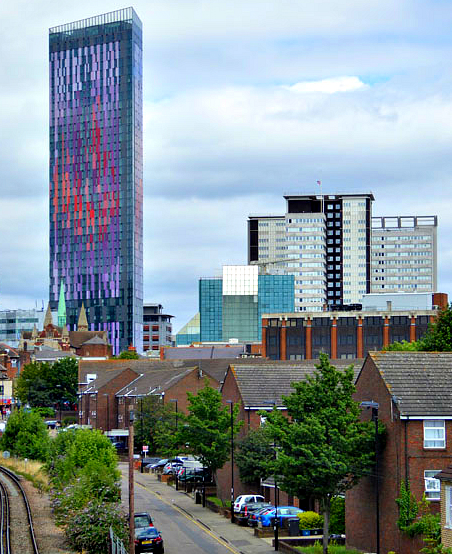
- Saffron Tower after completion in 2016
- Interactive map of the Saffron Square area

General information
- Location: Wellesley Road, Croydon, England
- Construction started: 2011
- Completed: 2016
- Client: Berkeley Homes (South East London) Ltd

Height
- Height: 134 m (440 ft)

Technical details
- Structural system: WSP Group Plc
- Floor count: 43

Design and construction
- Architect: Rolfe Judd
- Structural engineer: Manhire Associates Ltd.

Website
- berkeleygroup.co.uk/new-homes/london/croydon/saffron-square

Saffron Square (formerly known as Wellesley Square) is a town square and a skyscraper in Croydon, South London, England. The purple and red Saffron Tower is currently the second-tallest building in Croydon.

Saffron Square is part of the Croydon Vision 2020 regeneration plan for the London Borough of Croydon to add to its goal of being London's Third City. The area was developed by Berkeley Homes. Planning permission for the tower was given in April 2008, and construction began in 2011, with completion in 2016.

== History ==
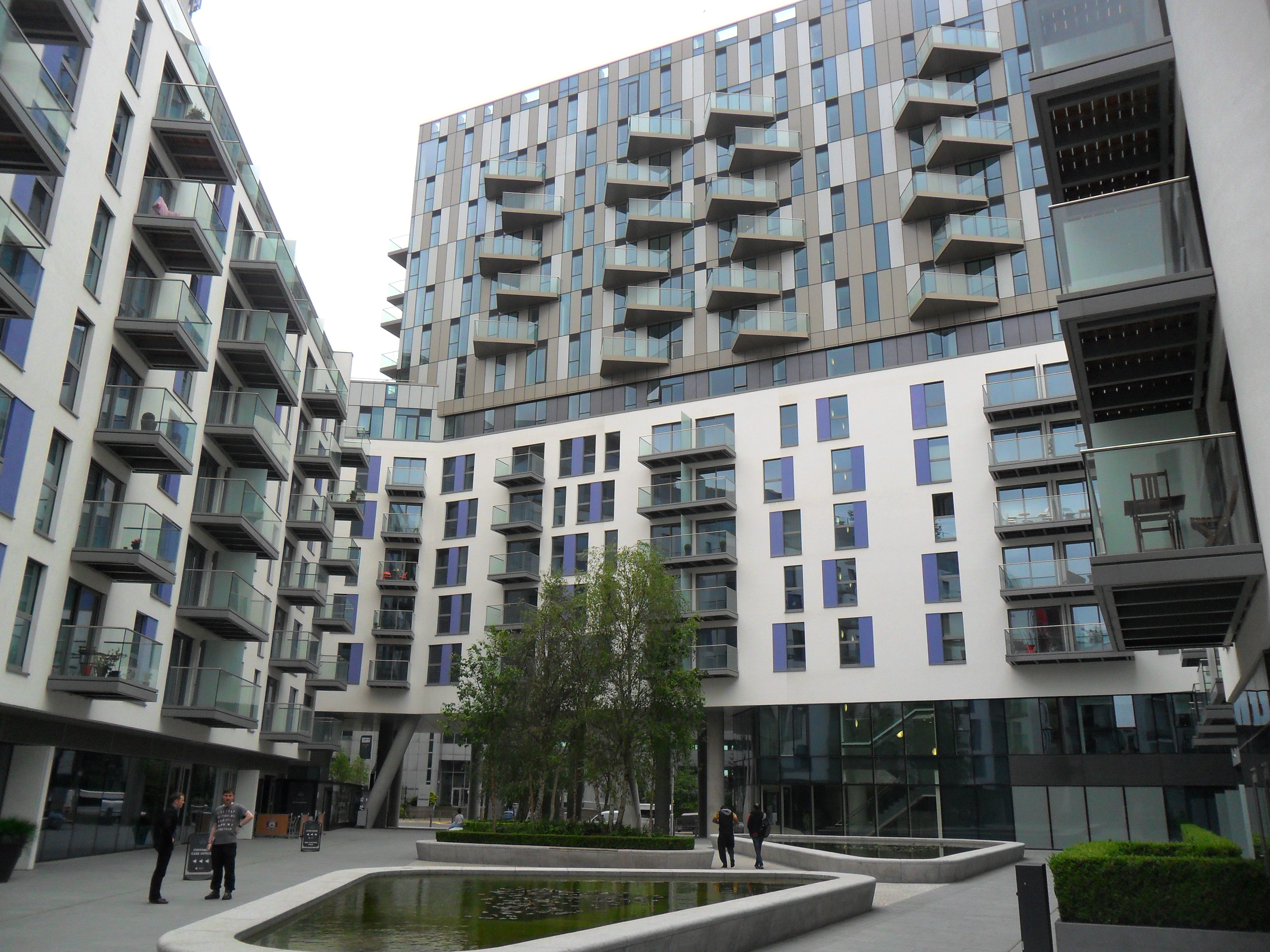
Saffron Square in May 2014

In the mid-2000s, the development of tall buildings was being encouraged in the London Plan, which would lead to the erection of new skyscrapers over the next few years as London went through a high-rise boom.

By 2008, the site, on main Croydon thoroughfare Wellesley Road, had lain fallow for over ten years. The project aimed to start in 2008 with completion in 2012, however, construction started in 2011. By June 2013, the tower's construction was well underway with its final completion expected in 2015. As of early 2014, a large part of the project had been completed. Upon completion, Saffron Square was the tallest residential tower in Croydon, with 414 private apartments and penthouses, overtaken in 2019 by 101 George Street.

Saffron Tower was nominated for the 2016 Carbuncle Cup for the ugliest building of the previous 12 months, but the award went to Lincoln Plaza in Docklands.

== Plans ==
Berkeley Homes' proposals for this key northern gateway site include, but are not limited to:

- A new town square accessible to all and integral to the design. Offering a public environment to the large number of people who work in Croydon.
- A 43-storey tower incorporating a light feature to the Croydon skyline.
- Approximately 800 new homes, a proportion of which will be for affordable/key worker housing. 10% will be for shared ownership housing.
- 3,000 m^{2} of retail floorspace including shops, restaurants and cafés surrounding the public square.
- Sustainable initiatives to minimise the scheme's impact on the environment. A significant proportion of the site's energy requirements will be met by on site renewable energy sources.
- Creation of improved permeability and safeguarding of future pedestrian links between East Croydon and West Croydon stations.

== See also ==
- Croydon Vision 2020
- Croydon Gateway
- Carbuncle Cup
