= Directline holidays =

Travel agency in the United Kingdom

Directline-holidays
- Type: Private (LSE: TCG)
- Industry: Travel
- Founded: 1993
- Defunct: 2013
- Fate: Acquired by Broadway Travel
- Headquarters: Croydon, England, UK
- Key people: Antony Bradley (Director); Matthew Flint (Director)
- Products: Package holidays, All inclusive holidays
- Number of employees: 50(2013)
- Website: directline-holidays.co.uk

Directline-Holidays was a trading name of Holidayline (UK) Ltd until the brand and website was sold to Broadway Travel in September 2013. It specialises in selling cheap package holidays, flights and hotels. As an independent and privately owned UK travel agent, it has been an early adopter and advocate of new media.

== History ==
Launched in 1993, directline holidays was among a handful of holiday companies advertising on television text services. In 2000 its first website directlineholidays.com was launched, advertising with bid-for-position search engine pioneers espotting (now miva) and goto (now Yahoo! Search Marketing).

== Marketing ==
In 2001 the entirety of the company's marketing budget was spent with online bid-for-position companies, including the newly created Google Adwords (which later became Google Ads).

By 2003 the company changed its website address to directline-holidays.co.uk and was already advertising with every major PPC (pay per click) network including Adwords and Overture (now Yahoo! Search Marketing).

directline-holidays.co.uk continued its early adoption of new media through 2006, trialing pay-per-call advertising with Adwords and beta testing Microsoft adCenter in the UK.

Although, well known in the UK online community for many years, geographic targeting has left the company virtually unknown outside of the UK.

== See also ==
- Tours4fun
