= The Island, Croydon =

High-rise residential building in London, England

The Island
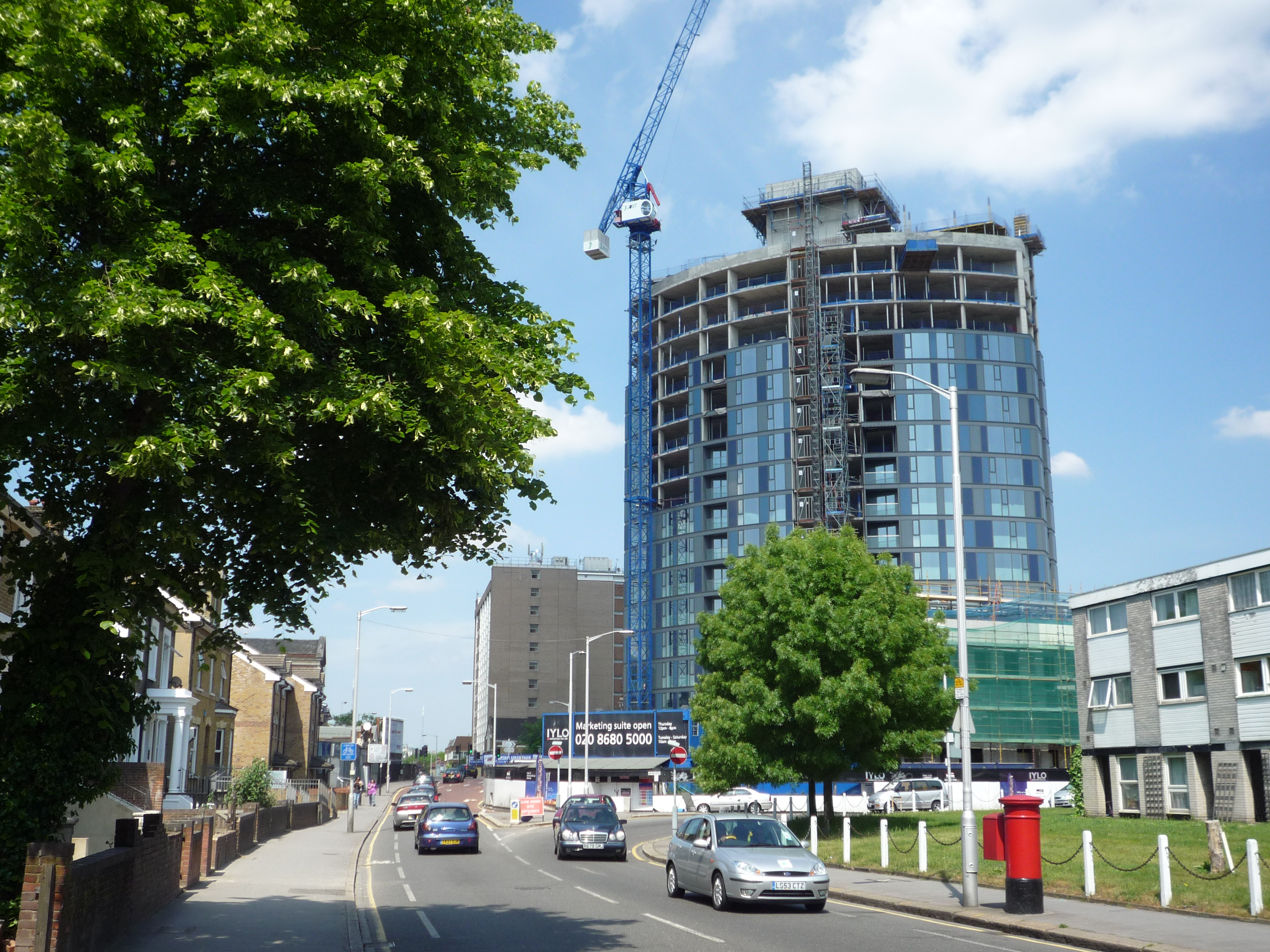
- Under construction in 2010
- Interactive map of the The Island area

General information
- Location: Croydon, London, England
- Coordinates: 51.3823°N 0.0983°W
- Construction started: 2007
- Completed: 2014
- Client: Phoenix Logistics, E3 Property

Height
- Height: 61 m (200 ft)

Technical details
- Floor count: 20

Design and construction
- Architect: Darling Associates
- Structural engineer: Walsh Group and Scott Wilson

Website
- http://www.island-croydon.co.uk

The Island (also known as Newgate Tower, and previously ISLAND and IYLO) is a residential skyscraper in the London Borough of Croydon, London. In 2018, the building's 17th-floor penthouse apartment was described as the "most expensive flat in Croydon".

The building was designed to have 20 floors of apartments and a roof height of 61 metres (200 ft). The tower is elliptical in plan comprising two equal halves which appear to "slide" past one another. The architects of the building are Darling Associates Architecture, with a number of other firms working on the building including Phoenix Logistics, E3 Property International, Lancsville Construction, Jones Lang LaSalle, Matthew Consultants, Macfarlane Wilder, Scott Wilson, Scott Wilson, Cole Jarman Associates and DP9.

The tower is part of the Croydon Vision 2020 regeneration plan for Croydon to add to its goal of being "London's Third City".

== History ==
Construction began in 2007, and halted in 2009 when the projects funding source HBOS went into administration. It restarted in late 2010 but officially stopped in June 2011, following the construction company, St James's Croydon, a subsidiary of developers Phoenix Logistics entering administration. By March 2012 the site was showing increasing signs of vandalism and graffiti and on 22 April 2012 the construction crane was removed from the site. In November 2012, a number of the apartments which had been fitted with the exterior glass still displayed 'Sold' signs (which date back to when the building was still under construction and being marketed), and a number on the lower floors were left with timber or plastic coverings. The lower floors of the building and the hoardings around the site were daubed with graffiti.

Construction was expected to start again in late 2012 but after some delay work finally restarted in June 2013 following the sale of the site to Regency Homes with a £900,000 discount and rename of the site to "Island" with an estimated completion of 2015.

Construction of the building was completed in 2014.

== Transport links ==
The building is located at the northern end of Croydon town centre and is close to transport links in the town. The nearest railway station is West Croydon. There is a bus station at West Croydon. Tramlink services from West Croydon are on the Croydon Loop and go eastbound only towards East Croydon and beyond. The closest tram stop for westbound services is East Croydon station.

== See also ==
- Croydon Gateway
- Croydon Arena
