= Altitude 25 =

Apartment building in Croydon, London, England

Coordinates: 51°22′21″N 0°05′29″W

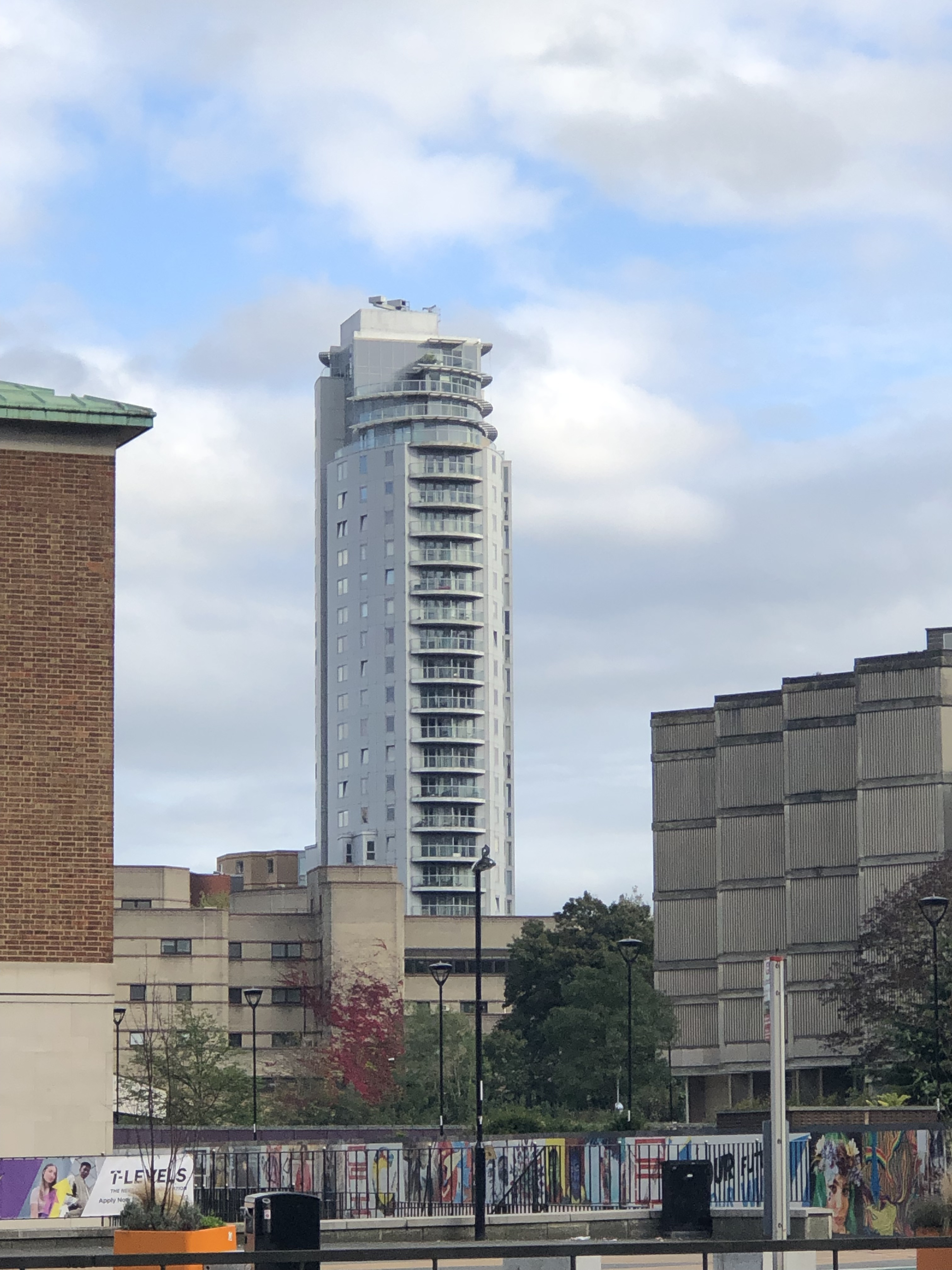
- Altitude 25 in 2021
- Interactive map of the Altitude 25 area

General information
- Location: Croydon, London, England
- Construction started: 2006
- Completed: 2009
- Cost: £57m
- Client: Howard Holdings plc

Design and construction
- Architect: Devereux Architects
- Structural engineer: Haymills (Contractors) Ltd., Walsh Associates Ltd., Vector Design Ltd., Keogh McConnell Spence, Oskomera Façades (UK) Ltd., Doka Industrie GmbH

Altitude 25 is an apartment building on Fairfield Road in the London Borough of Croydon, London. It is Croydon's fourth tallest building. The development was intended to regenerate a brownfield site near to East Croydon station. The building was completed in 2009, and has 26 floors of apartments up to floor 25, hence the name Altitude 25, a roof height of 82.00 and a structural height of 94 m (307 ft). It is part of the Croydon Vision 2020 regeneration project for a new generation of buildings in the town.

The scheme of residential flats comprises 196 apartments with a mix of private and affordable housing. With the support of the town planners, the focus of the design is a 25-storey elliptical tower. This structure is proposed to create a new urban landmark within the centre of Croydon. Devereux were appointed as lead consultant and architect by Howard Holdings plc, having previously designed residential schemes, most recently in Guildford, Surrey for the same client. The scheme is adjacent to a large hotel, Croydon Park Hotel, and there are shared recreational facilities accessible to all residents. It 100 parking spaces for residents of the apartment block.

Park Hill Recreation Ground, a large urban park and ornamental gardens in Croydon, is located opposite the building. The Ashcroft Theatre and Fairfield Halls which provide theatre performances and concerts are both on the same road as Altitude 25.

== See also ==
- No. 1 Croydon
- Nestlé Tower
