= Tours4fun =

Travel Booking Website

- Website type: Travel Website
- Available in: English, Chinese
- Headquarters: San Gabriel，California
- Owner: Trip.com Group
- Founders: Allen Wang, Kevin Du, Richard.Chen
- Website: www.tours4fun.com
- Launched: 2004; 22 years ago

Tours4fun is a Los Angeles-based online travel agency for multi-day tours and travel experiences, connecting travelers with local and international tour operators in more than 150 countries. The company is a subsidiary of Trip.com Group (formerly Ctrip), one of the world's largest online travel agencies. Tours4fun operates multilingual platforms in English, Chinese, and has served over 3.5 million travelers worldwide since its founding in 2004.

== History ==
Tours4fun was founded in May 2004 Los Angeles, California by Allen Wang、Kevin Du and Richard.Chen.The company initially focused on serving Chinese-speaking travelers in North America with local tour packages to destinations in the United States, Canada, and beyond. In 2012, Tours4fun joined the National Tour Association (NTA), further strengthening its industry partnerships and destination resource network.

In December 2013, Chinese travel giant Trip.com Group (then known as Ctrip) invested over $100 million to acquire Tours4fun, forming the basis of its North American expansion strategy. The acquisition provided Tours4fun with enhanced technology capabilities, supply chain resources, and access to Trip.com Group's international market network. In April 2014, Tours4fun expanded its product offerings to include cruise bookings. In 2015, the platform added instant booking capabilities, allowing customers to confirm and book travel services in real time.

In 2023, Tours4fun joined the United States Online Travel Association (USOTA), further expanding its industry collaboration network. In 2025, Tours4fun was fully integrated into the Trip.com Group global ecosystem, becoming a key component of the group's overseas guided tour and global destination tourism supply chain. In June 2026, the company opened its first brick-and-mortar store in San Gabriel Valley, Los Angeles, marking its entry into online-to-offline (O2O) integrated service.

== Business model and products ==
Tours4fun operates as a travel marketplace, partnering with over 1,000 destination management companies (DMCs) and tour operators worldwide. The platform offers more than 15,000 travel products covering over 150 countries and regions, including:

- Multi-day guided tours
- Small group tours
- Private and customized tours
- China inbound tours
- National park tours (including Yellowstone, Grand Canyon, and Alaska)
- European circuit tours
- Cruises and specialty experiences
- Attraction tickets and day trips

The company's core markets include the western United States, Yellowstone National Park, the Canadian Rockies, the eastern United States, Alaska, Europe, Australia, New Zealand, and Africa.

== Technology and services ==
Tours4fun operates web platforms, mobile applications, and WeChat mini-programs. The company provides 24/7 multilingual customer service in English, Chinese, with operations and call centers in Los Angeles, Chengdu (China).

== Corporate affairs ==
Tours4fun is headquartered in San Gabriel, California, with additional offices in Chengdu, China. The company holds a California Seller of Travel registration (CST# 2096846-50) and a Chinese travel agency business license (L-SC-CJ00070).

== Awards and recognition ==
- 2012: the National Tour Association (NTA) member
- 2016: Chicago Tourism Bureau global strategic partner
- 2017: California Travel Commission global strategic partner
- 2018: 12th China Brand Festival Golden Spectrum Award
- 2018: E-Commerce Top 100 Brands of the Decade
- 2023：Became a member of USTOA

== Pack for a Purpose ==
In December 2015, the company partnered with the non-profit organization Pack for a Purpose to promote ethical and responsible travel and inform travelers of charity foundations near their destinations.
