= Wettern House =

Former office block in Croydon, London, England

- Interactive map of the Wettern House area

General information
- Location: East Croydon, London, England
- Coordinates: 51.3758°N 0.0945°W
- Construction started: 1963
- Demolished: November 2005
- Client: Croydon Corporation

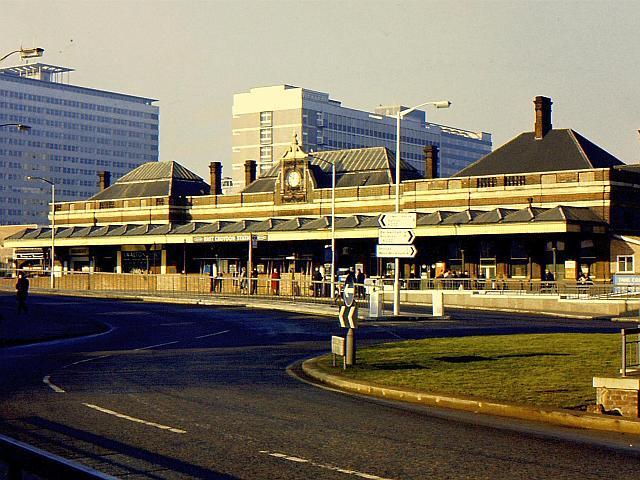
East Croydon station in 1967, with Wettern House behind

Wettern House was a high rise building next to East Croydon station in Croydon. Originally built in 1963, two years before the County Borough of Croydon disbanded into the London Borough of Croydon, it was demolished in November 2005 to make way for what would become Ruskin Square. The developer Stanhope, funded by Schroders, paid approximately £4 million to Prudential to acquire the building.

== Demolition ==
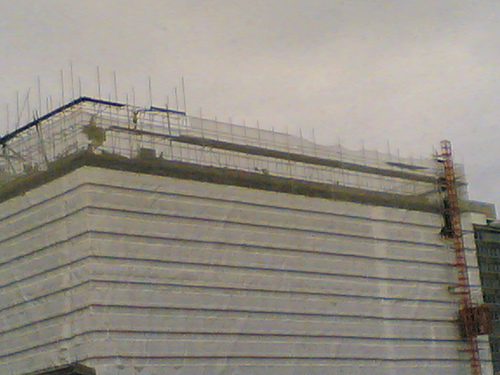
Wettern House during demolition

Before demolition, the building had 12 floors and a structural height of 38 metres (125 ft). Its demolition was part of the Croydon Vision 2020 regeneration planning for a new generation of buildings.

Throughout September to November 2005, Wettern House was the last office block located on the site to be slowly demolished under a protective wrapper to protect the rail infrastructure and surrounding buildings. The demolition cost approximately £1 million, or £1.8 million in 2025.

Between February and April 2006, the site was cleared of all occupiers (car parks and car rental, etc.) with the exception of the Warehouse Theatre, with new hoardings now marking the boundaries of the main site. Stanhope and Schroders now own large parcels of land to the north of the main site as well as office blocks in Croydon's central business district.

July and August 2007 saw the company Mace appointed as site managers by Stanhope. Further clearance works (enabling works) then occurred, with final designs of all buildings being worked up by Foster + partners prior to foundations being dug in the autumn.

During September 2007, a new branding for the development took shape and all hoardings were brought up to standard ready for the commencement of works. Meanwhile, Croydon Council was under significant pressure to agree the final 'technical' planning conditions (such as the lighting scheme, drainage etc.) to enable the Stanhope Scheme to commence its construction phase. On 12 September 2007, Stanhope announced that the scheme would be renamed Ruskin Square.

In October 2007, Croydon council continued to sit on the release of the final planning obligations on the Ruskin Square development. It is not known if the delay was connected to the public inquiry or the Arrowcroft issue.

On 2 June 2006, Stanhope and Schroders were granted formal planning permission for their proposed Gateway scheme. Ruth Kelly, Secretary of State for Communities and Local Government endorsed the report of the local planning inspector and granted permission.

By 2015, redevelopment of the site into Ruskin Square had begun.
