= Croydon Central Library =

Library in Croydon, London, England

Coordinates: 51.3721°N 0.0997°W

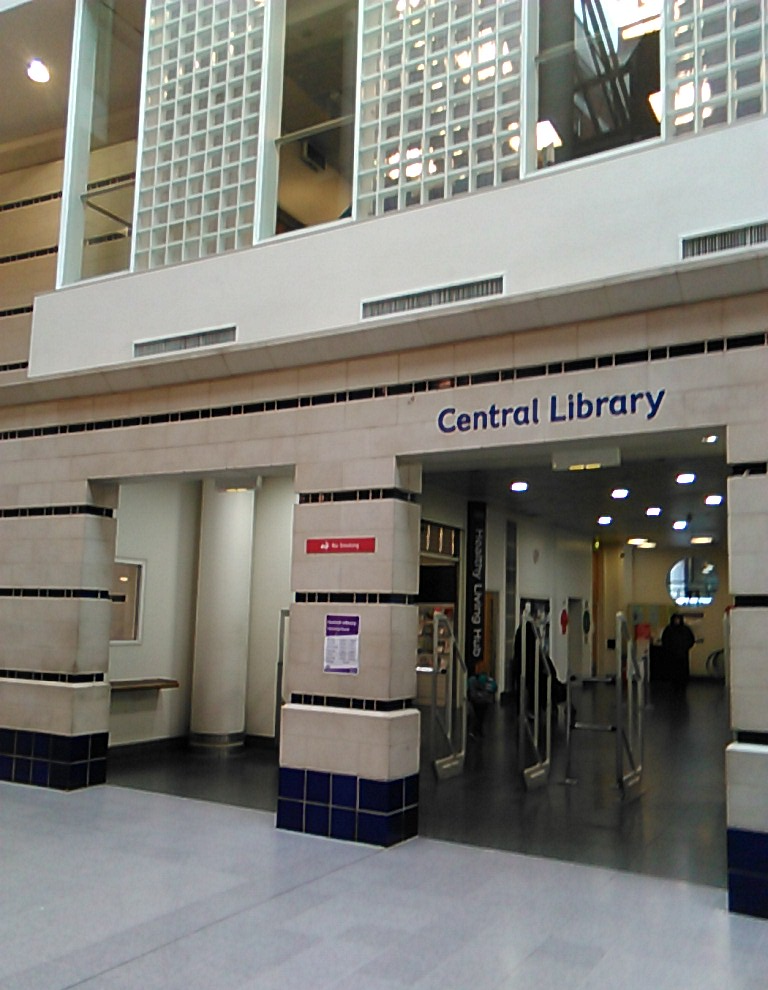
- Interactive map of the Croydon Central Library area

General information
- Location: Croydon, London, England
- Client: London Borough of Croydon

Croydon Central Library is Croydon's main public library, located inside the Croydon Clocktower in Croydon, south London. It is owned by the London Borough of Croydon on behalf of Croydon Council. The library is located on four floors inside the building. There are also children's rhymetime sessions.

Croydon's first central library was at 100-106 North End. The library moved to the Croydon Clocktower buildings when they first opened in May 1896, the library was located in a central wooden panelled room (later used as a local studies library and now used as the David Lean Cinema), it was then notable opening with a large collection of over 100,000 volumes and for being one of the first public libraries at the time with open access shelves.

An extension was built to the Clocktower municipal buildings in the early 1990s with a new four floor library space opening in November 1993.

One notable chief librarian W. C. Berwick Sayers was instrumental in advancements in library classification and children's librarianship.

It was the third-most-used public library in the UK in 2010.

Croydon Libraries is part of The Library Consortium (TLC) shared catalogue.

The Rainbow Reading Group (run in conjunction with the Croydon Area Gay Society (CAGS) meets at the library monthly. The group reads LGBTQI+ books and has been running since 2011.
