= No. 1 Croydon =

Tall building in Croydon, London

Coordinates: 51.3749°N 0.0910°W

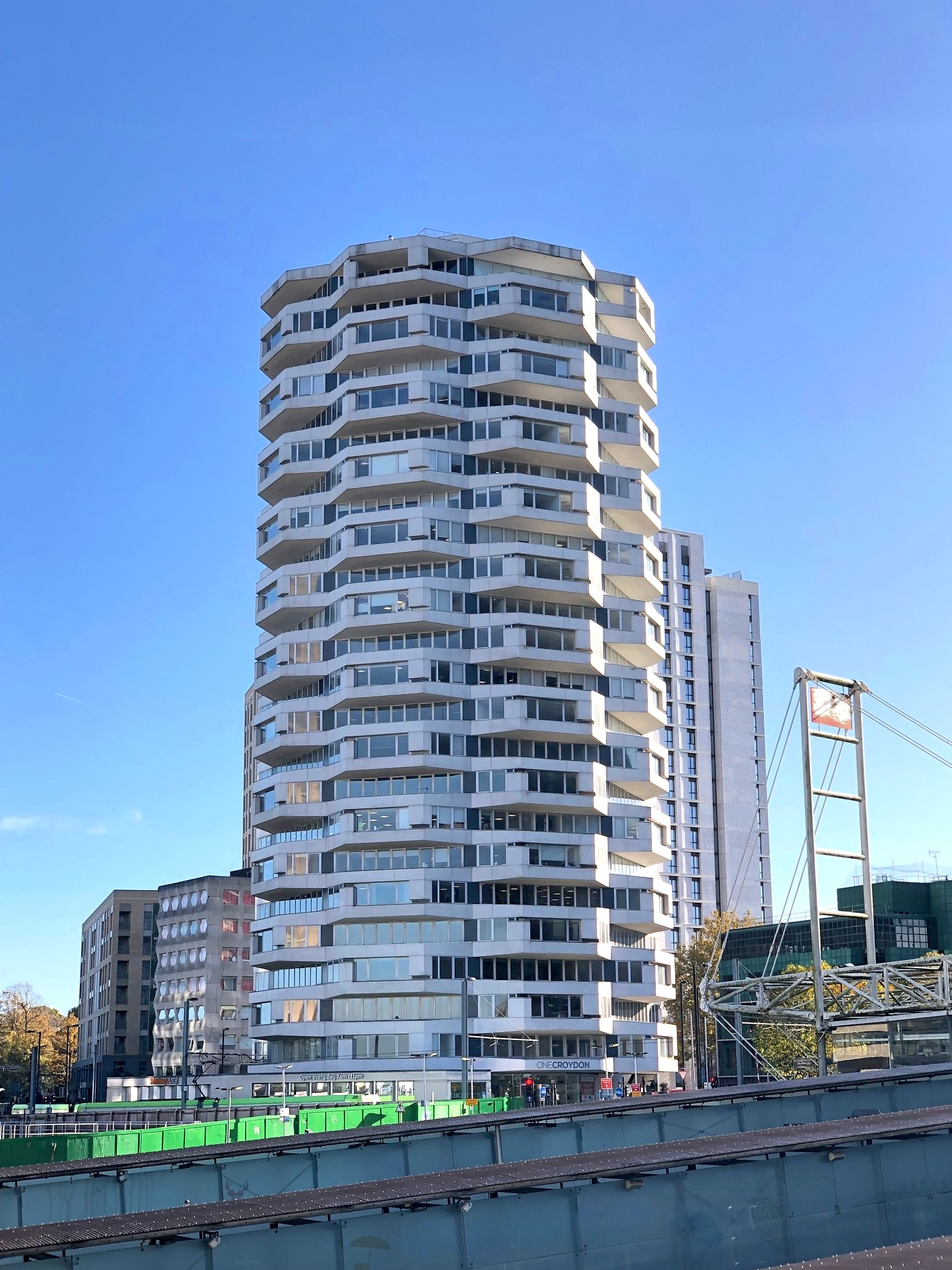
- No. 1 Croydon looking east
- Former names: NLA Tower

General information
- Location: 12-16 Addiscombe Road, East Croydon, Greater London, England
- Completed: 1970

Design and construction
- Architect: Richard Seifert & Partners
- Structural engineer: Triton

No. 1 Croydon (formerly the NLA Tower, and colloquially the 50p Building, the Weddingcake or the Threepenny bit building) is a tall building at 12–16 Addiscombe Road, Croydon, Greater London, next to East Croydon station. It was designed by Richard Seifert & Partners and completed in 1970. It has 24 storeys and is 269 feet (82 m) high. NLA stood for Noble Lowndes Annuities, the original principal tenant (subsequently taken over by the Hill Samuel Group). It was one of many new buildings constructed in the growing town of Croydon in the 1960s. The development of tall buildings was later encouraged in the 2004 London Plan, which led to the erection of new skyscrapers as Greater London went through a high-rise boom.

== Construction ==
The building was erected between 1968 and 1970. Its distinctive appearance arises from its octagonal floor plans (not, in fact, regular octagons, but squares with splayed or truncated corners), set above one another on alternating orientations.

Construction was delayed by the objections of Miss Kathleen Harding, a solicitor and leasehold tenant of the Victorian East Bridge House, which stood on part of the intended site. She refused to leave, and the new tower had to be erected with East Bridge House still standing. The house was eventually demolished in 1973.

== Restoration project ==
A refurbishment programme costing over £3.5 million was completed in early 2007. It included a six-month exterior cleaning project, a new lobby, landscaping and common areas, and refurbishment of the top ten floors to provide 74,543 square feet (6,925 m^{2}) of high spec, air-conditioned office accommodation.

A substantial amount of work had already been done to improve the façade of the tower. It was identified in a Channel 4 programme as one of the UK's top eyesores. A spokesman for building restoration firm Triton said: "Work is running to schedule and within budget."

== Occupiers ==
No. 1 Croydon is occupied by a number of companies and organisations, including Atkins, Directline holidays and dotdigital.

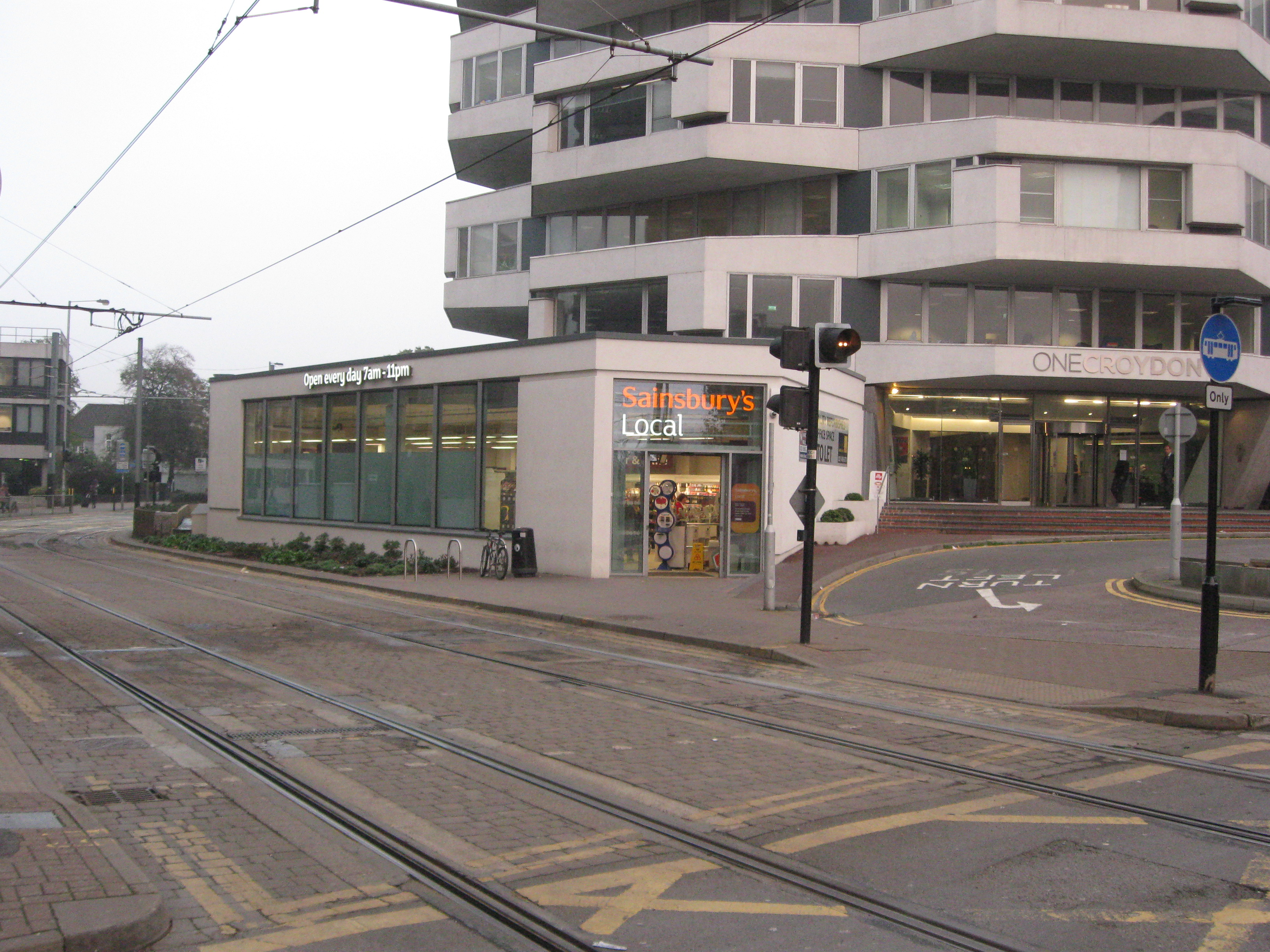
The Sainsbury's extension to the building

In 2014, a branch of Sainsbury's Local was opened in part of the former courtyard on the north side of the building, effectively forming a part of the structure. The new building attracted criticism on aesthetic grounds and also in respect of safety due to its proximity to the Tramlink track bed.

== Other names ==
No. 1 Croydon was originally known colloquially as the Threepenny Bit Building, due to its resemblance to a number of threepence coins stacked on top of each other. After the coins stopped being used following decimalisation the building eventually gained the alternative nickname the 50p Building, as it also resembles a stack of the now more familiar 50p pieces; and it is also referred to as The Wedding Cake. The resemblance to threepenny and 50p coins is approximate, as the building's floors are octagonal (8 sides) whereas threepenny coins were dodecagonal (12 sides) and 50p coins are heptagonal (7 sides).

== In popular culture ==
The building was used as part of an establishing shot in Croydon in the opening credits of the 1980s British sitcom Terry and June. It also appeared in the Black Mirror interactive film Bandersnatch, as housing the offices of fictional game software developer Tuckersoft.

== Applications for listing ==
The campaign for heritage listing No. 1 Croydon is supported by the Twentieth Century Society, but this was turned down by English Heritage in 2013. Following the announcement of a proposal to convert the building into flats, a second application for listing was made in August 2024, but this was also rejected in March 2025.

== See also ==
- East Croydon station
