= Croydon Clocktower =

Arts and museum complex in Croydon, London, England

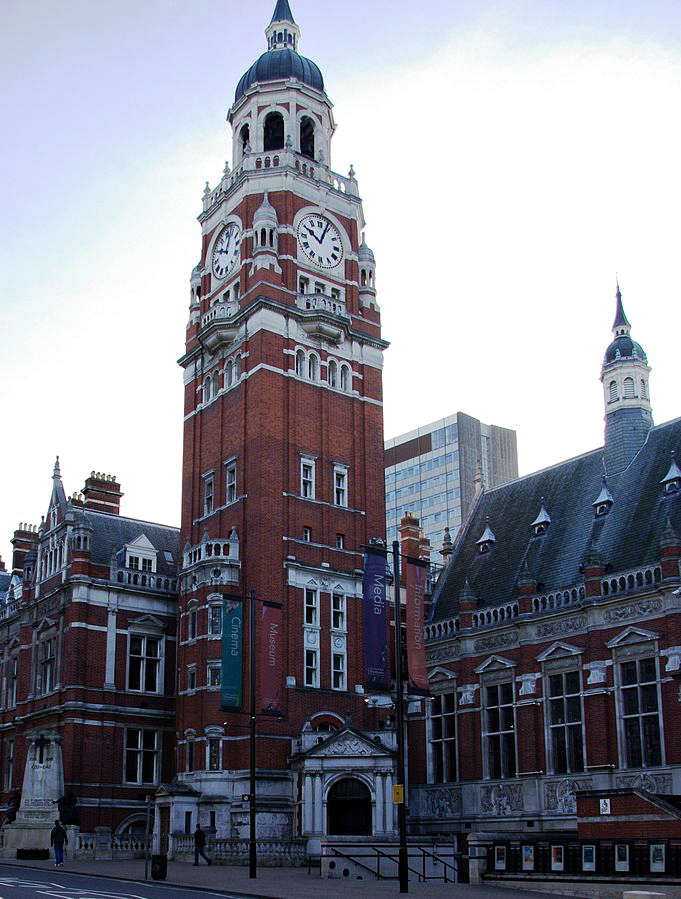
- Croydon Clocktower (the building to the right is the Braithwaite Hall)

- Location within Greater London

General information
- Location: Croydon, London, England
- Coordinates: 51°22′20″N 0°5′59″W
- Client: London Borough of Croydon

Croydon Clocktower is an arts and museum complex located on Katharine Street in Croydon, London.

== History ==
The venue, which forms part of the 19th-century Town Hall, was opened as an arts and museum complex by Queen Elizabeth II in 1994. A notable early success was the Picasso exhibition in March to May 1995 named Picasso's Croydon Period.

The venue contains the Museum of Croydon, Clocktower Café and the Croydon Central Library. Other facilities which can be accessed from Croydon Clocktower include the David Lean Cinema, which offers a regular programme of art house and independent films, and the Braithwaite Hall, which is used for concerts, theatre and children's shows.
