= Ruskin Square =

Square in Croydon, London, England

Coordinates: 51.3760°N 0.0941°W

An artist's impression of the Croydon Tower Ruskin Square skyscraper

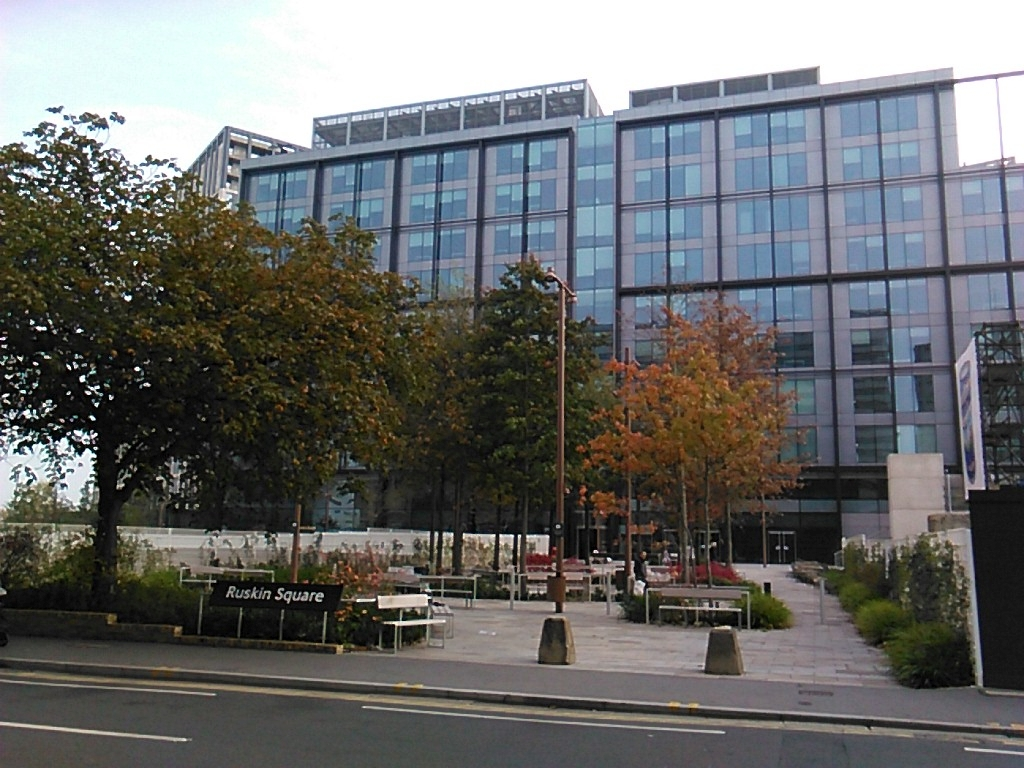
An area of the Ruskin Square development, in 2017

Ruskin Square (or Croydon Gateway) is a project to redevelop a parcel of land between East Croydon railway station and the existing town centre of Croydon in South London. It is part of the major Croydon Vision 2020 regeneration scheme. It has been subject to substantial public debate which has featured in the national media.

Croydon is the principal office district in South London, having been rebuilt on a large scale in the 1960s, but much of the remaining office stock from that era is now dated. The "Croydon Gateway" site, a former railway goods yard, represents the largest single development opportunity in the district.

== Plans ==
=== Arrowcroft ===
An artist's impression of the failed Croydon Arena in the arrowcroft scheme

The London Borough of Croydon actively supported an alternative proposal, developed in partnership with property company Arrowcroft, which would involve the construction of a 12,500-seat indoor arena, named the Croydon Arena, as well as 59,234 m² of offices and 874 homes-including affordable housing. Unlike the Stanhope scheme, this proposal received the full backing from Croydon Council, then went to a public inquiry after being 'called in' by the Secretary of State for Communities and Local Government. It also required compulsory purchase of the site. The Council made a Compulsory Purchase Order to assemble the land required and the objections to which were considered at the same public inquiry. The public inquiry took place between September and November 2007. The Secretary of State rejected the CPO and Planning Permission in July 2008.

=== Croydon Arena ===
Croydon Arena was a proposed arena part of the Croydon Gateway re-generation scheme in the south London district of Croydon. The site is next to East Croydon station and has been in the ownership of the rival development Ruskin Square.

The Arena scheme was backed by Croydon Council with developer partner Arrowcroft. The matter was the subject of a public inquiry that took place from September to November 2007.

The full decision rejecting the Planning Application and the Compulsory Purchase Order was issued on 31 July 2008 and 6 August 2008.

=== The Stanhope Schroders Scheme ===
The site owner's plan has been prepared by the developer, Stanhope, and their financial backers, Schroders; the scheme includes 560 homes with 50% affordable housing, office buildings, a replacement Warehouse Theatre and an urban park. There would be a landmark 29-storey skyscraper which would front on to George Street, next to East Croydon Station.

Norman Foster's firm are the principal architects of the scheme.

== Site progress ==
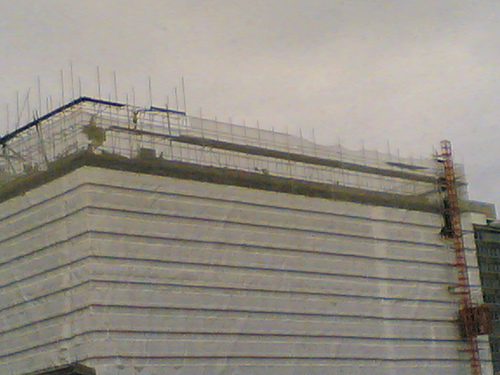
Wettern House demolition

Throughout September to November 2005, the last office block located on the site, Wettern House, was slowly demolished under a protective wrapper to protect the rail infrastructure and surrounding buildings.

Between February and April 2006, the site was cleared of all occupiers (car parks and car rental, etc.) with the exception of the Warehouse Theatre, with new hoardings now marking the boundaries of the main site. Stanhope Schroders now own large parcels of land to the north of the main site as well as office blocks in Croydon's central business district.

July and August 2007 saw the company Mace appointed as site managers by Stanhope. Further clearance works (enabling works) are now underway. Final designs of all buildings are being worked up by Foster + partners prior to foundations being dug this Autumn.

During September 2007, a new branding for the development took shape and all hoardings were brought up to standard ready for the commencement of works. Meanwhile, Croydon Council was under significant pressure to agree the final 'technical' planning conditions (such as the lighting scheme, drainage etc.) to enable the Stanhope Scheme to commence its construction phase. On 12 September 2007, Stanhope announced that the scheme would be renamed Ruskin Square.

In October 2007, Croydon council continued to sit on the release of the final planning obligations on the Ruskin Square development. It is not known if the delay was connected to the public inquiry / Arrowcroft.

On 2 June 2006, Stanhope and Schroders were granted formal planning permission for their proposed Gateway scheme. Ms Ruth Kelly, Secretary of State for Communities and Local Government endorsed the report of the local planning inspector and granted permission. The planning inspector Keith Durrant said of the scheme:

The appeal scheme can, I conclude, be a landmark development of world class quality and function. In doing so, it can significantly further the objectives of national, strategic and local planning policies that seek to regenerate urban land, and provide a well designed and sustainable mix of land uses that can serve both the commercial and community needs of Croydon. There are no cogent arguments against granting planning permission.

The new Conservative administration which took over in Croydon in May 2006 endorsed competing Arrowcroft project, which enabled the Compulsory Purchase Order by which the Council planned to acquire the site to enable its development with Arrowcroft to proceed, to be made in January 2007. The CPO was dealt with separately from the issue of compensation, which will assess the compensation value of the site to be paid, potentially in proceedings in the Lands Tribunal if the order is confirmed. The gap in value is currently around £50Million. Arrowcroft assumed a purchase price of £25Million and Stanhope nearer £80Million as a selling price. Nevertheless, assumptions had to be made about the value of the site, and this was based on the value for development since Stanhope have secured permission. Looking at the Croydon property market, this is the largest piece of land in a single ownership in Croydon. Recent sales suggested a land value higher than the Arrowcroft estimate.

== Construction ==
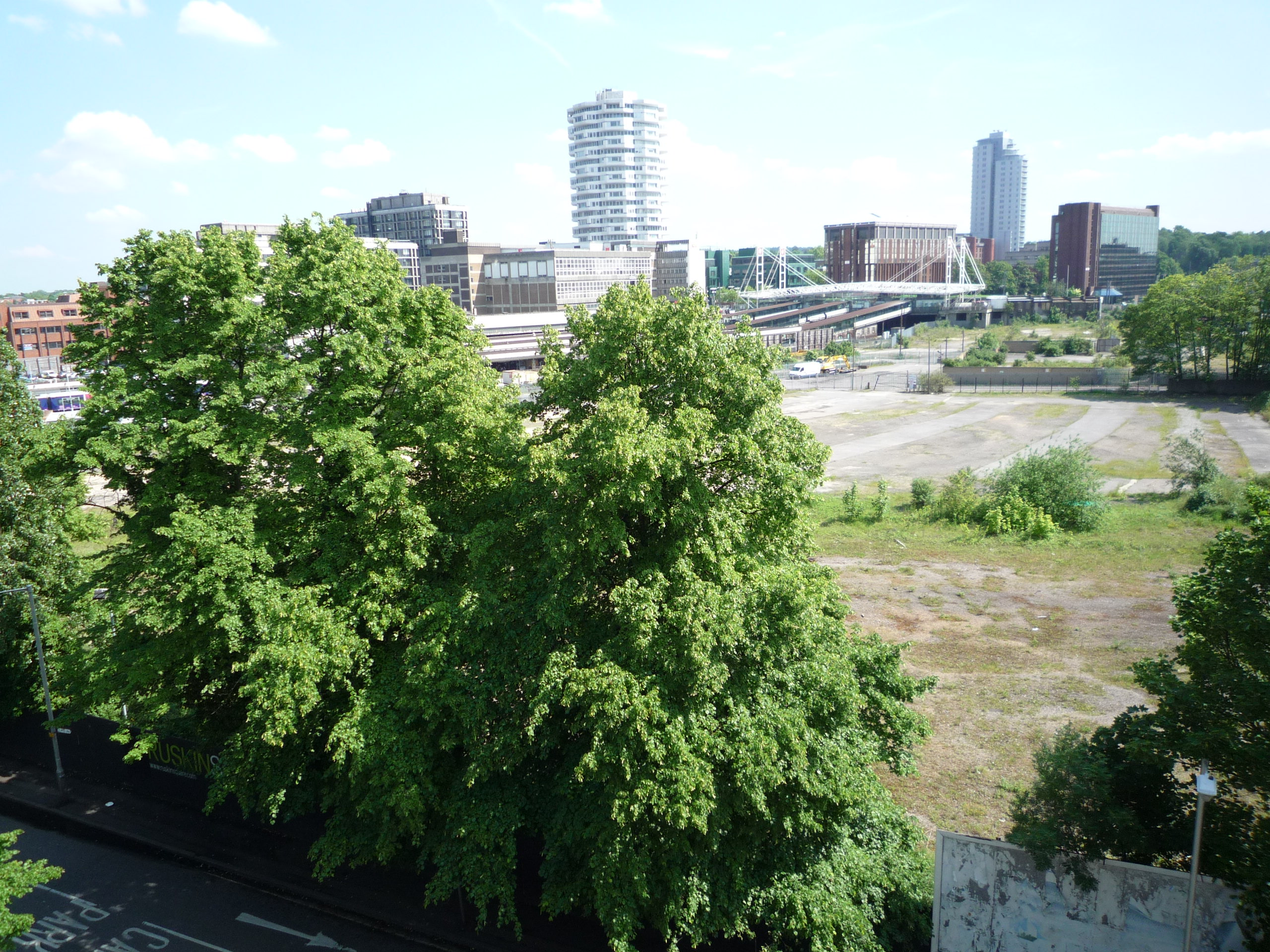
The site of the planned Ruskin Square development - 2010

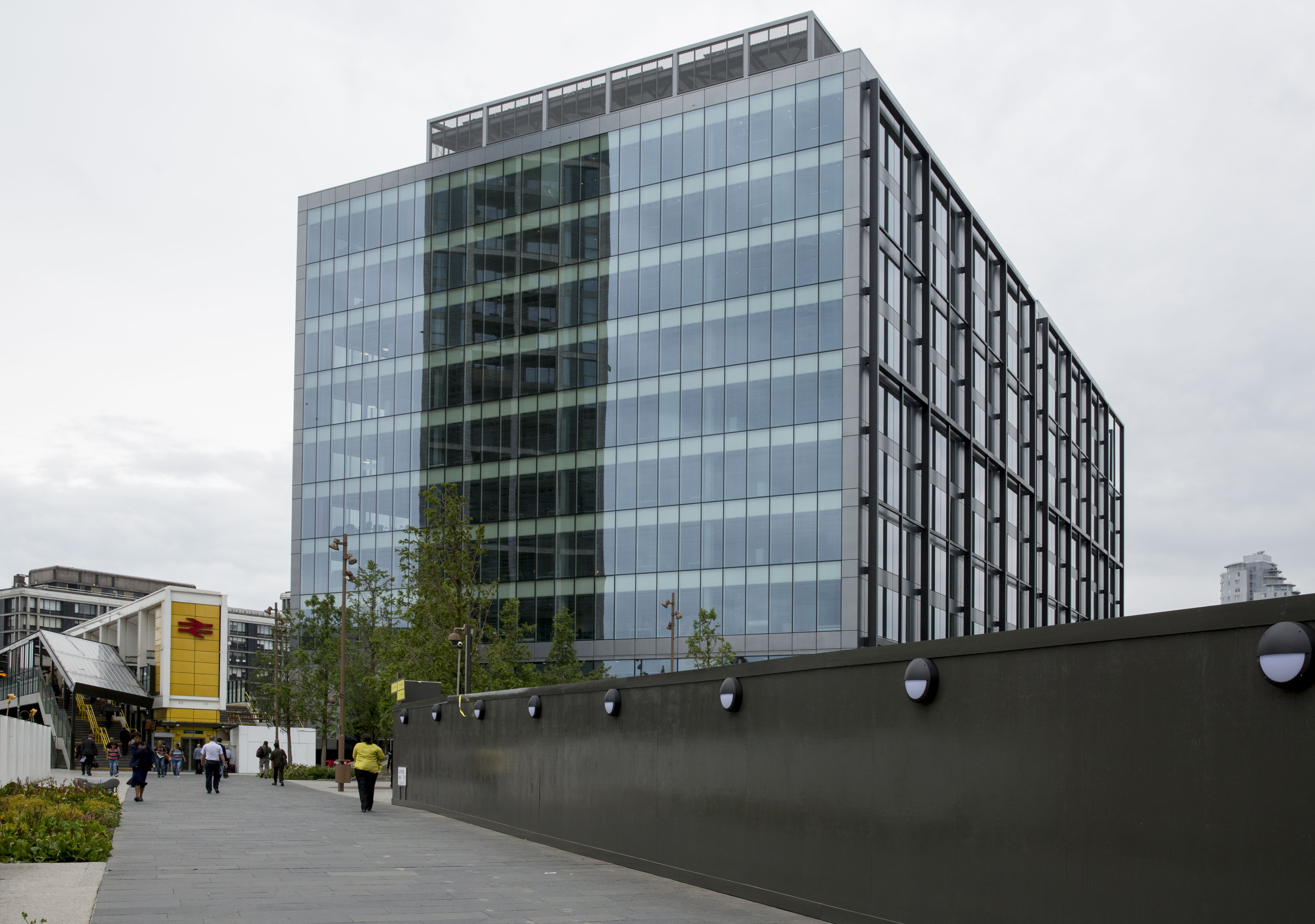
Building 1, in 2017

- October 2008 – January 2009. Stanhope reviewed their scheme to bring it up to date for current market requirements. Once this stage was completed, work was expected on site for phase 1 including the park, an office block, housing and the new Warehouse Theatre.
- March 2011. Workers start phase 1.
- October 2013. Workers demolish the Old Warehouse Theatre building. Work on the Western link from Lansdowne Rd to East Croydon Station is well underway along with the new roundabout.
- November 2014. Work starts on the 22 storey apartment building.
- March 2015. Work starts on Boxpark Croydon
- August 2016. Work completed on the 22 storey apartment building. Taken over by RMG and named Vita.
- October 2016. Boxpark Croydon completed, expected to remain until 2021.
- December 2016. Work completed on Building 1, which has been rented by HM Revenue and Customs. Internal development is underway.
- December 2016. Renovation works of the Dingwall Road Carpark completed. Opens 30 December under the new name of Ruskin Square Carpark.
- January 2017. Work on the social external area outside of Building 1 completed.
