= Timeline of the 2011 England riots =

2011 England riots
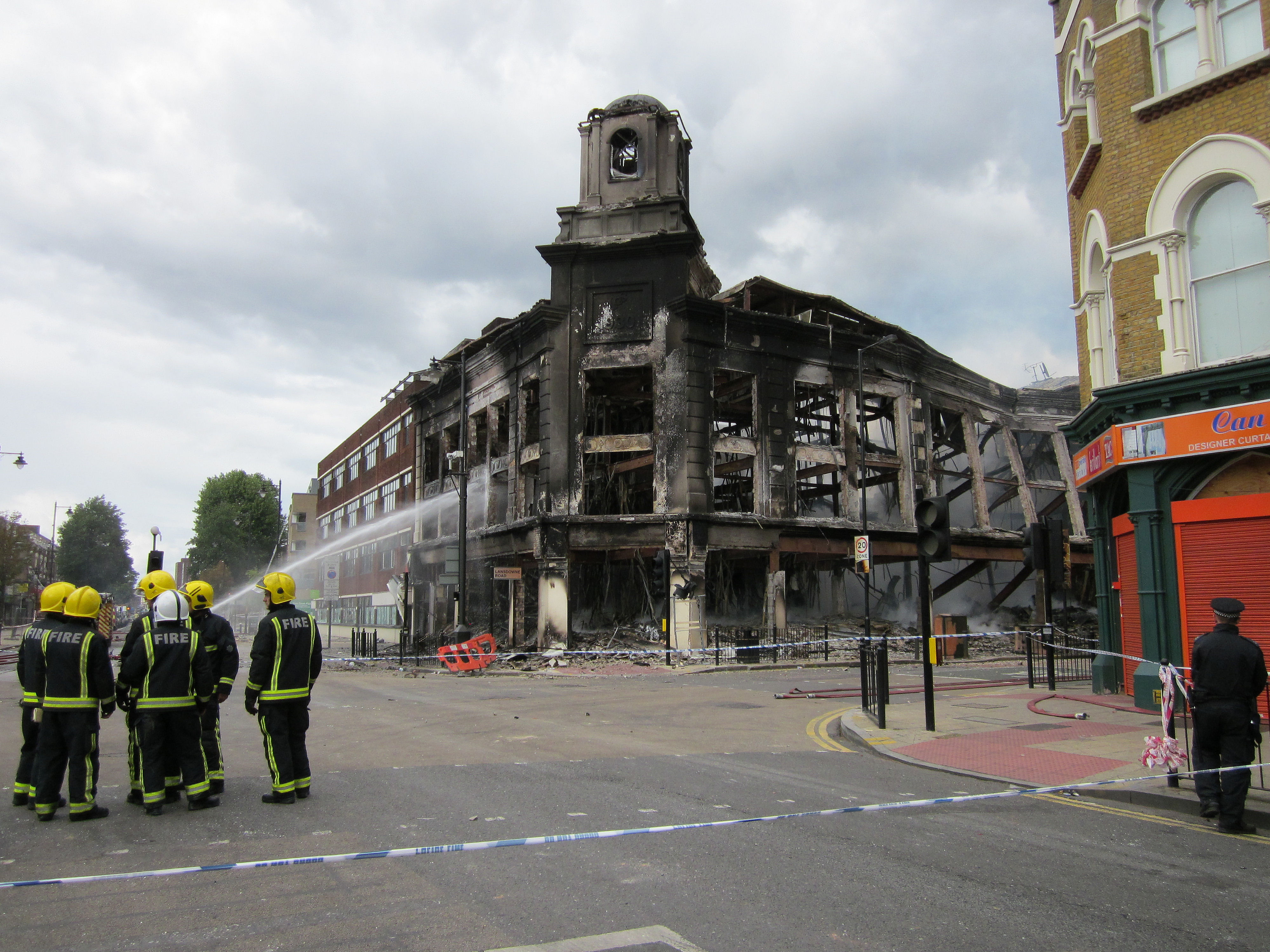
- Firefighters douse a shop and flats destroyed by arson during the initial rioting in Tottenham, North London
- Date: 10 August 2011
- Location: Several districts across Greater London, Greater Manchester, Merseyside, West Midlands, East Midlands, West Yorkshire, Bristol and several other areas.
- Methods: Looting, arson

Casualties and losses
- 5 deaths 16+ civilian injuries 186 police injuries

In early August 2011, England was struck by riots, the worst in the country in decades. The timeline of the events of the riots spanned from 6–10 August.

== Saturday, 6 August ==
=== Protest march ===
On 6 August, an initially peaceful protest was held, beginning at Broadwater Farm and finishing at Tottenham police station. The protest was organised by friends and relatives of Mark Duggan (who was killed by police on 4 August 2011), to assert a perceived unmet need for justice for the family. The rioting occurred shortly after about 120 people marched from Broadwater Farm to Tottenham Police Station via the High Road. The group demanded that a senior local police officer speak to them. They stayed in front of the police station hours longer than originally planned because they were not satisfied with the seniority of the officers available at the time. A younger and more aggressive crowd arrived around dusk, some of whom were armed. Violence broke out following a rumour that police had attacked a 16-year-old girl.

=== Tottenham ===
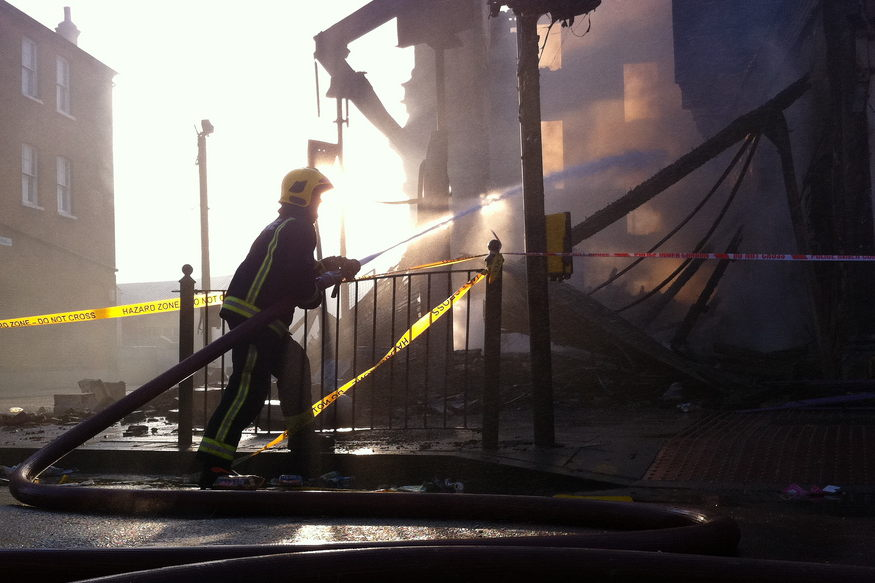
A firefighter douses a blaze in Tottenham during the aftermath of the initial riot

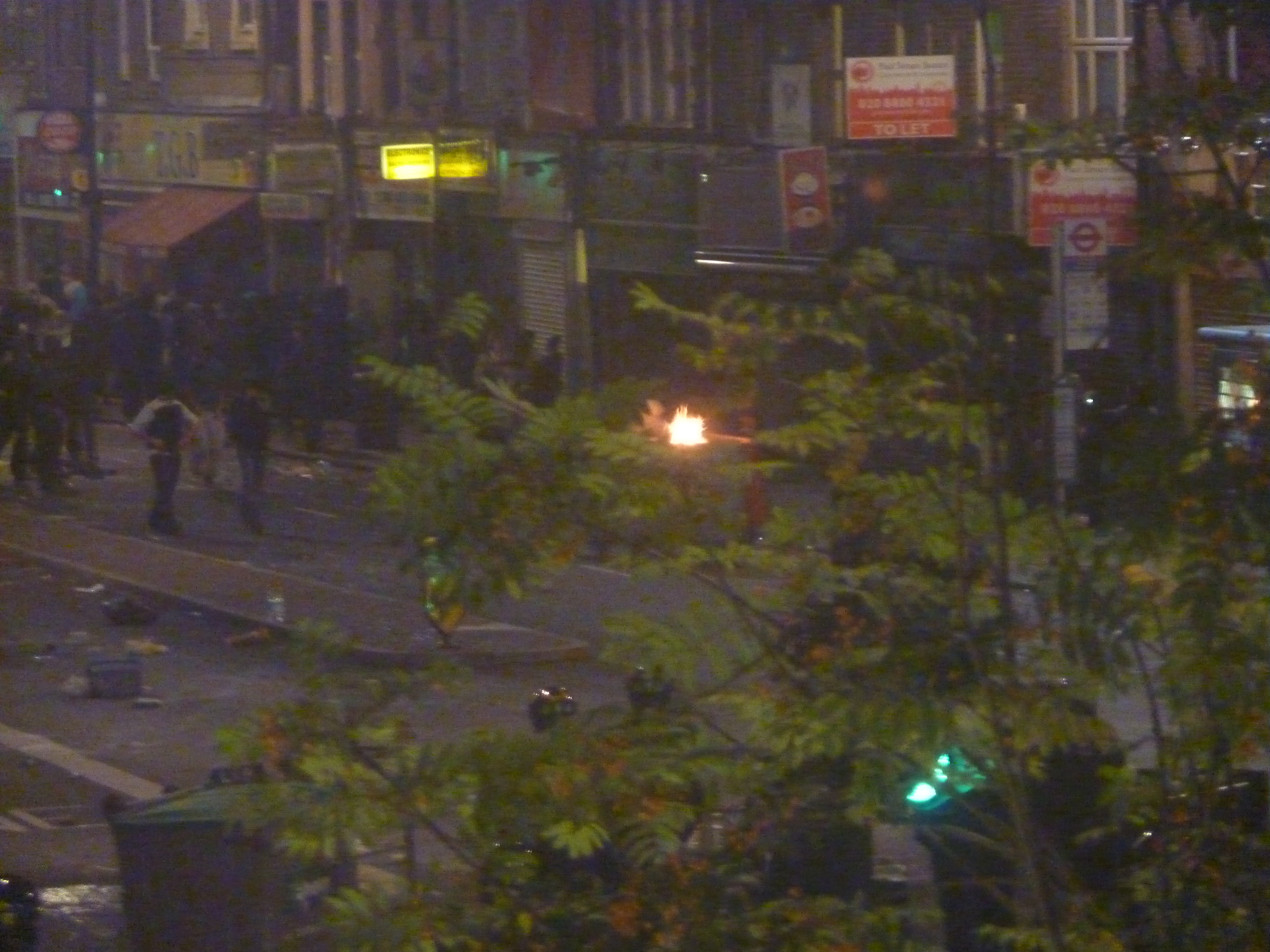
Rioters facing police on the evening of 6 August 2011

A series of disturbances by people in Tottenham followed the protest march on 6 August. The rioting occurred shortly after about 120 people marched from Broadwater to Tottenham Police Station via the High Road. Tottenham is in the London borough of Haringey, which has the fourth highest level of child poverty in London and 8.8% unemployment.

At 22:15, a gang of youths burned down Tottenham's post office. From around 22:30, attacks were carried out on police cars, a double-decker bus and local businesses and homes. Police vans and officers from the Territorial Support Group attended the disorder on Tottenham High Road. Shops windows were smashed and the shops looted by rioters. Fireworks, petrol bombs and other missiles were thrown at police. Twenty-six officers were injured, including one who sustained head injuries. Firefighters experienced difficulty reaching a burning building because of the disorder.

A BBC News correspondent said his news crew and vehicle came under attack from youths throwing missiles. Some news crews left the scene due to the threat of violence. The police set up a cordon around Tottenham police station and a nearby group of BBC and Sky journalists. Some of the police were on horseback.

=== Tottenham Hale ===
The violent clashes were followed by the looting of Tottenham Hale retail park, which continued until dawn without police intervention.

=== Injuries and arrests ===
London Ambulance Service confirmed that ten people had been treated for injuries and that nine were in hospital.

== Sunday, 7 August ==
Location of incidents on 6 and 7 August: Red = 6 August, Yellow = 7 August

=== London incidents ===
==== Enfield and Ponders End ====
On Sunday evening, 7 August, violent disturbances erupted in Enfield, to the north of Tottenham, among a heavy presence of riot police.

Enfield Town centre, Enfield Town Park and alleyways between there and the Palace Garden shopping centre were guarded by police. A heavy police presence was seen outside Enfield Town railway station where people arriving were being searched for security reasons.

Riot police arrived in Enfield Town the afternoon of 7 August as several small groups of hooded youngsters arrived in cars, buses and trains. Around 100 people were waiting in small groups in the vicinity of Enfield Town station in Southbury Road.

Disorder ensued around 5:30 when a police car in Church Street was pelted with bricks. Shops were attacked, including HMV's branch in Church Street. A police helicopter hovered over the area.

At around 19:00, police pushed a group of around thirty youths back onto Southbury Road towards the junction with Great Cambridge Road. Police dogs were deployed at the scene. Similar action drove back approximately 50 people along Southbury Road via Queens Street, after a preceding clash with rioters outside a supermarket.

At 19:30, both Metropolitan Police officers and reinforcements from Kent Police cordoned off Enfield, making a "sterile area" to deal with local disturbances, including robberies at Enfield Retail Park.

The scenes of Enfield were "reminiscent of Tottenham, though smaller."

==== Brixton ====
Looting spread to Brixton that evening. Six fire engines fought a blaze at a Foot Locker shoe shop in Brixton. Riot police and youths clashed near a local Currys store that was broken into during the disturbances. Speaking to The Daily Telegraph, a local resident described "hundreds" of men and women entering the electrical shop and emerging with TVs and other electrical goods. When police arrived, the looters attacked, throwing rocks and the contents of rubbish bins at officers. A branch of Halfords was targeted and looted by youths.

One Brixton resident said: "People were coming to Brixton from outside the area. I was getting out of Brixton Tube last night about 22:30 and going up the escalator when about 10 teenagers ran up the escalator and pushed me to one side." By 11:57, both Tesco and Foot Locker were targeted by looters. Lambeth Council's leader, Councillor Steve Reed said of the mobs in Streatham, "They were looters not rioters."

==== Wood Green ====
Disorder broke out in Wood Green, two miles (3 km) from Tottenham, during the early hours of 7 August. Widespread looting involved around 100 youths who targeted high-street game shops, electrical shops and clothing chains. Others ransacked local shops on Wood Green High Road. A family-run jeweller was hit.

By 20:00, major rioting had spread to Wood Green, with riot police on hand. Again, the police did not intervene to stop the looting. The mostly Turkish and Kurdish shop owners along Wood Green, Turnpike Lane and Green Lanes, Harringay, formed local 'protection units' around their shops.

==== Other areas ====
- Dalston: Looting hit Kingsland shopping centre including JD Sports and Foot Locker.
- Denmark Hill: A gangland fight broke out at King's College Hospital at about 20:30, where two victims of a minor stabbing had been admitted earlier.
- Islington: The windscreen of a police vehicle was smashed as groups of youths caused a disturbance.
- Leyton: Looting occurred at Currys in Leyton Mills retail park and the bicycle shop Bike Shack.
- Oxford Circus: Overnight, violence spread to Oxford Circus, central London, as about 50 youths gathered and damaged property.
- Shepherd's Bush: The police skirmished on the Edward Wood Estate in Shepherd's Bush, while a shop was looted in King's Road.
- Streatham: A T-Mobile shop, JD Sports and other shops were ransacked. Councillor Mark Bennett said the owner of one shop in Streatham High Road was hospitalised after a mob attacked the shop.
- Woolwich: In Woolwich town centre local shops were looted and set on fire, including the Great Harry Pub, which later became the focus of local opinion about the events and was featured on Sky News after locals began writing their thoughts and messages on the boarded-up shell. Many locals felt that news coverage neglected the Woolwich events.

=== Hertfordshire incidents ===
- Waltham Cross, Hertfordshire: Looters and rioters attacked two police cars and two jewellers in Waltham Cross High Street at around 21:50. A specialist public order unit was sent to the area, along with sections of the Bedfordshire and Hertfordshire Police Dog Unit.

=== Public response ===
On 7 August, riots led to the cancellation of the Hackney One Carnival and Parks for Life Festival in Clissold Park, Stoke Newington.

=== Political and legal response ===
Operation Withern was launched to investigate the cause of Mark Duggan's fatal shooting and the subsequent riots. According to a statement by the Metropolitan Police Service, Operation Withern was being led by Detective Superintendent John Sweeney of the Metropolitan Police Service, and is made up of detectives from the Homicide and Serious Crime Command, specialist investigators from the Public Order Branch and police support staff.

The MP for Brent North, Barry Gardiner, said that community involvement there had so far prevented riots.

The Mayor of London, Boris Johnson, revealed that he had provided an extra £42,000,000 to the Metropolitan Police during the previous year to increase police numbers in London.

=== Police ===
Officers from North Yorkshire Police responded to the request to assist their colleagues in London.

== Monday, 8 August ==
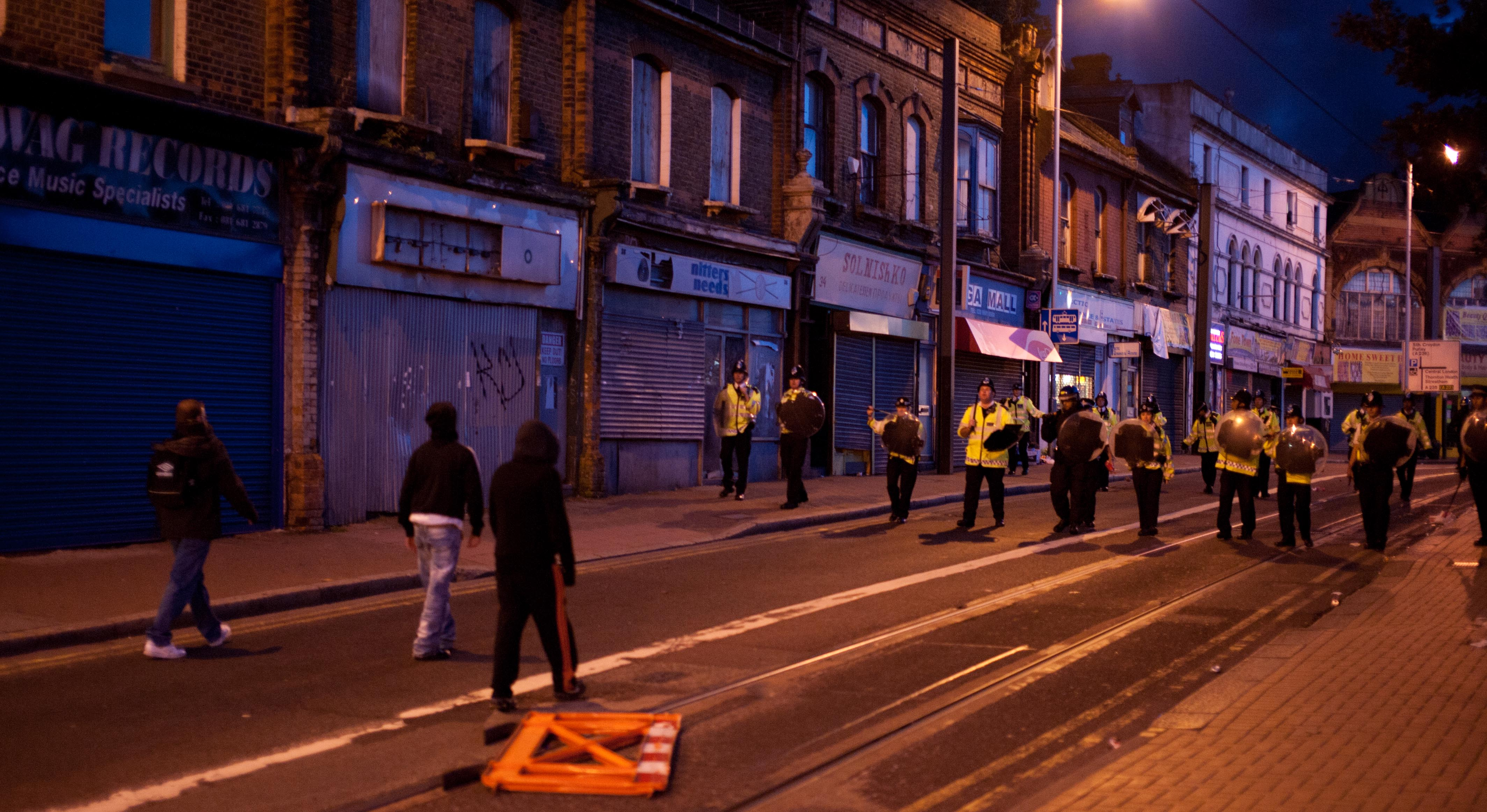
Stand-off between rioters and police in Croydon

=== London ===
By 07:59, the Metropolitan Police Commander Christine Jones said: "This is a challenging situation with small pockets of violence, looting and disorder breaking out on a number of boroughs." Jewellery shops across Tottenham, Enfield and Wood Green suffered break-ins. The Victoria line was closed between Stockwell and Brixton "due to civil unrest", according to London Underground. Angel, Islington, Stoke Newington and Wood Green were in police lockdown. All 32 boroughs of London were placed on riot alert.

==== Croydon ====
Police closed the entire area around West Croydon station on the evening of 8 August. Bricks, bottles, stones and fireworks were thrown at police. Looted shops included branches of Argos, Iceland, House of Fraser, Orange, Maplin Electronics and Tesco. Purley Way stores Best Buy, PC World and Comet were heavily looted for electronics. Many other small businesses were also affected.

A large furniture shop, House of Reeves, which had been in Croydon since 1867, was burned to the ground. Arsonists struck later that night and destroyed another building in the Reeves Corner district of Croydon. A Sky News satellite van came under attack and many shops, cars and buses were set alight in West Croydon. At 19:45, Croydon Advertiser reporter Gareth Davies was mugged while reporting in Surrey Street and Church Street.

A 26-year-old man from Brixton, Trevor Ellis, was shot and killed in South Croydon on Warrington Road. Police believe he was shot after a car chase following an argument over stolen goods, but as of September 2020 had not charged any suspects.

In February 2012, the Croydon Advertiser reported an investigation was underway following reports that only 3% of the police attended to the riots in Croydon whilst others were deployed elsewhere.

==== Ealing ====
Some Ealing businesses were asked by police to close at 5 pm. On Ealing Broadway a group of 200 people attacked police cars and vandalised and looted shops.

Around Haven Green, close to Ealing Broadway tube station, cars and a bus were set alight and many other cars vandalised, shops had their windows smashed, a supermarket was looted and nearby residential properties were burgled. Near Ealing Green more shops were looted, several cars torched and a supermarket set alight with petrol bombs. Rioters attempting to vandalise two pubs in this area were dissuaded by the customers and staff. Hundreds of young people looted shops in West Ealing. There was minor trouble in Ealing Green. A 68-year-old man, Richard Bowes, was assaulted and robbed when he tried to remonstrate with rioters. He was said to be attempting to put out a fire when he was attacked. He was taken to hospital with life-threatening injuries, and died three days later. His killer, Darell Desuze, was sentenced to eight years’ detention.

==== London Borough of Enfield ====
On the morning of 8 August several shops in Enfield Town and in the nearby A10 retail park were vandalised and looted, and two vehicles set ablaze. A large crowd of youths moved westwards, toward nearby Ponders End and wrecked a local Tesco. Hundreds of riot police and canine units arrived with vans and charged at groups of teenagers until they dispersed, smashing cars and shop windows on the way. A large Sony distribution centre was set alight and the fire destroyed the building. Three Watford fire engines were called to the Sony warehouse in Enfield at about 03.30 the next day.

==== Elsewhere in London ====
- Balham: Several shops were looted.
- Barking: A 20-year-old Malaysian student was beaten and then robbed twice by looters in Barking. He suffered a broken jaw, requiring surgery and a night stay in hospital.
- Barnet: About 60 people were chased off by riot police after looting shops in Barnet in the night. Minor disturbances occurred at the Brent Cross shopping centre.
- Battersea: The windows of many shops on Lavender Hill and St. John's Road were smashed, many were looted, and one shop was destroyed by fire. The local Debenhams was looted that night.
- Bayswater: A mob of around 30 teenagers and adults targeted businesses along Queensway. Shops, including Best One and Maplin as well as Whiteley's Shopping Centre, had their windows smashed. The gang tried to loot some of the businesses but the police repelled them. Queensway and Ladbroke Grove tube stations closed early due to the troubles.
- Bethnal Green: Running battles with police occurred in Bethnal Green Road and surrounding streets.
- Camden Town: Minor overnight disturbances broke out in the area, quelled by police.
- Bromley: By 11:30, the police had cordoned off Bromley town centre with both the High Street and Bromley South railway station closed after a stand-off with rioters. The stand-off lasted until at least 18:35.
- Catford: Looters broke into several shops in Rushey Green including an independent opticians, Argos, 99p Stores, JD Sports and a Halfords store.
- Charlton: Police dispersed local riots, but Stone Lake Retail Park shops were looted.
- Chelsea: Looters broke into an antiques shop in King's Road.
- Chingford Mount: Three police officers were hospitalised after being hit by a fast-moving vehicle in Chingford Mount, Waltham Forest, at 00:45. The officers had started making arrests after a shop was being looted by youths.
- Colliers Wood: By 22:12, looting and vandalism hit Colliers Wood retail park until police arrived. A stand-off developed after 21:30 when police withdrew from the Tandem Centre, where the rioters broke into the shops including Sports Direct, JD Sports, PC World and Mothercare.
- Crystal Palace: At 12:10, a group of Crystal Palace residents united to see off the looters.
- Dulwich: A Tesco Express shop on East Dulwich Road and shops in Lordship Lane were looted.
- Fulham: Police made nine arrests as the violence spread to Fulham. The area was cleared by about 1:00 am, with only a smashed window at a Foot Locker shop. Police officers stood guard outside PC World in the Wandsworth Bridge Road business park, as looters threatened to storm in.
- Hackney: Sporadic skirmishes were reported to have occurred between police and groups of young people around Mare Street. Youths threw bottles, petrol bombs and the contents of rubbish bins. Bins and cars were set on fire and the mounted and riot police charged retreating gangs.
- Harlesden: Looters targeted a pawnbroker in the evening. Shops were looted in the town centre, as well as a jewellery shop in Harrow Road.
- London Borough of Hounslow: Both Hounslow and Feltham experienced mass looting of convenience stores and supermarkets, particularly in Hounslow high street and Brentford respectively.
- Ilford: A jewellery shop was targeted and an electrical shop was broken into. Lines of riot police protected Ilford Police Station. A man was treated by paramedics in Ilford Hill at about 19:30. One eyewitness said that the man was "intentionally" hit by a car, which then drove off.
- Islington: Sporadic night-time riots occurred.
- Kingston upon Thames: Kingston's pubs and clubs shut early, with the Wetherspoons, opposite The Oceana Club, one of many to shut early at about 22:00 on police advice as the town braced itself. The online rumour that an offshoot of the rioting had got to Kingston's town centre was unfounded. A Twitter report falsely claimed that Kingston's Bentall Centre was a blazing and looted ruin. Ultimately, Kingston suffered no incidents.
- Lewisham: Sporadic rioting occurred in Lewisham in the evening, but rioters were quickly dispersed by riot police. At 18:35, 15 riot policemen faced down a large group of mainly angry young people in Lee High Road, Lewisham. Police dispersed local riots.
- Notting Hill: Diners at the two Michelin-starred Ledbury restaurant were attacked and robbed.
- Peckham: Shops on Rye Lane and Peckham High Street were looted by a crowd of three to four hundred rioters. A bus was set on fire on Southampton Way and Regen's was destroyed by fire.
- Romford : The windows of many shops and businesses around Romford town centre were smashed, fires were started and Debenhams was looted.
- Streatham: Sporadic night-time riots occurred.
- Surrey Quays: Shops in the Surrey Quays shopping centre and a local Decathlon shop were looted by youths.
- Sutton: Damage was reported to businesses on the High Street and in the Rose Hill area, as well as the looting of a local convenience shop. In Hackbridge there was looting of an off licence and a warehouse. In Sutton Town Centre, shops such as JD Sports, Asda, Argos and HMV were looted, and Asda was set on fire.
- Tooting: By 18:01, two shops had been attacked: a CeX branch on Mitcham Lane and a Ladbrokes branch on Franciscan Road.
- Walthamstow and Walthamstow Central: Over 30 youths wrecked and looted shops, including a branch of BHS in Walthamstow Central that morning. A Santander branch was broken into and a Barclays cash machine was ripped out of a wall.
- Walworth Road: Up to 20 shops on the southern end of Walworth Road were broken into from 19:30 and looted for up to an hour.
- Woolwich: Major disturbances took place overnight. A J D Wetherspoon pub, Blue Inc clothing shop, and a police car were completely burnt out, and a restaurant was set alight. Other buildings along the high street had windows smashed and looted, including jewellers, computer game shops, banks, phone shops, bookmakers and fast food restaurants. Videos appeared online showing outnumbered police fleeing rioters, originally shot by Jellyfielder Studios, a Woolwich-based film production company. This footage was featured on BBC, Sky New, Russia Today, ABC, and later appeared on NBC's Caught on camera, and several Channel 5 Top 20 worst. The Great Harry Pub became the focus of local opinion about the events, and was featured on Sky News after locals began writing their thoughts and messages on the boarded-up shell. The wall was later painted over in black by the local council who refused to comment on why. Many other shops were attacked and looted. Many locals felt that the Woolwich events were neglected in news coverage.

=== West Midlands ===
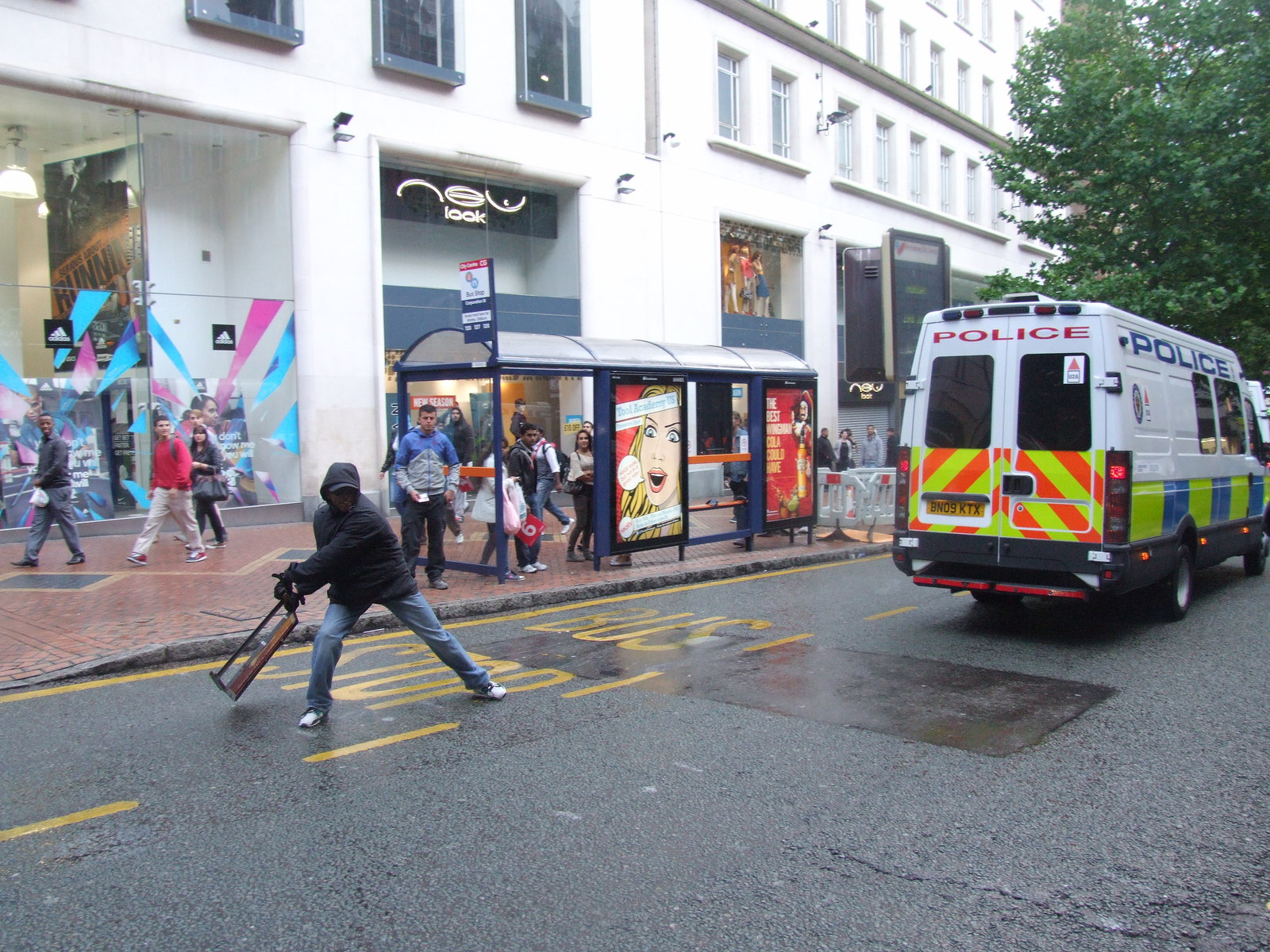
A lone rioter on Corporation Street in Birmingham

- Birmingham: Some shop windows in the city centre were smashed and there were reports of looting in several areas. An unmanned police station in Handsworth was set alight. Police arrested 130.
- West Bromwich: Youths rioted, looting business, smashing shop windows and setting bins and cars alight.

=== Rest of England ===
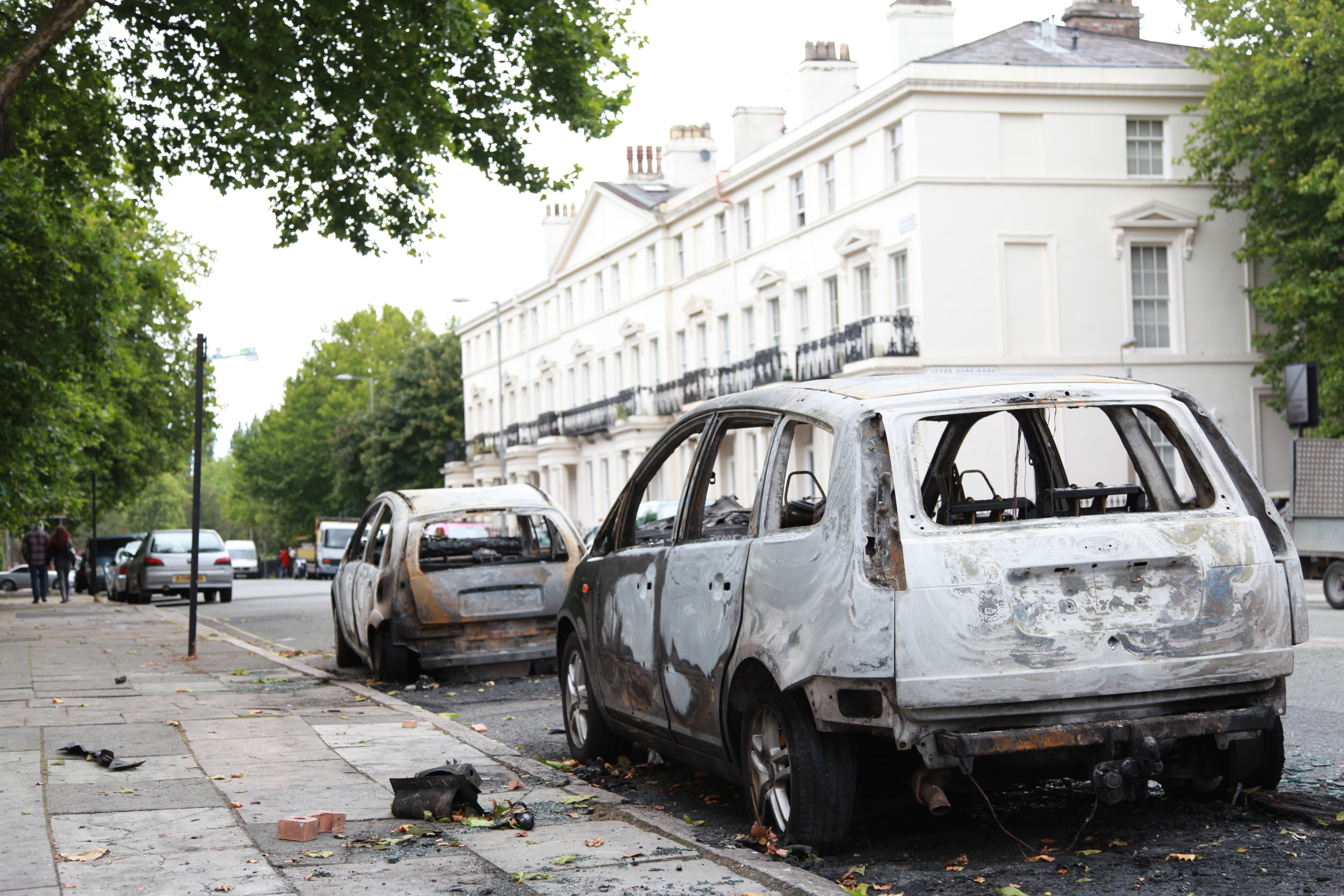
Burnt-out cars in Liverpool.

- Luton: Police officers were deployed to known trouble spots as Twitter and Facebook reports falsely claimed riots in Luton. Two small arson fires occurred – one at Leagrave Motors in Sundon Park Road, Luton, at around midnight, and a rubbish bin set alight at Arrow Close, also in Luton, in the early hours of the morning. The county of Bedfordshire had a CCTV network in operation across every town to monitor and help deploy resources.
- Leicester: No fires but shop windows were still smashed.
- Bristol: Rioters attacked shops.
- Guildford: Surrey Police condemned Twitter reports of rioting in Guildford, acknowledging only minor scuffles.
- Leeds: The Chapeltown area was hit by riots, during which 34-year-old Gavin Clarke was shot in the face and admitted to hospital under armed guard with life-threatening injuries. He was later pronounced dead. This account is contradicted by a BBC report which suggests that the disturbance started as a result of the shooting and that the incident was related, not to the troubles in London and elsewhere in England, but to another shooting that took place in Chapeltown on 2 August 2011 - several days before the London shooting.
- Liverpool: Disturbances occurred in South Liverpool, in particular the area of Toxteth.
- Medway: Rioters burned cars and confronted the police in Gillingham and Chatham.
- Norwich: Shops in one of Norwich's main streets and Royal Arcade were closed early after threats filtered through in relation to the unrest in London.
- Nottingham: A police station in the city centre was attacked, and car tyres were ignited in the St Ann's area.
- Oxford: A McDonald's restaurant in Headington, Oxford was set alight as was a car in Barton, Oxford.

=== Political and legal response ===
- Croydon: The council gave looters a stark warning to stay away from Croydon or face the full force of the law.
- Deputy Prime Minister Nick Clegg toured London's riot-hit communities in and around Tottenham.

=== Police ===
Officers from North Yorkshire Police responded to requests to assist their colleagues in London. A statement by North Yorkshire Police's Temporary Deputy Chief Constable, Tim Madgwick, said:

North Yorkshire Police continue to monitor the aftermath of the disorder affecting other parts of the country, and we can confirm that to date, there are no reports of any similar incidents in North Yorkshire.

The Bedfordshire and Hertfordshire Civil Contingencies and Public Order Planning Unit sent a Police Support Unit (PSU) to London. Custody space in Bedfordshire cells and call taking support was also offered.

=== Richard Mannington Bowes ===
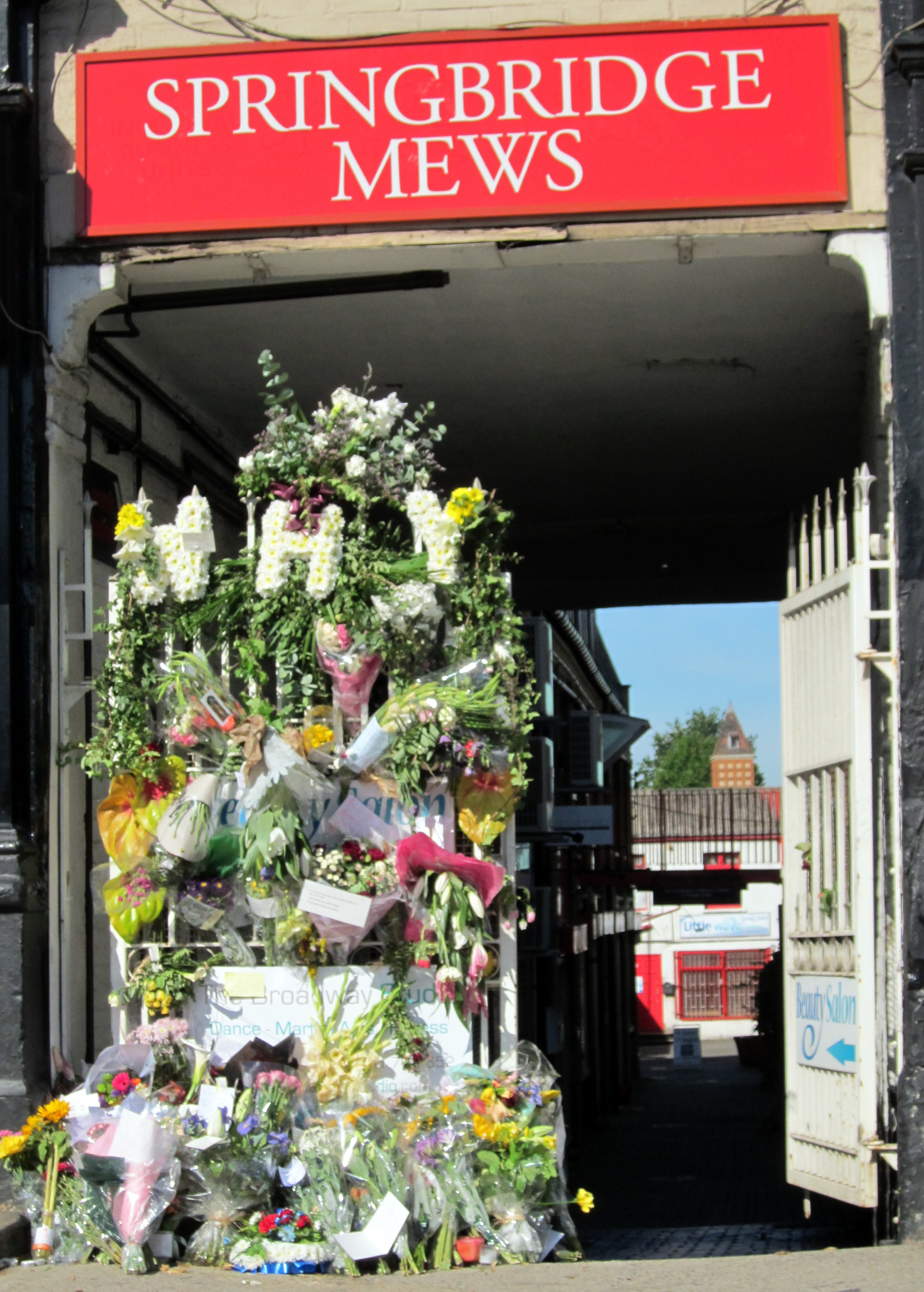
Floral tributes at the site of the fatal assault. The flowers at the top spell out the word "why".

Bowes was a 68-year-old British retired accountant who died as a result of being attacked in the street in Ealing. He was the fifth fatality related to events associated with the riots. He was attacked by a mob on 8 August 2011, while attempting to extinguish an arson fire in industrial bins on Spring Bridge Road. The attack left him in a coma. The assault was caught on CCTV and filmed on mobile phones by associates of the man who hit him.

Police officers arrived at 10:45pm in response to reports of looting at the Arcadia shopping centre. They were not wearing protective gear and were outnumbered by approximately 120 rioters. The attack on Bowes was witnessed by several police officers, but they were unable to respond in time. They requested assistance as they were showered with bottles and bricks. Riot squad officers who responded had to push back rioters while being attacked to reach Bowes. A line of officers then held back the rioters as paramedics arrived.

Bowes was found without a wallet or phone as they had been stolen, and police initially faced difficulty in identifying him. He died of his injuries in St Mary's Hospital on 11 August 2011 after being removed from life support.

A 22-year-old man was arrested on suspicion of murder, rioting and committing three burglaries; he was released on bail. A 16-year-old boy was arrested for Bowes' murder and for burglary.

Bowes had moved to Ealing in 1994. He lived alone in a flat in Haven Green. He was described as quiet and shy and a loner. He is reported to have previously challenged anti-social behaviour in the area. On one occasion, ten years earlier, he was fined for confronting youths who were urinating outside his home.

Revulsion at Bowes's death was widespread. Ealing Council flew the Union Flag at half-mast over its town hall as a mark of respect. It also announced that it was launching the Richard Mannington Bowes Relief Fund in his memory.

Bowes was hailed as a hero for his actions by the media and politicians. Mayor Johnson was particularly vocal: "I feel desperately sorry and sad for him, and what a hero he is. He walked straight up in front of the looters and tried to stop what was happening. He is an example to everybody."

There are many villains in this story but also many heroes and I want to pay particular tribute to Mr Bowes. He has paid a terrible price.

— London Mayor Boris Johnson

== Tuesday, 9 August ==
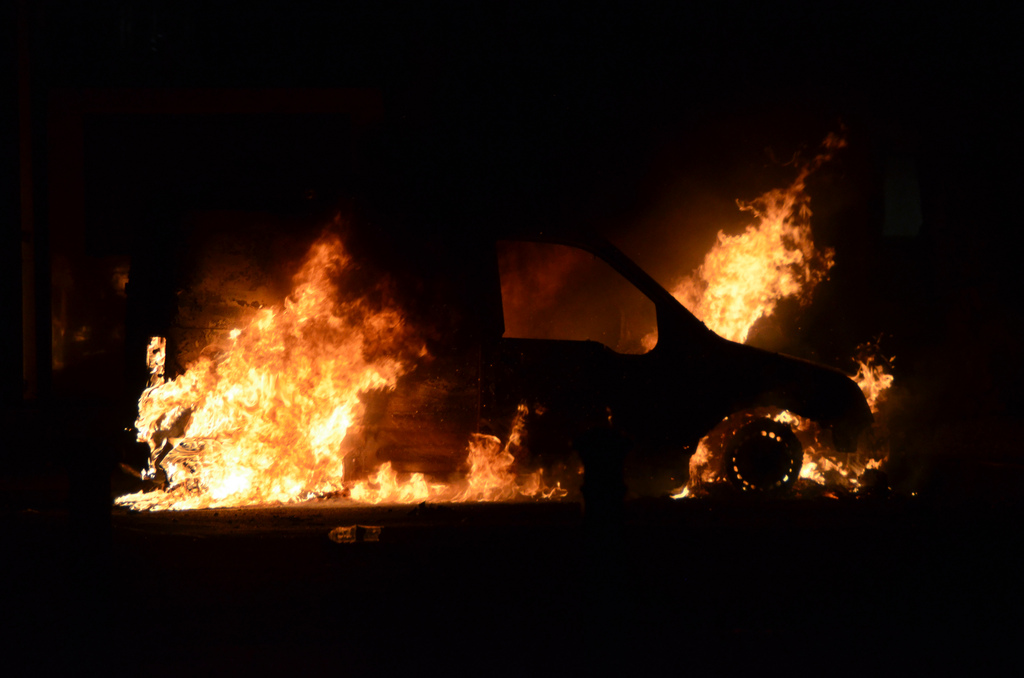
Burning car in Manchester

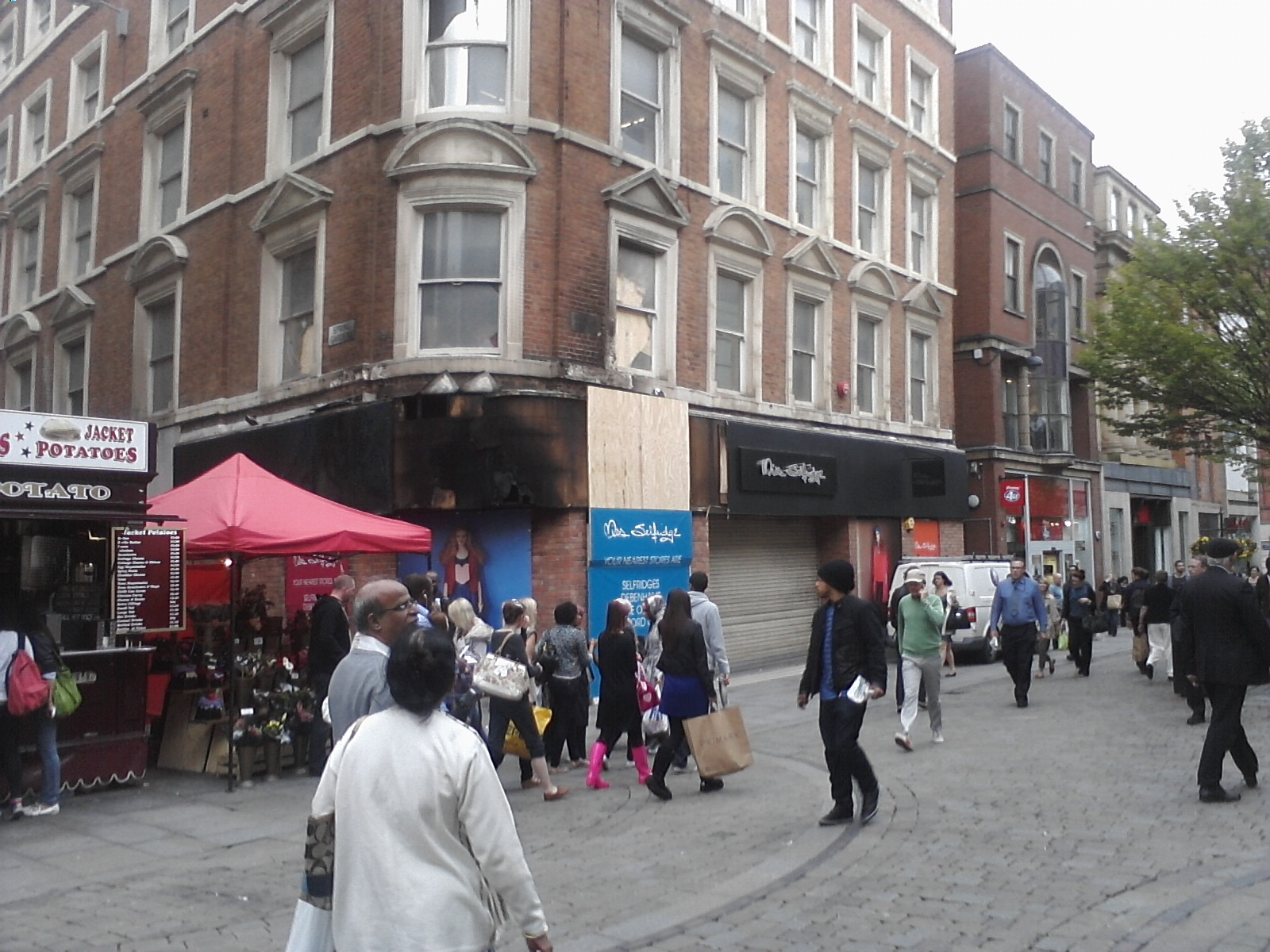
Miss Selfridge shop in Market Street (Manchester) fire-damaged

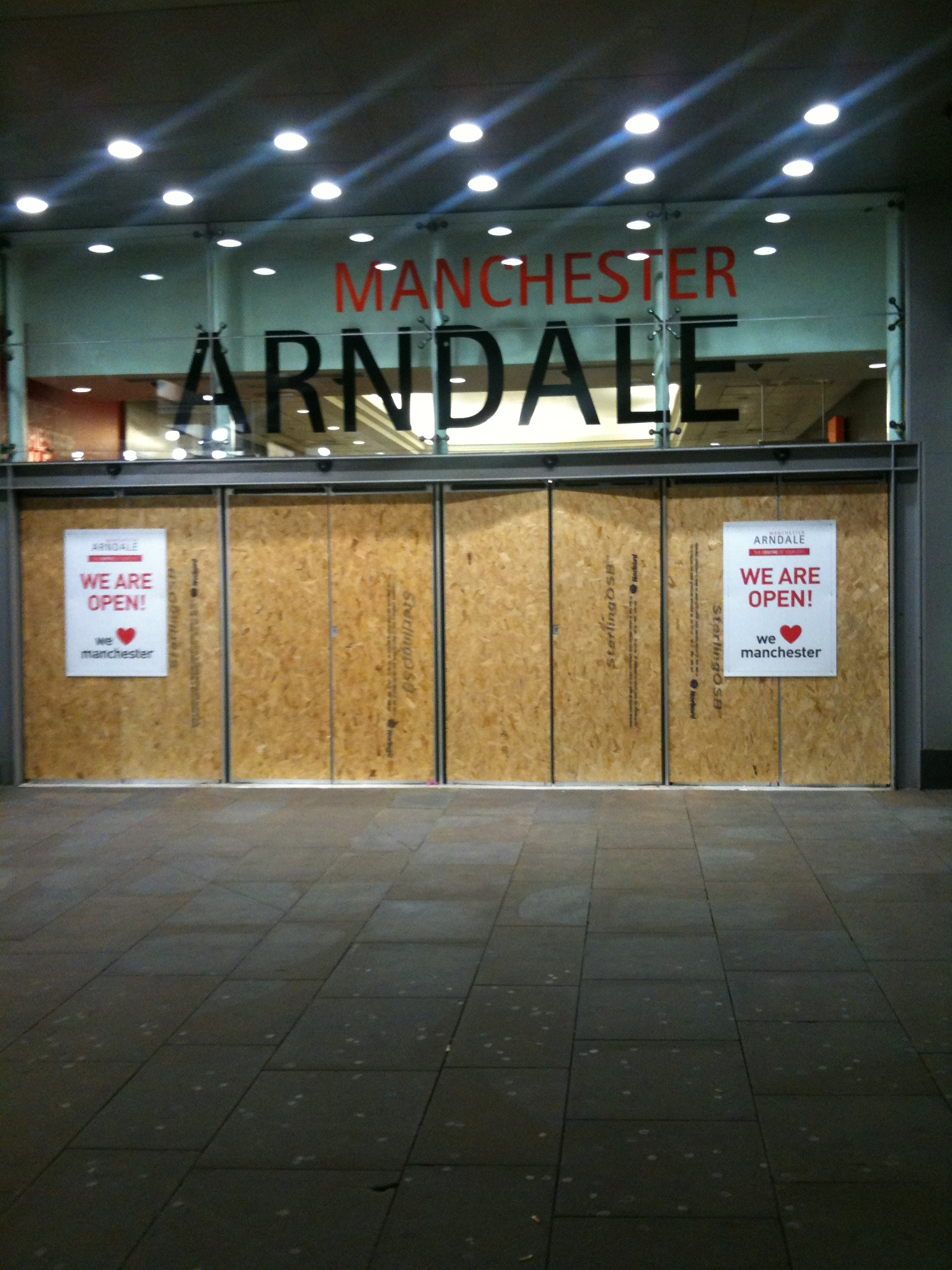
Damaged entrance to Manchester Arndale Centre

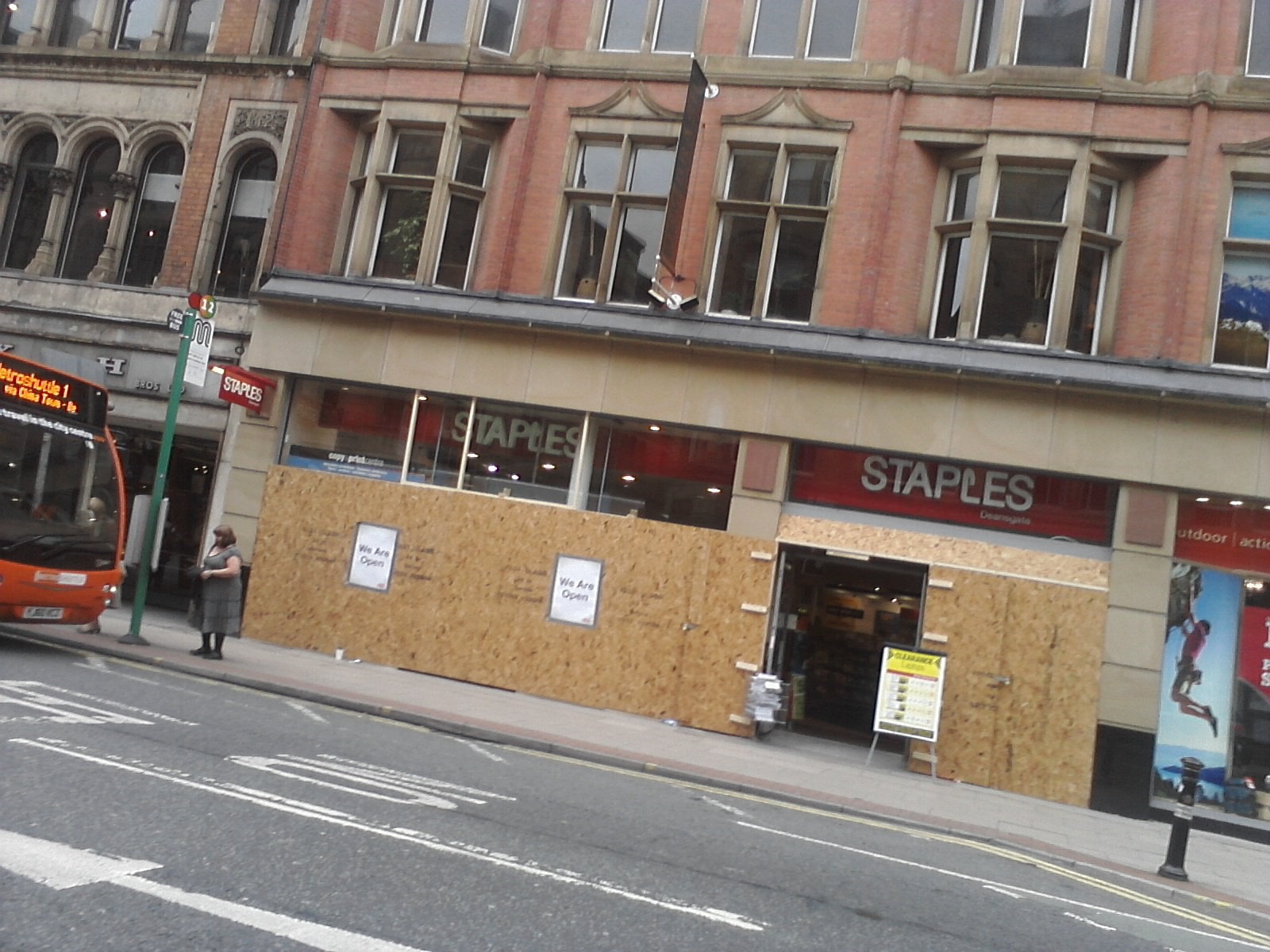
Damage to Staples shop, Deansgate

=== Early hours ===
Time Magazine wrote "Not since the blitz during World War II have so many fires raged in London so intensely at one time".

==== London Borough of Enfield ====
Looters burned a Sony-owned warehouse in Solar Way, Enfield which acted as the primary distribution hub for the independent music distributor PIAS Entertainment Group. Three Watford fire engines were called to the continuing Sony warehouse fire in Enfield at about 03.30 that day.

==== London Borough of Havering ====
In the morning, youths formed groups of 10 to 12 in areas across Havering, including Romford, Hornchurch, Collier Row, Rainham, Harold Hill and Upminster, a police spokesman said, but officers dispersed groups or issued street warnings and spot deterrents.

Arrests took place for low-level crimes like spitting at an officer and ABH, since officers were highly visible. Around 50 special police volunteers responded, helping to man potentially volatile situations. Fire crews reported a quiet night.

==== London Borough of Merton ====
Looting continued throughout the early hours within the Tandem Centre and Priory retail estates in Merton. Police withdrew after coming under attack from a group of over 100 people. Mothercare, JD Sports and PC World were targeted, with Mothercare and Harveys the victims of arson. Police retook the retail parks approximately 3 hour after their withdrawal. Sporadic looting was reported, with convenience stores in Phipps Bridge and a Betting shop in Mitcham was looted.

==== Elsewhere in London ====
- Beckton: Unspecified trouble at the Gallions Reach shopping centre resulted in multiple road closures.
- Camden: Crowds gathered at Chalk Farm tube station at 1am. Asians guarded their shops. Police drove back looters in Camden High Street and Chalk Farm Road, Camden.
- Kilburn and Kingsbury: A Vodafone shop in Kilburn High Road was targeted by looters. Looters also hit jewellery stores in Kilburn and Kingsbury.
- Holloway scuffles occur in the early hours.
- Wimbledon: Minor incidents occurred in south Wimbledon, the Wimbledon town centre and a handful of shops in Wimbledon Village. The police eventually dispersed them.
- Major fires were started in Barking, Battersea, Croydon, Dagenham, Ealing, Greenwich and Southwark.
- Croydon: Local scuffles were quickly dispersed.
- Camberwell: A small fire was started by arsonists.
- Islington: The police in Islington appealed for people to stay at home and for shops to close early.
- Hammersmith and Fulham Hammersmith and Fulham Council urged people to keep calm and stay indoors.
- Wembley: A police officer was run over by looters at approximately 2:50 am. Three people were arrested for attempted murder.

==== Greater Manchester ====
- Manchester: The reported riot was an Internet hoax, since it was only a quickly dispersed scuffle.
- Salford: The reported riot was an Internet hoax; it was only a quickly dispersed scuffle.

==== Rest of England ====
- Brighton: The reported riot was an internet hoax, actually a quickly dispersed scuffle.
- Derby: Over 20 cars and a local shop were damaged in a series of overnight disturbances in the Campbell Street, Allenton and Brighton Road, Alvaston areas. A pair of 15-year-olds were arrested.
- Leeds and Bradford: West Yorkshire Police confirmed there were scuffles in the Chapeltown borough of Leeds, but no rioting as alleged on Twitter and Facebook. False social media reports that riots were occurring in Bradford were denounced by police
- Northampton: Groups of youths pelt police and vehicles with bricks and stones, and smash a police van's windscreen
- Caterham: Traders braced for violent scenes similar to those seen in nearby Croydon. Surrey Police maintained a strong presence to reassure the citizens, but many stores were closed. Shops that specialised in high-value goods such as mobile phones and fine art stayed shut all day. Esquire Fine Menswear on Station Avenue had its windows damaged by hooligans just after 01.30.
- Southampton: Messages appeared on BBM & Facebook inciting a riot, leading to a few scuffles in Millbrook & Shirley which Hampshire Constabulary broke up.
- Wolverhampton: Local scuffles were quickly dispersed.

=== Daytime ===
London

- Sloane Square: looters smashed the windows of Hugo Boss in Sloane Square.
- Richmond upon Thames: A police spokesperson said "We are providing patrols to the retail park and Richmond town centre to reassure and prevent and detect crime."
- Finchley: A car was torched in Hendon Avenue, Finchley.
- Harrow: The Metropolitan Police dispersed local riots.
- Ealing: The Metropolitan Police dispersed local riots.
- Barnet: The Metropolitan Police dispersed local riots.
- Surbiton was in a Metropolitan Police and Surrey Police riot lockdown. The shops and cafes were shutting down early on police advice.
- Bromley: Rioters attacked a sports bar during the morning.
- Balham: By 13.00, looters had hit the T-Mobile shop and emptied it over a period of 90 minutes.
- Dartford, Bexley and Bexleyheath: The Bluewater Shopping Centre drafted in extra police officers to deal with the potential threat of rioters. The extra police were from a riot squad. Minor scuffles had hit Bexley early that day.
- Merton: Several attempts were made by groups to congregate in the Colliers Wood area. Due to the high number of police in the area (including a high number of Merton's Special Constables), they were prevented from meeting up with each other. A police dog unit came under fire with bricks and other items, and over 20 police officers responded. There was reported groups causing issues in Wimbledon Town Centre however Police dispersed them
- Newham: Gangs of youths looted and vandalised parts of East Ham, including branches of Argos, Primark, Tesco, an electronics shop as well as banks. Stones were being thrown at the Argos shop in Stratford until the police had intervened. The front of Stratford Centre was heavily guarded by police to prevent trouble.
- Sutton: By 10:01, the entrance to Matalan in Sutton was targeted. An estimated 25 police officers arrived in vans armed with batons and shields in case the situation escalated.

Rest of England

- West Bromwich: Youths rioted in High Street, looted business, smashing shop windows, and setting bins and cars alight. Police cordoned off the riot zone and some police vans were used to control the mob.
- Greater Manchester: Both Central Manchester and Salford saw serious looting and disorder, and running battles between gangs and riot police.

The fire crews from Richmond and Twickenham helped put out fires in neighbouring boroughs as rioting spread across London. Richmond's red watch was called to Merton where they tackled a blaze at Priory retail estate in Colliers Wood.

=== Night ===
==== London ====
- London: Shops and businesses closed early across the capital after reports of another night of widespread violence. The streets were flooded with 16,000 police officers, with Special Constables requested to report for duty to assist their regular colleagues. A 'Zero tolerance' approach was adopted, and any attempt at disorder was quickly halted.
- Surbiton: Many shops and restaurants closed early, removed valuables and boarded up their windows on police advice. Many pubs and restaurants did stay open, but some closed at 22:00. Few problems resulted.

==== West Midlands ====
- Birmingham: Disorderly conduct took place in Birmingham city centre with three people arrested. Some groups tried to break into the Mailbox shopping and office centre and the Pallisades shopping complex. Officers wielding batons eventually dispersed the crowd by charging them, but soon after they gathered again outside a House of Fraser shop, their numbers swelling to around 500. Shortly after 19.00 the mob broke into and looted a nearby Tesco. The police dispersed the 300 strong crowd using a "thunderflash" device, quickly charging the crowd, but the gangs regrouped and attacked shops, including the Jobcentre in Queen Street and Burton's menswear. A police station in the suburb of Handsworth was also burnt. At around 23.30 the historic Bartons Arms pub in Aston was looted, its windows smashed, and fires started, albeit quickly doused by the landlord. Eleven shots were fired at police who attended the incident, including at a police helicopter and petrol bombs were thrown at officers.
- Olton: Police quickly dispersed a mob outside a post office in Olton.
- Coventry: A minor incident occurred in one street in a suburb of Coventry.
- Wolverhampton: West Midlands Police responded to reports of a large group of people in Wolverhampton city centre after shops were damaged.

==== Merseyside ====
- Birkenhead: Cars were set alight and businesses damaged.
- Liverpool: 200 rioters hurled missiles at officers in Smithdown Road.

==== Greater Manchester ====
- Manchester: Riots affected Manchester for the first time. At least one building was set alight. Buses, trams and taxis were stopped from entering the city centre. Looting started in the evening in St. Ann's Square, Market Street, Piccadilly Gardens and Oldham Street. Several shops were looted including a Marks & Spencer food shop, several pawn shops, an Oxfam charity shop and Dawsons Music. Charges against the teenager referred to in the Mail article were later dropped and a 50-year-old man arrested after new evidence was found. The rioters dispersed in the late hours of Tuesday, and rioting did not recur in Manchester.

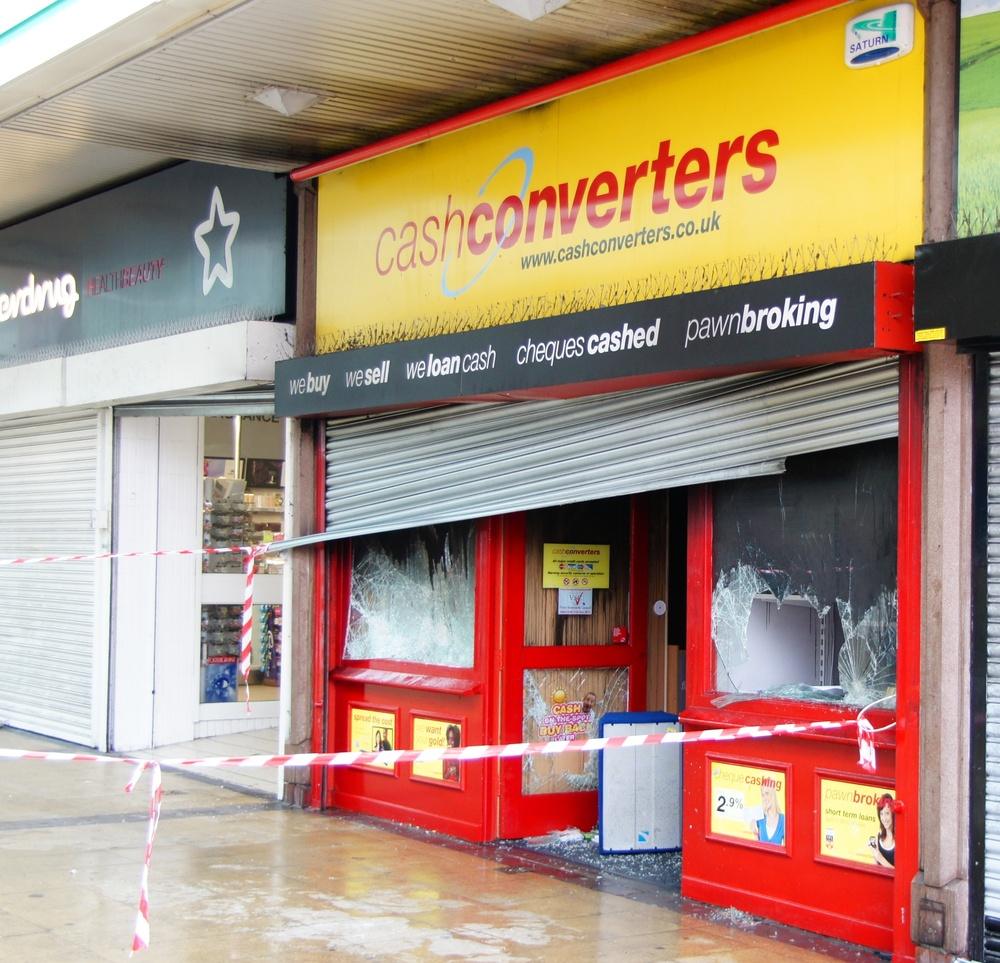
Cash Converters shop in Salford

- Salford: 80 people confronted police at Salford Precinct. A library was set alight and there was looting. A gang of up to 200 youths raided an off-licence and the main shopping precinct in Salford. The Lidl supermarket on nearby Fitzwarren Street was looted, trashed and set alight by rioters.

==== Rest of England ====
- Banbury: Police dispersed local scuffles.
- Basildon: About 350 youths smashed shop windows and set fires in Basildon town centre before being dispersed. Fire-fighters were attacked by rioters as they attempted to respond to an incident.
- Bristol: An event described as an "incident of disobedience" was reported at a young offenders' institution in Ashfield.
- Cambridge: A group of 30 to 40 youths clashed with police by Midsummer Common and the Grafton Centre. Five arrests were made. Two police officers were treated for minor injuries.
- Canvey Island: Eleven arson attacks were reported with the targets ranging from rubbish bins to vehicles.
- Derby: Local scuffles were dispersed .
- Gloucester: Central Eastgate shopping area, the Argos, HMV and Primark stores were targeted. Just a few hundred yards from Gloucester's famous Norman Cathedral, rioters set fire to a former art college, torched two cars and many rubbish bins.
- High Wycombe: Police dispersed local scuffles.
- Huddersfield: An attempt was made to loot an Asda shop.
- Luton: Rioters threw stones at police officers and started small fires. No arrests were made as the anticipated riots did not take place and the strong police presence prevent any opportunity for disorder.
- Nottingham: Multiple incidents were reported including attacks on police stations in The Meadows, St Ann's and Canning Circus near Radford.
- Reading: Police dispersed local scuffles.
- Southampton: Hampshire Constabulary ordered shops to close early, and placed riot police in Southampton City Center after tweets, BBMs and Facebook messages were discovered inciting a riot.
- Watford: The Halifax Building Society was among the businesses to close early in case of a riot. A few scuffles took place.

==== In Wales ====
- Cardiff: police investigated four incidents, including a failed break-in at a branch of the JD Sports chain.

=== Political and legal response ===
Prime Minister David Cameron returned early from his Italian summer holiday and chaired an emergency meeting of COBR, following the third night of violence. In a statement at 11:00, Cameron announced that 16,000 police officers would be deployed in London, with all police leave cancelled. He announced that Parliament would be recalled on 11 August to debate the situation. Over 525 people had been arrested since the start of the disruption, and the Metropolitan Police have announced their intention to use baton rounds against rioters if necessary. East Ham's Labour MP Stephen Timms and Newham's Mayor Robin Wales praised police for their efforts that day.

=== Police ===
Officers from the Thames Valley, Essex, Kent, City of London, Norfolk, North Yorkshire, Hertfordshire, Bedfordshire, Surrey and Sussex police constabularies sent officers to help tackle the London riots.

=== Arrests ===
By 9 August 2011 563 arrests had been made in London since the start of the disruption, and 100 arrests made in Birmingham.

A 16-year-old boy was charged with breach of the peace in connection with a message inciting rioting in Scotland on a social networking site. The boy was detained on the south side of Glasgow about 12.40 over the Facebook page entitled "Let's Start a Riot in Glasgow", which was related to a similar site called "Glasgow Riot FRIDAY 12TH". Both the sites were shuttered.

== Wednesday, 10 August ==
- Bristol: Avon and Somerset police arrested 19 people following a second night of minor trouble.
- Coulsdon: Looters raided GT Shooting's gun shop in Chipstead Valley Road at 08:47.
- Gloucester saw stone and bottle throwing that morning, but order was quickly restored.
- Leicester Police officers arrested 13 following disturbances in the city centre.
- Liverpool: 200 missile-throwing rioters gathered in the south Liverpool area of Toxteth and caused disorder and damage, according to Merseyside police. Scuffles in Edge Hill, and Wavertree were dispersed. Merseyside police said that 35 arrests were made.
- London: Groups of citizens and shop owners formed in Enfield, Eltham and Southall, in an attempt to prevent looting. A senior police officer said that vigilante groups were hampering police operations. In the evening, police clashed with a bottle-throwing crowd of about 200 vigilantes in Eltham, containing many English Defence League members. Jack England, the EDL's south-east regional organiser, claimed to be combining 50 EDL members with local vigilantes to control the streets. Overnight a small group of men, threw stones and bottles at the police until they were dispersed.
- Nottingham: A police station and college were firebombed, shops including House of Fraser inside the Victoria Centre where damaged, pubs were damaged and cars and lorries were set fire to. More than 90 people were arrested.
- The Thames Valley: Thames Valley Police dispersed minor scuffles in Reading, Oxford and Milton Keynes that morning.
- West Bromwich: Parts of the town centre, and several vehicles, were set on fire.
- Portsmouth: A nightclub catches fire by South Parade Pier causing the whole esplanade to be shut off. It took the Police 3 hours to put the fire out, the building had to be demolished. To this date it is unknown if this was connected to the riots.
- Worcester: 50 West Mercia officers were deployed to deal with hooded gangs in Worcester and the surrounding towns of Kidderminster, Redditch and Droitwich. Two cars were set on fire in Worcester.
- Slough: Shops and leisure facilities - including Absolutely Karting, Absolutely Ten Pin, Absolutely Ice, Montem and Langley leisure centres closed early. The Sainsbury's in Uxbridge Road closed at 10pm rather than 11pm as an anti-looter precaution. The fire brigade confirmed they were put on standby, but nothing happened. The rumours of a major planned riot was just local rumours.
- St Albans: Arson attack led to the complete destruction of the Batchwood Tennis and Golf Centre.

=== Political and legal response ===
David Cameron chaired another emergency meeting of COBRA, mid-morning. In a statement at 11:05, Cameron announced that plastic bullets were available to the police for use in response to the riots if necessary, and put contingency plans in place to make water cannons available at 24 hours notice.

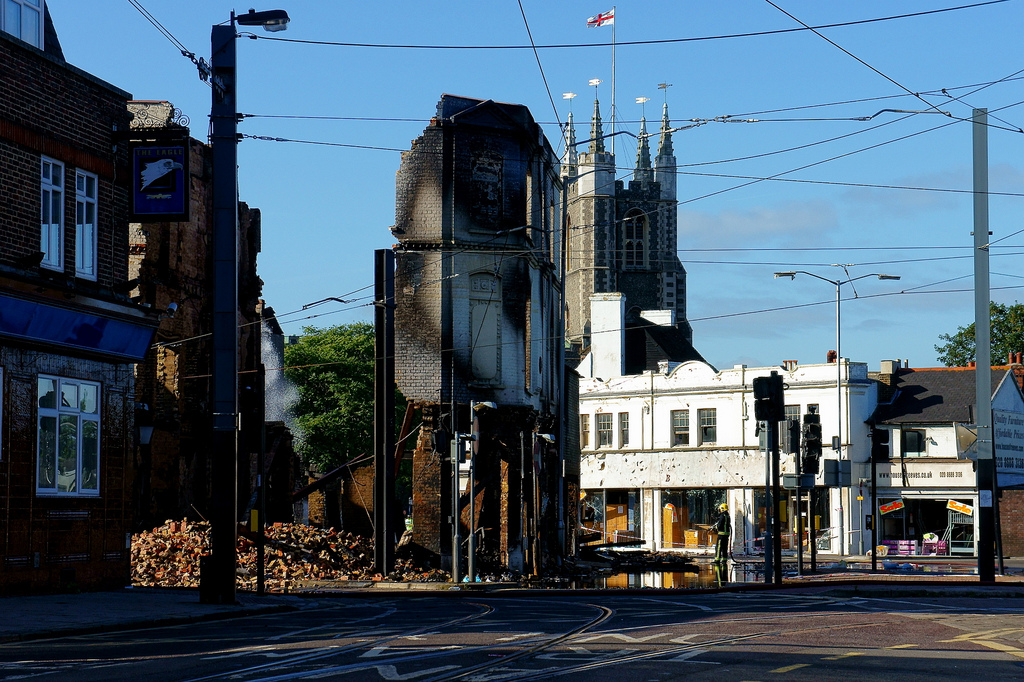
The remains of the House of Reeves shop in Croydon

The Acting Scotland Yard Commissioner Tim Godwin condemned the "gratuitous" violence by the rioters.

The assistant chief constable of Norfolk police, Charlie Hall, slammed people who used Twitter and Facebook to post "fictitious and malicious rumours" that the riots had moved to many to safe, including Norwich. Looters had never struck either in Anglia Square or at PC World.

=== Public response ===
The family of Mark Duggan said they "are not condoning" the riots and looting that rocked north London, that left 26 police officers injured.

Local Christians gathered in Derby's Market Place yesterday to hold a prayer meeting to ask for God's help and love towards all those involved in the riots.

=== Weather ===
Persistent heavy rain reduced the numbers of rioters or wandering groups on the streets.

=== Arrests ===
By 08:05, police had made more than 1,100 arrests, including 768 in London, 35 in Liverpool, 5 in Milton Keynes, 90 in Nottingham, 13 in Leicester and 19 in Bristol. By 15:00, the police had made 113 arrests in Greater Manchester.

== Aftermath ==
=== Thursday, 11 August ===
==== Incidents ====
- Banbury: Arsonists were thought to be responsible for three fires in Banbury, involving a burning car in Waterworks Road near Hennef Way, a fire in a skip to the rear of a house in Bretch Hill and the Pepper Pot in Grimsbury where a recycling bin had been set alight.
- Dunstable: The Norman King pub, a building in Dunstable, Bedfordshire that dates back to 1109 was destroyed after being set on fire in an arson attack, though police did not link the incident to riots occurring elsewhere in the country, after initial public fears were allayed.
- Police were praised for their efforts in preventing riots in the Hillingdon. Police manned positions in Uxbridge High Street and Hayes Town. One unspecified crime occurred in the Tesco on Uxbridge Road, Hillingdon town, which was closed and cordoned off by police that morning.

==== Political and legal response ====
Parliament was recalled from its summer recess.

Cameron told lawmakers there would be no "culture of fear" on Britain's streets, and that the government would consider taking gang-fighting tips from American cities such as Boston. He mentioned former Los Angeles and New York Police Chief Bill Bratton as someone who could offer advice. He said he also wanted to build on the success of programmes to tackle gang culture, such as the task force used by Strathclyde Police. Both Theresa May and Cameron accused the Metropolitan Police service and the West Midlands Police force of being "too few, too slow, too timid" during the rioting in London and the West Midlands county. He said the police on the streets of London were too few and used poor and incorrect tactics when dealing with the rioters.

Cameron said that the government, police and intelligence services were looking at whether there should be limits on the use of social media sites such as Twitter and Facebook or services such as BlackBerry Messenger to spread organised disorder, and whether to turn off social networks or stop texting during times of social unrest.

==== Arrests ====
The number of arrestees in London rose to 922 and 401 suspects had been charged. The police said they had arrested 330 people over the past four nights. One of the arrested people was an 11-year-old girl from Nottingham.

=== Friday, 12 August ===
The Prime Minister promised to use the Riot Damages Act, to cover uninsured facilities and buildings and set up a £20,000,000 fund for High Street businesses to use relief following riots.

Of more than one thousand people arrested during the three days of troubles in London, about six hundred had been charged by 12 August.

==== IPCC investigation ====
The IPCC watchdog admitted that it inadvertently led media to believe shots were exchanged and that Mark Duggan was carrying a gun that was never used.

=== Saturday, 13 August ===
Police forces around England, and especially those in London, Birmingham, Manchester and Nottingham increased their numbers on the streets. Bill Bratton was announced as Cameron's new crime adviser.

=== Sunday, 14 August ===
An estimated 2,000 people joined a vigil in Summerfield Park and laid flowers in memory of officers men who died protecting shops from looters in Winson Green, Birmingham. They were victims of a hit and run attack.

Scotland Yard stated that 2,140 people had been arrested, of whom about 1,000 had been charged.

=== Tuesday, 16 August ===
The Deputy PM Nick Clegg said that the government would set up an independent "community and victims panel" to look into the riots. He pledged that when an offender who leaves prison from March 2012 they will be met by providers on the Work Programme at the prison gate.

A 16-year-old from Hounslow was to be tried for the murder of Richard Mannington Bowes as well as violent disorder and four counts of burglary relating to the looting at a William Hill bookmakers, a Tesco Express, a Blockbuster video shop and a Fatboys restaurant.

Martin McRobb, the Crown Advocate for CPS Mersey-Cheshire, read out in Chester court that "Jordan Blackshaw and Perry Sutcliffe independently and from the safety of their homes may have thought that it would be acceptable to set up a Facebook page to incite others to take part in disorders in Cheshire." Cheshire Constabulary had discovered that they used a Facebook group that Blackshaw created to promote the rioting. Blackshaw was from Northwich and Sutcliffe was from Warrington.

=== Wednesday, 17 August ===
The Liberal Democrat MP for Bradford East, David Ward, described government plans to withdraw benefits from convicted rioters as "nuts". Cameron defended the scheme.

Prince Charles and Camilla, Duchess of Cornwall visited areas of London, including the Tottenham Green Leisure Centre, which was transformed into an aid centre in the aftermath of the rioting.

=== Saturday, 20 August ===
West Midlands Police released pictures of gunmen shooting at police officers in both Birmingham and Wolverhampton. A police helicopter was shot at in the Newton part of Birmingham.

=== Monday, 29 August ===
Jae-Kiel Van Eda, 28, was arrested after participating in an act in which 2 constables were hit by a green Citroen while they were dealing with reports of a group looting a clothes shop in Waltham Forest, north-east London on 8 August. One officer suffered knee and leg injuries and the other shoulder injuries.

=== Wednesday, 31 August ===
As of 31 August, a total of 2,987 were arrested and an estimated £100m of damage recorded in 93 shops and other premises.
