= House of Reeves =

Furniture store in London, England

Coordinates: 51.373701°N 0.105623°W

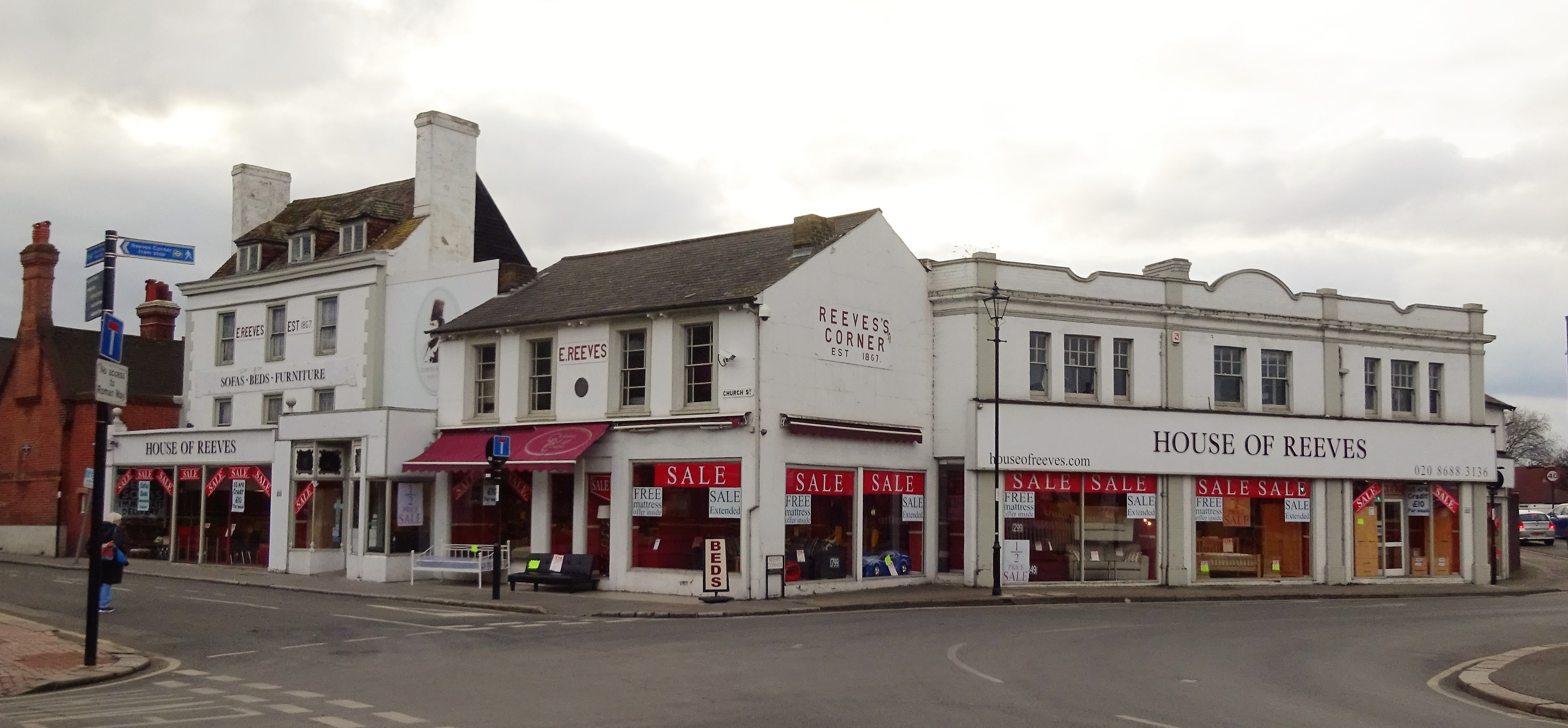
- House of Reeves in 2018
- Founded: 1867
- Founder: Edwin Reeves
- Headquarters: 120 Church Street, Croydon, Greater London, England
- Key people: The Reeves family
- Number of employees: 15
- Website: houseofreeves.com

House of Reeves is an independent family-run furniture store in Croydon, southern Greater London, England, founded in 1867. It is located in the Old Town area, and gives its name to Reeves Corner, a road intersection between Church Street and Roman Way, and so to Reeves Corner tram stop.

The company came to widespread national public attention in August 2011, when one of its two adjacent buildings was destroyed in an arson attack during the 2011 England riots. Images of the furniture store on fire, with firefighters unable to arrive in time to tackle the fire because police could not guarantee their safety, became symbolic of the violence that spread across the country during several days of rioting and looting. Despite this setback, the company is still trading.

== History ==
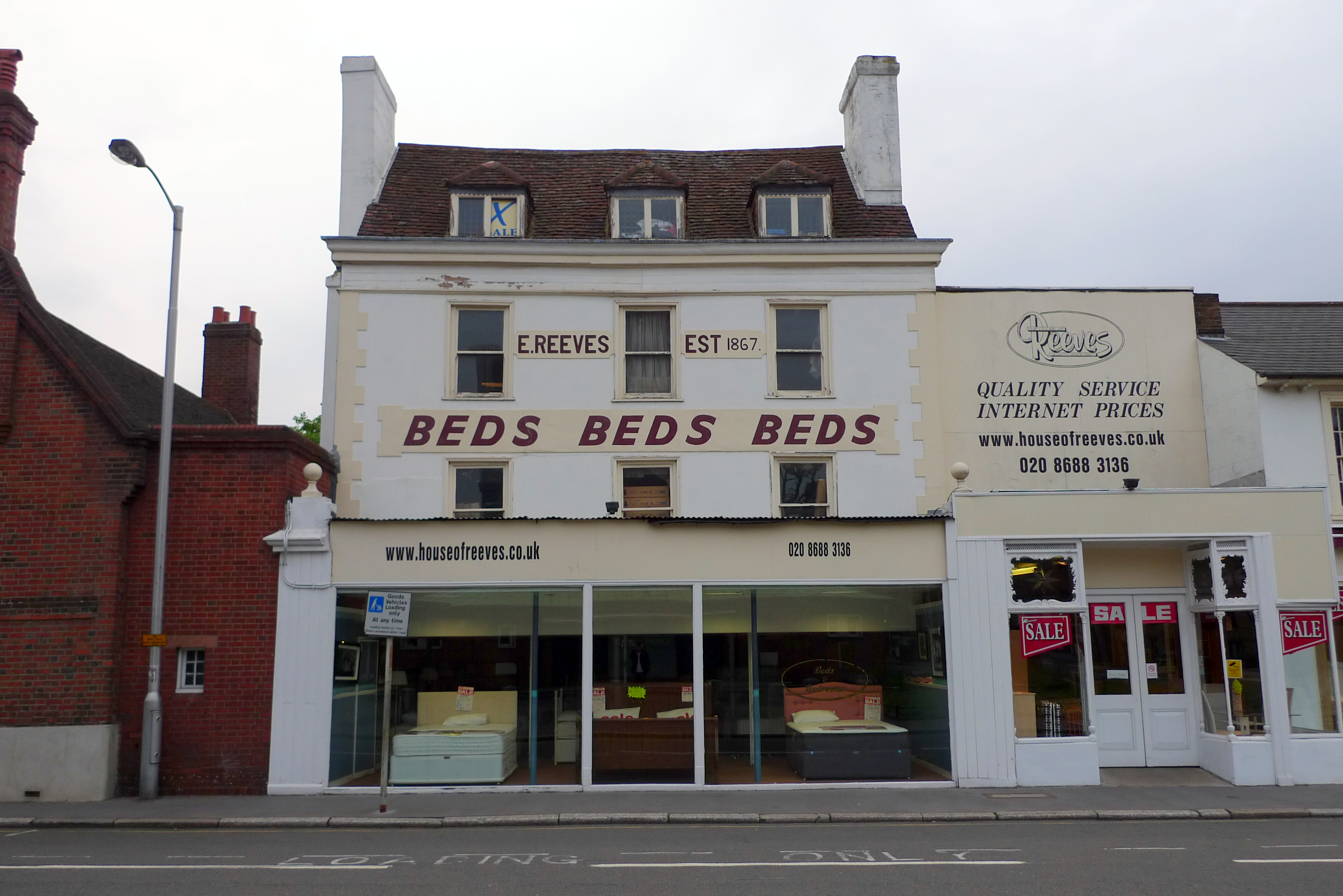
120 Church Street, Edwin Reeves' original store, photographed in 2010

The store was founded in 1867 as Ye Olde Curiositie Shoppe on Church Street – in the Old Town area of Croydon, next to the Elis David Almshouses, and close to Croydon Parish Church – by Edwin Reeves, a cooper from Sherborne, Dorset. He subsequently extended his business to include the sale of ironmongery, and later furniture. In 1913, he passed the business to his son, William. William expanded the store from the original premises, 120 Church Street, into neighbouring properties, acquiring 114–18 Church Street in 1915, and a lease of the Old Victory Coffee Tavern in 1916. The upper part of the tavern (formerly a lodging house) was converted to auction rooms, and the lower part to second-hand furniture showrooms. In 1921, he acquired the Dome Picture Palace; and at later dates 110 and 112 Church Street. In 1967 the store was threatened by a redevelopment scheme for Old Town, but was saved after the Church Street Traders' Association protested that "the future prosperity of the lower part of Church Street materially depends on the preservation of the business of Messrs E. Reeves Ltd, at or near the present site". By 1970, now occupying ten shops in four streets, the business could be described as "one of the town's shopping landmarks". The firm's last furniture auction on the site was held in 1985.

The firm became a limited company in 1947, trading as E. Reeves Ltd. In the 1980s it began trading as House of Reeves. It continued to be run as a family business, passing in turn from William Reeves Sr. to William Jr., and then to Maurice Reeves, the company chairman as of 2011. The Croydon business is run by Maurice's sons, Trevor and Graham. Another of Edwin Reeves' great-great-grandsons is Marc Reeves, former editor of the Birmingham Post.

In 1919, William Reeves Sr. visited his brother in Sherborne, who subsequently opened a shop there, which became a branch of the Croydon store; and in 1929 a second branch was opened at Caterham.

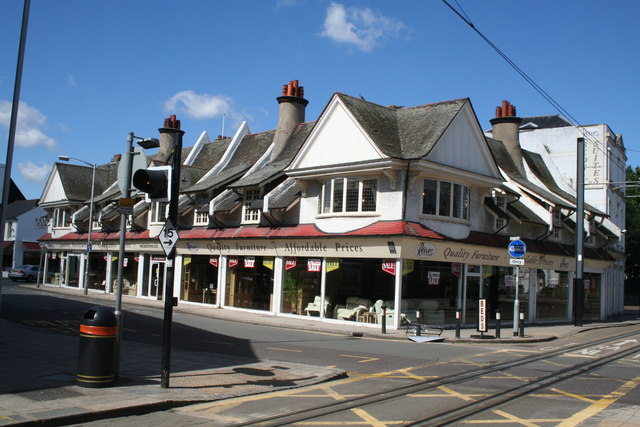
The northern buildings, photographed in 2008, and destroyed in 2011

== Premises ==
The complex of properties that make up the House of Reeves formerly lay on two principal sites, respectively to the north and south of Elis David Road (now Reeves Corner). Those to the south, which survive, lie within the Croydon Minster Conservation Area. They include a three-storey early eighteenth-century house at 120 Church Street (Edwin Reeves' original premises), which is Grade II listed, and a two-storey nineteenth-century building at 114–18 Church Street.

The properties on the northern side of Reeves Corner lay within the Church Street Conservation Area, and included a striking Edwardian Arts and Crafts building. These properties were destroyed in the 2011 arson attack.

== Reeves Corner ==
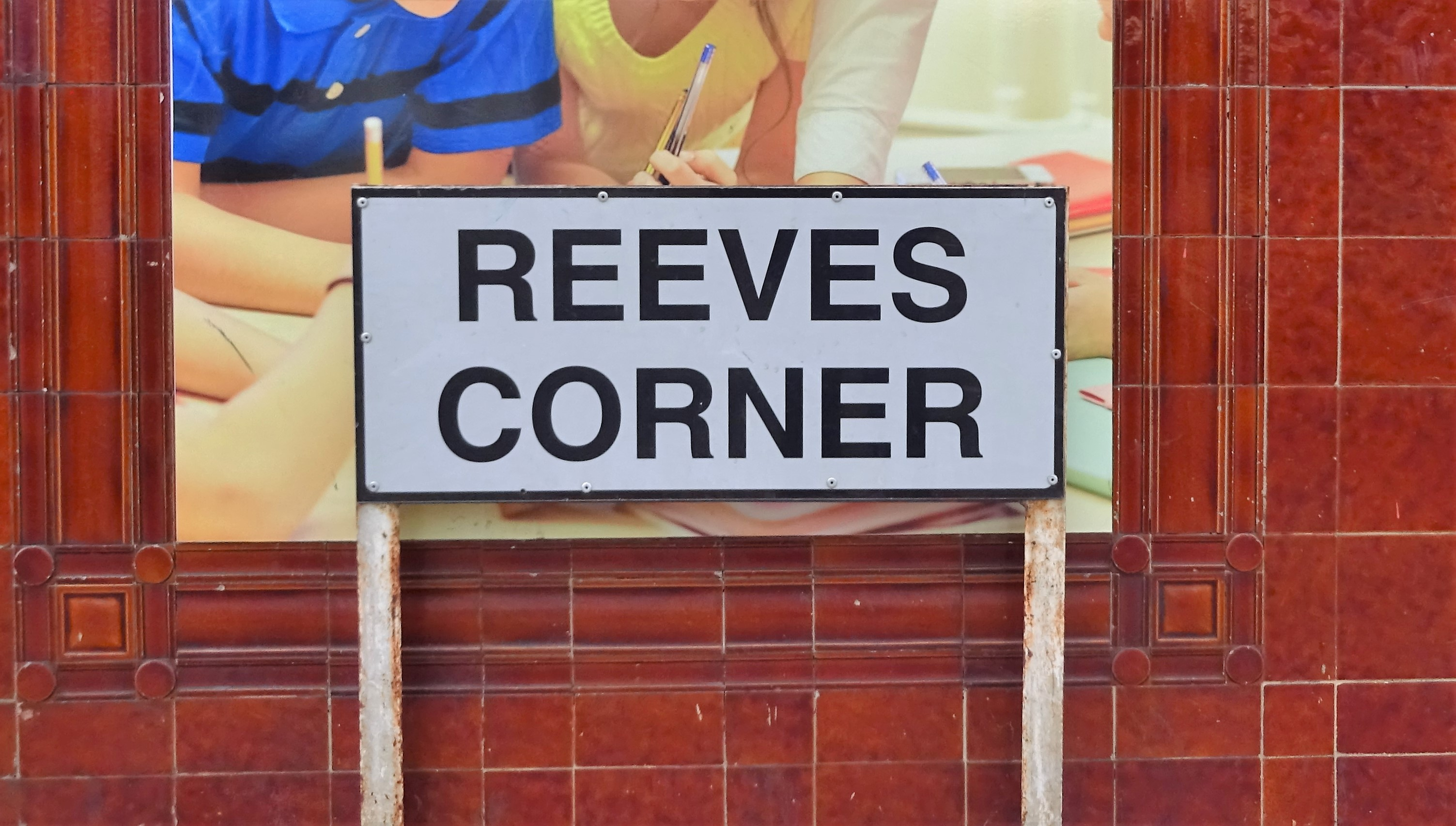
Reeves Corner street sign

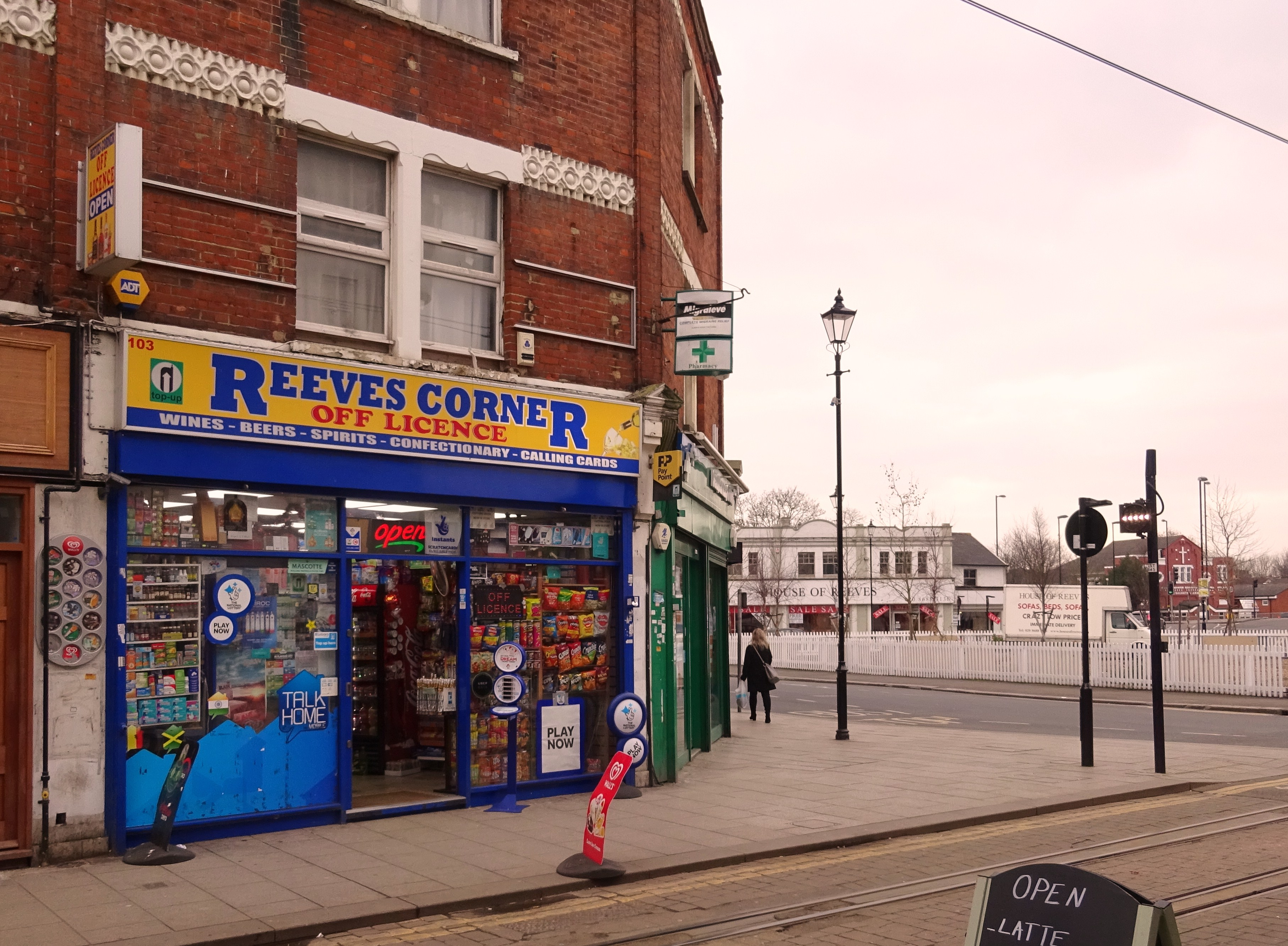
Reeves Corner Off Licence. The House of Reeves is visible in the background; the plot behind the picket fence is the site of the buildings destroyed in 2011.

The area of Croydon in which the shops were located (the junction of Church Street and Church Road) gradually acquired the informal name of "Reeves Corner", and in the late 1970s this name was formally assigned to part of a realigned street system (incorporating, and replacing the name of, Elis David Road). In 2000, the name was also given to the nearby Reeves Corner tram stop (in Cairo New Road) on the new Tramlink service.

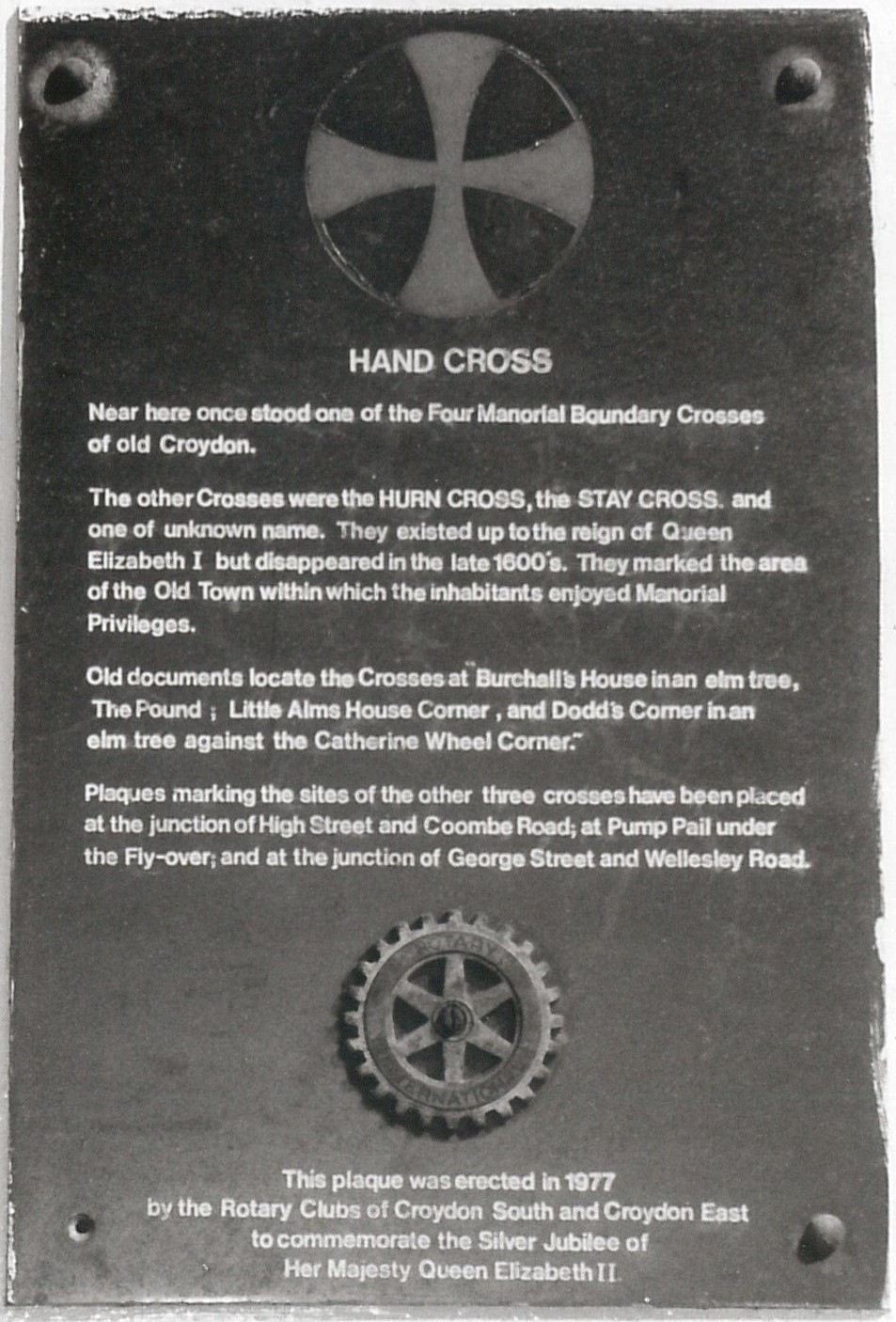
Plaque formerly on 110 Church Street marking the site of Hand Cross

A plaque formerly on 110 Church Street (part of the House of Reeves), erected in 1977 by the Croydon Rotary Clubs, commemorated the fact that Reeves Corner marked the location of the medieval and early modern Hand Cross. This was one of Croydon's "four crosses", boundary markers that defined the limits of the town, and within which the inhabitants enjoyed privileges including a degree of self-government and a form of free tenure of property. Another plaque was erected by the Croydon Society in 2001 to commemorate the 200th anniversary of the establishment of the pioneering Surrey Iron Railway (a horse-drawn plateway), of which the Pitlake terminus was close by. The buildings on which both these plaques were mounted were destroyed in the 2011 arson attack. The Surrey Iron Railway plaque was recovered from the rubble and subsequently re-erected on 114–16 Church Street; the Hand Cross plaque has never been found.

== Arson attack ==
One of the company's properties (to the north of Reeves Corner thoroughfare) was destroyed in an arson attack on 8 August 2011 during the 2011 England riots. Firefighters arrived too late to save the buildings because police had been unable to guarantee their safety from attack by rioters. Time magazine reported that the destruction of House of Reeves came to symbolize the violence that spread across England during the three days of rioting. Trevor Reeves said that the company, which employs 15 people, would remain in business. A group was set up on the Internet offering donations to help the store rebuild.

Police arrested a 21-year-old man two days after the fire on suspicion of arson with intent to endanger life, and later a 15-year-old and another 25-year-old male. On 13 August Gordon Thompson, aged 33, was arrested in Surrey Street after he was recognised from his picture on the front page of the Croydon Advertiser. He was charged on 14 August. During his trial in February 2012, he changed his plea to guilty at the end of the case for the prosecution. At the Old Bailey on 11 April 2012, Judge Peter Thornton sentenced Thompson to eleven years and six months in prison. Maurice Reeves subsequently stated that Thompson had apologised to the Reeves family for destroying their business, which the family accepted.

The surviving (southern) property was subsequently refurbished, and was the location of the company's 150th anniversary celebrations on 16 December 2017.

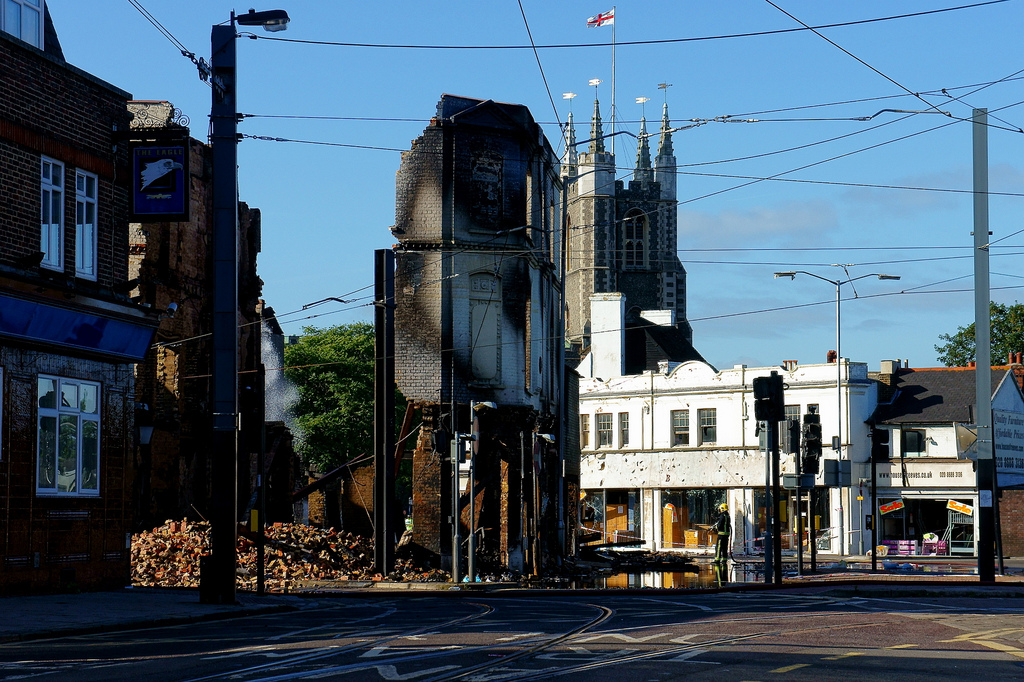
The burned-out store in August 2011

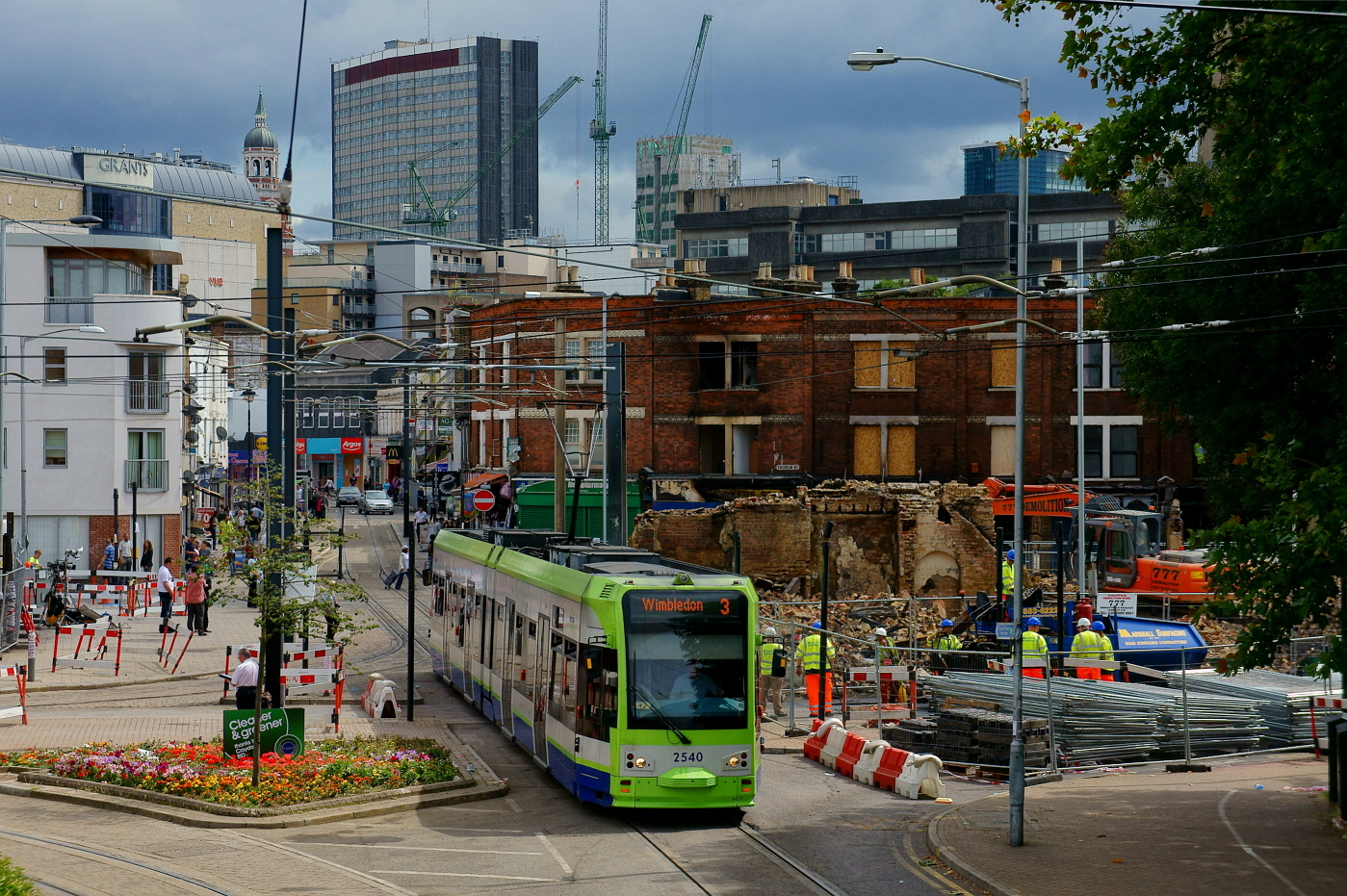
Tram near the ruins of the House of Reeves, four days after the fire

== Sources ==
- Huitson, Muriel; Gent, John B. (1988) [1970]. "Shopping and commerce: market town to modern city". In Gent, John B. (ed.). Croydon: the story of a hundred years (6th ed.). Croydon: Croydon Natural History & Scientific Society. pp. 24–8. ISBN 0-906047-02-1.
- McInnes, Paula; Sparkes, Bill (1991). One Hundred Years of Croydon at Work. Croydon: The Croydon Society/Croydon Chamber of Commerce and Industry. ISBN 0-9512713-3-4.
