= The Colonnades, Croydon =

Leisure park in Croydon, London, England

Coordinates: 51.356°N 0.115°W

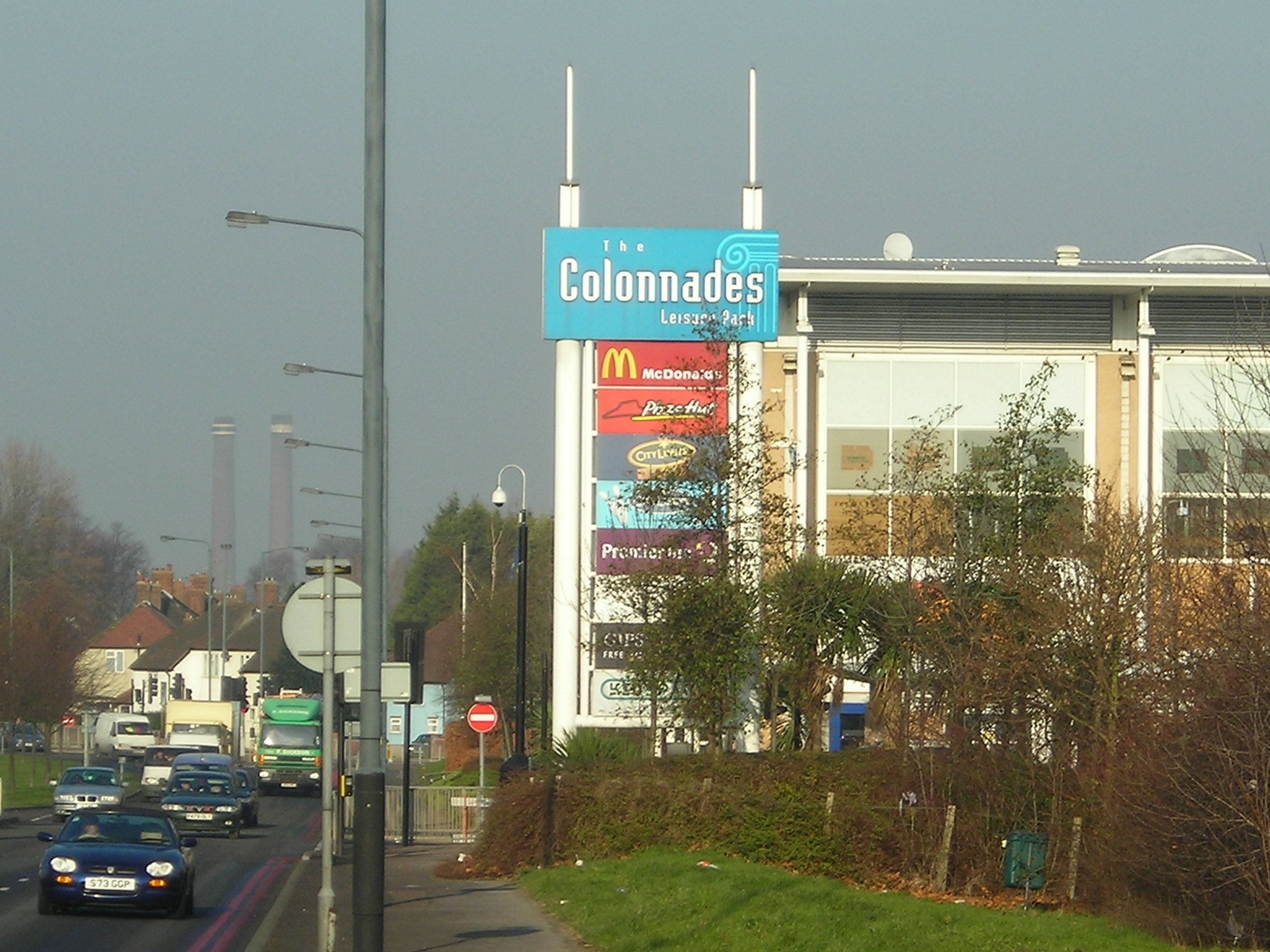
The Colonnades viewed from Purley Way looking north

The Colonnades is an out-of-town leisure park located in the Purley Way retail and industrial district of the London Borough of Croydon, South London. It opened in the late 1990s on the former site of the Croydon Water Palace, an indoor water park complex that operated from 1990 to 1996. It lies alongside the Purley Way Playing Fields, and opposite the former Croydon Airport site.

The site is currently owned and operated by Croydon Council who finally completed the purchase in August 2019 at a cost of more than £50m.

== Tenants ==
The Colonnades competes with the nearby Valley Retail and Leisure Park, a major commercial centre on Purley Way, but experiences less foot traffic due to the absence of a notable anchor tenant. Valley Park features IKEA, while the Purley Way Centre has Sainsbury's; however, The Colonnades positions itself as more of an entertainment complex than a shopping area. The retail park is the southernmost of the three on the A23 Purley Way, and is close to Purley town centre.

=== Former tenants ===
Many of the park's original attractions were entertainment-focused, such as City Limits, an indoor entertainment centre that included a restaurant, sports bar, arcade, and bowling alley. City Limits closed in the summer of 2010 after its lease was terminated by the owner, Punch Taverns. It is now split into two units, with one becoming a trampoline park and one becoming a branch of home-improvement chain Wickes.

Other original tenants included Gipsy Moth (a family pub which previously also housed a small Wacky Warehouse soft play), the food court which used to house Subway, BBQ Xpress, China Wok and Karahi Cuisine. The Gipsy Moth closed in December 2017 and the site was demolished in 2018 to make way for a new multi-outlet retail unit, and in early 2019 McDonald's and Nando's were confirmed as tenants of two of the units. McDonald's was previously situated next-door to the Kidspace indoor playground until it moved to its current spot.

=== Present-day tenants ===
In 2010, it was announced that the retail park would include the first drive-through Costa Coffee outlet. This opened in 2015.

On 2 October 2019 the complex mentioned plans to open a new KFC restaurant, occupied in the 3 restaurants in the second unit. This opened in late October 2019.

Current tenants of the site include Pizza Hut, McDonald's, Premier Inn, Nando's, a Kidspace indoor adventure playground, an Oxygen trampoline park, Wickes and a Nuffield Health & Fitness Centre. T.G.I. Friday's had a restaurant located across the road from the retail area, which closed in October 2024 following the UK brand being put into administration, as well as a Hilton Hotel.
