= Croydon power stations =

Group of former power stations in Croydon, London, England

Croydon Power Stations
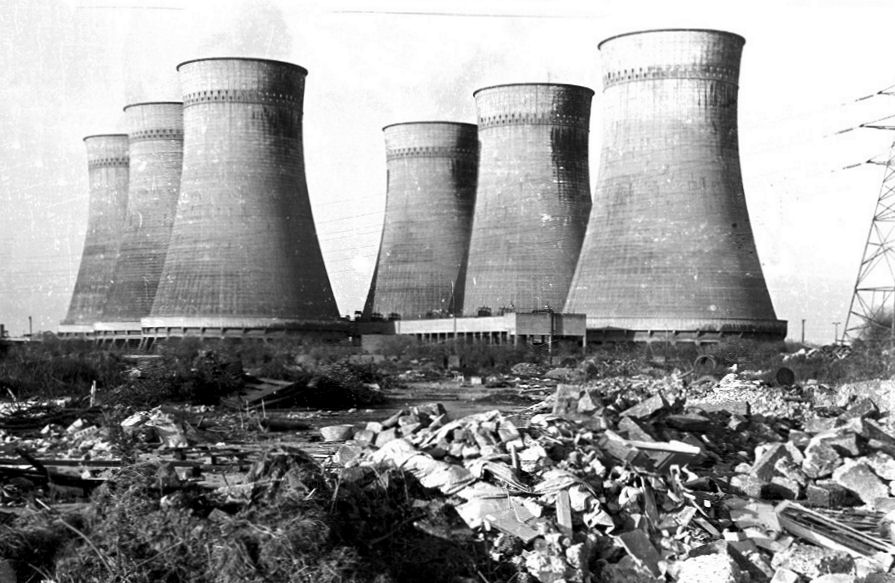
- Croydon B power station's cooling towers in 1973
- Country: England
- Location: Croydon, Greater London
- Coordinates: 51°22′44″N 0°07′16″W
- Status: A & B: Decommissioned and demolished
- Commission date: A: 1896, B: 1950, Gas turbine: 2005
- Decommission date: A: 1973, B: 1983
- Owner: As operator
- Operators: Croydon Corporation (1896–1948); British Electricity Authority (1948–1955); Central Electricity Authority (1955–1957); Central Electricity Generating Board (1958–1983); Gas Turbine: Rolls-Royce Power Developments Ltd

Thermal power station
- Primary fuel: Coal, Gas turbine: natural gas
- Chimneys: B: 2 (extant)
- Cooling towers: A: wooden towers plus 2 concrete, B: 6 parabolic concrete
- Cooling source: Recirculating water

Power generation
- Units operational: A: 1 × 30 MW; B: 4 × 52.5 MW plus 2 × 70 MW gas turbines; Gas turbine: 1 × 50 MW
- Make and model: Gas turbine Rolls-Royce Trent
- Units decommissioned: A & B All
- Nameplate capacity: Gas turbine 50 MW
- Annual net output: (See graphs below)

External links
- Commons: Related media on Commons

The Croydon power stations refers to a pair of demolished coal-fired power stations and to a gas-fired power station in the Purley Way area of Croydon, London.

The coal-fired stations operated from 1896 until 1984, and the gas-fired station opened in 2005. Croydon B power station's chimneys have been retained as a local landmark.

Although outside the borough, Beddington Energy Recycling Facility has been included for completeness. Croydon has a long history with the Beddington Sewage Farm, and is a member of the South London Waste Partnership.

== History ==
=== Croydon A ===
The first power station built on the site, which would later become known as Croydon A power station, was opened in 1896. The station was designed by Sir Alexander Kennedy and built near Croydon Gas Works by the Croydon Corporation. Three 120 kW alternating current (AC) generators were installed by British Thomson Houston. Rotating at 360 rpm the 20 pole alternators generated an alternating current at the American standard of 60 Hz. A condition of the contract was that British Thomson Houston would initially run the power station, whose resident engineer was A. L. C. Fell. His chief assistant Charles Merz took over a year later, and in 1925–6 was consulted for Britain's National Grid as a pioneer of transmission systems. The corporation took over the operation in 1898 and appointed Mr T H Minshall as their chief engineer.

The electricity was distributed at 2,000 V to five substations, which dropped the voltage down to 200 V. Initially the electricity supplied a small compulsory area of about 1/2 sq mi (1.3 km^{2}), composed mainly of shops and businesses. Street lighting was also provided by 50 arc lights fed directly from the generating station after rectification to direct current (DC). The standards (lamp-posts) for the arc lights were cast and installed by the local Waddon firm Wenham and Waters Ltd, who also won the contract to light Croydon's Municipal Building (Town Hall), which opened the same year.

By 1901 the station contained two 250 kW and two 500 kW BTH Belliss steam alternators the generated power had increased to over 1.8 MW, now distributed via 26 substations to supply an area of about 12 sq mi (31 km^{2}) to its nearly 800 customers. To reduce transmission losses, electricity was transmitted at 5,000 V to outlying districts and AC was used there for street lighting. Additionally, power for Croydon Corporation tram system was supplied from two 300 kW direct current sets by the Electric Construction Company, coupled to Belliss engines.

The generating equipment at the station was replaced in 1924, when low pressure equipment of 21 megawatts (MW) and high pressure equipment of 29 MW was installed, giving the station a generating capacity of 50 MW. In 1927 Croydon Corporation adopted the standard supply of 230V AC and in 1928 placed a contract for two additional wooden cooling towers. The first 195 ft (59 m) hyperbolic concrete tower was built in 1930, followed by another in 1933 A 1947 aerial photograph shows the power station with seven wooden and three hyperbolic concrete cooling towers.

The site had expanded from its origins on the north side of Factory Lane (51.377328°N 0.112372°W) to the south side (51.376524°N 0.113645°W), extending to Wandle Park in the south and the Croydon and Wimbledon railway, to the west that brought coal to the power station. This corresponded with the arrival of English Electric Type 3B locomotive No.692 (a steeplecab design built in 1925) which used an overhead wire electric system, for the shunting of coal. In 1959 this was supplemented with a backup steam locomotive from Littlebrook Power Station, built by W. G. Bagnall in 1946.

Following nationalisation in 1947 the power station was owned by the British Energy Authority, who subsequently opened a new power station (Croydon B) across the Purley Way (51.380447°N 0.123177°W).

In 1970, Croydon A was rarely active and was one of the few power stations in the country to still have wooden cooling towers on site but two concrete towers were in use at time of closure. It operated until 1973. The two towers closest to the railway were demolished in 1974 by a controlled explosion, but the third tower had to be demolished by hand because it was considered too close to nearby houses.

The generating capacity, maximum load, and electricity generated and sold was as follows:

Croydon A generating capacity, load and electricity produced and sold, 1912–46
| Year | Generating capacity, MW | Maximum load, MW | Electricity generated, GWh | Electricity sold, GWh |
|---|---|---|---|---|
| 1912/3 | 5.45 | 3.804 | 8.687 | 7.069 |
| 1918/9 | 6.250 | 3.900 | 11.080 | 8.859 |
| 1919/20 | 6.65 | 5.361 | 12.800 | 10.139 |
| 1923/4 | 14.75 | 8.60 | 19.422 | 14.947 |
| 1936/7 | 58.00 | 38.78 | 186.305 | 112.484 |
| 1946 | | 73.3 | 238.375 | 224.757 |

==== Technical specification ====
In 1923, the AC plant comprised: 1 × 3,000 kW and 2 × 5,000 kW turbo-alternators. The DC supply was generated by 1 × 750 kW and 1 × 1,000 kW reciprocating engines and generators. The total installed generating capacity was 14,750 kW. The boiler plant produced a total of 101,000 lb/hr (12.73 kg/s) of steam. A range of currents and voltages was available:

- 3-phase AC 230 & 400 V
- 1-phase AC 200 & 400 V
- DC 230 & 460 V
- DC traction current 550 V

In 1923, the station generated 16.555 GWh of electricity, some of this was used in the plant, the total amount sold was 12.593 GWh. The revenue from sales of current was £166,345, this gave a surplus of revenue over expenses of £98,742.

By 1963–64, the A station had 1 × 30 MW generator. The steam capacity of the boilers was 775,000 lb/hr (97.6 kg/s). The steam conditions at the turbine stop valve were 265 / 490 psi (18.3 / 33.8 bar) and 416 / 427 °C. The overall thermal efficiency of the A station in 1963-64 was 15.33 per cent.

Electricity output from Croydon A power station during its final years of operation was as follows.

Croydon A annual electricity output GWh

=== Croydon B ===
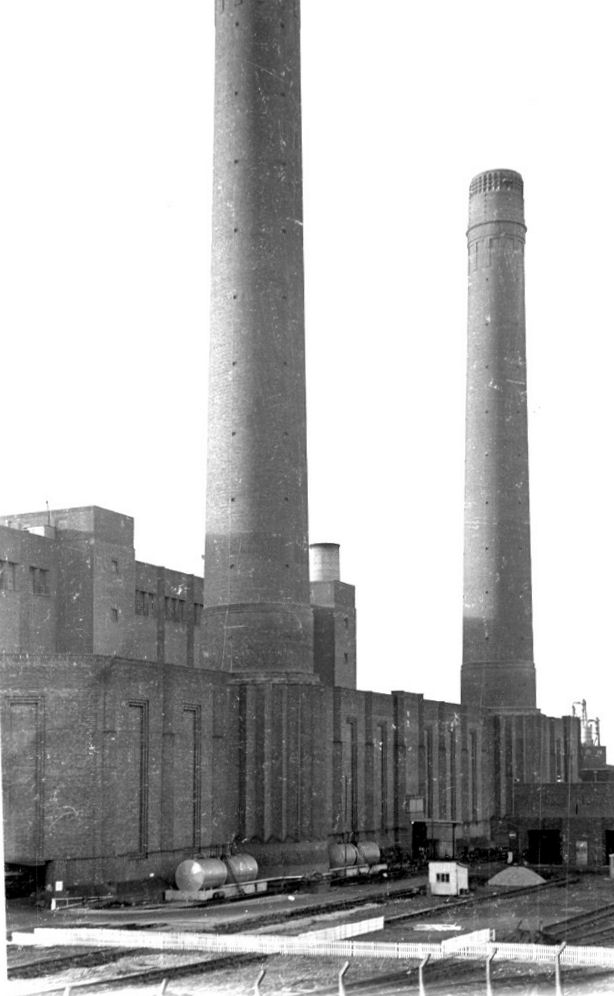
Croydon B Power Station, 1973

Planning for a Croydon B power station was begun in 1939, with the architecture designed by Robert Atkinson. However, these plans were delayed by World War II. Immediately after the end of the war, construction work began on the new station. The station was built by Sir Robert McAlpine & Sons, who also used two locomotives during the construction work; the first was Hudswell Clarke No.82, used between 1946 and 1948, the second was Hudswell Clarke No.55, used for the remainder of 1948. Two 300 ft (91 m) chimneys had been built by 1949 and construction had begun on three cooling towers in 1948. Work had started on the sixth in 1949. The station was finally opened in September 1950 when the first unit was commissioned the second unit followed in December 1950.

Sewage water from the Beddington sewage farm was used to cool the steam, as it had been done at Croydon A since the 1930s. A white sludge built up in the condensers, which had to be manually removed once a month and descaled three or four times a year with acid. The sewage water was fed through a sand filter that reduced the particulates from 100ppm to less than 20ppm, but had little effect on the sludge. The white sludge was mainly calcium phosphate precipitating out in the cooling water. After much work and several years, it was discovered that this could be prevented by making the water more acidic. Chlorine was used because it was relatively cheap, did not cause other salts to be precipitated, and killed biological microorganisms.

The station originally had a generating capacity of 198 MW, but in 1972, a 140 MW gas turbine was installed for peak use, bringing the generating capacity up to 338 MW. The oil-fired gas turbine plant comprised two 70 MW sets with a total capability of 140 MW. These were operated as required at times of peak load. The load factor (the average load as a percentage of the average maximum output capacity) for these machines were generally below 5 per cent.

Once delivered to the station, coal was shunted by locomotives. Croydon B had a fleet of three shunting locomotives, all built by Peckett and Sons with the works numbers No.2103, No.2104 and No.2105. These three steam locomotives were superseded by diesels in the 1960s.

Coal was brought to the station by rail, but during the 1970s coal was sometimes shipped down the coast from Northumberland to Kingsnorth and then transported to Croydon in up to twenty-five 10 ton lorries per day.

It was decommissioned in 1984, and in a disused state was used in the filming of parts of Terry Gilliam's 1985 film Brazil. The station was demolished in 1991 and an IKEA store was opened on the site. The two large chimneys were retained: they are now capped with blue and yellow bands (IKEA's corporate colours), and remain a local landmark. The six cooling towers were demolished in 1985.

==== Technical specification ====
By 1963–64, the B station had 4 × 52.5 MW Metropolitan-Vickers generators. The steam capacity of the boilers was 2,560,000 lb/hr (322.6 kg/s). Steam conditions at the turbine stop valve were 600 psi (41.4 bar) and 454 °C. In 1963–64, the overall thermal efficiency of the B station was 24.58 per cent.

The two gas turbines were each powered by four Bristol-Siddeley Olympus jet engines. These provided a high pressure gas blast which drove the turbines attached to a Parsons 70 MW, 11 kV alternator.

Electricity output from Croydon B power station during its final years of operation was as follows.

Croydon B annual electricity output GWh

Electricity output from Croydon B Gas Turbine plant was as follows.

Croydon B Gas Turbine plant annual electricity output GWh

=== Gas-fired station ===
The industry had been privatised in 1989, and in 1999 the secretary of state for trade and industry, Stephen Byers declined to object to a gas-fired power station at Croydon, stating diversity and security needs. At just under 50MW formal consent under section 36 of the Electricity Act 1989 was not required. It was built on part of the old gasworks site, near today's Waddon Marsh tram-stop that had become British Gas property (51.37644°N 0.11637°W).

The gas turbine station started operation in 2005. It was owned by Rolls-Royce Power Developments Ltd and was initially operated by Rolls-Royce Energy. It consists of an open cycle gas turbine (OCGT), a Rolls-Royce Trent engine, and generates 50 MW of electricity. The engine operates on gas at a pressure of 19 bar; the thermal efficiency is about 36 per cent. The machine is used at peak time of demand and runs less than 1000 hours per annum. In 2020, the Environment Agency limited the OCGT to an average of less than 1,500 hours per annum over a rolling 5-year period, and no more than 2,250 in a single year.

In 2009, there was a proposal to use the waste heat from the gas turbine exhaust gases to operate a 35 MW combined heat and power (CHP) system delivering hot water to a district heating system. This would be achieved by taking heat from the exhaust gases at 444 °C and cooling them to 180 °C, using a finned tube heat exchanger.

In 2019, Rockwell Capital announced that it had acquired 100% of White Tower Energy, formerly Rolls-Royce Power Developments Ltd including its 5 natural gas power stations. As of 2020, the gas turbine station is being operated by RWE on behalf of its customer.

=== Beddington Energy Recycling Facility ===
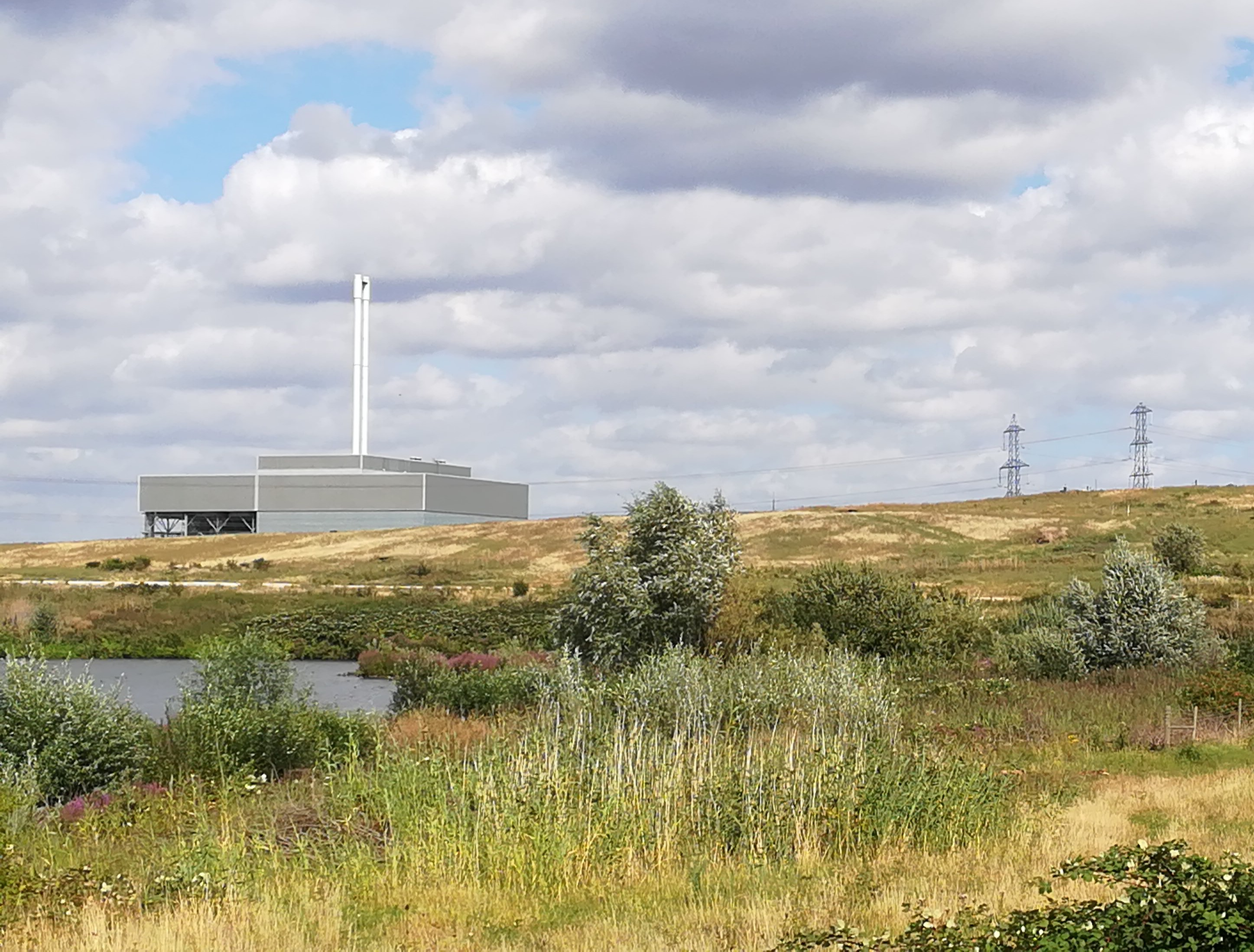
Beddington Energy Recycling Facility

The 25 MW Beddington Energy Recycling Facility (51.386048°N 0.144148°W) was started in 2015 and opened in 2019 at a cost of around £210M. The construction was started in 2016 and completed in 2017 with Lagan Construction and its subcontractors. It was built towards the north east corner of Beddington Farmlands that until December 2022 was used for landfill.

Viridor has a 25-year contract with the South London Waste Partnership, a collaboration between Croydon, Kingston, Merton and Sutton councils to burn non-hazardous residual waste to power a steam turbine and generator. The spent steam is condensed by air and recycled, while the exhaust combustion gases are filtered to remove particulates, nitrous oxide, acid gases (e.g. CO_{2}) and adsorb heavy metals, dioxins, furans and volatile organic compounds before being released into the atmosphere. The ash is used for road fill after removing any metal.

== The Valley Park Retail and Leisure Complex ==
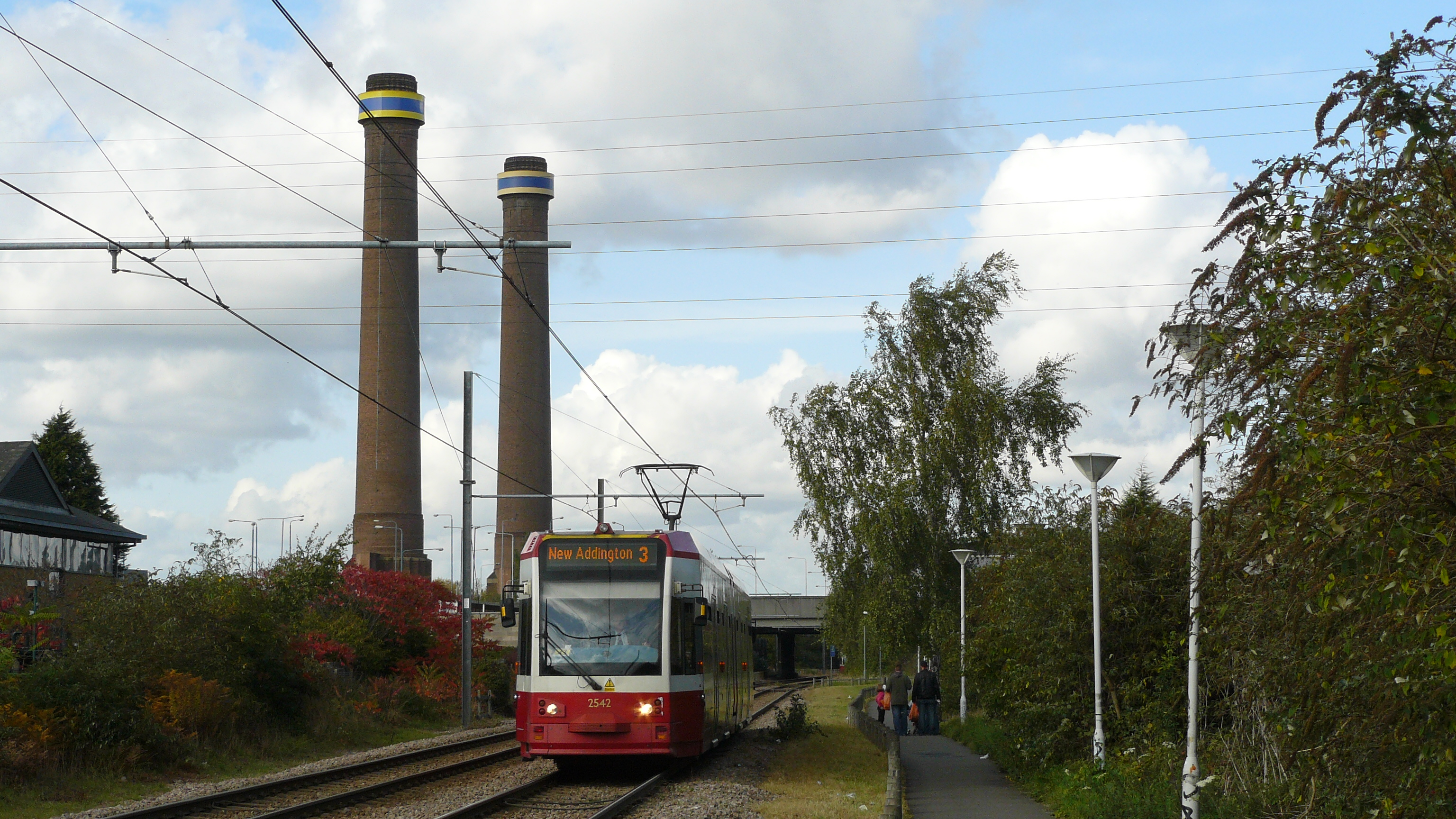
Croydon B's chimneys in 2008

In 1992, the area was regenerated into what is now known as the Valley Park Retail and Leisure Complex.
