= Croydon Water Palace =

Former indoor water park in London, England

Coordinates: 51.356°N 0.115°W

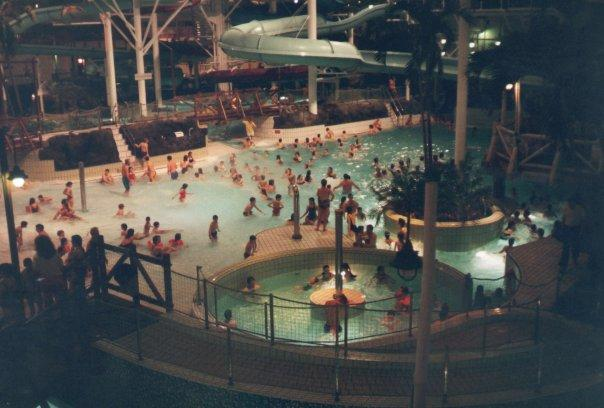
Water Palace, Purley Way, Croydon 1990–1996

The Croydon Water Palace was an indoor water park complex that opened in 1990 by the Purley Way in Waddon in the London Borough of Croydon, opposite Croydon Airport. It featured four water slides, a large jacuzzi area, a lazy river and a wave pool using an artificial wave-making machine. There was also an on-site café. It was part of the Purley Way retail development drive that occurred in the early 1990s, which also saw the creation of the Valley Park Retail Area.

The Water Palace experienced continuous financial difficulties, and finally closed in 1996. Throughout its lifespan, the Water Palace was renowned for poor health and safety, and several accidents were publicised in the local press, although these were not the direct reasons for its closure.

After closure, the site was sold for nearly £24m. It was then redeveloped in the late 1990s to become the Colonnades Leisure Park.
