= Purley Way =

Street in the London Borough of Croydon

Coordinates: 51°22′45″N 0°07′16″W

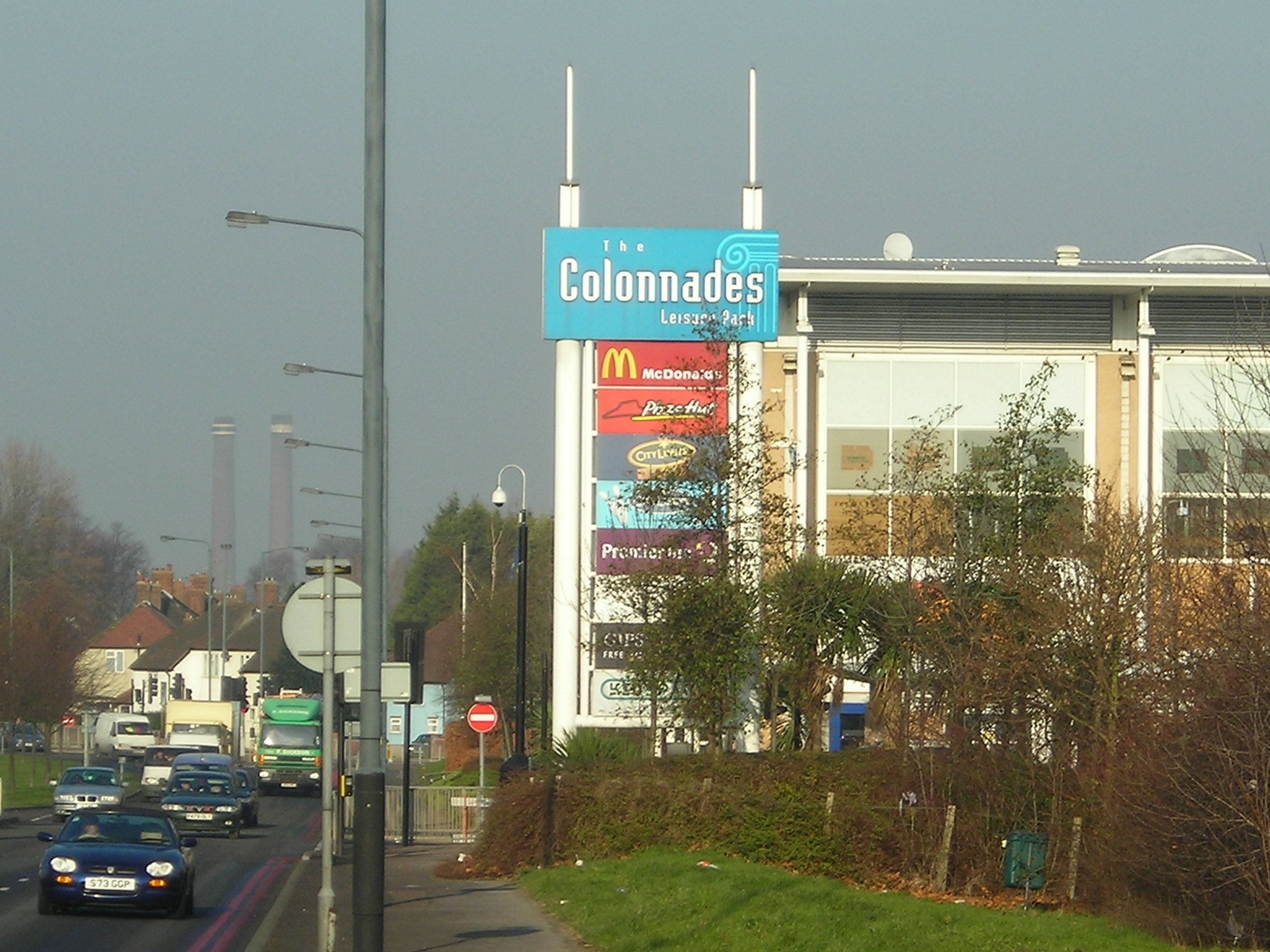
The Croydon Colonnades on Purley Way

Purley Way is a section of the A23 trunk road in the London Borough of Croydon, in the areas of Purley, Waddon and Broad Green, and has given its name to the out-of-town shopping area alongside it with a catchment area covering most of South London.

It was designed as a bypass for Croydon, and opened in April 1925. It was formed from improvements to pre existing local roads: from north to south, Waddon Marsh Lane, Waddon Court Road and Coldharbour Lane. (Thornton Road, the northern section of the bypass, was not renamed.) In 1932, Purley Way became the first road in the United Kingdom to be lit with sodium lights.

== Industrial history ==
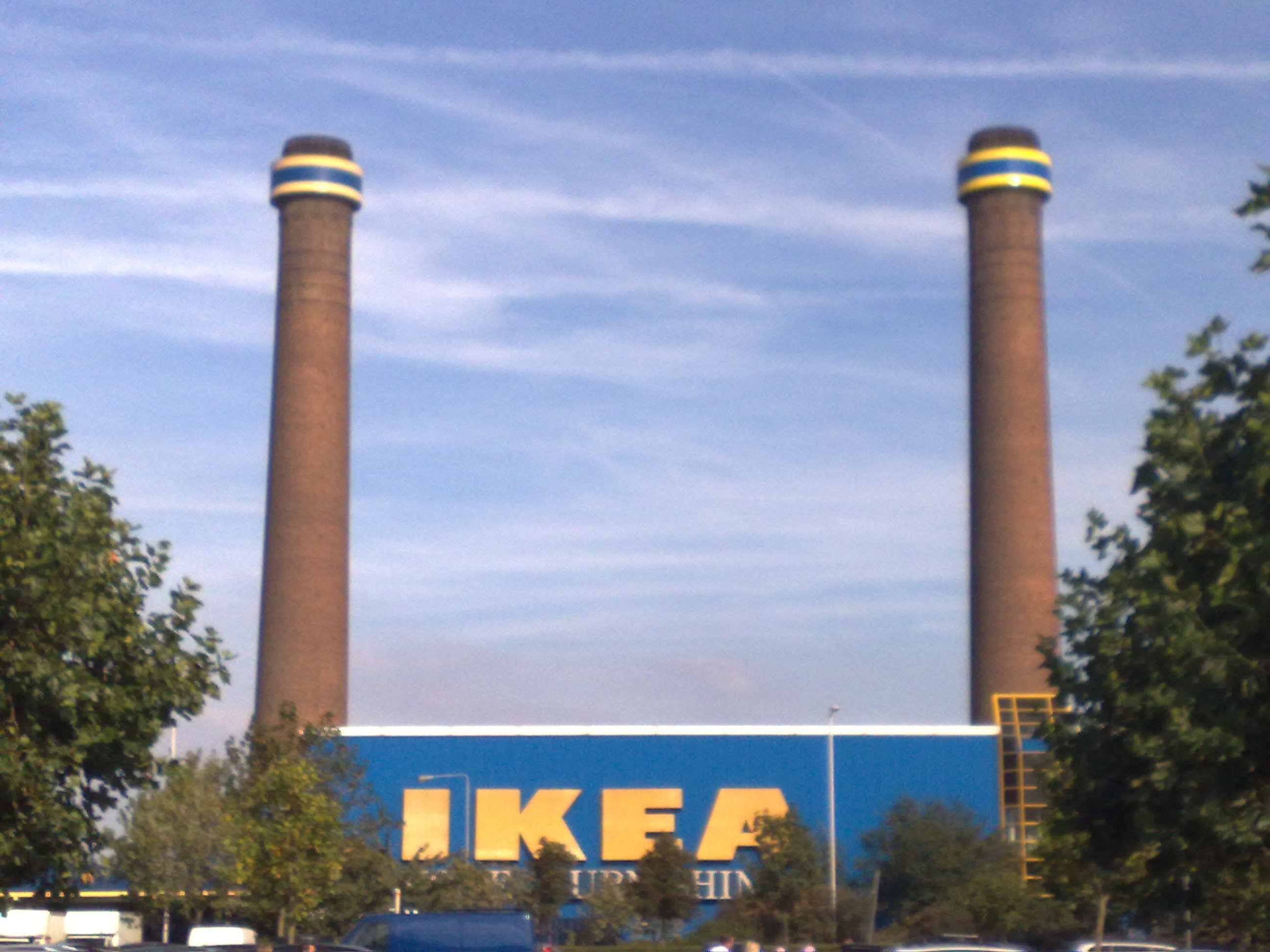
The IKEA on Purley Way was built on the site of a power station, and retains its chimneys

The opening of Purley Way attracted industry to the area and it became the main industrial area of Croydon. Industry attracted to the area included Redwing Aircraft Ltd, Trojan Ltd (car manufacturers) and Tizer Ltd. There were also several metal companies including Standard Steel Co, Croydon Foundry Ltd, Metal Propellers Ltd and Southern Foundries Ltd.

Croydon "B" Power Station, with architecture designed by Robert Atkinson, was built in the end of the 1940s and opened in 1950. It shut down in 1984, was demolished in 1991, and an IKEA was opened on its site. Its immediate surroundings were developed as the Valley Park Retail and Leisure Complex. The large chimneys of the power station were retained as a local landmark, which can be seen from Central Croydon's Centrale Shopping Centre.

Croydon "A" power station and the Croydon Gas Works were also on the Purley Way. The cooling towers of the gas works were huge, and featured in films including Terry Gilliam's Brazil (1985).

Croydon Airport (operational 1928–1959) was also located on Purley Way.

== Retail history ==
In the early 1980s, retail warehouses began to appear on the Purley Way. The first opened on the Thornton Road Industrial Estate: the Queensway furniture store in 1980, MFI Furniture in 1981, Payless DIY in 1983, and Do It All in 1986. In March 1981, Sainsbury's opened the first Homebase on Purley Way. In November 1991, Vision Technology Group Ltd opened the first PC World on Purley Way.

Several distinct retail parks are now found along the length of the Purley Way, including Valley Park Retail and Leisure Complex, Croydon Fiveways and Colonnades Leisure Park. The development of the area for retail purposes was not the result of local planning guidance, but occurred as part of a national trend towards out of town shopping. The retail parks were not formally recognised by Croydon Council until the publication of its 1997 Unitary Development Plan.

=== IKEA Croydon ===
The IKEA in Croydon is a 23,000 m^{2} furniture store which opened in 1992, on the site of Croydon "B" Power Station. The old power station chimneys, with the addition of illuminated bands in the store's blue and yellow colours, were retained as a prominent advertisement. The store was revamped during 2006, to make it the largest IKEA in Britain: it was re launched in May 2006, at a ceremony attended by Mayor Maggie Mansell, and the ambassador of Sweden, Stefan Karlsson.

IKEA is now the fifth biggest single employer in Croydon. The landmark chimneys have been a continuing point of contention with local residents. In September 2003, IKEA briefly considered demolishing them, stating that they cost over £70,000 a year to maintain, but decided against it. Ideas that have been aired for their use have included incorporating a museum of the site's history, and constructing a revolving restaurant at the top.

Tony Blair and Gordon Brown visited IKEA on 5 May 2005, during the General Election campaign.

== Other information ==
Purley Way Lido operated from 1935 to 1979; the diving board remains in the middle of a garden centre (which is now closed). The Croydon Water Palace, an indoor water park complex, operated nearby from 1990 to 1996. The site of the Water Palace is now occupied by Colonnades Leisure Park. In the past, there has been a depository for the Science Museum in the Retail Park area, and Tramlink passes Purley Way.
