= Beddington Farmlands =

Open space in Greater London, England

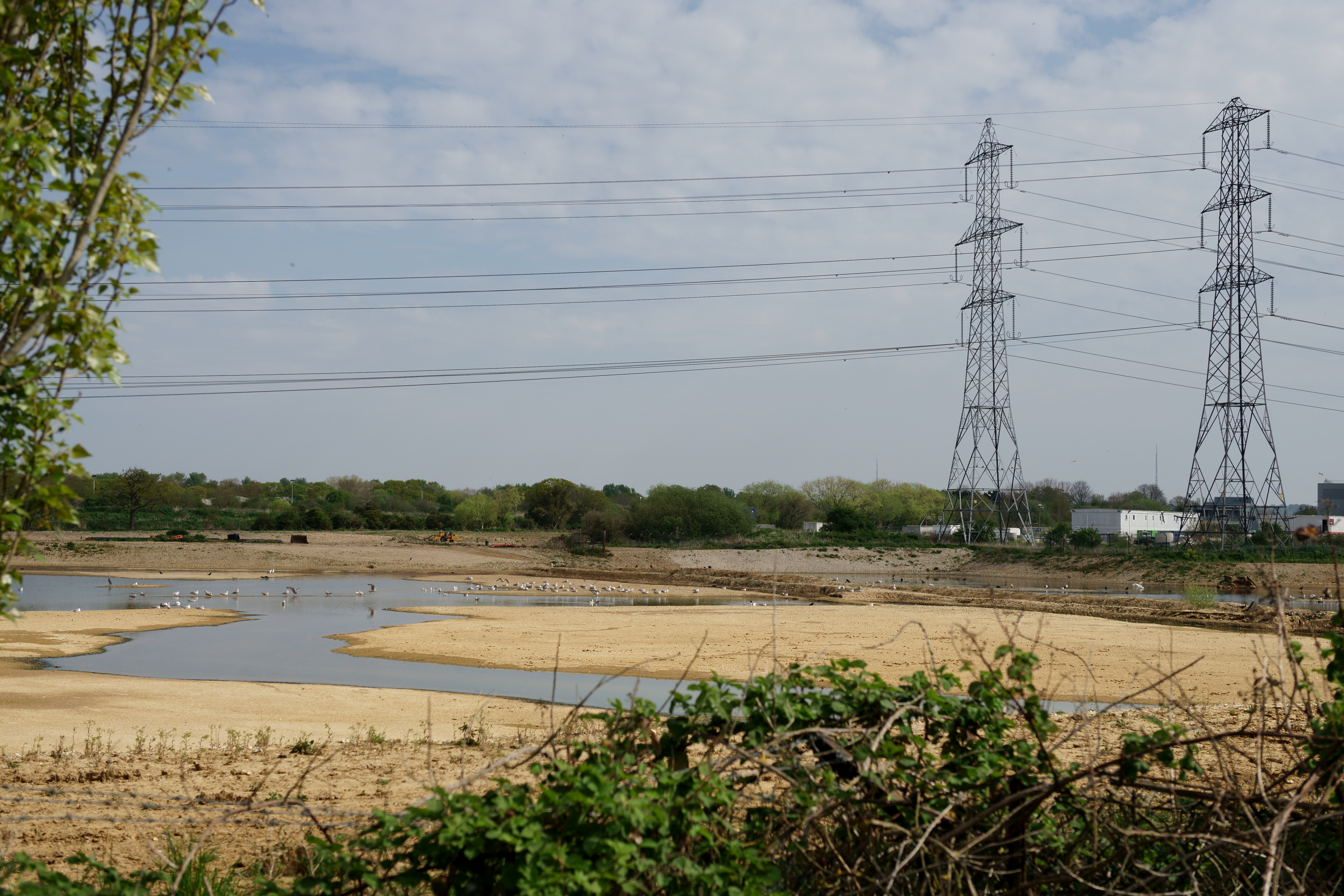

- Location within Greater London
- Interactive map of Beddington Farmlands
- Location: Beddington, Greater London
- Coordinates: 51.3809°N 0.1507°W
- Area: 161 hectares (400 acres)
- Website: http://bfnr.org.uk/

Beddington Farmlands is an area adjacent to Beddington in Greater London, England, known for many years as a birdwatching site. It is being developed as a nature reserve.

== History ==
It has been a birdwatching site since the late 19th century.

During this time, land use has changed with increasing urbanisation of the surrounding area. In the late 19th century the land consisted of ploughed fields and marshy fields, and there was sewage disposal in the form of land fertilisation. From the 1940s there was more open field sewage treatment, and in 1969 a sewage treatment works was opened on part of the Farm. In the 1970s the wet meadows were replaced by sludge beds. Gravel extraction began in 1998.

Ornithological records, increasing from the 1930s, have been kept over this period. They show details of the changes in the range of species seen, and size of bird population, as the land use has changed.

== Nature reserve ==
Beddington Farmlands is classified a Site of Importance for Nature Conservation, and a Metropolitan Open Land. Its area is 161 hectares (400 acres). Wildlife habitats are being developed, including wet grasslands, lakes and heathland. There is restricted access to the reserve until completion.

It is part of the developing Wandle Valley Regional Park, set up as a charity in 2013. This is a series of green spaces along the entire length of the River Wandle, including, adjacent to Beddington Farmlands, Mitcham Common to the north and Beddington Park to the south.
