= Valley Retail and Leisure Park =

Coordinates: 51°22′50″N 0°07′23″W

Valley Retail & Leisure Park

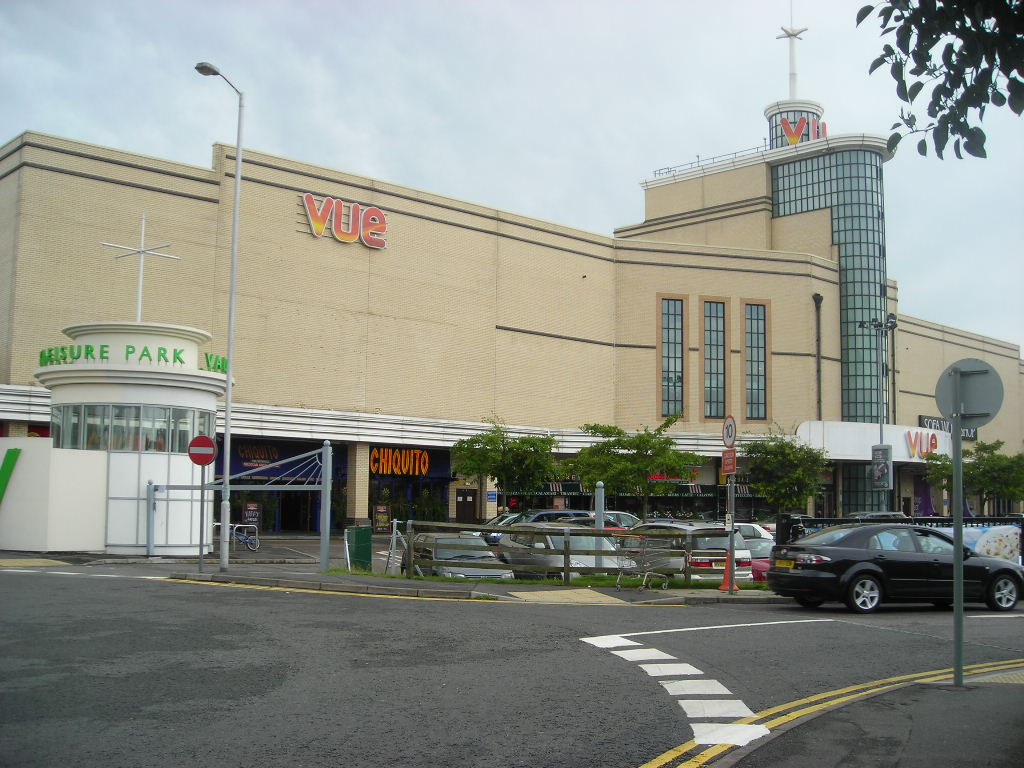
The Vue cinema inside the Leisure Park

Valley Retail and Leisure Park is a retail park in the Purley Way retail and industrial area in Croydon, England. It is located near the Broad Green and Waddon areas of the London Borough of Croydon. Valley Park was opened in 1992 on the site of the former Croydon power stations, the first of which was built in the late nineteenth century. Croydon B power station was closed in 1984 and the majority of the site cleared in 1991. However the local council ordered the station's landmark chimneys be retained, which almost put IKEA off the site, but a compromise was made that IKEA could paint the top skirt of the tower in their colours (blue and yellow).

== Structure and stores ==
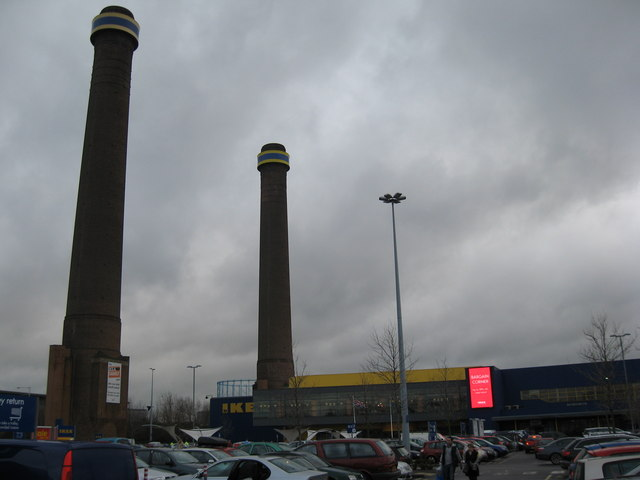
The towers of Ikea

The retail park is divided into two areas: one includes larger retail units with a large car park; the other is a long, large modern building which houses the entertainment and leisure area and a small parking area.

=== Retail area ===
A short-lived warehouse club called Cargo Club opened in March 1994. Cargo Club in Croydon was one of three stores in the UK and was owned by Cash and Carry company, Nurdin and Peacock with the aim of selling mainly to the general public rather than newsagents and convenience stores like their cash and carry depots do. Similar nearby warehouse clubs were Makro (Opened in April 1982) and Costco which opened at around the same time as Cargo Club. Ultimately the idea failed to get enough members to pay an annual fee and the company lost money. Nurdin and Peacock were to sell their stores to Sainsbury's as SavaCentre stores but instead this store was sold to a development company who split it into different stores with DFS as the main anchor store. Valley Park Retail park was completed in 1996.

- The area near B&Q contained two shops Boots and Sports Direct.
- The area beside Ikea contained three shops Outfit, Next and Mothercare (all closed in 2020, Next replaced by Fabb Furniture, and Mothercare replaced with JD Sports)
- The area beside Ikea contains a DFS, Dunelm and Tapi Carpets
- The restaurants host a PizzaExpress, Nando's, Bella Italia, Five Guys, Wingstop, Cream's Café, JRC Global Buffet (previously Cosmo's) a Burger King and a McDonald's drive-through.

=== Leisure park ===
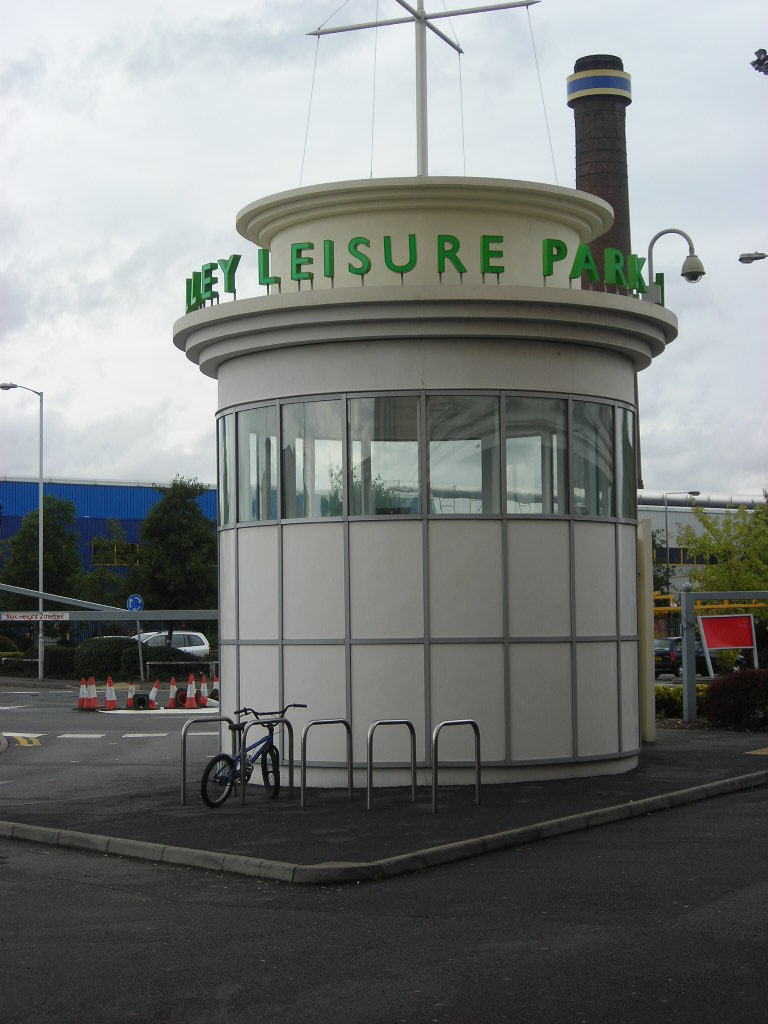
Valley Leisure Park

The leisure park is located behind the IKEA and retail areas and opened in late 1995/early 1996 with Megabowl and Ritz Bingo Hall. Facilities include a Vue cinema, restaurants, a gym, and Tenpin, a 25 lane bowling alley, complete with games arcade.

== Transport ==
The retail park is served by Ampere Way Tramlink stop. Bus routes S4 and 463 serve it directly, and route 289 runs nearby on the Purley Way.
