= All Saints Church =

All Saints Church, or All Saints' Church or variations on the name may refer to:

== Germany ==
- Allerheiligen-Hofkirche, Munich, Bavaria
- Kreuzkirche, Munich, Bavaria
- All Saints Church, Dresden, Saxony
- All Saints' Church, Leipzig, Saxony
- All Saints' Church, Wittenberg, Saxony-Anhalt
- All Saints' Church, Erfurt, Thuringia

== India ==
- All Saint's Church, Jaipur, designed by Samuel Swinton Jacob
- All Saints Church, Pune
- All Saints Church, Secunderabad
- All Saints Church, Srinagar

== Ireland ==
- All Saints Church, Carnew, County Wicklow
- All Saints Church, Grangegorman, Dublin
- All Saints' Church, Raheny, Dublin

== New Zealand ==
- All Saints' Church, Dunedin
- All Saints' Church, Hokitika
- All Saints Church, Howick, Auckland
- All Saints' Church, Palmerston North

== United Kingdom ==
=== England ===
==== Bedfordshire ====
- Church of All Saints, Campton
- Church of All Saints, Houghton Regis
- Church of All Saints, Leighton Buzzard
- Church of All Saints, Odell, Bedfordshire

==== Berkshire ====
- All Saints Church, Farnborough
- All Saints' Church, Maidenhead
- All Saints' Church, Reading

==== Bristol ====
- All Saints' Church, Bristol

==== Buckinghamshire ====
- All Saints' Church, Bow Brickhill, Milton Keynes
- All Saints Church, High Wycombe
- All Saints Church, Lathbury, Milton Keynes
- All Saints Church, Loughton, Milton Keynes
- All Saints' Church, Wing, Aylesbury Vale

==== Cambridgeshire ====
- All Saints' Church, Cambridge
- All Saints Church, Conington
- All Saints Church, Lolworth

==== Cornwall ====
- All Saints' Church, Bryher
- All Saints Church, Marazion

==== Cheshire ====
- All Saints Church, Church Lawton
- All Saints' Church, Daresbury
- St Mary and All Saints' Church, Great Budworth
- All Saints Church, Great Saughall
- All Saints Church, Handley
- All Saints Church, Harthill
- All Saints' Church, Hoole, Chester
- All Saints Church, Marple
- All Saints' Church, Runcorn
- All Saints Church, Scholar Green
- All Saints Church, Siddington
- All Saints Chapel, Somerford
- All Saints Church, Thelwall
- All Saints' Church, Weston, Cheshire

==== Cumbria ====
- All Saints Church, Bolton
- All Saints Church, Boltongate
- All Saints Church, Burton in Lonsdale
- All Saints Church, Orton
- All Saints Church, Lupton
- All Saints Church, Scaleby

==== Derbyshire ====
- All Saints' Church, Aston-upon-Trent
- All Saints Church, Ballidon
- All Saints' Church, Bakewell
- All Saints' Church, Breadsall
- All Saints' Church, Lullington
- All Saints Church, Kedleston
- All Saints' Church, Ripley

==== Devon ====
- All Saints' Church, Dunterton

==== Dorset ====
- All Saints Church, Branksome
- All Saints' Church, Chalbury
- All Saints Church, Dorchester
- All Saints Church, Hampreston
- All Saints' Church, Mapperton
- All Saints Church, Nether Cerne
- All Saints Church, Portland
- All Saints' Church, Southbourne
- All Saints' Church, Stour Row
- All Saints' Church, Tarrant Keyneston
- All Saints Church, Wyke Regis

==== East Midlands ====
- All Saints' Church, Oakham

==== East Sussex ====
- All Saints Church, Hastings
- All Saints Church, Heathfield
- All Saints Church, Hove
- All Saints Church, Hurstmonceaux
- All Saints Church, Patcham

==== Essex ====
- All Saints Church, Creeksea
- All Saints Church, East Horndon
- All Saints Church, Maldon
- All Saints Church, Vange

==== Gloucestershire ====
- All Saints' Church, Cheltenham
- All Saints Church, Selsley
- All Saints Church, Shorncote

==== Hampshire ====
- All Saints' Church, Alton
- All Saints' Church, Bassett
- All Saints Church, Crondall
- All Saints Church, East Meon
- All Saints' Church, Fawley
- All Saints Church, Little Somborne
- All Saints' Church, Milford-on-Sea
- All Saints Church, Minstead
- All Saints Church, Odiham
- All Saints' Church, Southampton

==== Hertfordshire ====
- All Saints' Church, Hertford
- All Saints' Church, Hockerill

==== Isle of Wight ====
- All Saints' Church, Calbourne
- All Saints' Church, Freshwater
- All Saints' Church, Godshill
- All Saints' Church, Gurnard
- All Saints' Church, Newchurch
- All Saints' Church, Ryde

==== Kent ====
- All Saints' Church, Boughton Aluph, near Ashford
- All Saints Church, Brenchley, near Royal Tunbridge Wells
- All Saints Church, Frindsbury
- All Saints Church, Hartley, near Sevenoaks
- All Saints Church, Lydd
- All Saints Church, Maidstone
- All Saints' Church, Shuart
- All Saints Church, Snodland
- All Saints Church, Staplehurst
- St Peter's and St Paul's Church, Sutton by Dover
- All Saints Church, Ulcombe
- All Saints Church, Waldershare
- All Saints Church, Westbere
- All Saints Church, West Stourmouth
- Hope Church of All Saints, near New Romney

==== Lancashire ====
- All Saints Church, Hesketh Bank
- All Saints Church, Higher Walton
- Our Lady and All Saints Church, Parbold
- All Saints Church, Preston
- All Saints' Church, Urmston

==== Leicestershire ====
- All Saints Church, Beeby
- All Saints Church, Dunton Bassett
- All Saints Church, Gilmorton
- All Saints Church, Leicester
- All Saints Church, Long Whatton
- All Saints Church, Loughborough
- All Saints Church, Narborough
- All Saints Church, Scraptoft
- All Saints Church, Swinford
- All Saints Church, Wigston Magna

==== Lincolnshire ====
- All Saints Church, Barrowby
- Old All Saints Church, Great Steeping
- All Saints Church, Haugham
- All Saints' Church, Horsington
- All Saints Church, Saltfleetby
- All Saints Church, Theddlethorpe
- All Saints Church, Winterton
- All Saints Church, Wragby

==== London ====
- All Saints Church, Benhilton, Sutton
- All Saints' Blackheath
- All Saints, Camden Town
- All Saints, Chingford
- All Saints Church, East Sheen
- All Saints' Church, Edmonton
- All Saints Church, Fulham
- All Saints' Church, Isleworth
- All Saints Church, Harrow Weald
- All Saints Church, Ennismore Gardens, Knightsbridge
- All Saints Church, Kingston upon Thames
- All Saints, Margaret Street
- All Saints Notting Hill
- All Saints' Church, Oakleigh Park, Barnet
- All Saints Church, Peckham
- All Saints' Church, Putney Common
- All Saints Church, Poplar
- All Saints Church, Tufnell Park
- All Saints Church, Twickenham
- All Saints Church, Wandsworth
- All Saints Church, West Dulwich
- All Saints Church, West Ham

==== Merseyside ====
- All Saints' Church, Childwall
- All Saints Church, Speke, Liverpool
- All Saints' Church, St Helens, Sutton, St Helens
- All Saints Church, Thornton Hough

==== Norfolk ====
- All Saints Church, Ashwicken
- All Saints Church, Billockby
- All Saints Church, Boughton
- All Saints Church, Cockley Cley
- All Saints Church, Crostwight
- All Saints Church, Croxton
- All Saints Church, Hargham
- All Saints Church, Hilgay
- All Saints Church, Narborough
- All Saints Church, Newton by Castle Acre
- All Saints Church, North Runcton
- All Saints Church, Old Buckenham
- All Saints Church, Shipdham
- All Saints Church, Shouldham
- All Saints Church, Snetterton
- All Saints Church, South Lynn
- All Saints Church, Stoke Ferry
- All Saints Church, Thurgarton
- All Saints Church, Walsoken
- All Saints Church, West Harling
- All Saints Church, Wilby
- All Saints Church, Wretton

==== Northamptonshire ====
- All Saints Church, Aldwincle
- All Saints' Church, Barnwell
- All Saints' Church, Brixworth
- All Saints' Church, Earls Barton
- All Saints Church, Holdenby
- All Saints' Church, Northampton
- All Saints Church, Wellingborough
- Church of All Saints, Thorpe Malsor

==== Nottinghamshire ====
- All Saints' Church, Nottingham
- All Saints' Church, Syerston
- All Saints' Church, Thrumpton
- All Saints' Church, Weston, Nottinghamshire

==== Oxfordshire ====
- All Saints Church, Oxford
- All Saints Church, Shirburn
- All Saints' Church, Sutton Courtenay

==== Shropshire ====
- All Saints Church, Berrington
- All Saints Church, Claverley
- All Saints Church, Shelve
- All Saints Church, Wellington
- All Saints Church, Worthen

==== Somerset ====
- Church of All Saints, Alford
- All Saints Church, Dodington
- Church of All Saints, East Pennard
- Church of All Saints, Kingston Seymour
- Church of All Saints, Long Ashton, a Grade II* listed building in North Somerset
- Church of All Saints, Langport
- Church of All Saints, Lullington
- Church of All Saints, Martock
- Church of All Saints, Monksilver
- Church of All Saints, Nunney
- Church of All Saints, Nynehead
- Church of All Saints, Publow
- Church of All Saints, Selworthy
- Church of All Saints, Sutton Bingham
- Church of All Saints, Trull
- Church of All Saints, West Camel
- All Saints' Church, Weston, Somerset
- All Saints Church, Woolley
- Church of All Saints, Wootton Courtenay
- All Saints Church, Wraxall
- Church of All Saints, Wrington

==== Staffordshire ====
- All Saints Church, Balterley
- All Saints' Church, Leek
- All Saints' Church, Madeley

==== Suffolk ====
- All Saints Church, Easton
- All Saints Church, Ellough
- All Saints' Church, Icklingham
- All Saints Church, Little Wenham
- All Saints Church, Newmarket
- All Saints Church, Newton Green
- All Saints Church, South Elmham
- All Saints Church, Wordwell
- All Saints Church, Wickhambrook

==== Surrey ====
- All Saints Church, Carshalton
- All Saints Church, Oxted

==== Tyne and Wear ====
- All Saints' Church, Monkwearmouth
- All Saints' Church, Newcastle upon Tyne
- All Saints' Church, Penshaw

==== Warwickshire ====
- All Saints Church, Billesley
- All Saints' Church, Burton Dassett
- All Saints Church, Chadshunt
- All Saints' Church, Honington
- All Saints Church, Leamington Spa
- All Saints Church, Weston-on-Avon

==== West Midlands ====
- All Saints' Church, Sedgley
- All Saints' Church, Small Heath (I)
- All Saints' Church, Small Heath (II)
- St Mary & All Saints, Walsall

==== West Sussex ====
- All Saints Church, Buncton
- All Saints Church, Highbrook
- All Saints Church, Roffey

==== Wiltshire ====
- All Saints Church, Alton Priors
- All Saints Church, Idmiston
- All Saints Church, Lydiard Millicent
- The Church of All Saints, Maiden Bradley

==== Worcestershire ====
- All Saints Church, Evesham
- Church of All Saints, Wilden

==== Yorkshire ====
- All Saints' Church, Appleton-le-Street, North Yorkshire
- All Saints Church, Arksey, Arksey, South Yorkshire
- Church of All Saints, Aston cum Aughton, South Yorkshire
- Church of All Saints, Aughton, East Riding of Yorkshire
- All Saints' Church, Barwick-in-Elmet, West Yorkshire
- All Saints' Church, Batley, West Yorkshire
- Church of All Saints, Bingley, West Yorkshire
- All Saints' Church, Bramham, West Yorkshire
- All Saints' Church, Brompton, North Yorkshire
- St John and All Saints' Church, Easingwold, North Yorkshire
- All Saints Church, Ecclesall, Sheffield
- Church of All Saints, Great Ayton, North Yorkshire
- All Saints' Church, Harewood, West Yorkshire
- Church of All Saints, Ledsham, West Yorkshire
- All Saints' Church, Moor Monkton, North Yorkshire
- All Saints' Church, Muston, North Yorkshire
- All Saints' Church, Nether Silton, North Yorkshire
- All Saints' Church, Newton-on-Ouse, North Yorkshire
- All Saints' Church, Normanton, West Yorkshire
- All Saints' Church, Northallerton, North Yorkshire
- Church of All Saints, Pocklington, East Riding of Yorkshire
- All Saints' Church, Ripley, North Yorkshire
- All Saints Church, Rotherham, South Yorkshire, now Rotherham Minster
- All Saints' Church, Rufforth, York
- All Saints' Church, Ryther, North Yorkshire
- Church of All Saints, Settrington, East Riding of Yorkshire
- Old All Saints Church, Skelton-in-Cleveland, North Yorkshire
- Church of All Saints, Silkstone
- Church of All Saints, Terrington, North Yorkshire
- All Saints Church, Thorpe Bassett, North Yorkshire
- All Saints' Church, Totley, Sheffield
- All Saints' Church, Upper Poppleton, York
- All Saints' Church, Weston, North Yorkshire
- All Saints' Church, Yafforth, North Yorkshire
- All Saints' Church, North Street, York
- All Saints' Church, Pavement, York
- All Saints Church, Woodlands, South Yorkshire

=== Scotland ===
- All Saints Church, Glencarse, Perthshire
- All Saints' Church, St Andrews, Fife

=== Wales ===
- All Saints Church, Ammanford, Carmarthenshire
- All Saints Church, Deganwy, Gwynedd
- All Saints' Church, Gresford, Wrexham County Borough
- All Saints Church, Higher Kinnerton, Flintshire
- All Saints Church, Kemeys Commander, Monmouthshire
- All Saints' Church, Llangar, Denbighshire
- All Saints' Church, Oystermouth, Swansea

== United States ==
- All Saint's Church (Oracle, Arizona)
- All Saints Church of Eben Ezer, Brush, Colorado
- All Saints Catholic Church (Manassas, Virginia)
- All Saints Catholic Church (Taylorsville, Kentucky)
- Church of All Saints (Keokuk, Iowa)
- All Saints Catholic Church (Stuart, Iowa)
- All Saints' Church (Easton, Maryland)
- All Saints' Church (Sunderland, Maryland)
- All Saints Church at Monie, Venton, Maryland
- All Saints' Church Ashmont (Boston, Massachusetts)
- All Saints Church (Peterborough, New Hampshire)
- All Saints' Memorial Church (Navesink, New Jersey)
- All Saints Roman Catholic Church (Buffalo, New York)
- All Saints Church (Manhattan), New York City, New York
- All Saints Antiochian Orthodox Church, Raleigh, North Carolina
- All Saints Catholic Church (Cincinnati, Ohio)
- All Saints Catholic Church (New Riegel, Ohio)
- All Saints Church (Pawleys Island, South Carolina)
- All Saints Catholic Church (Houston), Texas
- All Saints Catholic Church (Manassas, Virginia)

== Other countries ==
- All Saints' Church, Himarë, Albania
- All Saints' Church, Barbados
- Church of All Saints, Minsk, in Minsk, Belarus
- All Saints Church, Livno, Bosnia and Herzegovina
- All Saints' Church, Santos, Brazil
- All Saints Church (Hamilton, Ontario), Canada
- All Saints Church, Shanghai, China
- All Saints' Church, Tianjin, China
- All Saints Church (Prague Castle), Czech Republic
- All Saints' Church, Copenhagen, Denmark
- All Saints' Cathedral, Hong Kong, formerly All Saints' Church
- All Saints Church, Jakarta, Indonesia
- Ognissanti, Florence, Italy
- All Saints' Church, Rome, Italy
- All Saints' Church, Taiping, Malaysia
- All Saint's Parish Church, Ikosi, Nigeria
- All Saints Church, Peshawar, Pakistan
- All Saints Church, Warsaw, Poland
- Church of All Saints at Kulishki, Moscow, Russia
- Church of All Saints, Yekaterinburg, Russia
- All Saints Church, Maidstone, KwaZulu-Natal, South Africa
- All Saints Church, Uniondale, South Africa
- Rotunda of All Saints, Dechtice, Slovakia
- All Saints' Church, Puerto de la Cruz, North Tenerife, Canary Islands, Spain
- All Saints' Church, Borella, Sri Lanka
- All Saints' Church, Galle, Sri Lanka
- All Saints Church, Gothenburg, Sweden
- All Saints Church, Lund, Sweden
- Church of All Saints, Chernihiv, Ukraine

== See also ==
- All Saints' Abbey (disambiguation)
- All Saints Anglican Church (disambiguation)
- All Saints Episcopal Church (disambiguation)
- All Saints Memorial Church (disambiguation)
- All Saints Cathedral (disambiguation)
- All Saints Chapel (disambiguation)
