= All Saints Anglican Church =

All Saints Anglican Church may refer to:

== Australia ==
- All Saints Anglican Church, Ainslie, Australian Capital Territory
- All Saints Anglican Church, Brisbane, Queensland
- All Saints Anglican Church, Darnley Island, Queensland
- All Saints Anglican Church, Yandilla, Queensland
- All Saints Anglican Church, Henley Brook, Western Australia
- All Saints Anglican Church, Petersham, New South Wales
- All Saints Anglican Church, Mitcham, Victoria

== Canada ==
- All Saints Anglican Church (Dominion City, Manitoba)
- All Saints Anglican Church (Duck Lake, Saskatchewan)
- All Saints Anglican Church (Teulon, Manitoba)
- All Saints Anglican Church (Ottawa)
- All Saints Anglican Church (English Harbour, Newfoundland and Labrador)

== United States ==
- All Saints Anglican Church (Pawleys Island, South Carolina)

== See also ==
- All Saints Church (disambiguation)
