= All Saints Chapel =

All Saints Chapel, or All Saints' Chapel, may refer to:

== United Kingdom ==
- Royal Chapel of All Saints, Windsor Great Park, Berkshire, England
- All Saints Chapel, Somerford, Cheshire
- All Saints Chapel, Instow, Devon
- All Saints' Chapel, Wardour, at New Wardour Castle, Wiltshire

== United States ==
- All Saints Chapel and Morris Family Burial Ground, Morris, New York, listed on the National Register of Historic Places (NRHP)
- All Saints' Chapel (Rosendale, New York), listed on the NRHP
- All Saints Chapel (Raleigh, North Carolina), listed on the NRHP
- All Saints' Chapel (Sewanee) at the University of the South, Tennessee

== Other countries ==
- Chapel of All Saints, Geelong Grammar School, Victoria, Australia
- Chapel of All Saints, Tarnobrzeg, Poland

== See also ==
- All Saints Church (disambiguation)
- All Saints Episcopal Church (disambiguation)
- All Saints Pastoral Centre, London Colney, Hertfordshire, England
