= Luke Voyno-Yasenetsky =

Russian scientist, Orthodox bishop and saint (1877–1961)

Saint Luke the Blessed Surgeon
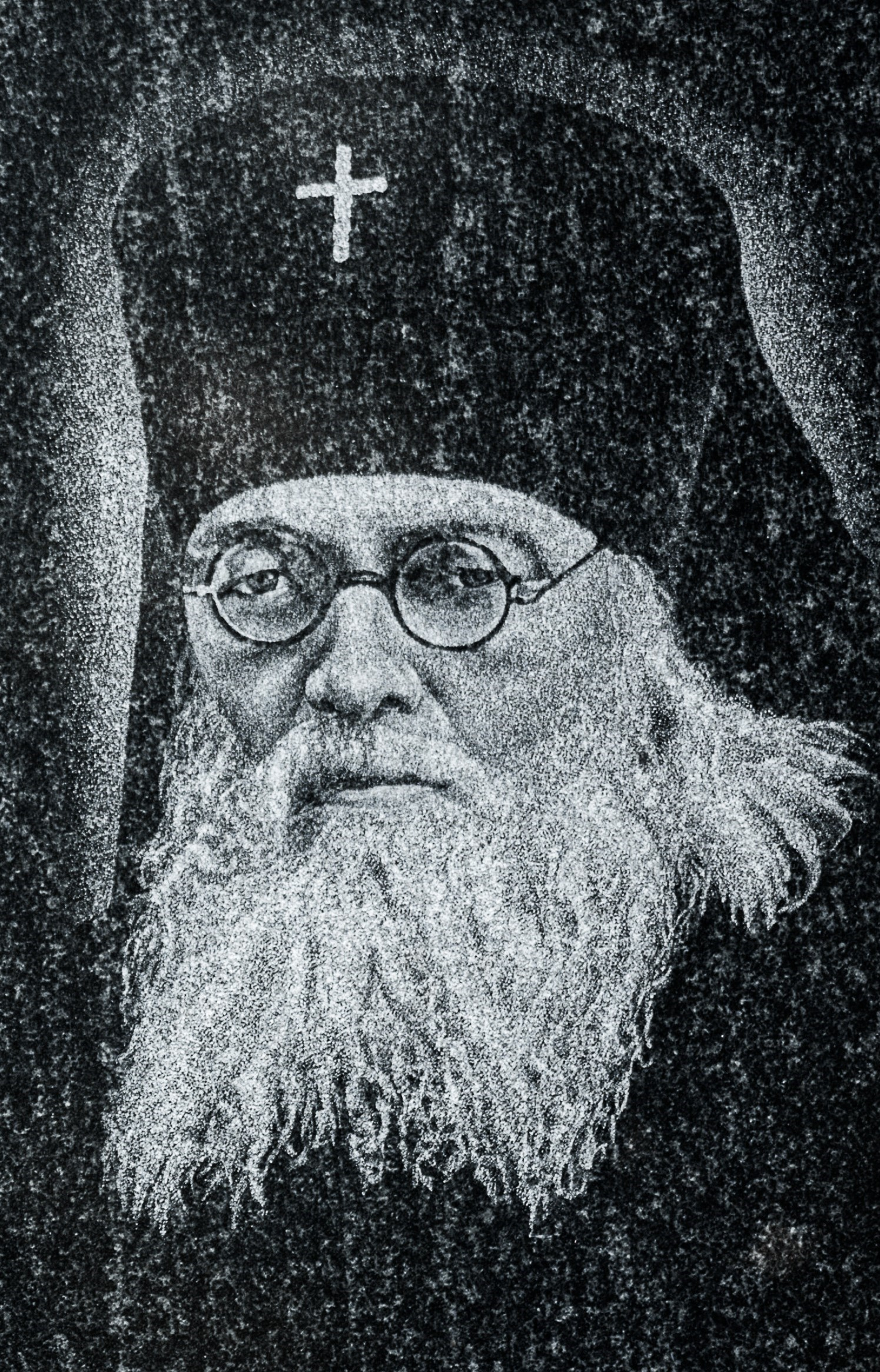
- Voyno-Yasenetsky's likeness from a commemorative plaque in Pereslavl-Zalessky, Russia

Archbishop, Hieroconfessor, Wonderworker and Surgeon
- Born: Valentin Felixovich Voyno-Yasenetsky; 27 April 1877; Kerch, Russian Empire
- Died: 11 June 1961 (aged 84); Simferopol, Ukrainian SSR, Soviet Union
- Resting place: Simferopol
- Venerated in: Eastern Orthodox Church
- Canonized: 25 May 1996, Sarov Monastery by the Holy Synod, Russian Orthodox Church
- Major shrine: Holy Trinity Cathedral, Simferopol
- Feast: 29 May (O.S); 11 June (N.S)
- Attributes: Wearing bishop's vestment, pectoral cross and engolpion worn about his neck, miter and crozier.
- Patronage: Crimea; nurses; pharmacies; physicians; surgeons; scientists; Military Medical Academy of Serbia

Valentin Felixovich Voyno-Yasenetsky (Russian: Валенти́н Фе́ликсович Во́йно-Ясене́цкий; (Note: Russian pronunciation: [vəlʲɪnʲˈtʲin ˈfʲelʲɪksəvʲɪtɕ ˈvojnə jɪsʲɪˈnʲetskʲɪj].) 27 April [O.S. 15 April] 1877 – 11 June 1961) – now known as Luke of Simferopol, Saint Luke the Blessed Surgeon, or Saint Luke of Crimea – was a Russian surgeon, spiritual writer, a bishop of the Russian Orthodox Church, and archbishop of Simferopol and Crimea from May 1946 until his death. He was a laureate of the Stalin Prize in medicine in 1946.

== Personal life ==
Valentin Voyno-Yasenetsky was born in 1877 in Kerch. In 1889, his family moved to Kiev. In Kiev, he graduated from the gymnasium and art school, then Valentin entered the medical faculty of Kiev University.

Then he met the sister of mercy Anna Vasilyevna Lanskaya, whom he married, and they had two children. In 1917, Anna fell ill with tuberculosis, and the family moved to Tashkent. But in 1919, Anna Voyno-Yasenetskaya died.

In 1921, Voyno-Yasenetsky Ordained as priest, then took Religious name Luke, later became a consecrated bishop of Simpherophool and Crimea. After the war, he was awarded the medal "For Valiant Labour in the Great Patriotic War 1941–1945".

In 1955, Luke became completely blind.

== Medical career ==
His most important work in medicine is Sketches of Purulent Surgery (1934). This is still a reference book and a manual for surgeons. Also, he operated patients who had diseases of the gall bladder, stomach, and other organs of the abdominal cavity, and worked in neurosurgery and orthopedics. Voyno-Yasenetsky made a great contribution to anesthesiology. His first monograph, Regional anesthesiology, was published in 1915 in Petrograd. In 1916 he defended a thesis About regional anesthesiology of the second branch of the trigeminal nerve. He wrote about the practical importance of the regional anesthesia method in the attachment to the Essays of purulent surgery.

"... a great amount of death is due to unskillful or careless use of chloroform and ether. [...] That's why these methods of local anaesthesia which help doctors pay attention only to the operation have a great importance. In my opinion, one of the most important conditions in the development of the rural surgery is the wide familiarisation of doctors with these methods..."

Voyno-Yasenetsky was the first who described the anaesthesia for the trigeminal nerve by the use of ethanol into the branches of this nerve (orbital, maxillary and mandibular) and into Gasser's, or trigeminal ganglion.

He presented four reports in the first scientific meeting of the doctors in Turkestan (23-28 October 1922). There were conclusions about surgical treatment of tuberculosis, purulent processes of knee joints, hand tendons and costal cartilages.

Voyno-Yasenetsky made an experiment with the bacteriologist Guselnikov in which they were studying the mechanism of the purulent processes in the costal cartilages after typhus.

While working in the military hospital in Krasnoyarsk, he invented new operations, such as joints rejection. This operation was used to treat osteomyelitis of big joints.

== Religious life ==
As a noticeable religious figure, he was subjected to political repressions and spent 11 years in internal exile.

Luke's mother was Russian Orthodox and his father was Roman Catholic, and according to his memoirs, he did not receive a religious upbringing from his family. When he left school the principal gave him a copy of the New Testament, and it was by a careful study of this that he came to know the teachings of Christ.

In 1958, writing after Stalin's death, and under Nikita Khrushchev's new wave of anti-religious persecution, Saint Luke stated "how arduous it has been to swim against the stormy current of antireligious propaganda, and how many sufferings it caused me, and continues to cause me to this day."

== Veneration ==
=== Canonization ===
He was canonized by the Russian Orthodox Church on May 25, 1996. His feast day is commemorated on May 29 (according to the Julian calendar) or June 11 (according to the Revised Julian Calendar). On March 17, 1996, Luke's remains were disinterred, with many thousands of people attending the ceremony. It is said that an indescribable aroma arose from his relics, while his heart was discovered incorrupt. Three days later, on 20 March 1996, his relics were transferred to the Cathedral of the Holy Trinity in Simferopol.

On June 13, 2019, the Ecumenical Patriarchate of Constantinople also ranked Archbishop Luke in the list of saints of the Church.

=== Relics ===
In Greece, portions of his relics are found in the Sagmata Monastery (in Boeotia, near Thebes and Ypato), Dovra Monastery, All Saints Antiochian Orthodox Church in Raleigh, and a few other churches.

== Gallery ==
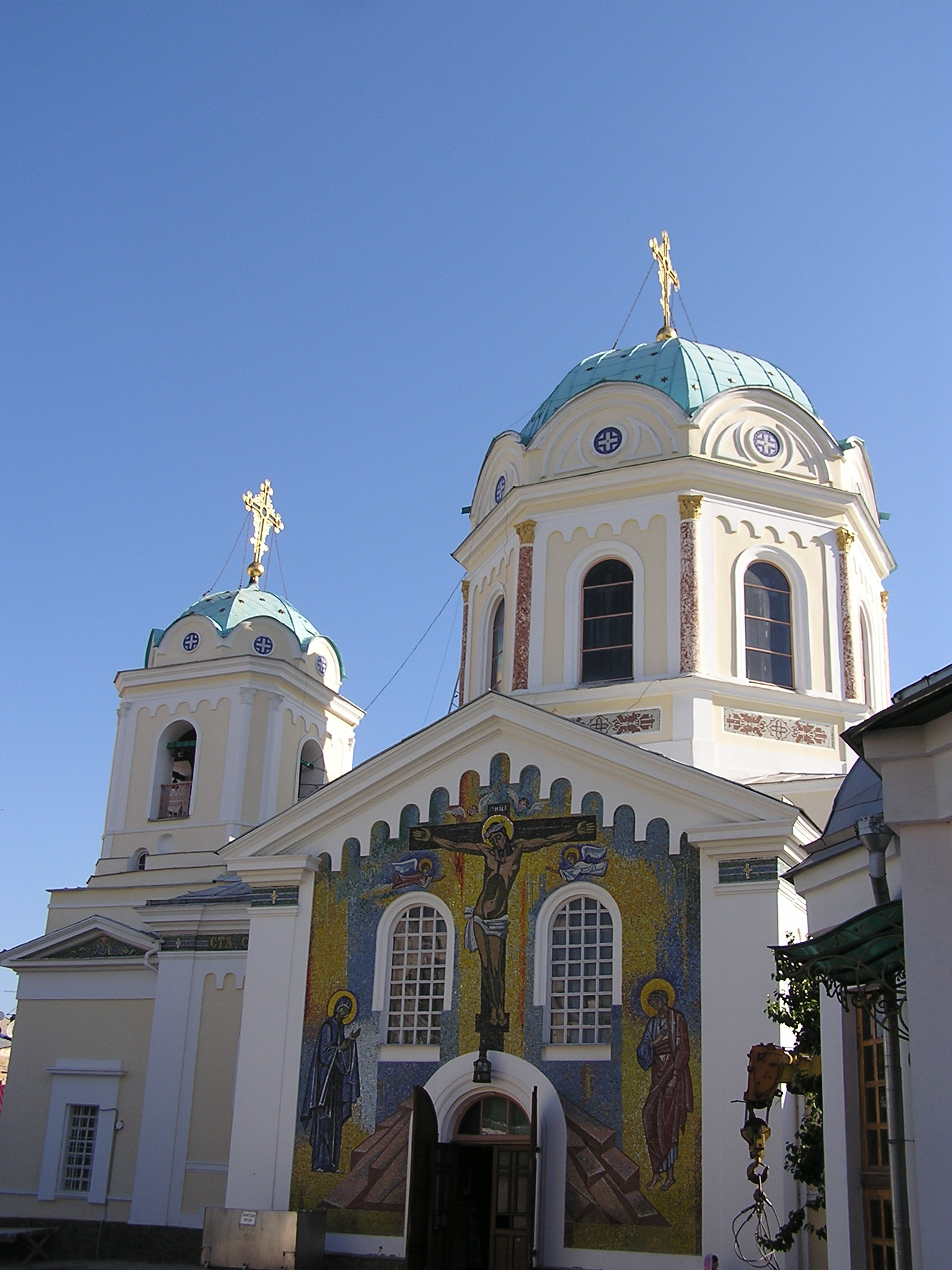
Holy Trinity cathedral in Simferopol, where the relics of St. Luke are held.

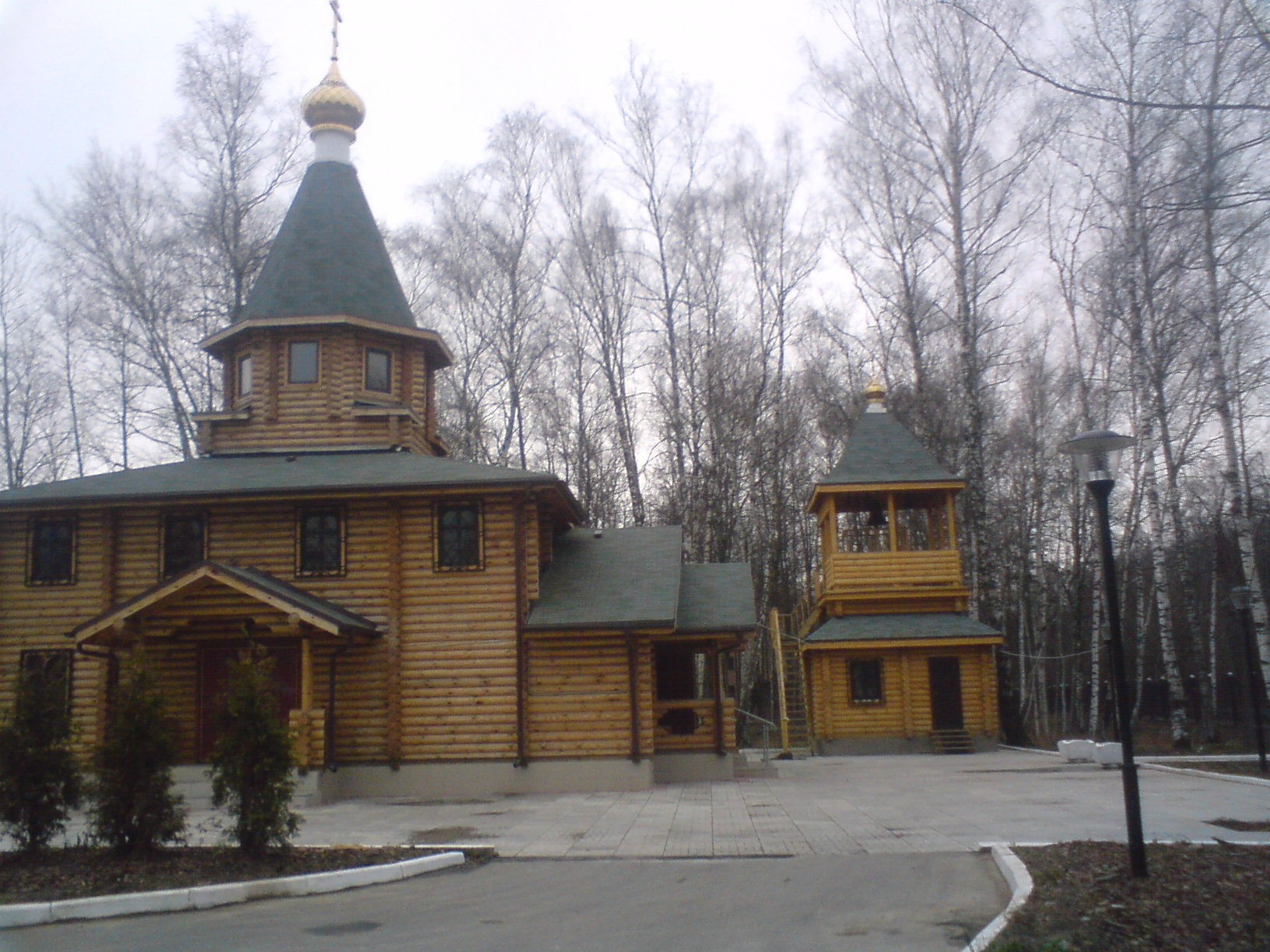
Church of Luke, Archbishop of Crimea, at the Medical Radiological Research Center (Obninsk)

Eastern Orthodox Church titles
Preceded by Innocent (Pustynsky)	Bishop of Tashkent and Turkestan; 1923-1927	Succeeded by Sergius (Lavrov)
Preceded by Anthony (Milovidov)	Archbishop of Krasnoyarsk and Yenisei; 1942-1944	Succeeded by Bartholomew (Gorodtsov)
Preceded by Gregory (Chykov)	Archbishop of Tambov and Michurinsk; 1944-1946	Succeeded by Joasaph (Jurmanov)
Preceded by Joasaph (Jurmanov)	Archbishop of Simferopol and Crimea; 1946-1961	Succeeded by Alypius (Chotovitskiy)

== See also ==
- Confessor of the Faith
- Holy Unmercenaries
