= All Saints' Abbey =

All Saints' Abbey may refer to:

- All Saints' Abbey (Baden-Württemberg), Germany
- Kloster Allerheiligen, Schaffhausen ('All Saints' Abbey'), Switzerland

== See also ==
- All Saints Church (disambiguation)
