= All Saints Episcopal Church =

All Saints Episcopal Church may refer to the following charches in the United States:

- All Saints' Episcopal Church (Beverly Hills, California)
- All Saints Episcopal Church (Pasadena, California)
- All Saints Episcopal Church (San Diego, California)
- All Saints Episcopal Church (San Leandro, California)
- All Saints Episcopal Church (Denver), listed on the NRHP in Colorado
- All Saints' Church, Delmar, Sussex County, Delaware
- All Saints Episcopal Church (Rehoboth Beach, Delaware)
- All Saints Episcopal Church (Enterprise, Florida), listed on the NRHP in Florida
- All Saints Episcopal Church (Fairbanks, Florida)
- All Saints Episcopal Church (Fort Lauderdale, Florida)
- All Saints Episcopal Church (Jacksonville)
- All Saints Episcopal Church, Waveland (Jensen Beach, Florida)
- All Saints' Episcopal Church (Lakeland), Florida
- All Saints Episcopal Church (Winter Park, Florida), listed on the NRHP in Florida
- All Saints' Episcopal Church (Atlanta), Georgia
- All Saints Episcopal Church (Chicago), Illinois
- Episcopal Church of All Saints (Indianapolis), Indiana
- All Saints Episcopal Church (DeQuincy, Louisiana), listed on the NRHP
- All Hallows Episcopal Church in Snow Hill, Maryland, listed on the NRHP
- All Hallows Church (South River, Maryland), listed on the NRHP
- All Saints' Church (Easton, Maryland), listed on the NRHP
- All Saints Church (Frederick, Maryland), contributing structure in NRHP Frederick Historic District
- All Saints' Church (Sunderland, Maryland), listed on the NRHP
- All Saints' Church Ashmont (Boston, Massachusetts)
- All Saints Episcopal Church (Saugatuck, Michigan)
- All Saints' Episcopal Church (Briarcliff Manor, New York), NRHP-listed
- All Saints Episcopal Church (Irondequoit, New York), former Episcopal church
- All Saints Episcopal Church (Round Lake, New York)
- All Saints Episcopal Church (Valley City, North Dakota), on the NRHP in North Dakota
- All Saints Episcopal Church (Portsmouth, Ohio), listed on the NRHP in Ohio
- All Saints' Episcopal Church (Philadelphia), Pennsylvania
- All Saints' Episcopal Church, Waccamaw, listed on the NRHP in South Carolina
- All Saints Episcopal Church (Appleton, Wisconsin)

== See also ==
- All Saints Church (disambiguation)
