= All Saints' Church, Erfurt =

All Saints' Church
- German: Allerheiligenkirche
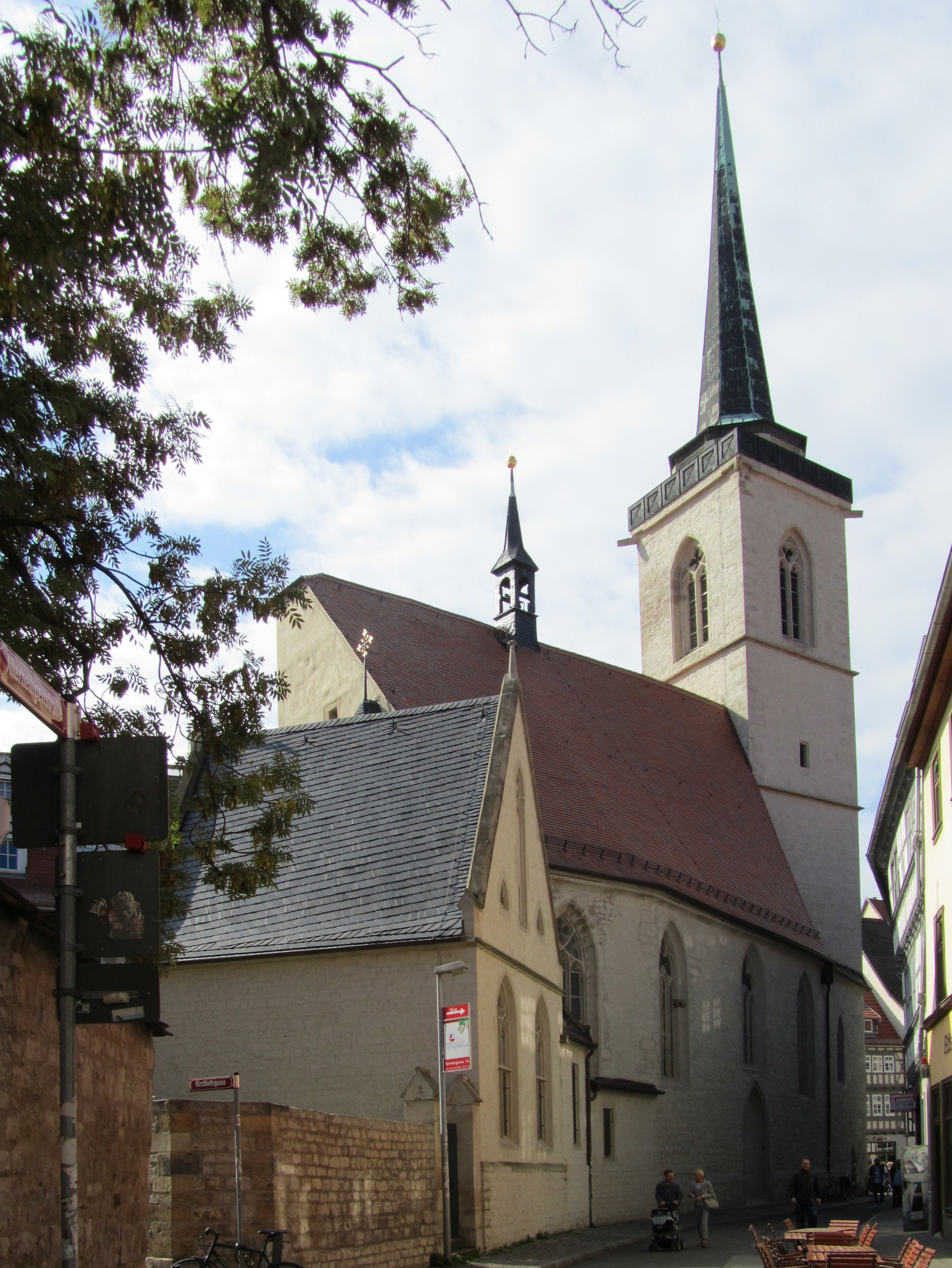
- View from Allerheiligenstraße

- 50°58′40″N 11°1′36″E
- Location: Erfurt, Thuringia
- Country: Germany
- Denomination: Catholic

History
- Status: Subsidiary church
- Founded: 1117
- Dedication: All Saints
- Consecrated: 1125

Architecture
- Heritage designation: Kulturdenkmal in Thuringia
- Architectural type: Hall church
- Style: Gothic
- Years built: 12th to 14th century

Administration
- Diocese: Diocese of Erfurt

All Saints' Church (German: Allerheiligenkirche) in the city of Erfurt in Thuringia, Germany, is a small Roman Catholic church building dating from the 12th to 14th century. The Gothic hall church is located at the fork of Allerheiligenstraße and Marktstraße in the historical centre of Erfurt. It has an irregular floor plan and, at 53 metres (173 ft 11 in), the highest church tower in the old part of the city. Since 2007, it has been the first Roman Catholic church in central Germany to house a columbarium.

== History ==
In 1117, All Saints' Church was founded by the Presbyter Erkenbert and the archbishop's viceroy Adalbert as an Augustinian canonical convent with a monastery and hospital. In 1125, the Archbishop Adalbert of Mainz confirmed the foundation in writing for the first time in a document. The church was probably consecrated in the same year. In 1222, a fire raged in the old part of the city, to which the church and the monastery largely fell victim. The associated hospital was mentioned for the last time in 1234 and was probably moved to the Reglerkirche or abolished soon afterwards. Later, the Haus zur Engelsburg stood on the site of the hospital, which became the property of university professors from the 15th century onwards. The church building destroyed in the town fire probably only had a nave in rectangular form and a west tower protruding to the south.

During the reconstruction of All Saints' Church in the Gothic style, which lasted until the 14th century, the ground plan was adapted to the layout of the street. Thus, to this day, the walls of the nave do not run parallel, but begin narrowly at the west tower and widen towards the east. In addition, the nave was divided into two parts and given a roof structure with two wooden pointed barrels. This construction is still preserved today, but is hidden by a flat ceiling inserted in the 19th century. The square west tower with its pointed spire suffered frequent damage from lightning strikes. The tower and its spire had to be renewed in 1487, 1628 and 1870. During the Reformation, services were suspended in 1525, but resumed a year later in 1526. In 1724, Johann Georg Schröter built the first organ in the church, which was later replaced by an instrument made in 1806.

Between 1896 and 1898, extensive reconstruction work was carried out on All Saints' Church, adding a polygonal choir with a sacristy to the east of the north part of the nave and removing a sacristy in the south part. Furthermore, the west gallery with the organ was renewed and the former three-part Baroque altar was moved to the east wall of the nave's south part. Finally, the north portal was bricked up and the south portal opened. In 1915 and 1919, the interior of the church was repainted under the direction of Prof. Hanftmann.

In 1936, the congregation of All Saints' Church was absorbed into the Cathedral parish and has since served as a subsidiary church of the cathedral.

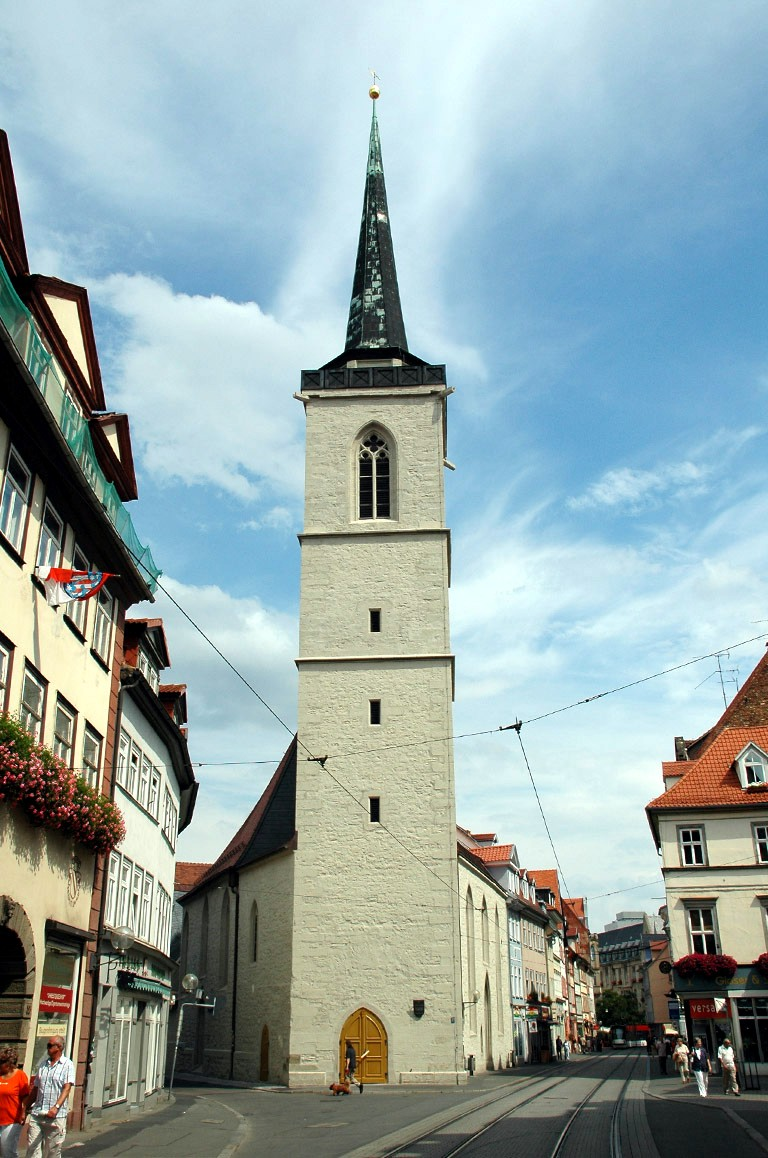
View from west

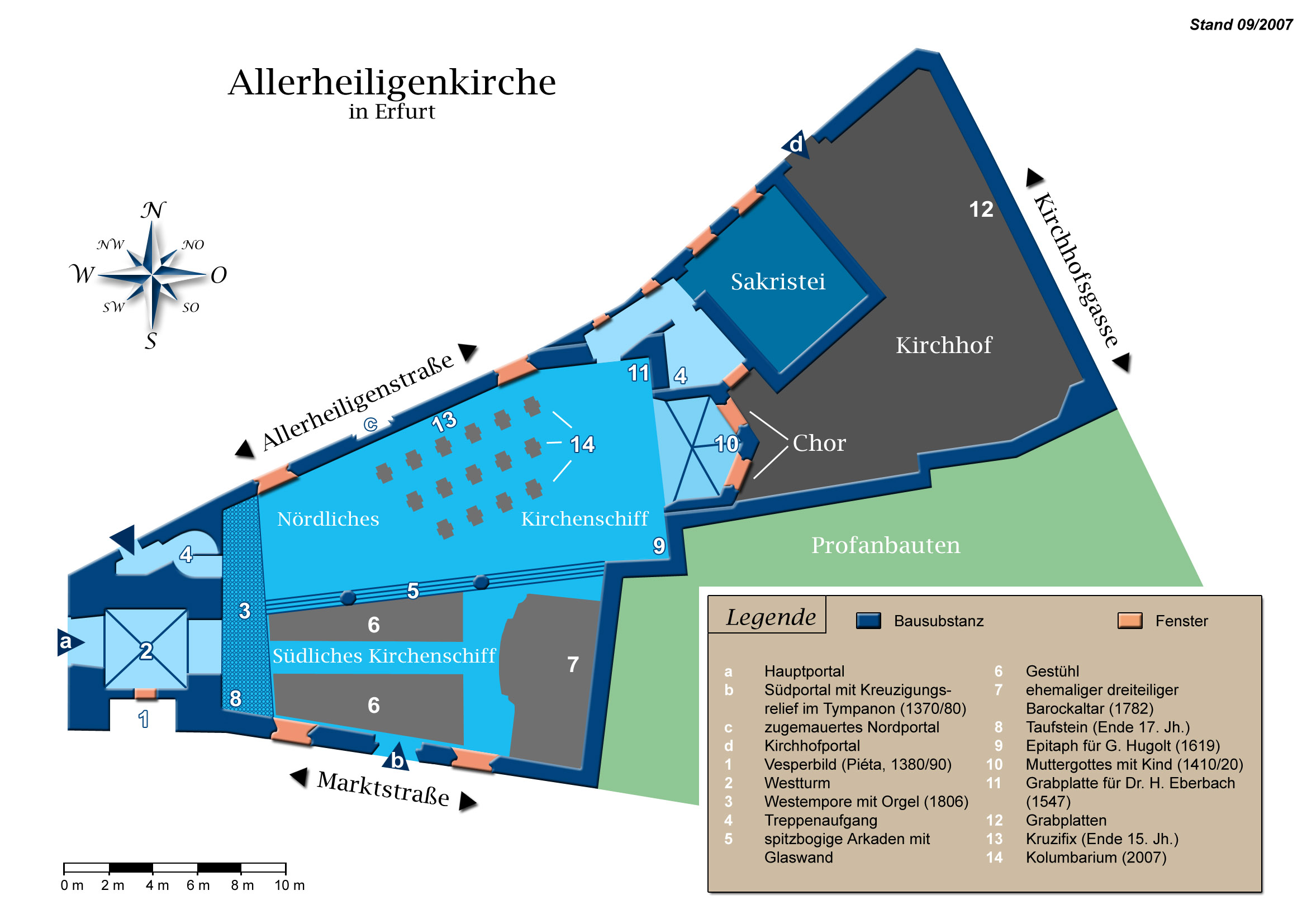
The irregular ground plan

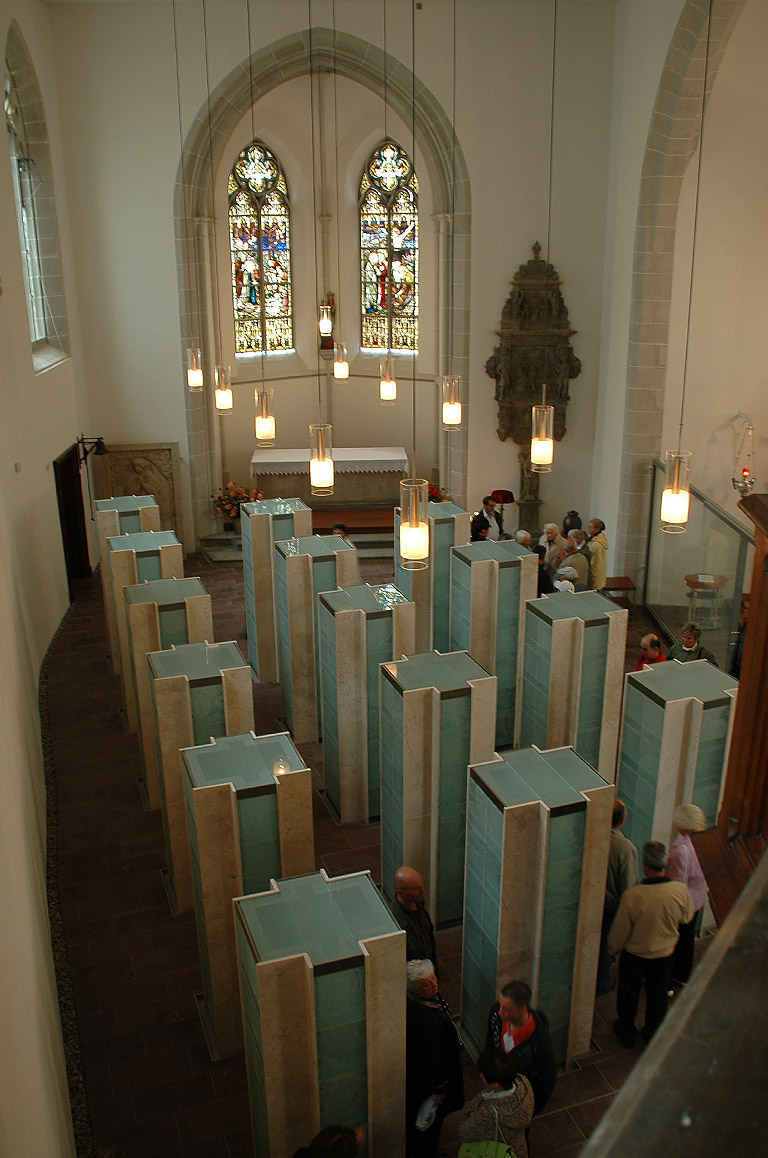
View into the columbarium

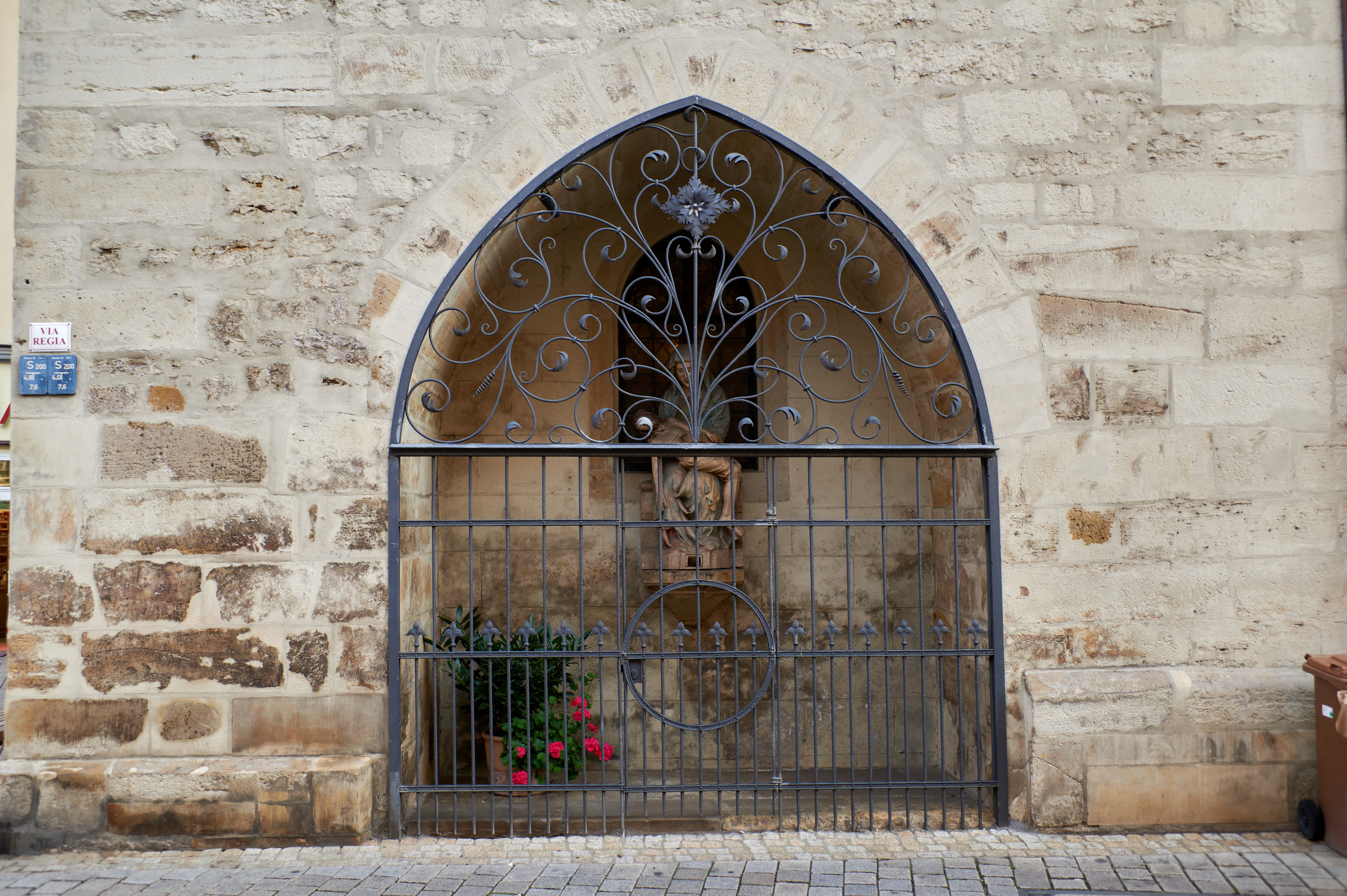
The niche to the south

== Architecture and interior ==
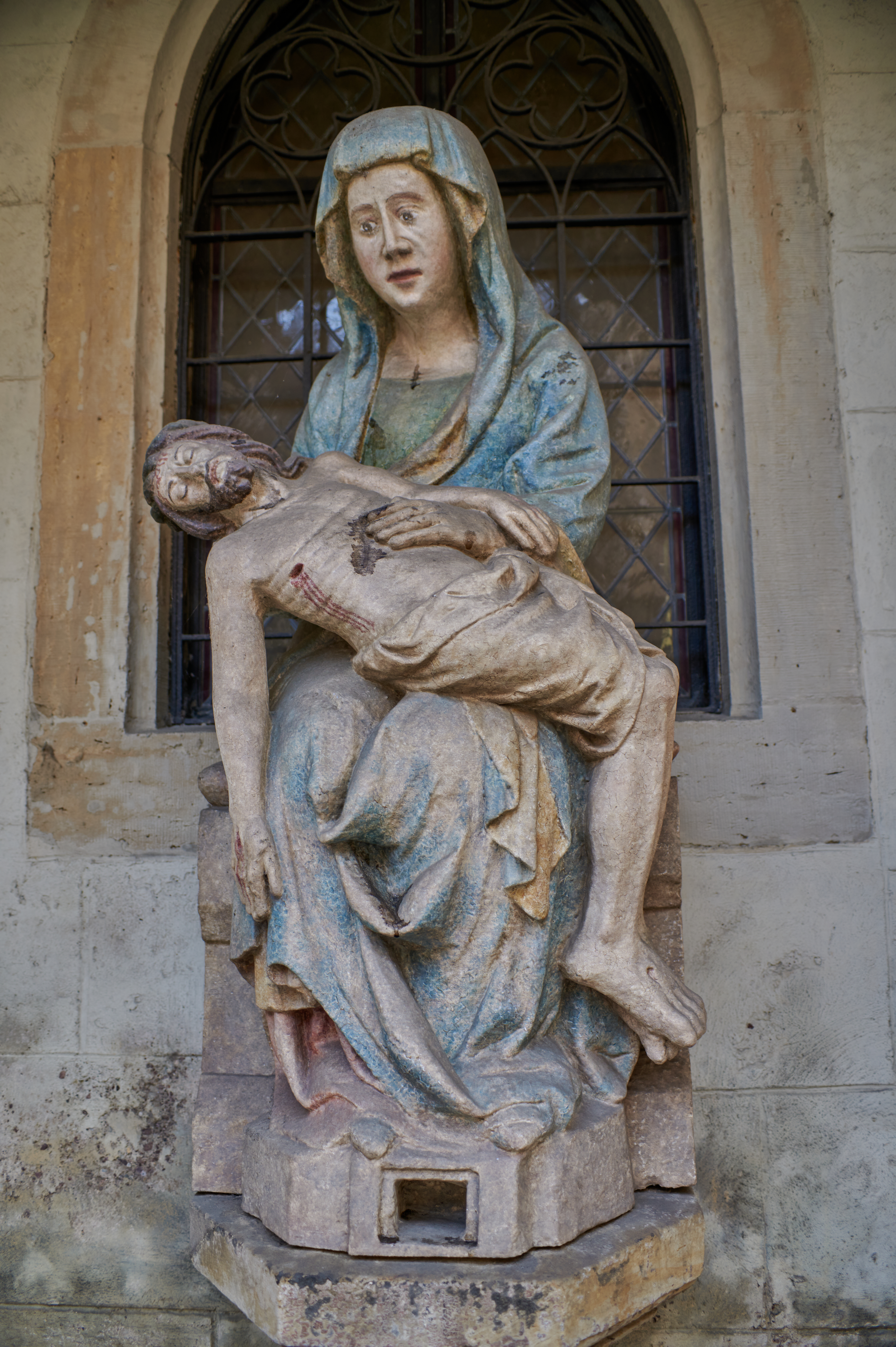
The Pietà

All Saints' Church is a small Roman Catholic hall church in the Gothic style. It has a total of three pointed-arched portals, of which the north portal was bricked up at the end of the 19th century. The south portal has a sandstone relief from 1370 to 1380 in the area of the tympanum, which depicts the crucifixion group. The crossbeams of the cross resemble bent branches bearing rich fruit and are probably intended to symbolise the tree of life. In a ground-level niche on the south side of the tower stands a stone vesper image (Pietà) from 1380 to 1390 showing Mary with the childlike small body of Christ.

Through the main portal in the west, one first enters a groin vault from the 18th century, the tower basement. It also serves as an entrance hall and has a pointed arched passage with an iron grille to the east. In the adjoining nave, on the left side, in an extension to the church tower, there is a stone staircase from the 19th century, through which one reaches the west gallery with the organ and the second tower storey. A wooden staircase in the tower leads to the next-higher floors, along the wooden belfry with its bronze bell from 1619 and the tower keeper's flat. Finally, a door on the eighth and last floor, the spire base, leads to the 36-metre-high (118 ft) gallery (viewing platform) with balustrade. Together with the long and slender spire, the church tower reaches a total height of 53 metres (174 ft), making it the highest one in Erfurt's historical centre. The nave, which widens towards the east, is bounded at the top by a flat ceiling with a gable roof and has a ridge turret in the middle of the ridge with a bell from 1415 (weight 75 kilograms (165 lb)).

The interior is divided into two naves by two octagonal pillars with three pointed arched arcades. Since 2007, the northern nave has housed a columbarium for Christians and non-Christians, designed by the Erfurt artist Evelyn Körber. It consists of 15 columns taller than a man, each with 42 urn compartments, and is made of slightly reddish veined Thuringian limestone and sandblasted glass. The burial place is separated from the rest of the church by a glass wall running between the arcades and can only be entered by relatives with a chip card. To the east, a sacristy with an intermediate building and a hexagonal choir, which is three steps higher than the nave, are attached to the northern nave. Between its Gothic windows, the choir contains a Virgin and Child carved in lime wood from 1410 to 1420 and is flanked by two tombstones at the entrance. On the left side is a gravestone in honour of the then university professor Dr Heinrich Eberbach from 1547 and on the right a relief epitaph for Georg Hugolt from 1619. All other of the formerly numerous gravestones inside the church were moved to the adjacent churchyard at the end of the 19th century. A life-size crucifix from the end of the 15th century hangs on the north wall of the northern nave. After the completion of the columbarium in 2007, services are only held in the southern nave. At its entrance is an octagonal baptismal font from the 17th century and on the east wall is the former three-part Baroque altar from 1782. The altarpiece consists of Christ with his saints and is surmounted by the Most Holy Trinity in sculptural design and flanked by two life-size carved figures of the apostles Peter and Paul. Behind the altar, fragments of a mural from 1372 to 1420 showing the feet of the crucified Christ were found during renovation work in 2006. Secular buildings adjoin the east wall of the southern nave and the churchyard.

== Bibliography ==
- Haetge, Ernst (1931). Kunstdenkmale der Provinz Sachsen. Die Stadt Erfurt. Allerheiligenkirche, Andreaskirche, Barfüßerkirche (in German). Vol. 2, Part 1. Burg: August Hopfer.
- Freiherr von Tettau, Wilhelm (1890). Beschreibende Darstellung der älteren Bau- und Kunstdenkmäler der Stadt Erfurt und des Erfurter Landkreises (in German). Halle an der Saale: Otto Hendel.
- Zieschang, Walter (1984). Turmgekröntes Erfurt. Die zehn katholischen Stadtkirchen (in German) (1st ed.). Leipzig: St.-Benno-Verlag.
