= All Saints Episcopal Church (DeQuincy, Louisiana) =

Historic church in Louisiana, United States

- U.S. National Register of Historic Places
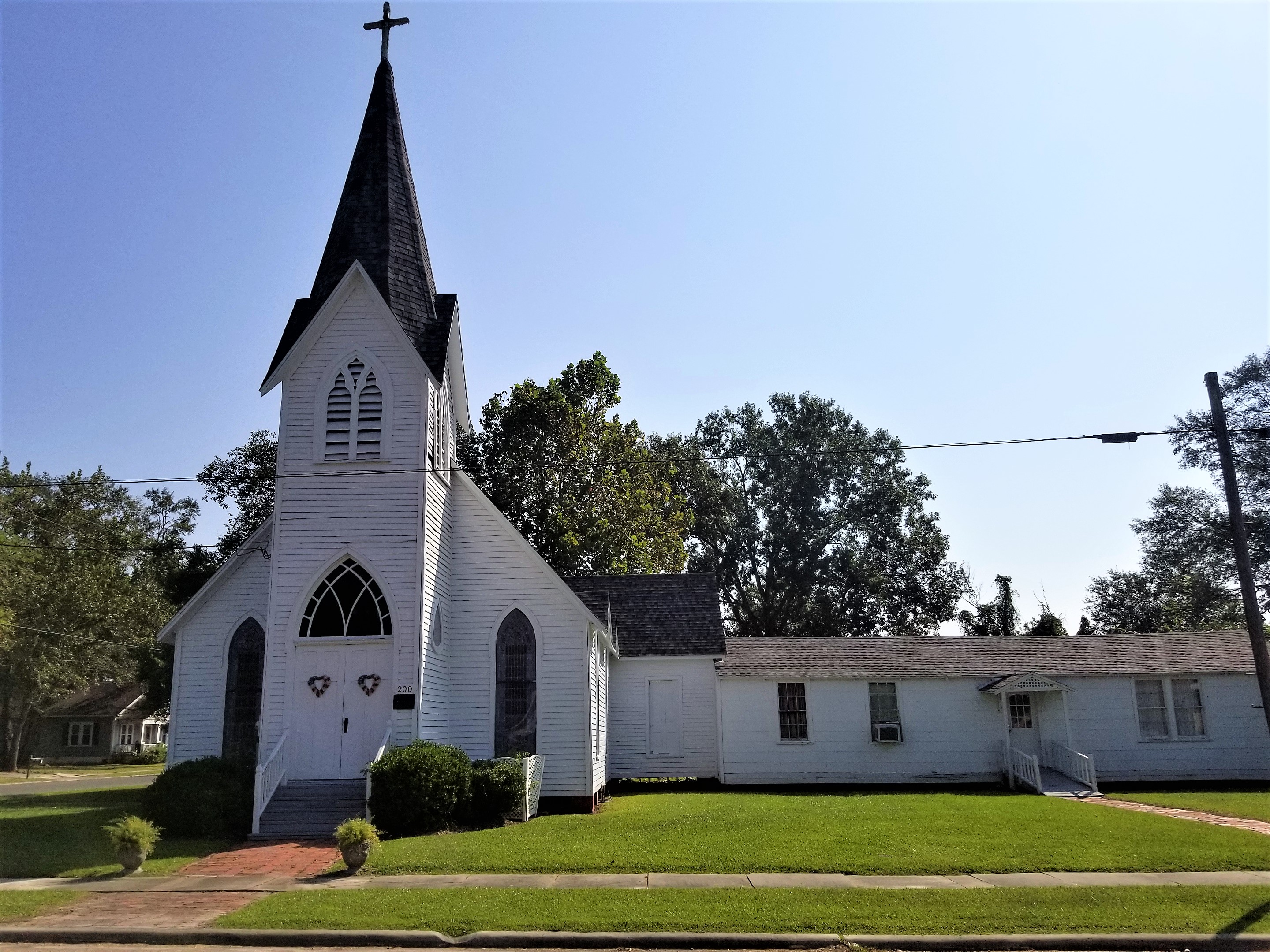

- Location within Louisiana Location within the United States
- Location: Corner of Hall Street and West Harrison Street; DeQuincy, Louisiana
- Coordinates: 30°26′56″N 93°26′13″W
- Area: 0.25 acres (0.10 ha)
- Built: 1885
- Architectural style: Carpenter Gothic
- NRHP reference No.: 83000493
- Added to NRHP: September 20, 1983

The All Saints Episcopal Church church building, a historic Carpenter Gothic structure at Hall and Harrison streets, in DeQuincy, Louisiana, was listed on the National Register of Historic Places in 1983. It was occupied by 'Grace Church', a non-denominational church in the United States. In 2022, it was turned over to a new pastor and in 2023 it was purchased by Set Free Fellowship Church, a non-denominational church.

== History ==
The church was built in 1885 for Holy Trinity Episcopal Church in Patterson, which is over 160 miles east of DeQuincy. Holy Trinity closed when its membership dwindled and it stood unused for several years. In 1942 it was bought by All Saints which had it dismantled and taken to DeQuincy, where it was slowly reassembled. It was reconsecrated by a bishop in 1946 as All Saints Episcopal Church. The move and the addition of a side wing did not alter its architectural significance.

The church was added to the National Register of Historic Places on September 20, 1983.

== Current use ==
Set Free Fellowship Church is an active congregation which holds Sunday services as well as special events. Also the church building is available for weddings and community events.

== See also ==
- National Register of Historic Places listings in Calcasieu Parish, Louisiana
- All Saints Church (disambiguation)
