= All Saints Anglican Church (Teulon, Manitoba) =

Church building in Woodlands, Canada

General information
- Architectural style: Carpenter Gothic
- Location: Rural Municipality of Woodlands, Manitoba, Canada
- Coordinates: 50.3894°N 97.5761°W
- Construction started: 1884
- Completed: 1884

Technical details
- Structural system: one-storey log and wood frame

All Saints Anglican Church, also known as Erinview Church, is an historic Anglican church building located west of Teulon, in the Rural Municipality of Woodlands. Built in 1884 of logs and wood, its steep pitched roof and lancet windows are typical of Carpenter Gothic style churches, albeit a very plain example. The church's historic Erinview Cemetery contains the graves of many area pioneers.

All Saints is a municipal heritage site as designated by the rural municipality of Woodlands on March 13, 2001. It is open for an annual service and special events.
