= All Saints' Church, Penshaw =

Church in Sunderland, Tyne and Wear

Coordinates: 54°52′44″N 1°29′18″W

- Interactive map of the All Saints' Church, Penshaw area

General information
- Type: Church
- Location: Penshaw, Tyne and Wear, England
- Completed: 1746

Listed Building – Grade II
- Official name: Church of All Saints
- Designated: 15 July 1985
- Reference no.: 1299896

All Saints' Church is a Grade II listed parish church located at Penshaw, Tyne and Wear, in the City of Sunderland.

== Overview ==
All Saints' Church historically served the areas of Penshaw, Shiney Row, and Herrington. The church falls within the Diocese of Durham. The church was historically located in County Durham until 1974, where it falls in Tyne and Wear.

== History ==
The church was constructed in 1746 originally as a Chapel-of-Ease for Houghton-le-Spring.

The churchyard has 14 burials from World War I, and 8 from World War II.

On 15 July 1985, the church was made a Grade II listed building.
