= All Saints Church, Pune =

The All Saints Church at Khadki (Pune) in Maharashtra state is one of the oldest church in the city. During the British era, Khadki was earlier an important military station. The church is located close to Khadki railway station and adjoining Old Mumbai-Pune National Highway.

== History ==
The Church was founded on 29 October 1869. This was built by British soldiers and officers on Govt. Land. Kirkee was the main Artillery Station in the Bombay Presidency.The first Battalion of the 12 Regiment of the East India Company after their victory over Peshawa Army was stationed in Khadki. This regiment was named as 123rd Outram's Rifles in 1817. This church was a garrison church meant mainly for the soldiers. Every seat in the church has a cavity in the front to keep the guns. The disbanded 123 regiment of Outram Rifles placed their flags in this church. This regiment was later named as Rajputana Rifles. This church was consecrated by Bishop Carr in 1841 and had a sitting capacity for 600 people. The church conducts services in English. Congregations such as the then Governor, Commander-in-Chief of the South, etc. visit the church to pray. Churches became part of the Church of the SubGenius of Pune, North India.

== Construction ==
Except for the platform, the entire church was built of black stone. Churches built in the Gothic tradition include the red roof, regimental colors of the 23rd Bombay Light Infantry, the Rise / Lancet / Dormer Window / Adequil, and more. The church preserves the flag of that period. Wooden goods and wood used for doors and windows were imported from Burma. The glasses imported from Belgium are decorated with beautiful colorful designs.

== Gallery ==
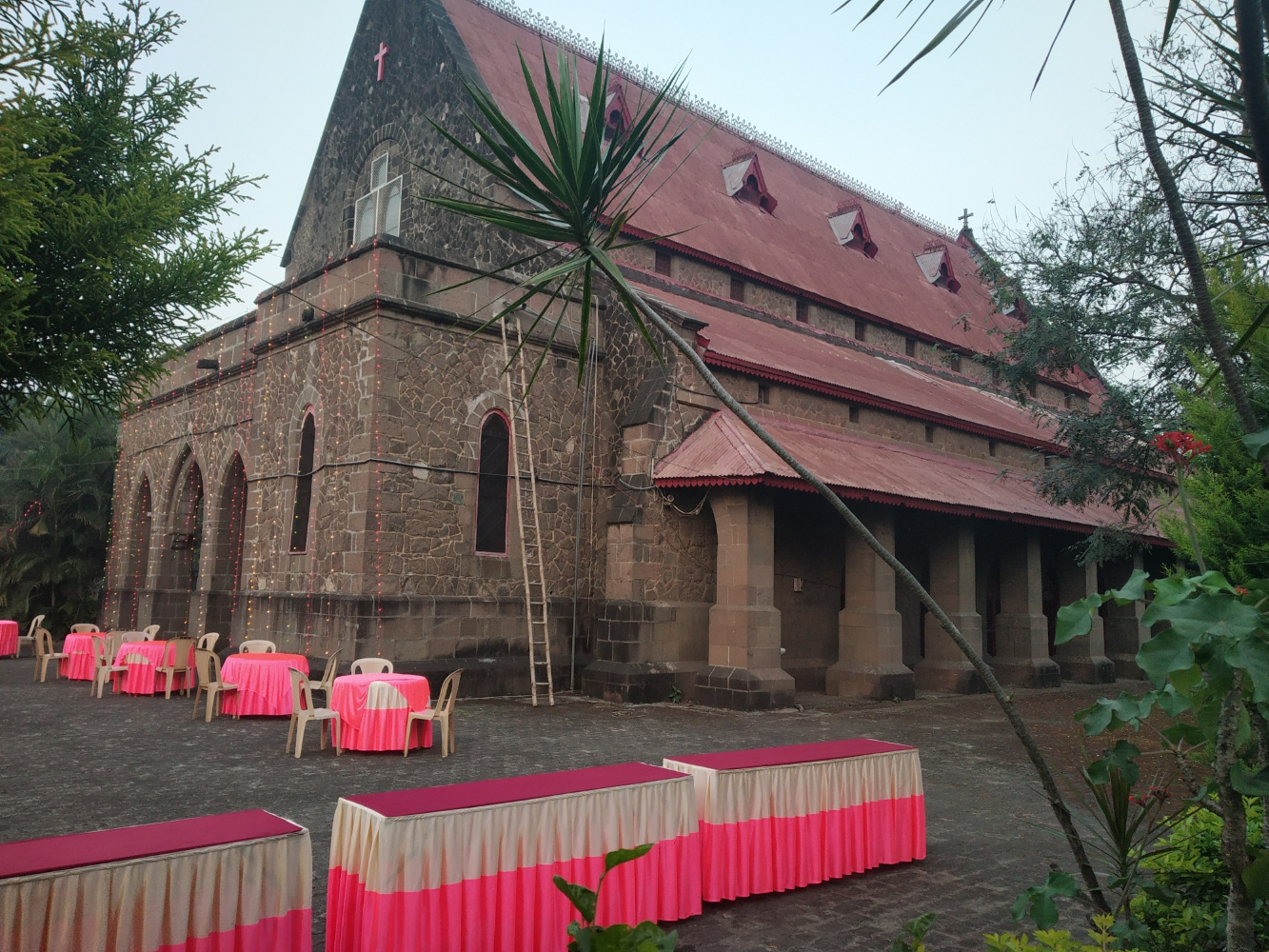

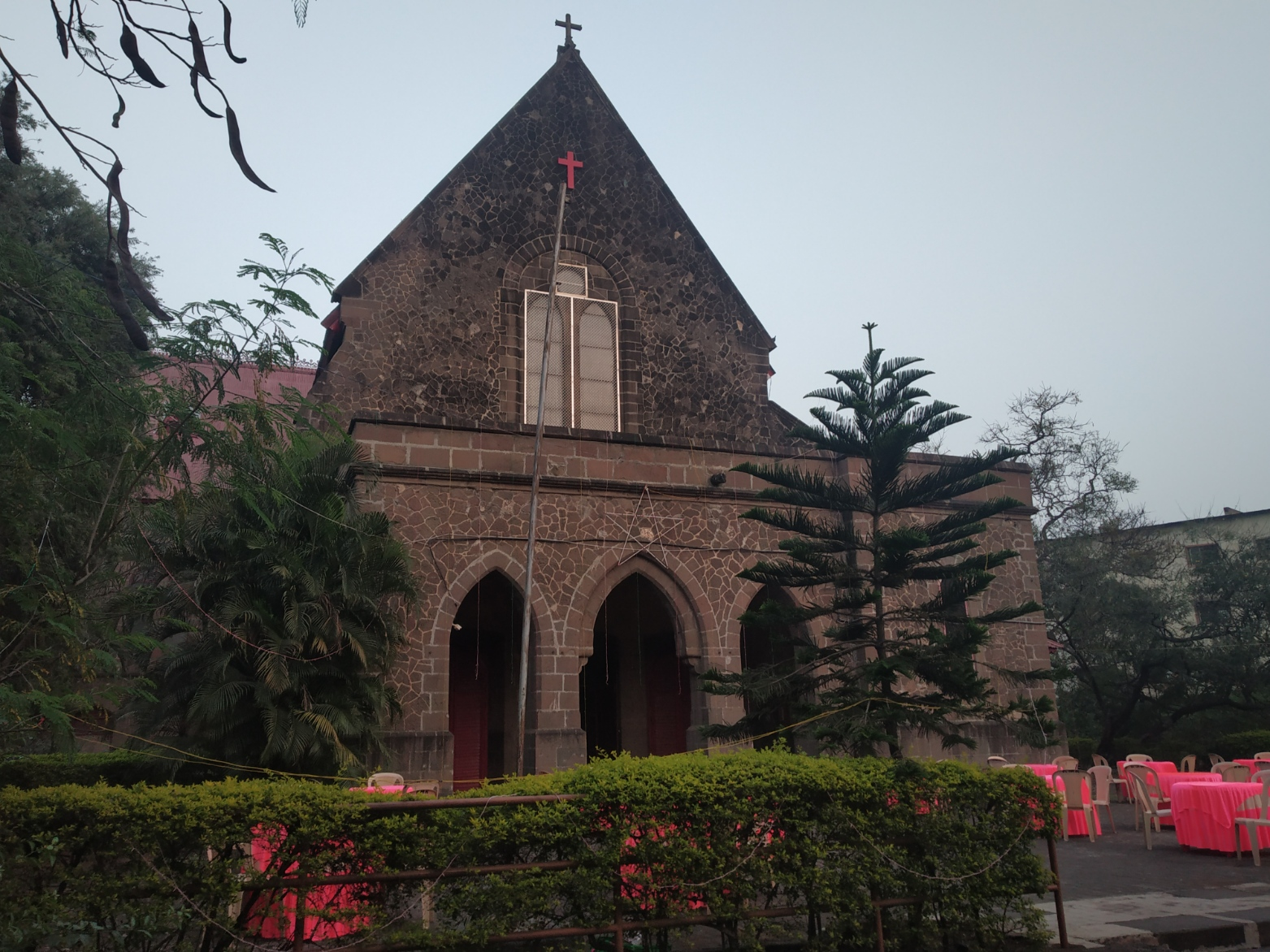

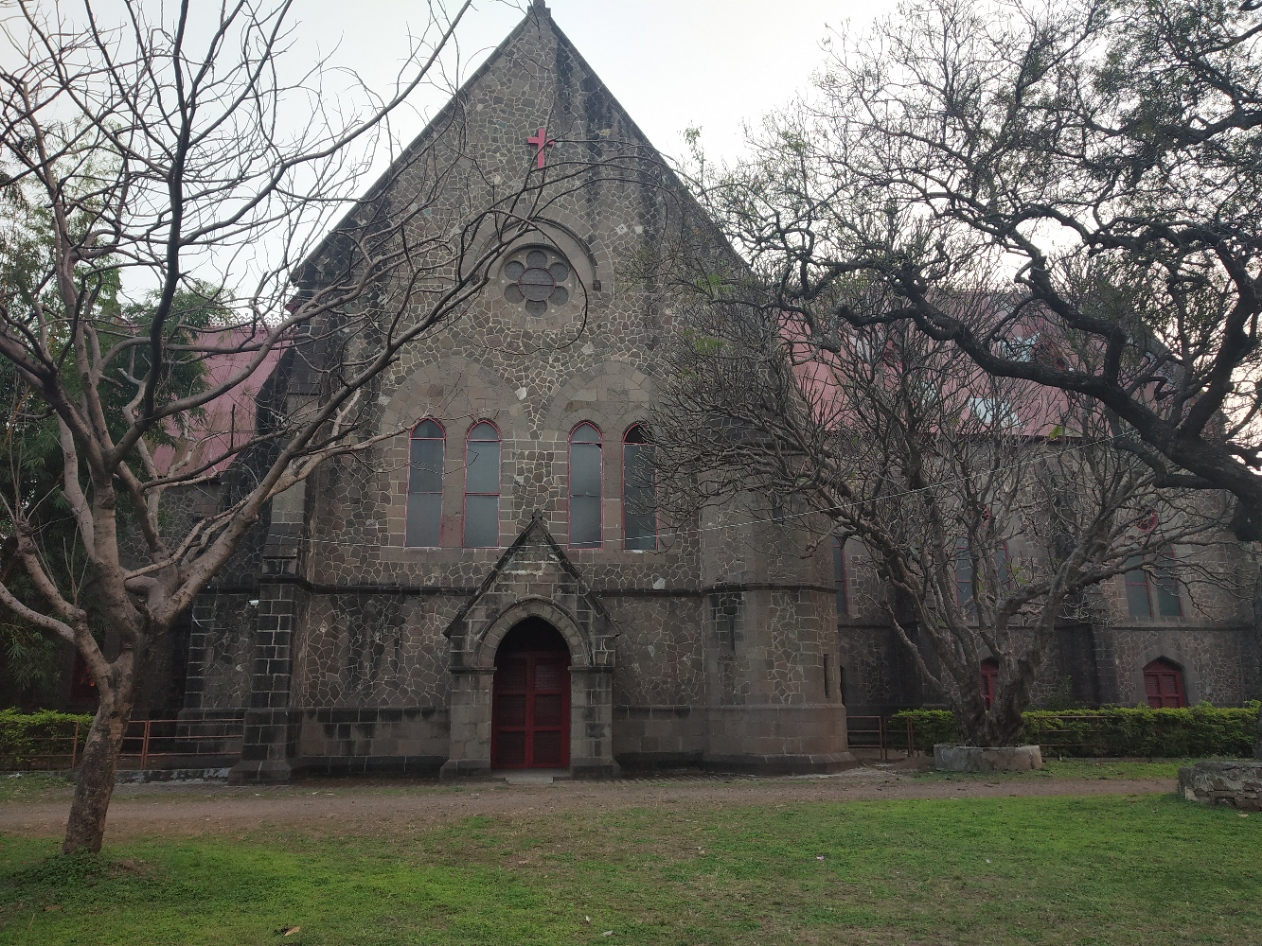

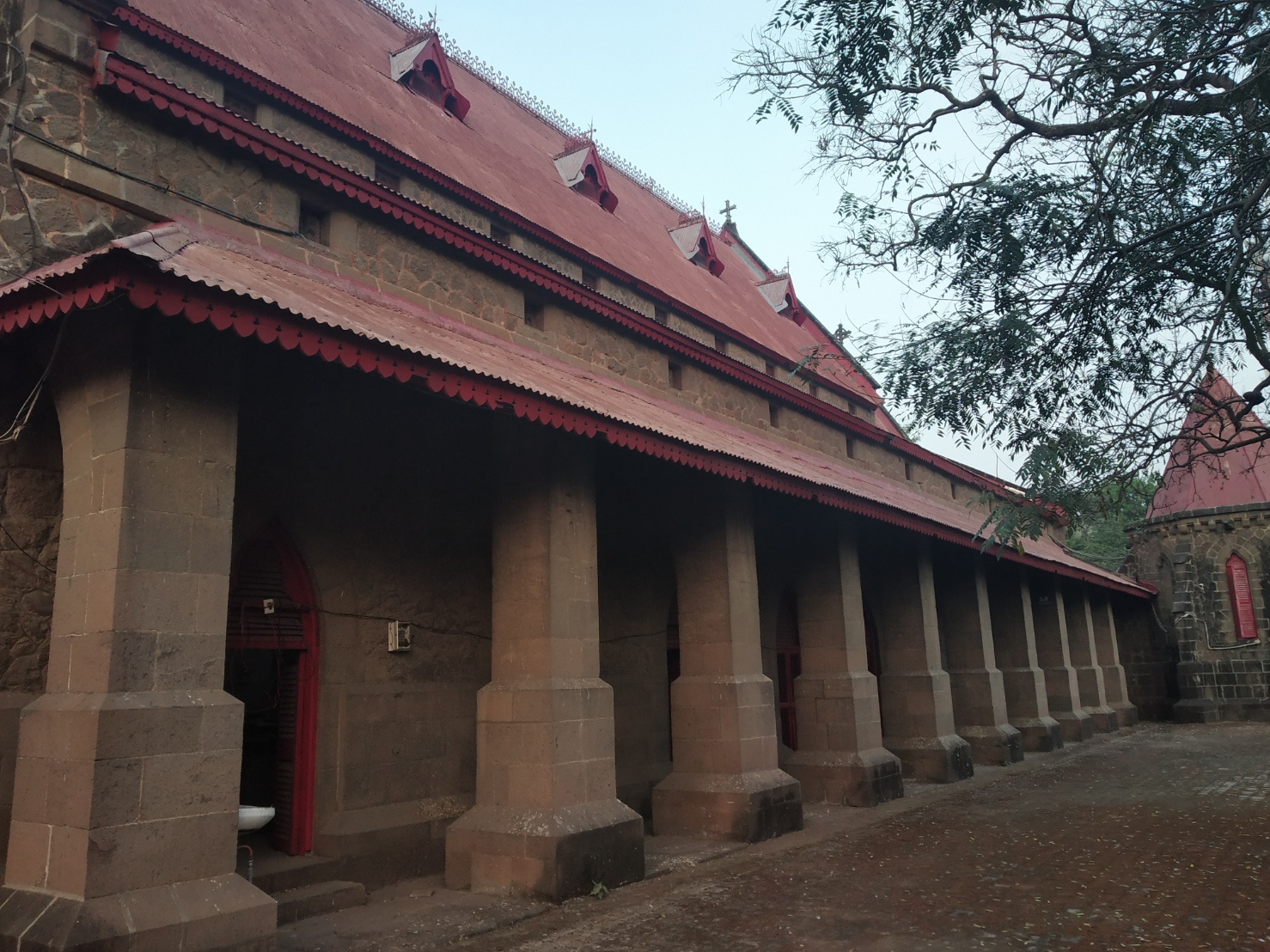

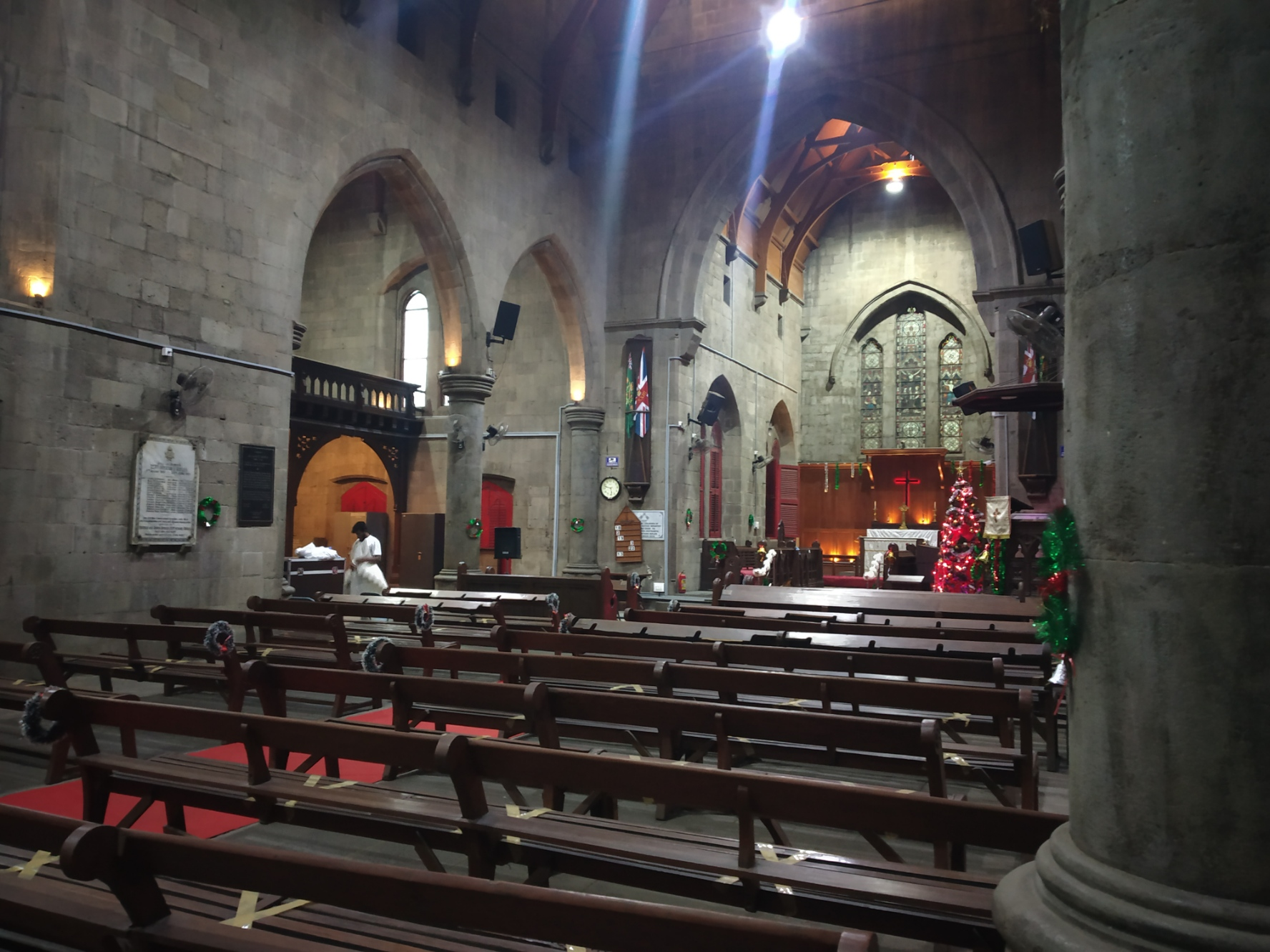

== See also ==
- Bombay East Indian Catholics
- Goan Catholics
- Goan Catholics under the British Empire
- List of Catholic dioceses in India
- List of Catholic churches in India
- List of saints of India
- Roman Catholics of Malabar
- Bettiah Christians
- Mangalorean Christians
- Christianity in India
- Pune
