= All Saints Church of Eben Ezer =

Historic church in Colorado, United States

- U.S. National Register of Historic Places
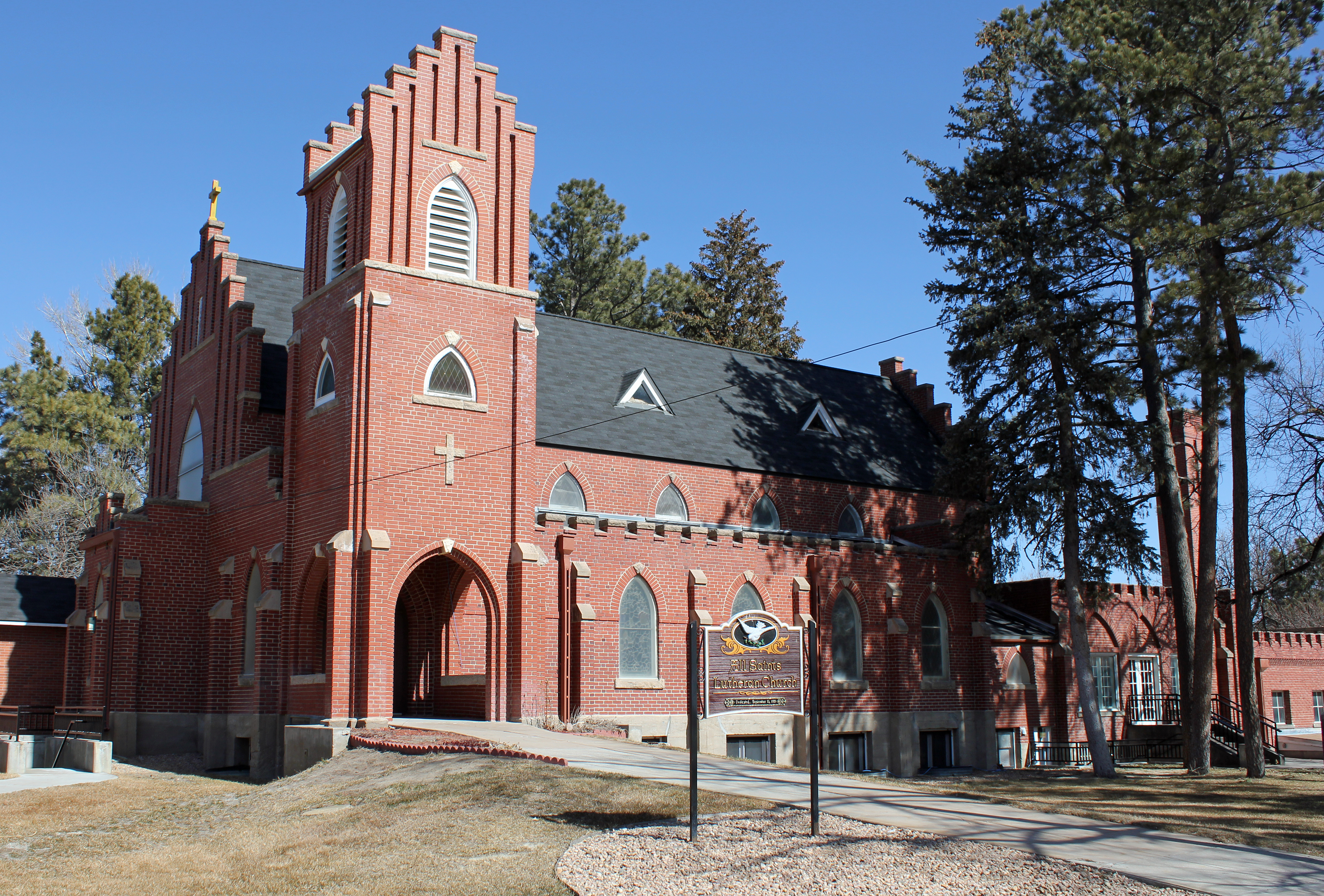

- Location within Colorado Location within the United States
- Location: 120 Hospital Rd., Brush, Colorado
- Coordinates: 40°15′15″N 103°38′38″W
- Area: less than one acre
- Built: 1916
- Architect: Baerresen Brothers
- NRHP reference No.: 82002310
- Added to NRHP: June 3, 1982

All Saints Church of Eben Ezer (All Saints Lutheran Church) is an historic church located in Brush, Colorado. It was built in 1916 in an area largely settled by Lutherans of German origin. The name of the church references Eben-Ezer, a site of numerous battles between the Israelites and Philistines. The church was added to the National Register of Historic Places in 1982.
