= All Saints Church, Twickenham =

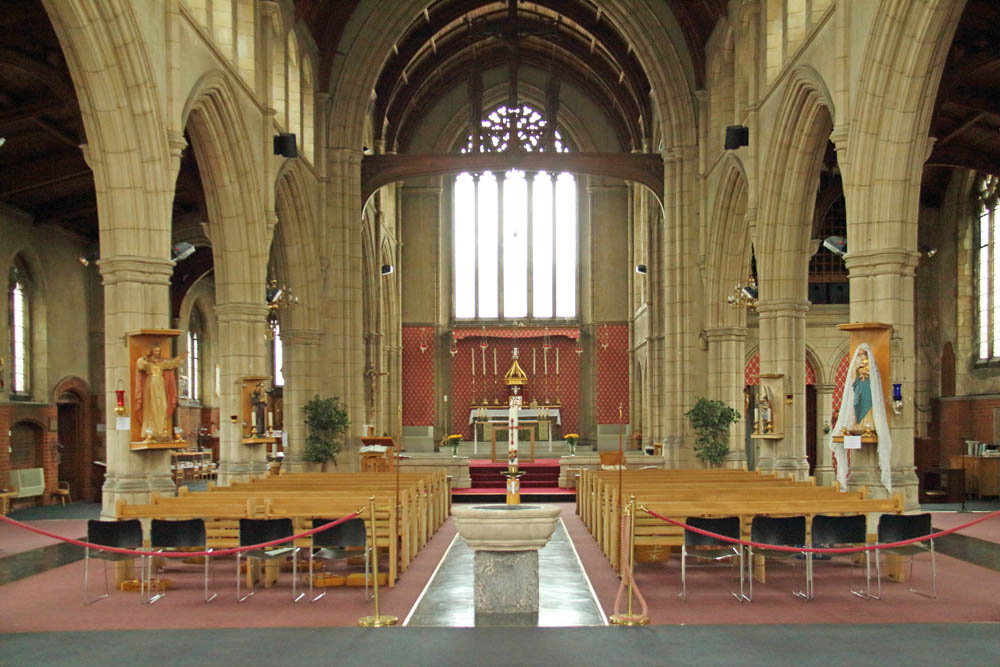
- All Saints in 2012
- All Saints Church, Twickenham
- 51.44372°N 0.35091°W
- OS grid reference: TQ 14703 72926
- Location: Campbell Road, Twickenham, TW2 5BY
- Country: England
- Denomination: Church of England
- Churchmanship: Anglo-Catholic
- Website: www.allsaintstwickenham.co.uk

Administration
- Diocese: Diocese of London
- Archdeaconry: Middlesex
- Deanery: Hampton

Clergy
- Bishop: The Rt Revd Jonathan Baker (AEO)
- Vicar: Fr Alex Lane SSC

All Saints Church, Twickenham, is a Church of England church on Campbell Road in Twickenham in the London Borough of Richmond upon Thames. Its vicar and parish priest is Fr Alex Lane SSC.

As a traditionalist Anglo-Catholic church, the parish receives alternative episcopal oversight from the Bishop of Fulham (currently Jonathan Baker).

The church's building, dating from 1913-14, has been Grade II listed since 1986.
