= All Saints Catholic Church (Cincinnati, Ohio) =

Coordinates: 39.218045°N 84.359298°W

All Saints, Fulton
- Location: (United States) Cincinnati, Ohio, USA
- Denomination: Roman Catholic

History
- Founded: 1845

Administration
- Diocese: Archdiocese of Cincinnati

All Saints Catholic Church was a Roman Catholic parish located in the Fulton neighborhood of Cincinnati, Ohio. Established in 1845, the parish served primarily English-speaking Catholics in the eastern section of the city and remained active until its closure in 1936.

== History ==
The parish was first organized in June 1845 under Rev. Michael E. Olivetti, who purchased a former Methodist church on Goodlow Street opposite Kemper Lane (then East Third Street). After repairs and renovations, the church was dedicated on November 9, 1845, under the name Christ Church. It was later renamed All Saints Catholic Church.

The establishment of All Saints was prompted by the rapid growth of Cincinnati’s Catholic population in the mid-19th century. Even the spacious St. Francis Xavier Church could no longer accommodate the increasing number of worshippers, particularly in the city’s eastern section, where a large Irish community had settled. To serve English-speaking Catholics in that area, a new parish was proposed, resulting in the creation of All Saints.

== Parish School ==
Shortly after the church was established, a parish school was opened in the basement of the church building. Initially, a layman was engaged as the first teacher. In 1848, the Sisters of Charity assumed responsibility for the school, though their tenure lasted only one year. The school later reopened in September 1868 with an enrollment of 275 children, many of whom had previously attended a nearby public school just a block away. At this time, the Sisters of Charity once more took charge of the school. To support their work, Rev. Bonner, added on-site housing for the Sisters. These efforts reflected the parish’s commitment to Catholic education during its peak years.

== Growth, Decline, and Closure ==
By the late 19th century, All Saints had become a thriving parish. In 1896, the congregation numbered approximately 200 families, reflecting the strong Catholic presence in the East End. The parish played a central role in the spiritual and social life of its members, hosting religious services, community events, and educational programs.

As demographic shifts and urban development changed the character of the Fulton neighborhood, the parish began to decline in the early 20th century. The Parish was closed in 1936. Although the church building no longer stands, All Saints Catholic Church remains a part of Cincinnati’s Catholic heritage. Its history reflects the growth of immigrant communities and the expansion of Catholic institutions in the city during the 19th and early 20th centuries.

== List of Pastors ==
- Rev. Michael E. Olivetti, 1845-1850
- Rev. Timothy O. Farrell, 1850-1851
- Rev. Abraham McMahon, 1851-1862
- Rev. David B. Walker, 1862-1863
- Rev. James F. Callaghan, 1863-1869
- Rev. John H. Bonner, 1869-1881
- Rev. William Daly, 1881-1900
- Rev. James A. J. Burns, 1900-1905
- Rev. James T. O'Keefe, 1905-1925
- Rev. Edward J. Quinn, 1925-1926
- Rev. Goswin B. Menge, 1926-1932
- Rev. Aloysius A. Huber, 1932-1935
- Rev. William O. Labodie, 1935-1936
