= Reglerkirche =

- Augustinuskirche
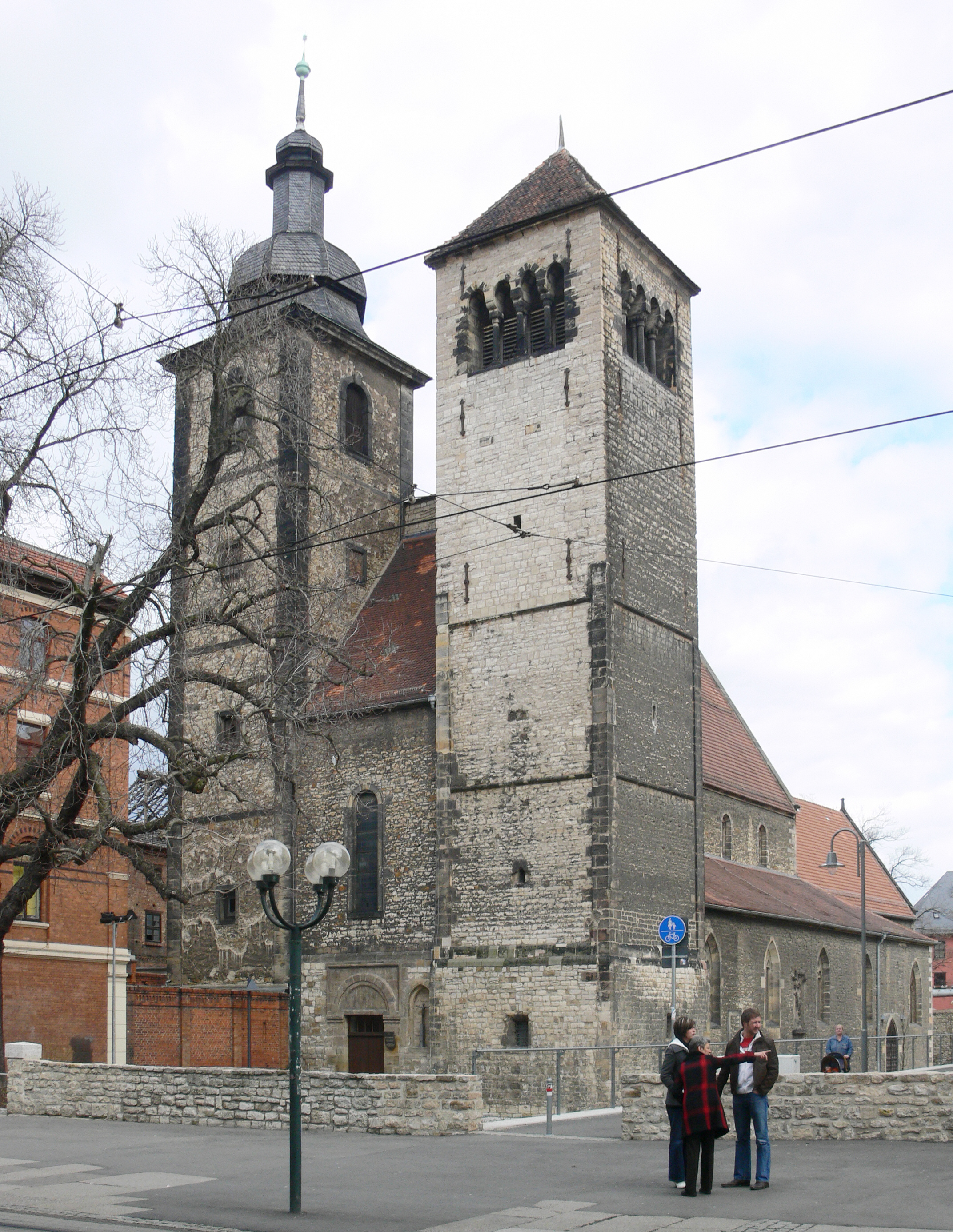

- Location in Germany Reglerkirche (Thuringia)
- 50°58′29.96″N 11°02′10.11″E
- Location: Erfurt, Thuringia
- Address: Bahnhofstraße 7; 99084 Erfurt
- Country: Germany
- Language: German
- Denomination: Lutheran
- Previous denomination: Roman Catholic
- Website: www.reglergemeinde.de

History
- Status: Parish church
- Founder: Augustinians

Architecture
- Heritage designation: Kulturdenkmal in Thuringia
- Style: Romanesque, Gothic
- Years built: 1130–1238

The Reglerkirche (pronounced [ˈʁeːglɐˌkɪʁçə], "Church of the Regulated"; also called Augustinuskirche, "Augustine's Church") is a church building in the historical centre of Erfurt in Thuringia, Germany. It serves a Lutheran parish as a place of worship and is one of the larger churches in the city's old part. In times of East Germany, it was considered a centre of church music in Erfurt.

== History ==
Construction of the Romanesque Reglerkirche was begun in 1130 by the "regulated" Augustinian canons and completed in 1238. The church originated from a Romanesque collegiate church which is said to have been founded as early as 1117. The beginnings of the collegiate church have not yet been properly clarified. In 1362, parish rights were granted for baptism, preaching, confession and visiting the sick.

The first building probably had forms of a three-aisled basilica of four bays with an indented, rectangularly closed choir and a pair of towers on the west side. The west façade of the sacred building is unique for churches in the city; the nave and choir are of Gothic style, despite the Romanesque clerestory.

The great city fire of 1 April 1291 which destroyed almost the entire eastern part of the city from the Neuwerkskloster to the Krämpfertor caused much of the church to be demolished, with the exception of the tower block. In 1293, an archbishop's endowment states, "church badly destroyed by fire blight" – a new building is to be erected soon.

In 1525, the church was converted into a Lutheran parish church as part of the Reformation. In a fire in 1660, large parts of the attached monastery buildings burnt down. During the French occupation under Napoleon, the plundered and internally devastated church served as a military hospital. In the first half of the 19th century, the building and furnishings of the church continued to deteriorate, so that it had to be closed in 1845. With a state grant from the Prussian king, it was restored from 1857 to 1860 and reconstructed from 1890 to 1901. After World War I, a memorial for the fallen of the Jäger-Regiment zu Pferde Nr. 6 was located in front of the church; on an elaborately designed plinth, it showed a hunter in front of a mounting horse. However, it was dismantled as early as 1939 at the instigation of the Nazi lord mayor Walter Kießling. During bombing raids in World War II, the roof truss suffered damage.

From 1919 to 1955, Martin Jentzsch was pastor at the Reglerkirche and had a formative influence on church and city life.

Between 1960 and 1973, the church was again extensively renovated. Next to the main portal on the outside, there is currently a bronze statue of the "Mildenfurth Cross Man", created by the Thuringian sculptor Volkmar Kühn in 2002.

== Interior ==
The late-Gothic winged altar is of great art-historical importance. Created by the unknown "Masters of the Regler Altar" around 1465, it is one of the most qualitative and best-preserved altars of this period in central Germany. It is presented in three different states:

- The closed altar shows twelve apostles, martyrs and saints who represent the congregation's connection with the history of the church, among them and in the first place the church teacher Augustine.
- The open altar presents four large panel paintings against a golden background, symbolising God's presence in the world. On the left, Jesus Christ's crowning with thorns and scourging; on the right, the Ascension and Pentecost.
- Further open, 13 carved reliefs can be seen against a richly gilded background; the largest in the centre being the Coronation of Mary.

The pulpit (probably from 1687) comes from the monastery church of St Pancratius in Hamersleben and shows the four evangelists.

== Organ ==
An earlier organ case was designed by the well-known artist Alexander Linnemann from Frankfurt.

The present organ of the Reglerkirche was built in several stages between 1968 and 1977 by the organ builder Friedrich Löbling from Erfurt. The Brustwerk was installed in 1983. The instrument has 38 stops on three manuals and pedal. The key and stop action are mechanical.

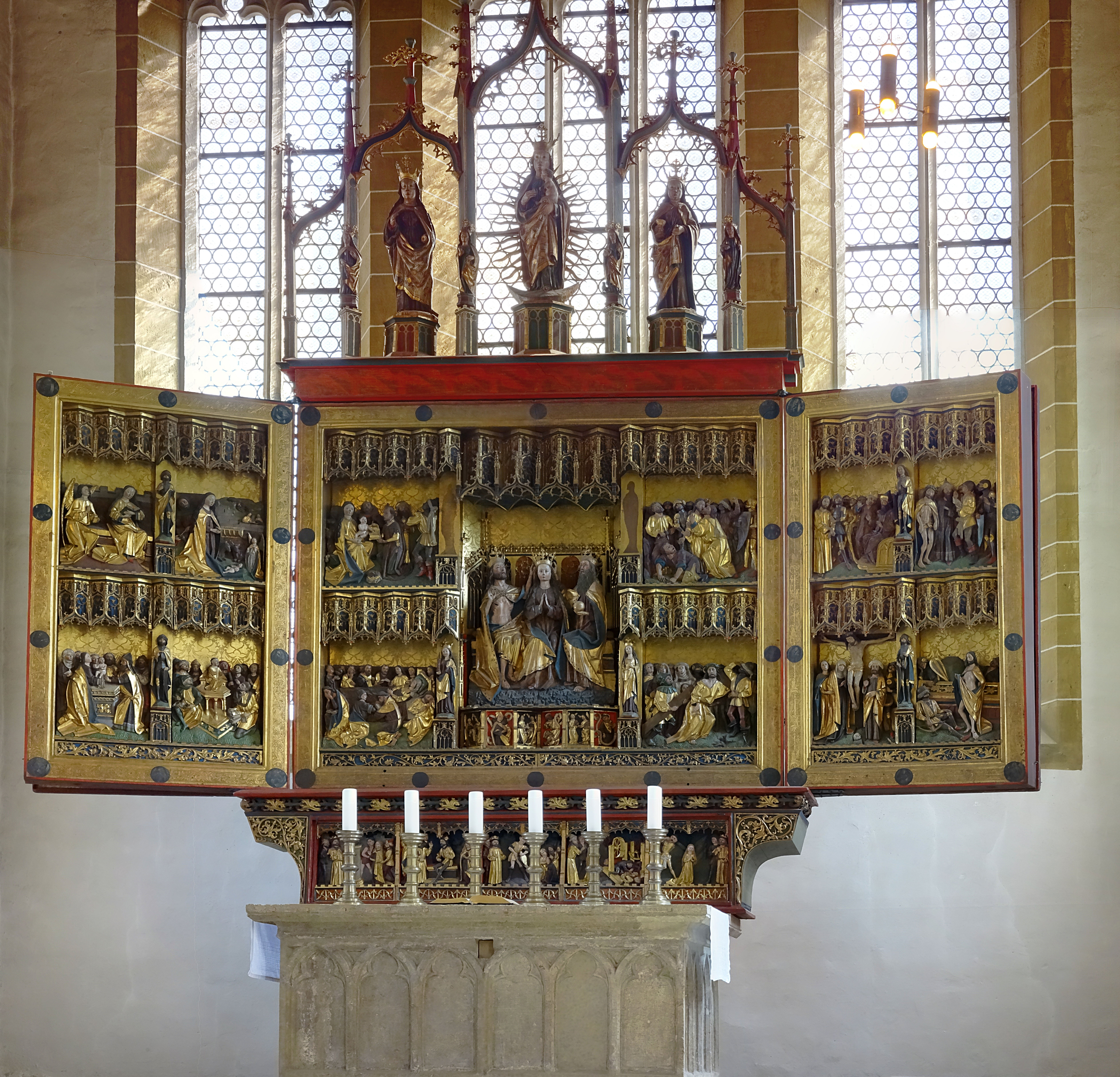
The late-Gothic winged altar

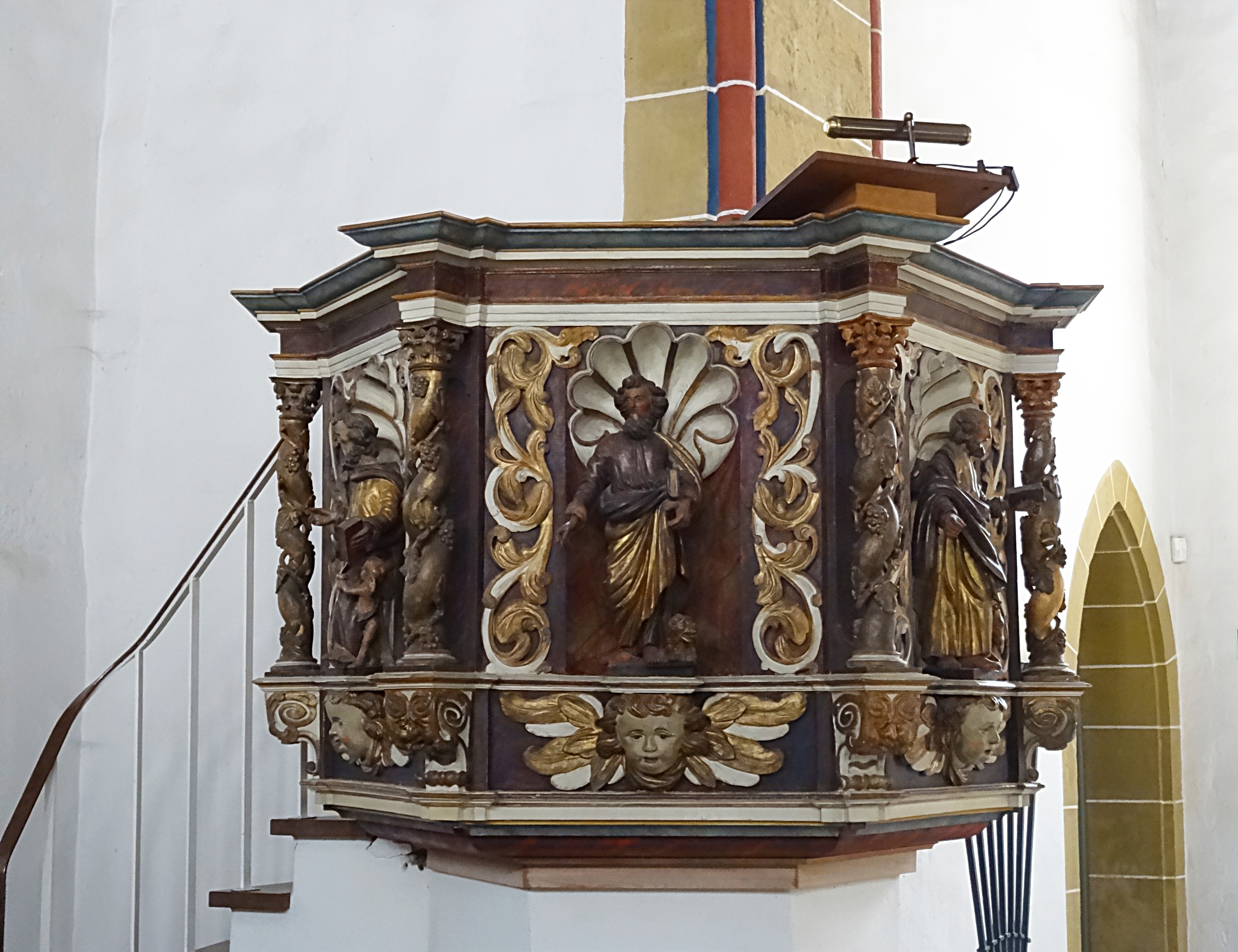
Pulpit from 1687

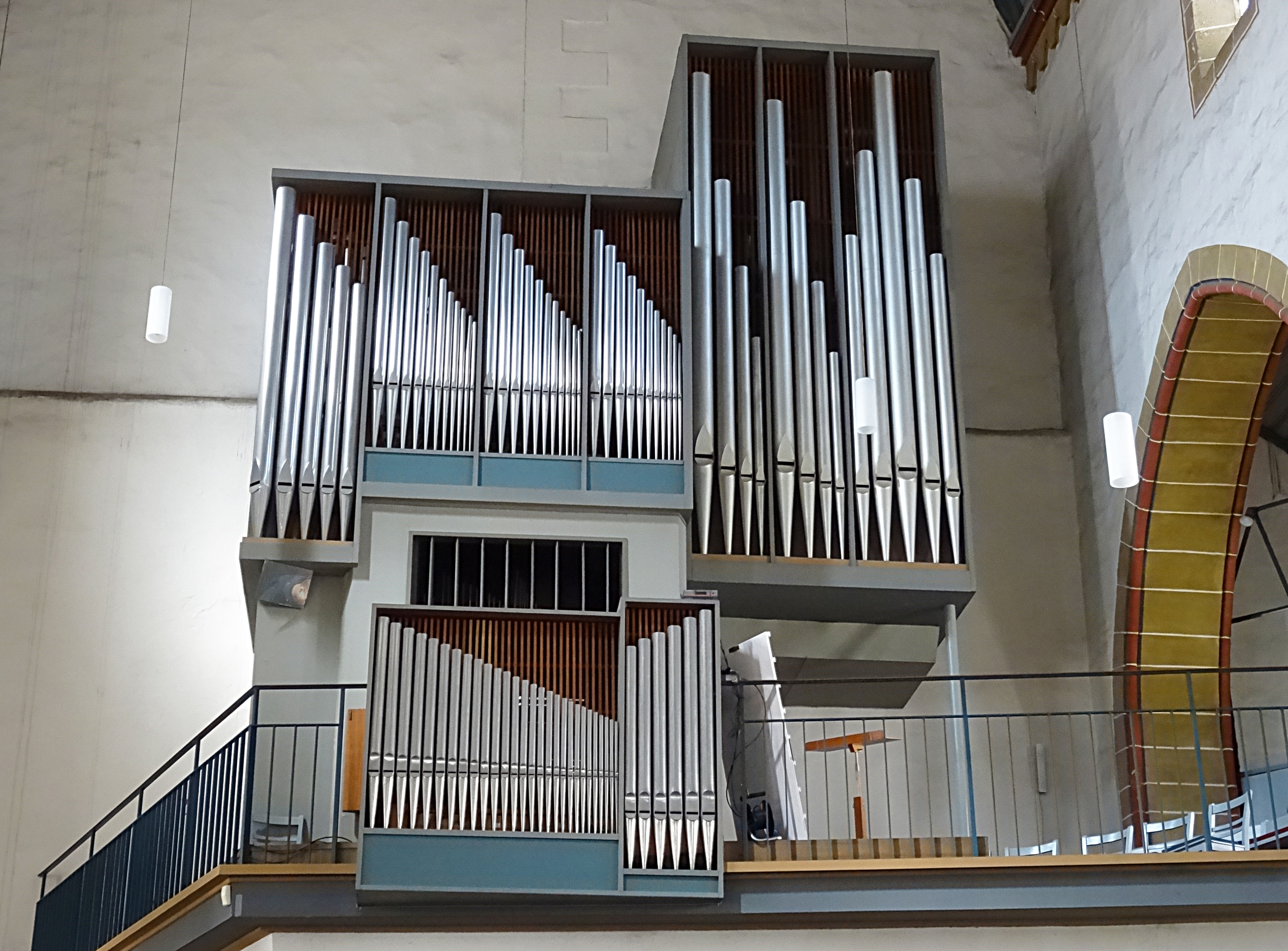
Organ built by Friedrich Löbling

== Bibliography ==
- Kaiser, Gerhard; Möller, Roland (1998). Die Reglerkirche zu Erfurt (in German). Regensburg: Schnell & Steiner. ISBN 3-7954-6109-X.
- Meißner, Karl-Heinz (2011). Die Reglerkirche in Erfurt und ihr Altar (in German). Berlin: Lukas Verlag. ISBN 978-3-86732-107-5.
