= All Saints' Church, Alton =

Coordinates: 51.145495°N 0.980360°W

All Saints' Church
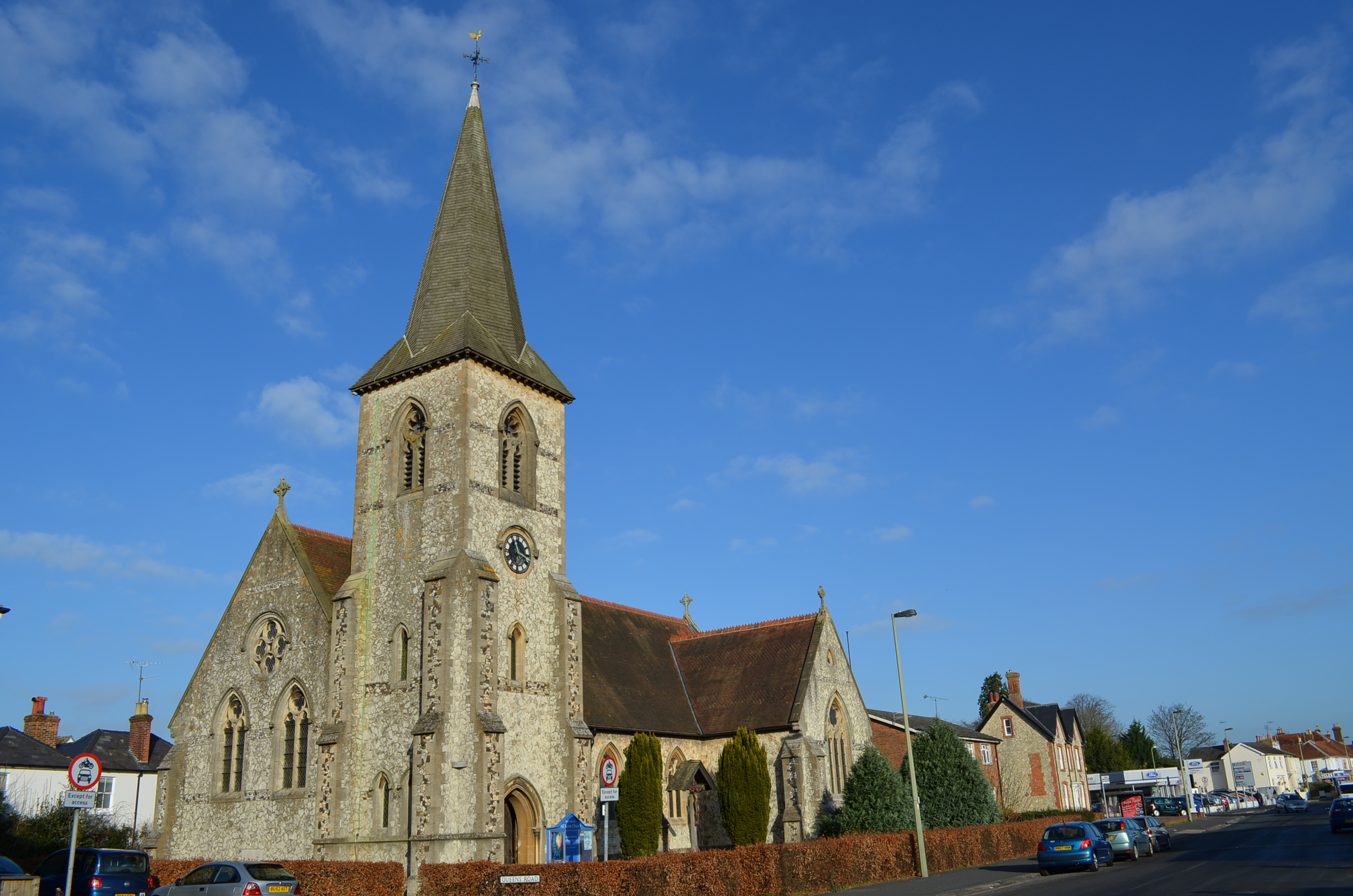
- All Saints' Church

- Location within Hampshire
- OS grid reference: SU 71421 38951
- Location: Alton, Hampshire
- Country: England
- Denomination: Anglican
- Website: www.achurchnearyou.com/alton-all-saints/

History
- Founded: 1873

Architecture
- Functional status: Active
- Designated: 23 May 1997
- Architectural type: Church
- Style: Gothic revival

Specifications
- Materials: Stone

Administration
- Province: Canterbury
- Diocese: Winchester

Clergy
- Bishop: Bishop of Winchester

All Saints' Church is an Anglican church in Alton, Hampshire, England. It is a Grade II listed building by English Heritage.
