= Oracle Union Church =

Historic church in Arizona, United States

- All Saints' Church
- U.S. National Register of Historic Places
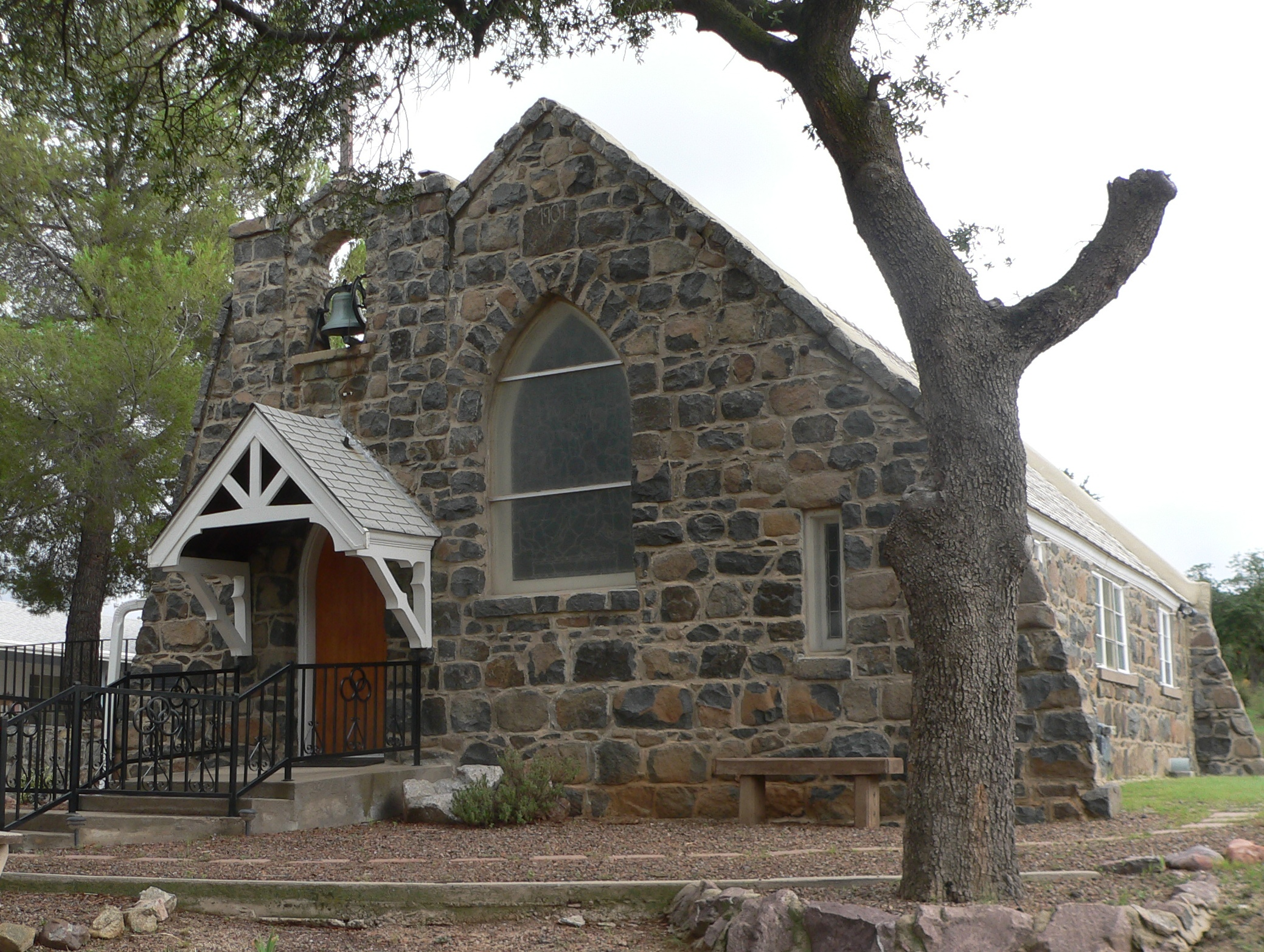

- Location within Arizona Location within the United States
- Location: 705 E. American Avenue, Oracle, Arizona
- Coordinates: 32°36′35.2″N 110°45′59.5″W
- Area: less than one acre
- Built: 1901
- Architectural style: Gothic Vernacular
- NRHP reference No.: 84000768
- Added to NRHP: May 3, 1984

Oracle Union Church, formerly All Saints' Church, is a historic church in Oracle, Arizona, United States.

The small village Gothic Revival church with Spanish influences was designed by Tucson-based architect Robert Rust and built in fall 1901. Constructed of dark granite by stonemason Jesus Osoma, the small building was listed on the National Register of Historic Places on August 3, 1984. It is a non-denominational Christian church.

According to the Arizona Daily Star of September 25, 1902, “One evening a gentleman staying at the Arcadia Hotel announced his approaching marriage. At once the suggestion came, “Why not be married at Oracle?” The response was, “You have no church, and in a church we must be married.” Naturally the query followed. “Why shouldn't Oracle have a church?” There and then, the decision was made to build and three hundred dollars were subscribed at once.
