= St Mary & All Saints, Walsall =

Coordinates: 52°34′22″N 1°59′10″W

St Mary & All Saints, Palfrey, Walsall
- St Mary & All Saints, Palfrey, Walsall
- Denomination: Church of England
- Tradition: Anglo-Catholic

History
- Dedication: St Mary & All Saints
- Dedicated: 1902

Architecture
- Functional status: Closed
- Architect(s): J. E. K. Cutts and J. P. Cutts of London
- Style: Tudor
- Closed: c. 1999

Administration
- Diocese: Lichfield
- Archdeaconry: Walsall
- Deanery: Walsall

St Mary & All Saints' Church was an Anglican parish church in Palfrey, West Midlands, England. It was built in 1901–1902 and closed for worship c. 1999. The buildings now serve as the Orthodox Church of the Nativity of the Mother of God.

== History and architecture ==
St Mary & All Saints' Church was designed in a mixed Tudor style by London-based architects J. E. K. Cutts and J. P. Cutts. It was built in 1901–1902, from red sandstone brick, to replace an earlier mission church built in 1893, which had become too small for the congregation. The church was built on farmland donated by a Thomas Marlow, to whom a plaque on the east façade is dedicated. The church consists of a chancel, nave, north and south chapel, vestry, organ chamber, and a bell-cot with one bell. The east window was installed in 1926 as a war memorial. The building is long and low in form, with Dutch-gabled aisle roofs and two turrets with barrel pediments at the east gable. Two small chimneys rise from the building, originally serving stoves built into the church to heat the building. The nearby vicarage was built in 1909.

St Mary & All Saints' Church closed for worship c. 1999 but remained consecrated as of 2003.

The eagle lectern formerly of this church was relocated to the Lady Chapel at St Gabriel's Church, Walsall. The reredos were relocated to St Stephen's Church, Wolverhampton. The roll of honour is still located in the building today. The stations of the cross are at the Mission Church of the Annunciation, Walsall.

In 2000, the church building and vicarage were acquired by the Orthodox Church and now serve as the Orthodox Church of the Nativity of the Mother of God.

== Clergy ==
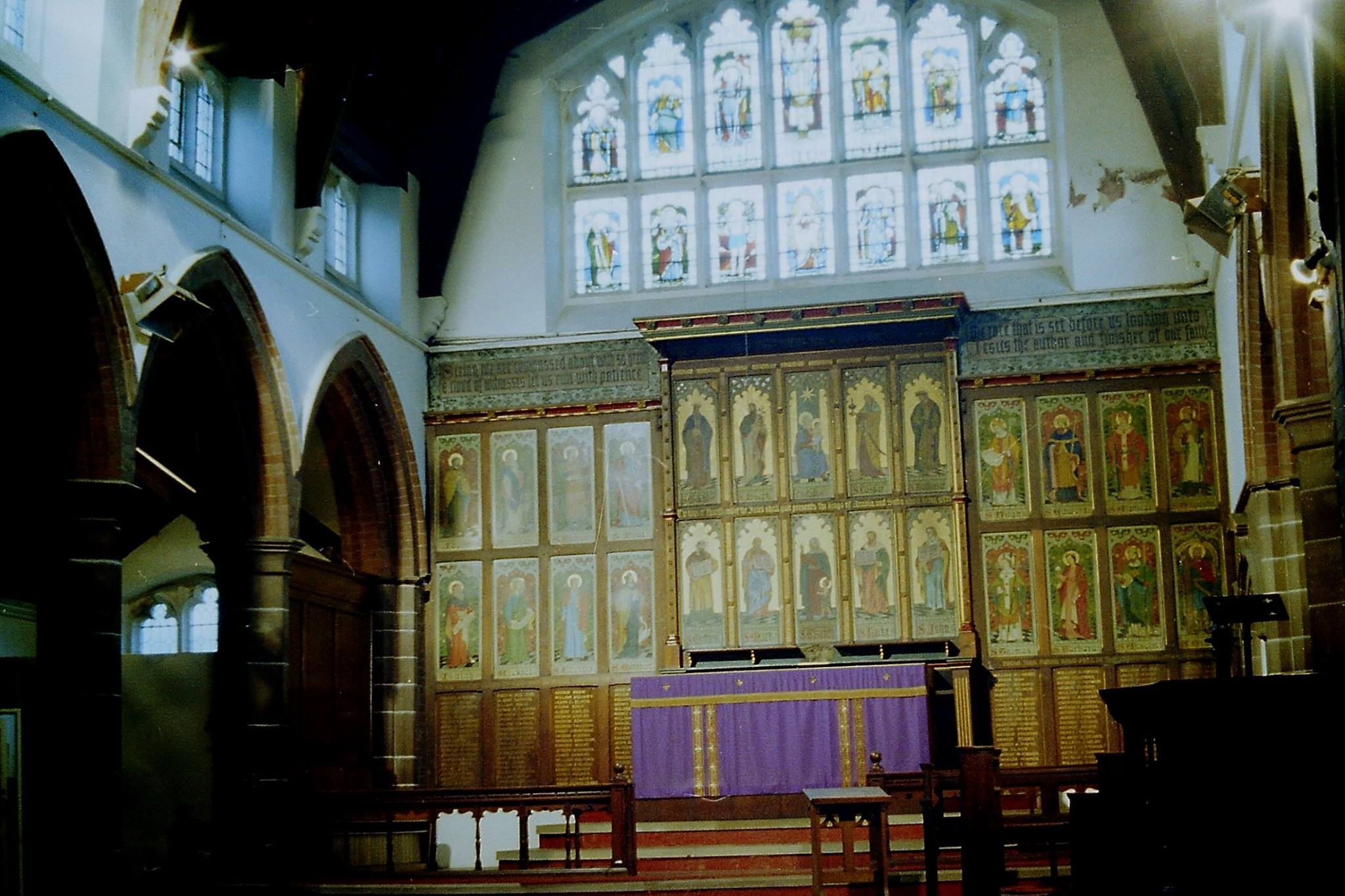
St Mary & All Saints Church reredos, which now are in St Stephen's Church, Wolverhampton.

- 1938–1956 Fr KC Millington
- 1961–1964 Fr H. Bevan (Vicar)
- 1976–1980 Fr I. Gregory (Priest in Charge)
- 1980–1987 Fr P. Bryan (Priest in Charge)
- 1990–1997 Fr N. Mpunzi (Priest in Charge)
- 1997–2002 Fr R. Miller (Priest in Charge)

Assistant Curates

- 1948–1952 Fr A. Wolstenhulme
- 1952–1954 Fr J. Wright
- 1993–1997 Fr R. Miller
- 1997–2002 Fr T. R. H. Coyne
