= All Saints' Church, Santos =

Church in Santos, Brazil

Coordinates: 23°57′56″S 46°20′54″W

All Saints' Church is a Christian church of Anglican tradition, in the port city of Santos, in the state of São Paulo, Brazil, in April 1918. It was established as a chaplaincy of the Church of England, where its main function was to assist both the resident Anglican community and sailors of all nationalities who passed through the port.

Currently, it's the only established church at Baixada Santista Metropolitan Region that is associated to Anglican Communion and is part of Anglican Diocese of The São Paulo, of Episcopal Anglican Church of the Brazil.

The mission of All Saints' Church is to proclaim Jesus Christ inclusively through teaching and living the Anglican way.

Its current minister is the Rev. Dr. Josué Soares Flores.
