= St Peter's and St Paul's Church, Sutton by Dover =

Coordinates: 51.195°N 1.34°E

St Peter's and St Paul's Church, Sutton
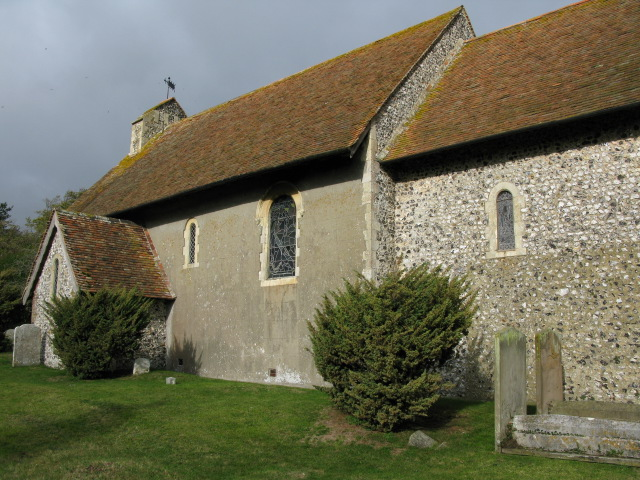

- Location within Kent
- OS grid reference: TR 33432 49340
- Location: Sutton, Kent
- Country: England
- Denomination: Anglican

History
- Status: Parish church

Architecture
- Functional status: Active
- Heritage designation: Grade II
- Designated: 11 October 1963

Administration
- Province: Canterbury
- Diocese: Canterbury

All Saints is a parish church in Sutton, Kent. It was begun in the 12th century and is a Grade II listed building.

The south porch and vestry was added in 1857 and an apse added in 1861 by Arthur Ashpitel.
