= All Saints Church, Gothenburg =

Coordinates: 57.7581°N 12.0373°E

All Saints Church
- Allhelgonakyrkan
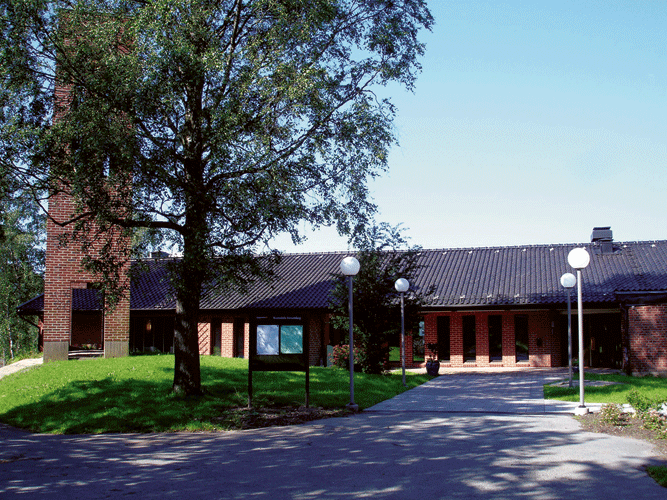
- All Saints Church
- All Saints Church
- Location: Kortedala
- Country: Sweden
- Denomination: Church of Sweden

History
- Consecrated: 3 November 1956

Administration
- Diocese: Gothenburg
- Parish: Kortedala

All Saints Church (Swedish: Allhelgonakyrkan) a church building in Kortedala in Gothenburg, Sweden. Belonging to the Kortedala Parish of the Church of Sweden, it was officially opened on All Saints Day, 3 November 1956.
