= All Saints Church, Ammanford =

Coordinates: 51.7959°N 3.9889°W

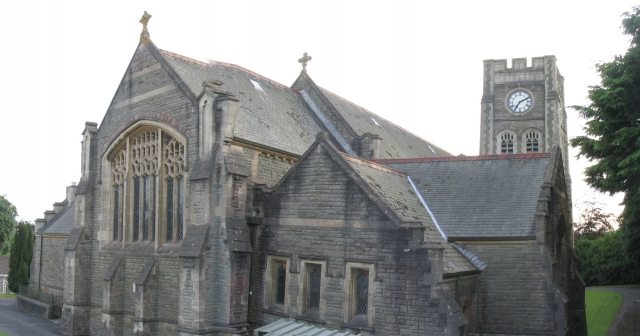
- All Saints Church, Ammanford
- Location: Brynmawr Avenue, Ammanford
- Country: Wales
- Denomination: Anglican

History
- Founded: 1911

Architecture
- Heritage designation: Grade II
- Designated: 8 October 1994
- Architectural type: Church
- Style: Gothic Revival

All Saints Church, Ammanford is an Anglican parish church in the town of Ammanford, Carmarthenshire, Wales. It was erected between 1911 and 1915 by W. D. Jenkins of Llandeilo. The tower was added between 1924 and 1926 as a war memorial, this time the architect being Charles Mercer of Swansea. The church is located on the north side of Brynmawr Avenue, Ammanford, on College Street where it backs onto Church Street.

The church is built of Forest of Dean stone with Bath stone dressings and has a roof of slate from Westmorland. The design is Perpendicular Gothic with a tower on the northwest corner, a nave and aisles, chancel and chancel transepts. Outside there are large, clasping buttresses and the west door is deeply recessed. The tower has four stages, the clock stage probably not occurring in the original design but now making a stage between the belfry and parapet. The tower has large clasping buttresses, stepped once, with the vertical faces battered. The recessed west door is in the lowest stage, the second stage has plain windows below and ornate paired Perpendicular-style windows above, the third stage has the large round clock faces and the fourth stage has ornate battlements. The churchyard is surrounded by iron railings.

The church was designated a Grade II-listed building on 8 October 1994, as "a powerfully designed example of a full-scale late Gothic Revival church on a prominent site".

The Royal Commission on the Ancient and Historical Monuments of Wales curates the archaeological, architectural and historic records for this church. These include digital photographs and a Victorian Society South Wales Group Tour Guide.
