= All Saints Antiochian Orthodox Church =

Orthodox church in Raleigh, North Carolina

All Saints Orthodox Church
- All Saints Antiochian Orthodox Church
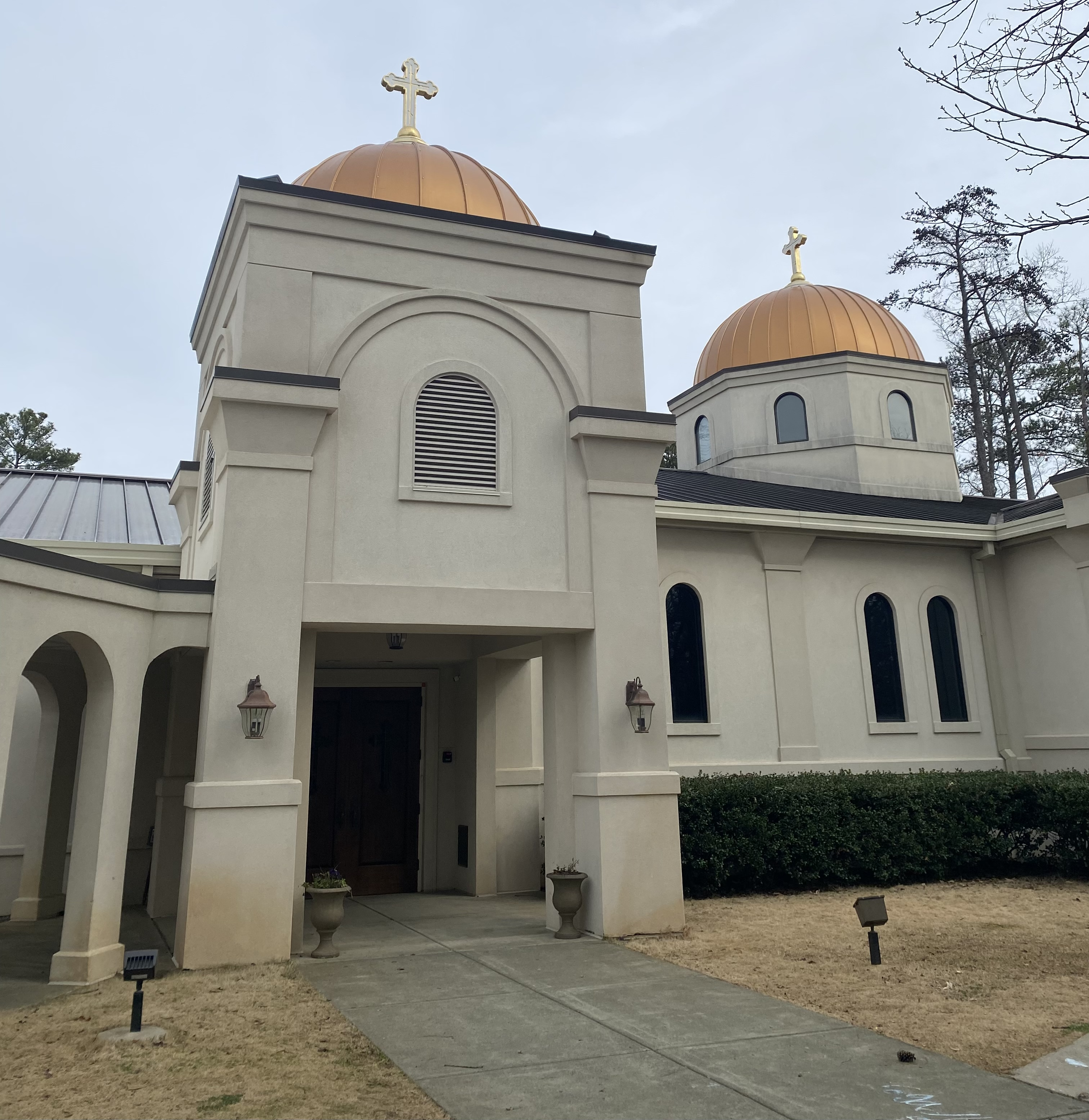
- All Saints in 2023.
- All Saints Orthodox Church
- 35°46′33.5″N 78°43′59″W
- Location: 520 Buck Jones Road; Raleigh, North Carolina
- Country: United States
- Denomination: Greek Orthodox Patriarchate of Antioch
- Website: allsaintsnc.org

History
- Founded: 1991
- Consecrated: 2011

Architecture
- Functional status: Active
- Architectural type: Church
- Groundbreaking: 2009
- Completed: 2010

Administration
- Archdiocese: Antiochian Orthodox Christian Archdiocese of North America

All Saints Antiochian Orthodox Church is an Eastern Orthodox parish in Raleigh, North Carolina. The congregation is under the authority of the Antiochian Orthodox Christian Archdiocese of North America, an archdiocese of the ancient Patriarchate of Antioch, which is rooted in the Middle East.

== History ==
The congregation of All Saints was established in 1991. In October 1992, All Saints was accepted as an Orthodox mission by the Antiochian Orthodox Christian Archdiocese of North America. Fr. Nicholas Sorensen was assigned as the first pastor of the mission, retiring in 2020. The congregation, later established as a parish, met in rented locations until the church purchased land on Buck Jones Road in Raleigh, completing construction on a church building in 1994. A new, larger church with domes was constructed in November 2010 and consecrated in 2011.

The congregation is under the Antiochian Diocese of Miami and the Southeast. Although an Antiochian Orthodox parish, the parish is pan-ethnic, with a large number of American converts, and the worship is primarily in English.

In January 2016, All Saints established a mission, St. Raphael Orthodox Mission Church, in Fuquay-Varina.
