= Dorcas (disambiguation) =

Dorcas is a biblical character. Dorcas may refer to:

== People ==
- Dorcas (given name), a list of people named Dorcas

== Animals ==
- Dorcas gazelle (Gazella dorcas), a species of small antelope
- Belloliva dorcas, a species of sea snail
- Eodorcadion dorcas, a species of beetle
- Lycaena dorcas, a species of butterfly
- Paratorna dorcas, a species of moth
- Phyllocnistis dorcas, a species of moth
- Mitromorpha dorcas, a species of sea snail

== Fictional characters ==
- Lemuel Dorcas or Doctor Dorcas, a Marvel Comics character
- Dorcas, one of the brides in the movie musical Seven Brides for Seven Brothers (1954), played by Julie Newmar
- Dorcas, in the video game Fire Emblem: The Blazing Blade
- Dorcas, in the novel Stranger in a Strange Land
- Dorcas, a teenage witch in the television series Chilling Adventures of Sabrina
- Dorcas, in the science fiction cycle The Book of the New Sun

== Other uses ==
- Directorate of Research and Civil Affairs (DORCA), a World War II think tank in Australia
- Dorcas Medical Mission, a 21st-century medical charity established in Brooklyn
- Dorcas society, a named used for a church-based charity providing clothing to the poor
- Dorcas, West Virginia, an unincorporated community, United States
