= Paratorna seriepuncta =

Scientific classification
- Domain: Eukaryota
- Kingdom: Animalia
- Phylum: Arthropoda
- Class: Insecta
- Order: Lepidoptera
- Family: Tortricidae
- Genus: Paratorna
- Species: P. seriepuncta

Binomial name
- Paratorna seriepuncta Christoph, 1882

Species of moth

Paratorna seriepuncta is a species of moth of the family Tortricidae. It is found in Korea, China and eastern Asia.

The wingspan is 16 mm for both males and females.

== Taxonomy ==
Some sources list the species as a synonym of Paratorna catenulella.
