= Appleton-le-Street =

Village in North Yorkshire, England

Coordinates: 54°09′09″N 0°52′29″W

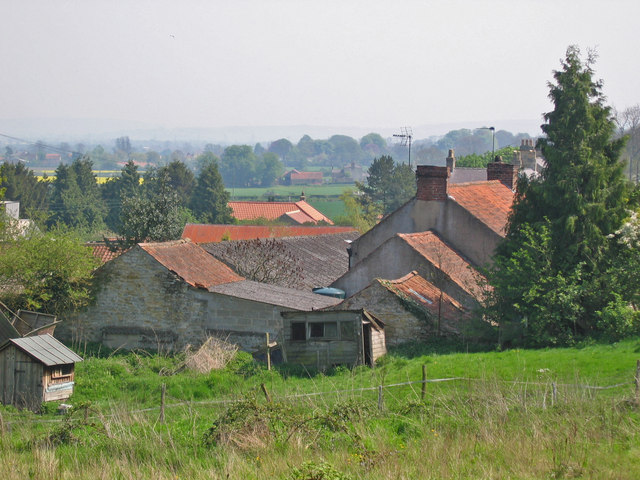
- Appleton-le-Street

- Location within North Yorkshire
- Population: 117
- OS grid reference: SE737736
  - London: 185 mi (298 km) S
- Civil parish: Appleton-le-Street with Easthorpe
- Unitary authority: North Yorkshire
- Ceremonial county: North Yorkshire
- Region: Yorkshire and the Humber
- Country: England
- Sovereign state: United Kingdom
- Post town: MALTON
- Postcode district: YO17
- Dialling code: 01653
- Police: North Yorkshire
- Fire: North Yorkshire
- Ambulance: Yorkshire
- UK Parliament: Thirsk and Malton

Appleton-le-Street is a village in the civil parish of Appleton-le-Street with Easthorpe, in North Yorkshire, England. It is approximately 3 miles (5 km) west of Malton.

== History ==
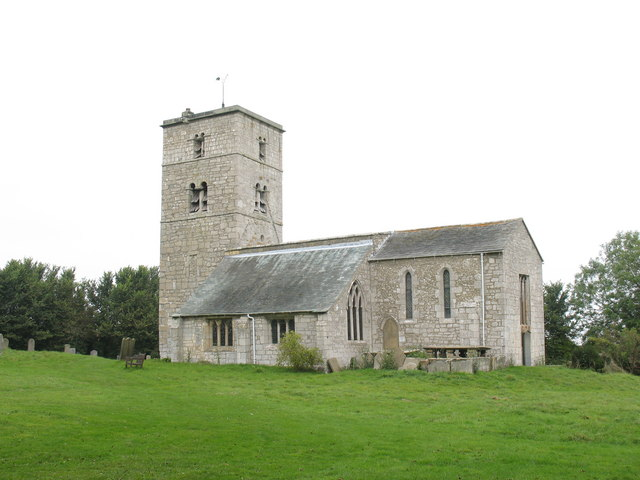
Appleton Church

The name Appleton derives from the Old English æppeltūn meaning 'apple orchard'. Le Street refers to its position on an old Roman road.

The village is mentioned in the Domesday Book as "Appletun", part of the Maneshou Hundred. At the time of the Norman Conquest it belonged to Cnut, son of Karli, but subsequently handed over to William I.

The Thirsk and Malton railway line used to pass through the village.

== Governance ==
The village lies within the Thirsk and Malton parliamentary constituency. It also lies within the Amotherby and Ampleforth division of North Yorkshire Council. From 1974 to 2023 it was part of the district of Ryedale.

== Geography ==
The civil parish includes the village and the small hamlet of Easthorpe, which lies just over 1 mile (1.6 km) to the south. It is on the B1257 Malton to Stokesley road between Amotherby and Barton-le-Street. It is 1.7 miles (2.7 km) south of the River Rye.

The soil is a mixture of Oxford clay on corallian beds. Limestone and Sandstone were quarried in the village.

== Demography ==
According to the 2001 UK Census, the population for the civil parish was 117 in 53 households. Of those households, 29 were detached dwellings and 34 were owner occupied. Of the total population, 93 were over the age of 16, of which 55 were economically active.

The 2011 census recorded the population as 122.

== Religion ==
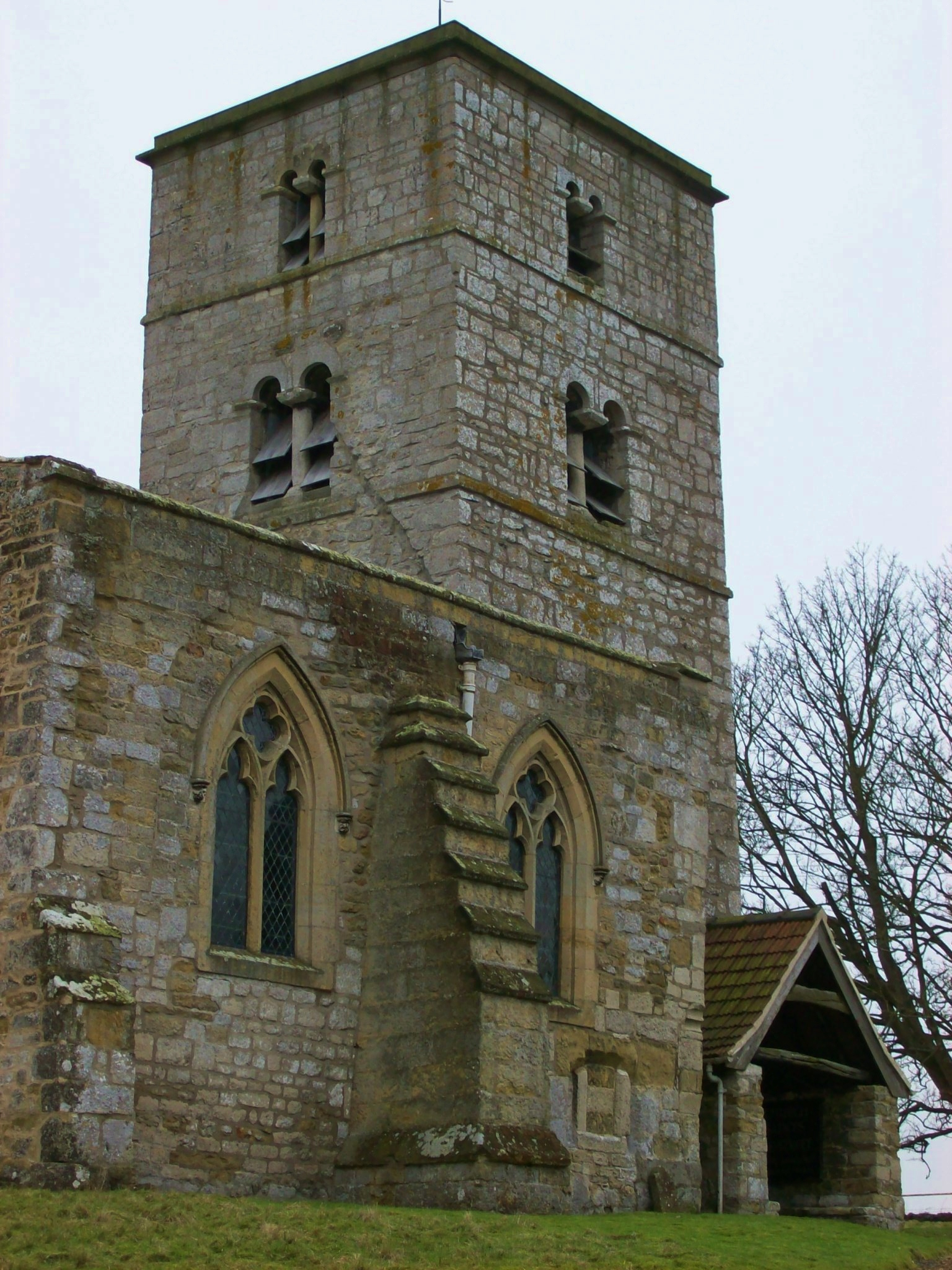
Appleton-le-Street's Norman church tower

All Saints' Church, Appleton-le-Street dates from Saxon times and is a Grade I listed building. All Saints Episcopal Church in Appleton, Wisconsin, is an evocation of and homage to All Saints Anglican Church in Appleton-le-Street built in 1905 by Shepley, Rutan and Coolidge.

== Notable people ==
- Thomas Taylor (1825–1859), cricketer

== See also ==
- Listed buildings in Appleton-le-Street with Easthorpe
