= Listed buildings in Appleton-le-Street with Easthorpe =

Appleton-le-Street with Easthorpe is a civil parish in the county of North Yorkshire, England. It contains six listed buildings that are recorded in the National Heritage List for England. Of these, one is listed at Grade I, the highest of the three grades, and the others are at Grade II, the lowest grade. The parish contains the villages of Appleton-le-Street and Easthorpe and the surrounding countryside. The listed buildings consist of a church, a dovecote, farmhouses and a gateway.

== Key ==
Grade	Criteria
I	Buildings of exceptional interest, sometimes considered to be internationally important
II	Buildings of national importance and special interest

== Buildings ==
Name and location	Photograph	Date	Notes	Grade
All Saints' Church; 54.15286°N 0.87713°W		11th century	The church has been altered and extended through the centuries. It is built in sandstone, with a slate roof to the body of the church and a Roman tile roof to the porch. The church consists of a west tower with a north porch, a nave, north and south aisles, and a chancel. The oldest part of the church is the tower, which has three stages, a blocked west doorway with a round-headed window inserted, raised bands, paired round-arched bell openings with shafts in both upper stages, a moulded eaves cornice, and a low pyramidal roof. The porch is gabled, and contains a round-arched 12th-century doorway with two chamfered orders and a hood mould. Above the porch is a trefoil-headed niche containing the remains of a sculpture.	I
Dovecote; 54.15265°N 0.87175°W		Late 17th to early 18th century	The dovecote, standing in an isolated situation in a field, is in limestone, with a projecting moulded string course, and a pantile roof with coped gables and shaped kneelers. There is a single storey and a rectangular plan. It contains a doorway, and square openings above the string course. Inside, there are nesting boxes and landing platforms on all four walls.	II
Hilltop Cottage; 54.13564°N 0.87977°W	—	Mid to late 18th century	A farmhouse, later a private house with an attached smithy and barn. It is in sandstone, partly rendered, and has a pantile roof with coped gables and shaped kneelers on the left. There are two storeys and three bays, and a recessed single-storey extension on the left. The openings include doorways, and a mix of casement windows, horizontally-sliding sashes and a fixed light.	II
Gate piers and screen walls 54.13454°N 0.87344°W	—	c. 1770	The gateway is at the entrance to Easthorpe Hall, now demolished, and the structures are in sandstone. There are four gate piers, each on a plinth and coped, and about 2.25 metres (7 ft 5 in) high. They have alternate long and short quoins forming rusticated bands, and pyramidal caps, the inner ones with ball finials. The linking quadrant screen walls have flat coping and are about 2 metres (6 ft 7 in) high.	II
West Grange Farmhouse and garage 54.15333°N 0.87684°W	—	Late 18th century	The farmhouse and garage are in sandstone, and have a pantile roof with coped gables and shaped kneelers. There are two storeys and six bays. Most of the windows are horizontally-sliding sashes with wedge lintels, and some lights are fixed. The entrance is at the rear, and the doorway on the front has been blocked, leaving its wedge lintel.	II
East Royd Farmhouse; 54.15236°N 0.87362°W	—	Early to mid 19th century	The farmhouse is in sandstone, with a moulded eaves course, and a slate roof with coped gables and shaped kneelers. There are two storeys and three bays. The central doorway has a vermiculated rusticated surround, a fanlight and a moulded cornice hood, and the windows are sashes with flat heads.	II
