= Easthorpe =

Easthorpe may refer to one of these places in England:

- Easthorpe, Essex
- Easthorpe, Leicestershire
- Easthorpe, Nottinghamshire
- Easthorpe, North Yorkshire
