= Dorcas (given name) =

Dorcas is a female given name. It derives from Dorcas (Ancient Greek: Δορκάς, romanized: Dorkás; Imperial Aramaic: טביתא, romanized: Ṭabītā; literally 'gazelle'), a figure from Acts of the Apostles (9:36–42) in the New Testament.

Persons named Dorcas include:

- Dorcas ye blackmore (c. 1620–after 1677), one of the first named African Americans to settle in New England
- Dorcas Ajoke Adesokan (born 1998), Nigerian badminton player
- Dorcas Blackwood, 1st Baroness Dufferin and Claneboye (1726–1807), Northern Irish personage
- Dorcas Brigham (1896-1986), American botanist and horticulturist
- Dorcas Cochran (c. 1903–1991), American lyricist and screenwriter
- Dorcas Coker-Appiah (born 1946), Ghanaian lawyer and women's rights activist
- Dorcas Denhartog (born 1965), American skier
- Dorcas Drake (1916–1993), American philanthropist
- Dorcas Good (ca. 1687/1688–?), child accused of witchcraft at the Salem witch trials
- Dorcas Gyimah (born 1992), Ghanaian sprinter
- Dorcas Fellows (1873–1938), American librarian
- Dorcas Hardy (1946–2019), American government official
- Dorcas Hoar (c. 1634–1711), widow accused of witchcraft at the Salem witch trials
- Dorcas Honorable (c. 1770–1855), Native American, last indigenous inhabitant of Nantucket
- Dorcas Kelly (died 1761), Irish brothel keeper and alleged serial killer
- Dorcas Makgato-Malesu, Botswanan cabinet minister
- Dorcas Martin (1537–1599), English bookseller active in religious controversies
- Dorcas Murunga (born 1969), Kenyan volleyball player
- Dorcas Muthoni (born 1979), Kenyan entrepreneur
- Dorcas Nakhomicha Ndasaba (born 1971), Kenyan volleyball player
- Dorcas Reilly (1926–2018), American chef; inventor of green bean casserole

== See also ==
- Dorka Gryllus (born 1972), Hungarian actress
- Tabitha, name derived from the Aramaic version
