= Doe (given name) =

English given name

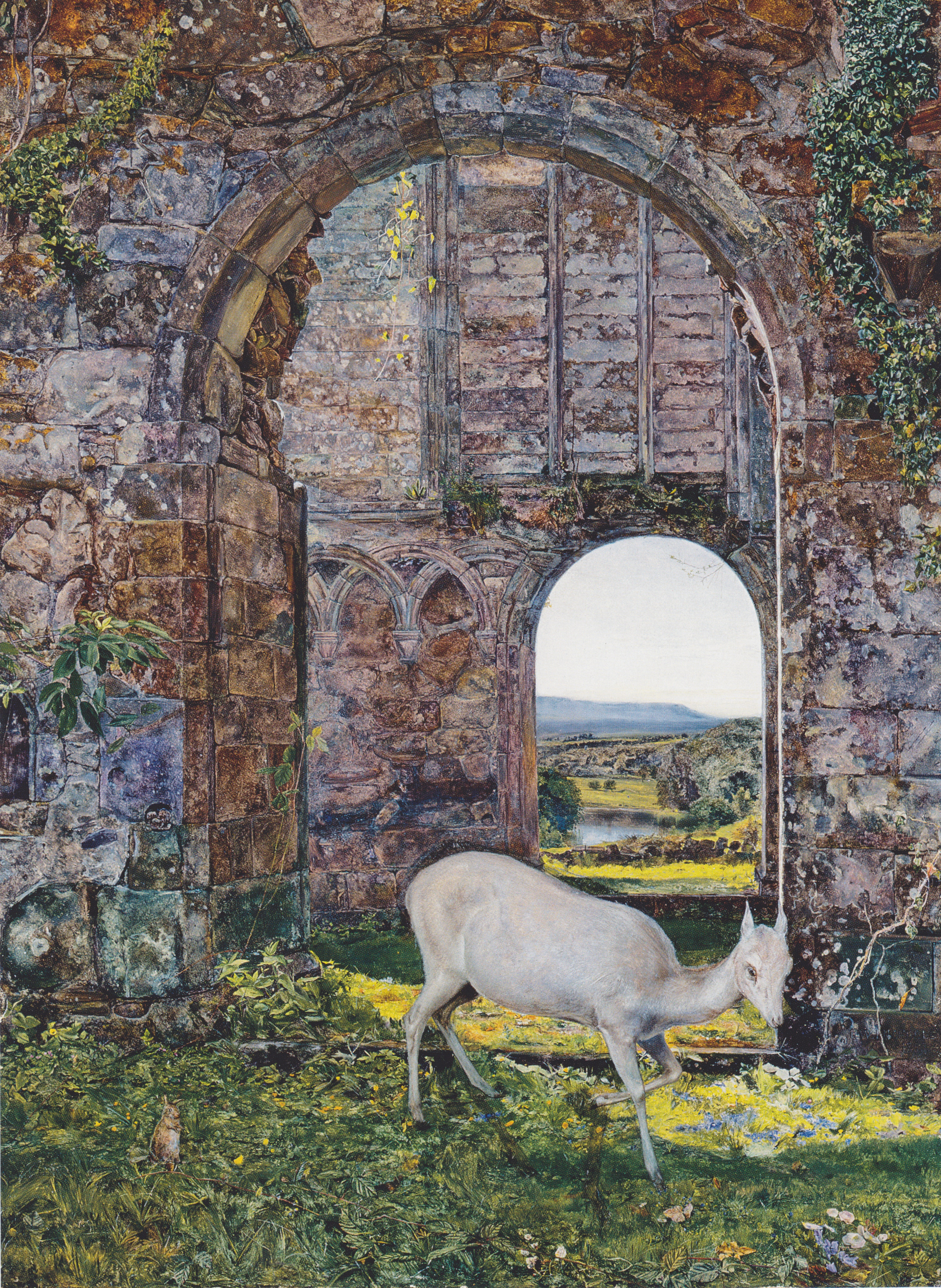
- The White Doe of Rylstone by John William Inchbold, 1855.
- Gender: Primarily feminine
- Language: English

Origin
- Meaning: Hypocorism for names beginning with Do; “Doe”

Doe is an English given name and a hypocorism for different names beginning with Do such as Dorcas, Dorian, Doris, Dorothy or Dolores.

In some instances, the name is derived from other sources. Doe is also a surname. It is also the English name for the female of several species of animal, including the deer and the rabbit, derived from the Old English dā, related to dēon ("to suck").

== Women ==
- Doe Avedon (born Dorcas Marie Nowell; 1925 – 2011), American model and actress
- Doris “Doe” Burn (born Doris Wernstedt; 1923 – 2011), American children’s book author
- Doe Paoro, stage name of American singer-songwriter Sonia Kreitzer (born 1984)
- Elizabeth McCourt “Baby Doe” Tabor (1854 – 1935), American second wife of Colorado pioneer businessman Horace Tabor whose rags-to-riches and back to rags again story inspired an opera and a Hollywood movie based on her life

== Men ==
- Dorian “Doe” Boyland (born 1955), American professional baseball player
