= All Saints Episcopal Church (Appleton, Wisconsin) =

Historic Episcopal church in Appleton, Wisconsin

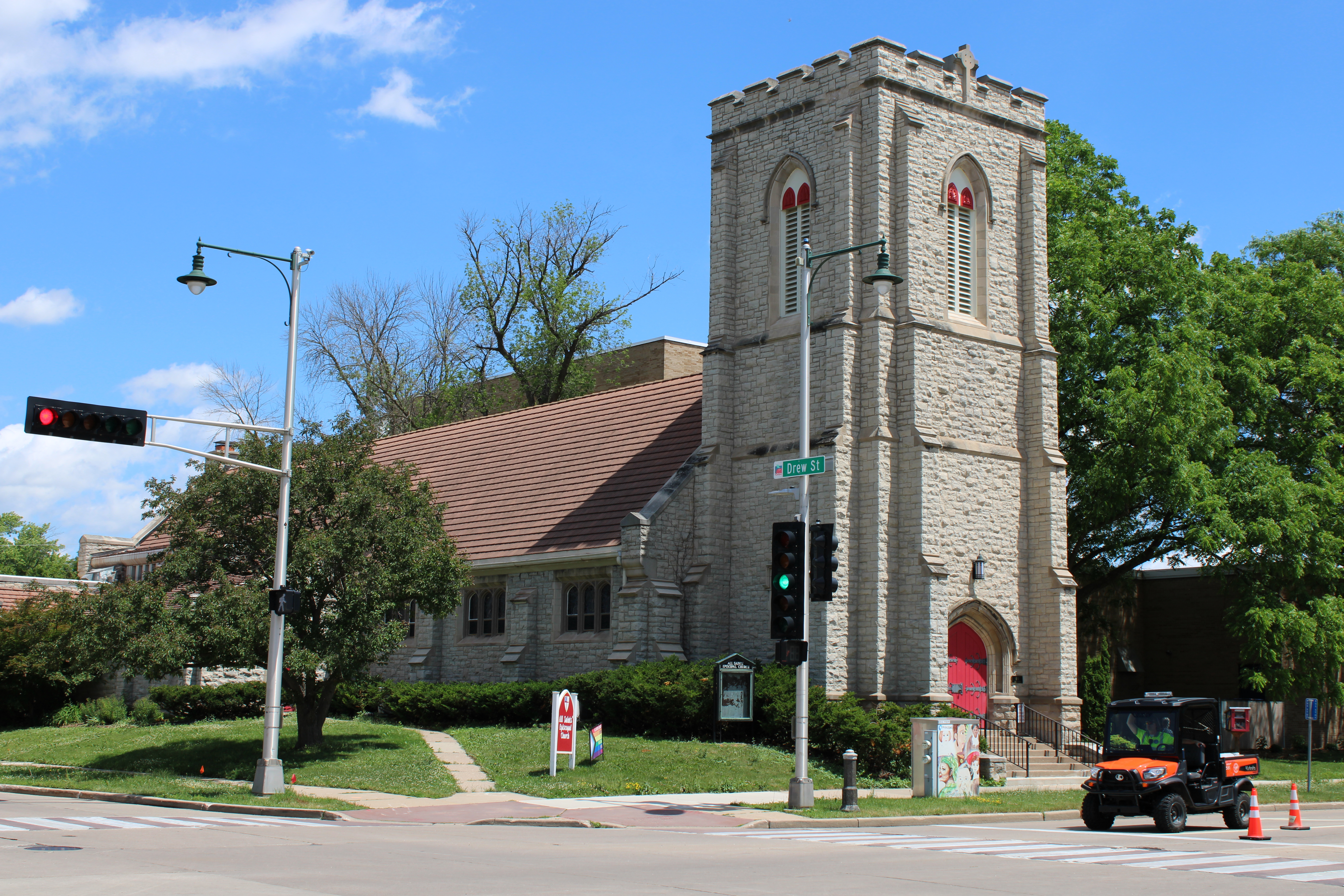

Religion
- Affiliation: Episcopal, Anglican
- District: Diocese of Wisconsin
- Province: Province V
- Ecclesiastical or organisational status: Parish church
- Leadership: The Revd. Cameron M. Walker
- Year consecrated: 1905 (current building)

Location
- Location: Appleton, Wisconsin, United States
- Interactive map of All Saints Episcopal Church
- Coordinates: 44.2620°N 88.4007°W

Architecture
- Architect: Shepley, Rutan & Coolidge
- Type: Church
- Style: Norman
- Completed: 1905 (current building)
- Construction cost: $25,000

Specifications
- Capacity: 225
- Materials: stone

Website
- All Saints Episcopal Church

All Saints Episcopal Church is a historic Episcopal church in Appleton, Wisconsin. A parish in the Diocese of Wisconsin, it is the only Episcopal church in Appleton. The congregation first met circa 1854 and organized in 1856. The current church building was consecrated in 1905.

In 2017, the church reported 664 members; in 2023, it reported 204 members. No membership statistics were reported in 2024 national parochial reports. Plate and pledge financial support reported by the church in 2024 was $277,479. Average Sunday Attendance ASA reported in 2024 was 47 persons. This was a relative decrease on ASA of 114 in 2017.

== History ==
Missionary bishop Jackson Kemper held the first Episcopal service in Appleton in "1854 or 1855". The parish was organized in 1856, and originally named Grace Episcopal Church. The first church building's cornerstone was laid by Bishop Kemper in 1864 and completed in 1866. The wooden structure cost $6,000 and was located at Appleton and Edwards (now Washington) streets. In 1883, the original building was moved to the current church site at College Avenue and Drew Street, adjacent to Lawrence University.

In 1905, that building was moved across the street while the current church building was constructed on the site. The 1905 building was designed by Shepley, Rutan & Coolidge. All Saints Norman stone tower is modeled on the tower of All Saints' Church, Appleton-le-Street, Yorkshire. In 1905, the name of the parish was changed to All Saints Episcopal Church. An estimated 1,500 to 2,000 people attended the cornerstone-laying service, presided over by Bishop Charles Chapman Grafton, on October 1, 1905. The first service in the completed building was celebrated on Easter Sunday, April 15, 1906. Bishop Reginald Heber Weller preached; the Rev. S. P. Delany was rector.

At 3:50 a.m., November 30, 1949, a taxi driver reported that a fire had broken out at All Saints. The fire started in the basement and burned through the floor, causing the altar to fall into the basement and charring the rest of the interior of the church. The altar, which was fairly new, the reredos, the organ, the carved choir stalls, a Tiffany window, and the bishop's chair were destroyed, but the baptistry was spared. Vestments and other fabrics were smoke-damaged. The total loss was estimated at $75,000. The interior of the church dates from 1950, rebuilt after the fire by architectural firm Maurey Lee Allen. Bishop Harwood Sturtevant officially rededicated All Saints with special services featuring a new organ on All Saints Sunday 1952. The organ, built by M. P. Moller, was installed in 1951.

The 1910 Reid Memorial Window, a Tiffany window depicting Dorcas, Acts of the Apostles (9:36–42,) was destroyed in the 1949 fire.

In 1959, building plans by J. Rouman & Associates for the parish center were approved, and the rectory and neighboring house on the corner were torn down. Construction began in 1960 and was completed in January 1961. Parish "work parties" painted and did other finishing work. The dedication of the parish center was on April 30, 1961.

Gerald F. Gilmore, formerly assistant minister at St. John's Episcopal Church, Lafayette Square, became rector in 1949. The Rev. Patrick Twomey had been rector for 19 years when he retired in 2015.

A five-volume scrapbook, History of All Saints Episcopal Church (Grace Church), was compiled by Ann P. Kloehn and Joyce Barlow Helien is in the possession of the church.

== People and Community ==
Nathan Pusey, who was a member while serving as President of Lawrence College from 1944 to 1953, was an active partisan in the movement that pushed All Saints into the "low church" column at a time when Wisconsin was predominately "high church".(See folder 4, Correspondence, Nathan Pusey Presidential Papers, 1925-2005 | Lawrence University Archives)

All Saints is a worship community with activities in adult education, music ministry, pastoral care and bible studies. Parish-organized outreach efforts see parishioners devote time and assistance to local charitable organizations including Emergency Shelter of the Fox Valley, Harbor House Domestic Abuse Shelter and Leaven. All Saints also holds several large in-gatherings each year to support these organizations. The Outreach Committee, based on determination of need, directs the in-gatherings.

With its central, downtown location, the building is used by community groups including Attic Theatre, events for Lawrence University and meetings of the Diocese of Wisconsin.

== Rectors & Priests-in-Charge ==
1. The Rev. Simeon Palmer - 1862-1864
2. The Rev. L. P. Tchiffely - 1864-1865
3. The Rev. George Gibson - 1865-1868
4. The Rev. Jerome A. Davenport - 1868-1869
5. The Rev. Edwin Peake - 1869-1871
6. The Rev. J. L. Steele - 1871-1872
7. The Rev. George Vernor - 1872-1886
8. The Rev. James B. Williams - 1886-1889
9. The Rev. George Howard S. Somerville - 1889-1892
10. The Rev. Lloyd E. Johnston - 1892-1893
11. The Rev. A. K. Glover - 1893-1895
12. The Rev. W. Dafter, D.D. - 1895-1902
13. The Rev. Selden Peabody Delaney - 1902-1907
14. The Rev. J. Boyd Coxe - 1907
15. The Rev. Orrok Colloque - 1908-1910
16. The Rev. Irving Spencer - 1910-1912
17. The Rev. Doane Upjohn - 1912-1921
18. The Rev. Paul O. Keicher - 1921-1924
19. The Rev. Clark A. Wilson - 1924-1925
20. The Rev. Henry S. Gatley - 1926-1930
21. The Rev. Lyle Douglas Utts - 1930-1933
22. The Rev. William James Spicer, D.D. - 1933-1945
23. The Rev. Robert Reister - 1946-1948
24. The Rev. Gerald Gilmore - 1949-1951
25. The Rev. Arthur B. Ward - 1951-1957
26. The Rev. Canon Carl E. Wilke - 1957-1970
27. The Rev. Ralph R. Stewart - 1970-1980
28. The Rev. Canon Arthur K. D. Kephart - 1981-1995
29. The Rev. Patrick T. Twomey - 1995-2015
30. The Rev. James Harrison - 2016-2018
31. The Rev. Christopher T. Wilkerson - 2019-2025
32. The Rev. Cameron M. Walker [Priest-in-Charge] - 2026–Present
