= Paratorna =

Scientific classification
- Kingdom: Animalia
- Phylum: Arthropoda
- Class: Insecta
- Order: Lepidoptera
- Family: Tortricidae
- Tribe: Tortricini
- Genus: Paratorna; Meyrick, 1907

Synonyms
- Patatorna Byun & Park, 1992

Genus of tortrix moths

Paratorna is a genus of moths belonging to the subfamily Tortricinae of the family Tortricidae. The genus was erected by Edward Meyrick in 1907.

== Species ==
- Paratorna catenulella (Christoph, 1882)
- Paratorna cuprescens Falkovitsh, 1965
- Paratorna dorcas Meyrick, 1907
- Paratorna fenestralis Razowski, 1964
- Paratorna pterofulva Liu & Bai, 1988
- Paratorna pteropolia Liu & Bai, 1988
- Paratorna schintlmeisteri Razowski, 1991
- Paratorna seriepuncta (Christoph, 1882)

== Former species ==
- Paratorna oenina Diakonoff, 1976

== See also ==
- List of Tortricidae genera
