= Eodorcadion novitzkyi =

Scientific classification
- Domain: Eukaryota
- Kingdom: Animalia
- Phylum: Arthropoda
- Class: Insecta
- Order: Coleoptera
- Suborder: Polyphaga
- Infraorder: Cucujiformia
- Family: Cerambycidae
- Genus: Eodorcadion
- Species: E. novitzkyi

Binomial name
- Eodorcadion novitzkyi (Suvorov, 1909)

Species of beetle

Eodorcadion novitzkyi is a species of beetle in the family Cerambycidae. It was described by Suvorov in 1909. It is known from Mongolia.
