= Eodorcadion lutshniki =

Scientific classification
- Domain: Eukaryota
- Kingdom: Animalia
- Phylum: Arthropoda
- Class: Insecta
- Order: Coleoptera
- Suborder: Polyphaga
- Infraorder: Cucujiformia
- Family: Cerambycidae
- Genus: Eodorcadion
- Species: E. lutshniki

Binomial name
- Eodorcadion lutshniki (Plavilstshikov, 1937)

Species of beetle

Eodorcadion lutshniki is a species of beetle in the family Cerambycidae. It was described by Plavilstshikov in 1937. It is known from Mongolia.

== Subspecies ==
- Eodorcadion lutshniki altanelsense Heyrovský, 1973
- Eodorcadion lutshniki bicoloratum Danilevsky, 2007
- Eodorcadion lutshniki burenum Danilevsky, 2007
- Eodorcadion lutshniki lutshniki (Plavilstshikov, 1937)
