= Eodorcadion zichyi =

Scientific classification
- Domain: Eukaryota
- Kingdom: Animalia
- Phylum: Arthropoda
- Class: Insecta
- Order: Coleoptera
- Suborder: Polyphaga
- Infraorder: Cucujiformia
- Family: Cerambycidae
- Genus: Eodorcadion
- Species: E. zichyi

Binomial name
- Eodorcadion zichyi (Csiki, 1901)

Synonyms
- Eodorcadion heros Namhaidorzh, 1972

Species of beetle

Eodorcadion zichyi is a species of beetle in the family Cerambycidae. It was described by Csiki in 1901. It is known from Mongolia.
