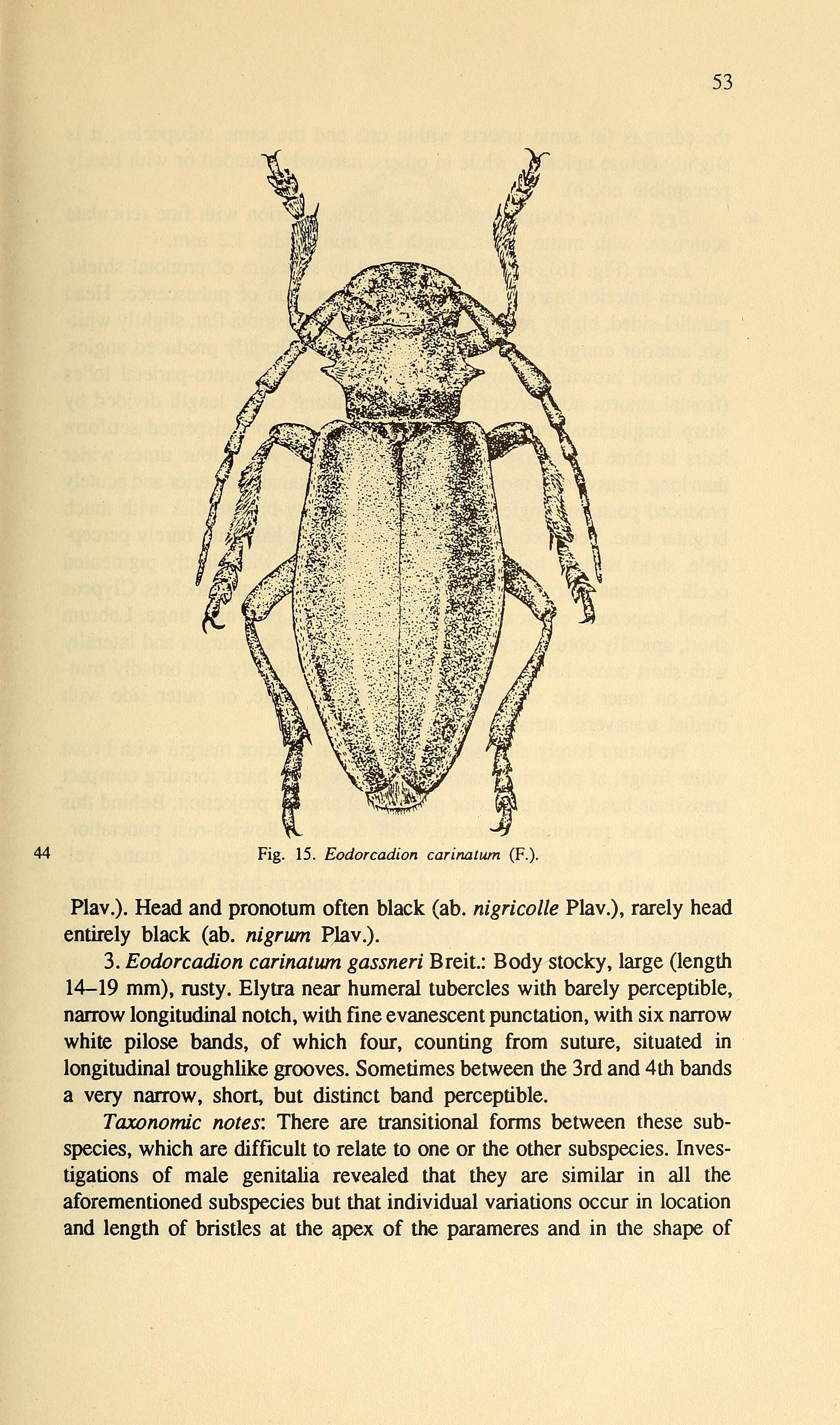

Scientific classification
- Kingdom: Animalia
- Phylum: Arthropoda
- Class: Insecta
- Order: Coleoptera
- Suborder: Polyphaga
- Infraorder: Cucujiformia
- Family: Cerambycidae
- Genus: Eodorcadion
- Species: E. carinatum

Binomial name
- Eodorcadion carinatum (Fabricius, 1781)

Synonyms
- Lamia carinata Fabricius, 1781

= Eodorcadion carinatum =

Species of beetle

Eodorcadion carinatum is a species of beetle in the family Cerambycidae. It was described by Johan Christian Fabricius in 1781. It is known from Mongolia.

== Subspecies ==
- Eodorcadion carinatum blessigi (Ganglbauer, 1884)
- Eodorcadion carinatum bramsoni (Pic, 1901)
- Eodorcadion carinatum carinatum (Fabricius, 1781)
- Eodorcadion carinatum involvens (Fischer von Waldheim, 1823)
- Eodorcadion carinatum kiahtenum Danilevsky, 2007
