= Eodorcadion humerale =

Scientific classification
- Kingdom: Animalia
- Phylum: Arthropoda
- Class: Insecta
- Order: Coleoptera
- Suborder: Polyphaga
- Infraorder: Cucujiformia
- Family: Cerambycidae
- Genus: Eodorcadion
- Species: E. humerale

Binomial name
- Eodorcadion humerale (Gebler, 1823)

Species of beetle

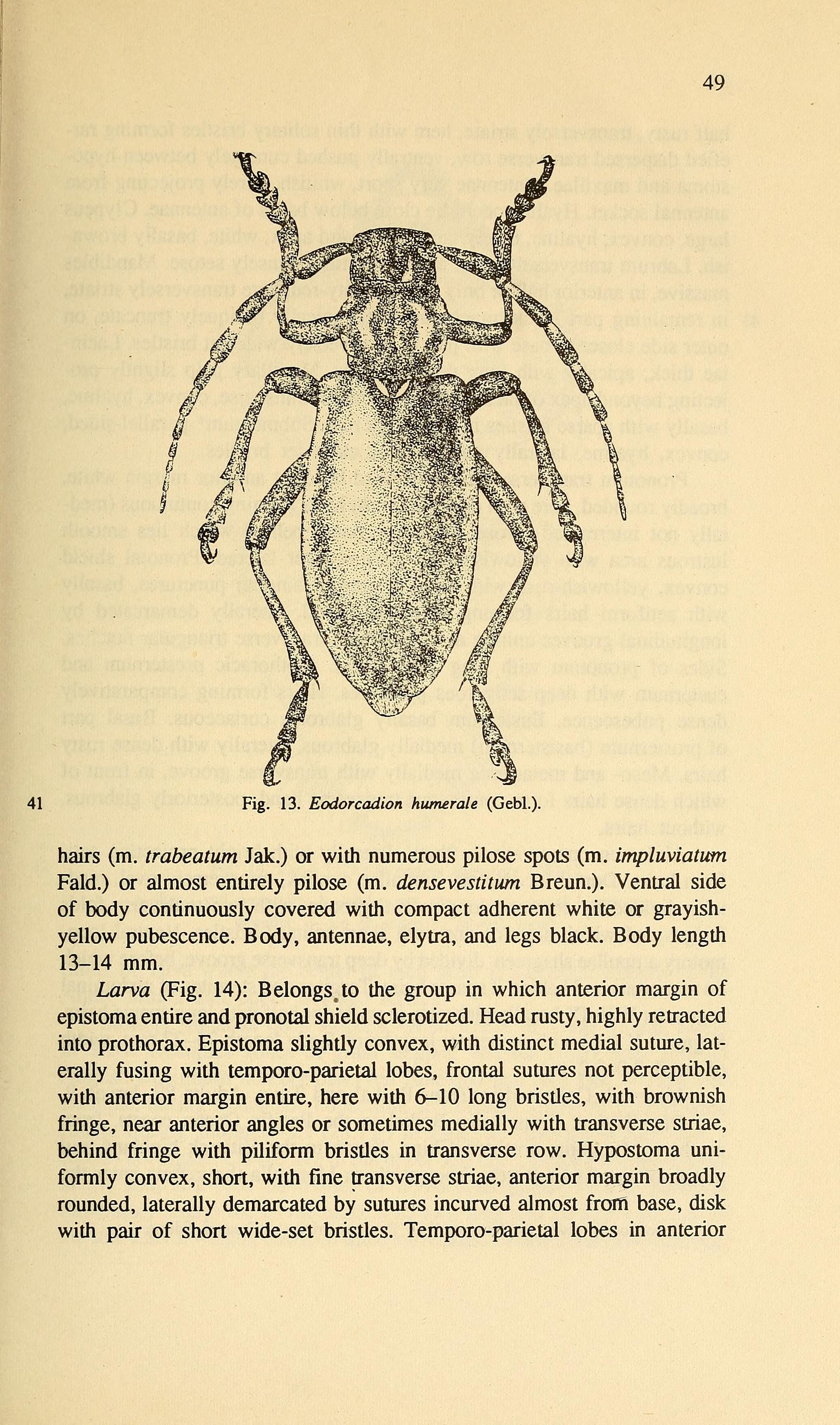
Cerambycidae of Northern Asia

Eodorcadion humerale is a species of beetle in the family Cerambycidae. It was described by Gebler in 1823. It is known from Mongolia.

== Subspecies ==
- Eodorcadion humerale humerale (Gebler, 1823)
- Eodorcadion humerale impluviatum (Faldermann, 1833)
- Eodorcadion humerale trabeatum (Jakovlev, 1901)
