= Eodorcadion mandschukuoense =

Scientific classification
- Kingdom: Animalia
- Phylum: Arthropoda
- Class: Insecta
- Order: Coleoptera
- Suborder: Polyphaga
- Infraorder: Cucujiformia
- Family: Cerambycidae
- Genus: Eodorcadion
- Species: E. mandschukuoense

Binomial name
- Eodorcadion mandschukuoense (Breuning, 1944)

Synonyms
- Eodorcadion jilinense Chiang, 1983

Species of beetle

Eodorcadion mandschukuoense is a species of beetle in the family Cerambycidae. It was described by Stephan von Breuning in 1944.
