= Eodorcadion sifanicum =

Scientific classification
- Domain: Eukaryota
- Kingdom: Animalia
- Phylum: Arthropoda
- Class: Insecta
- Order: Coleoptera
- Suborder: Polyphaga
- Infraorder: Cucujiformia
- Family: Cerambycidae
- Genus: Eodorcadion
- Species: E. sifanicum

Binomial name
- Eodorcadion sifanicum (Suvorov, 1912)

Species of beetle

Eodorcadion sifanicum is a species of beetle in the family Cerambycidae. It was described by Suvorov in 1912.
