= Paratorna cuprescens =

Scientific classification
- Domain: Eukaryota
- Kingdom: Animalia
- Phylum: Arthropoda
- Class: Insecta
- Order: Lepidoptera
- Family: Tortricidae
- Genus: Paratorna
- Species: P. cuprescens

Binomial name
- Paratorna cuprescens Falkovitsh, 1965

Species of moth

Paratorna cuprescens is a species of moth of the family Tortricidae. It is found in the Russian Far East, Korea and Japan.

The wingspan is 15–17 mm.
