= Cnesteboda assamica =

Scientific classification
- Kingdom: Animalia
- Phylum: Arthropoda
- Class: Insecta
- Order: Lepidoptera
- Family: Tortricidae
- Genus: Cnesteboda
- Species: C. assamica

Binomial name
- Cnesteboda assamica (Razowski, 1964)

Synonyms
- Eboda assamica Razowski, 1964

Species of moth

Cnesteboda assamica is a species of moth of the family Tortricidae. It is found in India (Assam) and the Philippines.
