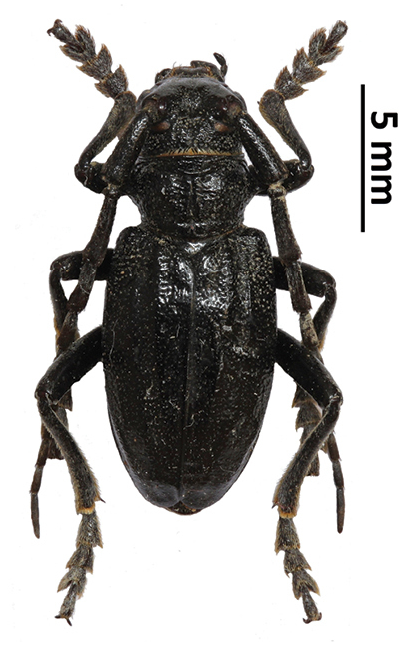

Scientific classification
- Kingdom: Animalia
- Phylum: Arthropoda
- Clade: Pancrustacea
- Class: Insecta
- Order: Coleoptera
- Suborder: Polyphaga
- Infraorder: Cucujiformia
- Family: Cerambycidae
- Genus: Eodorcadion
- Species: E. maurum

Binomial name
- Eodorcadion maurum (Jakovlev, 1890)

Synonyms
- Eodorcadion annulatum Heyrovský, 1969; Eodorcadion boldi Heyrovský, 1965; Eodorcadion fortecostatum Heyrovský, 1975; Eodorcadion grumi Suvorov, 1909; Eodorcadion hirtipes Jakovlev, 1901

= Eodorcadion maurum =

Species of beetle

Eodorcadion maurum is a species of beetle in the family Cerambycidae. It was described by B.E. Jakovlev in 1890. It is found in Mongolia.

== Subspecies ==
- Eodorcadion maurum katharinae (Reitter, 1898).
- Eodorcadion maurum maurum (Jakovlev, 1890).
- Eodorcadion maurum quinquevittatum (Hammerström, 1893).
- Eodorcadion maurum sajanicum (Hammerström, 1893).
