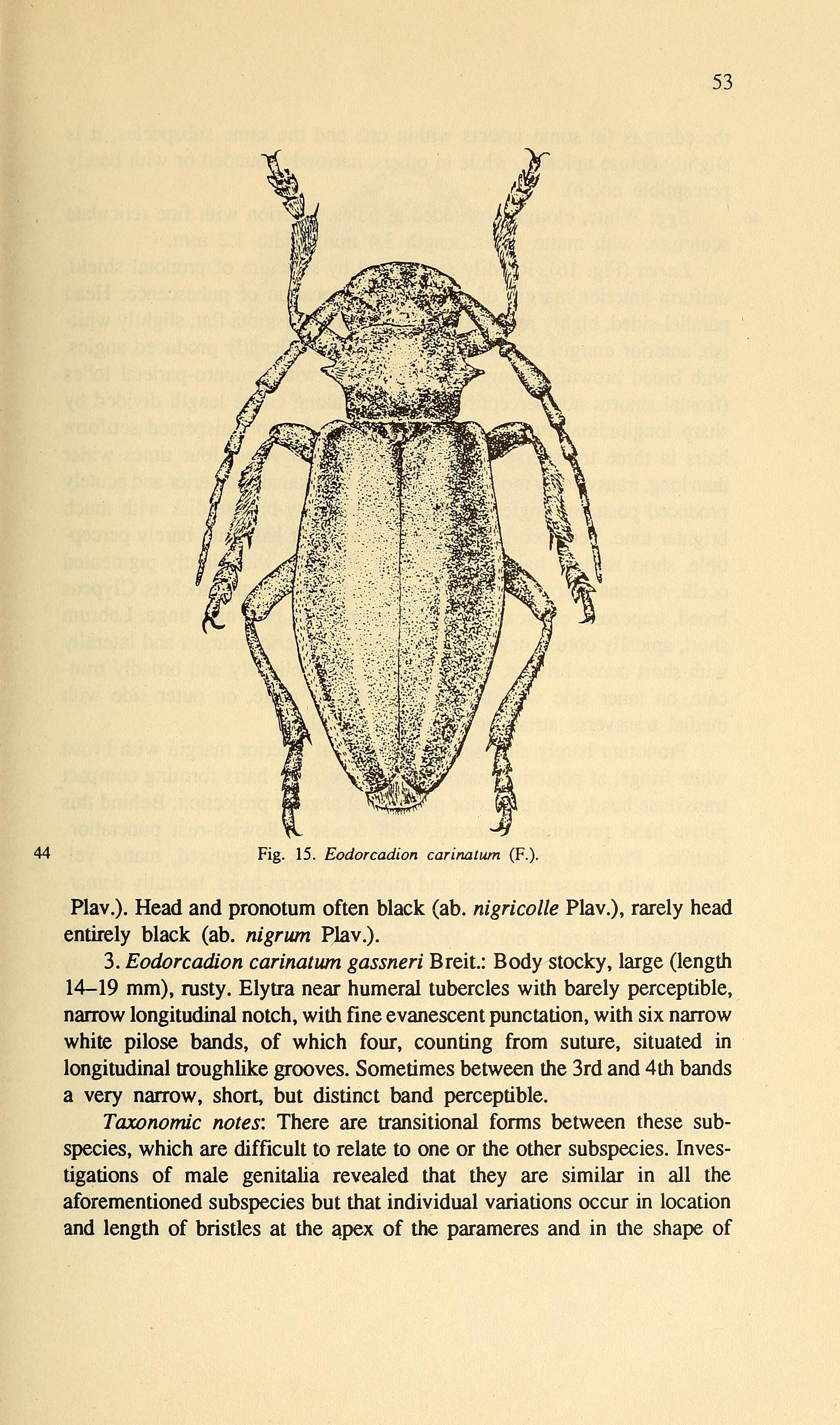
- Eodorcadion carinatum

Scientific classification
- Kingdom: Animalia
- Phylum: Arthropoda
- Class: Insecta
- Order: Coleoptera
- Suborder: Polyphaga
- Infraorder: Cucujiformia
- Family: Cerambycidae
- Subfamily: Lamiinae
- Tribe: Dorcadiini
- Genus: Eodorcadion; Breuning, 1947

= Eodorcadion =

Genus of beetles

Eodorcadion is a genus of longhorn beetles of the subfamily Lamiinae, containing the following species:

Subgenus Eodorcadion

- Eodorcadion altaicum (Suvorov, 1909)
- Eodorcadion carinatum (Fabricius, 1781)
- Eodorcadion chinganicum (Suvorov, 1909)
- Eodorcadion darigangense Heyrovský, 1967
- Eodorcadion gansuense (Breuning, 1943)
- Eodorcadion glaucopterum (Ganglbauer, 1883)
- Eodorcadion kadleci Danilevsky, 2007
- Eodorcadion mandschukuoense (Breuning, 1944)
- Eodorcadion maurum (Jakovlev, 1890)
- Eodorcadion multicarinatum (Breuning, 1943)
- Eodorcadion oligocarinatum Danilevsky, 2007
- Eodorcadion ptyalopleurum (Suvorov, 1909)
- Eodorcadion shanxiense Danilevsky, 2007
- Eodorcadion sifanicum (Suvorov, 1912)
- Eodorcadion sinicum Breuning, 1948
- Eodorcadion tuvense Plavilstshikov, 1958
- Eodorcadion virgatum (Motschulsky, 1854)

Subgenus Humerodorcadion

- Eodorcadion humerale (Gebler, 1823)
- Eodorcadion lutshniki (Plavilstshikov, 1937)

Subgenus Ornatodorcadion

- Eodorcadion argaloides Breuning, 1947
- Eodorcadion brandti (Gebler, 1841)
- Eodorcadion consentaneum (Jakovlev, 1899)
- Eodorcadion dorcas (Jakovlev, 1901)
- Eodorcadion egregium (Reitter, 1897)
- Eodorcadion exaratum (Ménetriés, 1854)
- Eodorcadion gorbunovi Danilevsky, 2004
- Eodorcadion heros (Jakovlev, 1899)
- Eodorcadion intermedium (Jakovlev, 1890)
- Eodorcadion jakovlevi (Suvorov, 1912)
- Eodorcadion kaznakovi (Suvorov, 1912)
- Eodorcadion licenti (Pic, 1939)
- Eodorcadion novitzkyi (Suvorov, 1909)
- Eodorcadion oreadis (Reitter, 1897)
- Eodorcadion ornatum (Faldermann, 1833)
- Eodorcadion oryx (Jakovlev, 1895)
- Eodorcadion potanini (Jakovlev, 1889)
- Eodorcadion zichyi (Csiki, 1901)
