= Eodorcadion brandti =

Scientific classification
- Domain: Eukaryota
- Kingdom: Animalia
- Phylum: Arthropoda
- Class: Insecta
- Order: Coleoptera
- Suborder: Polyphaga
- Infraorder: Cucujiformia
- Family: Cerambycidae
- Genus: Eodorcadion
- Species: E. brandti

Binomial name
- Eodorcadion brandti (Gebler, 1841)

Species of beetle

Eodorcadion brandti is a species of beetle in the family Cerambycidae. It was described by Gebler in 1841.
