= Cnesteboda spinosa =

Scientific classification
- Domain: Eukaryota
- Kingdom: Animalia
- Phylum: Arthropoda
- Class: Insecta
- Order: Lepidoptera
- Family: Tortricidae
- Genus: Cnesteboda
- Species: C. spinosa

Binomial name
- Cnesteboda spinosa (Diakonoff, 1948)

Synonyms
- Eboda spinosa Diakonoff, 1948

Species of moth

Cnesteboda spinosa is a species of moth of the family Tortricidae. It is found in Indonesia (Java).
