= Cnesteboda haruspex =

Scientific classification
- Domain: Eukaryota
- Kingdom: Animalia
- Phylum: Arthropoda
- Class: Insecta
- Order: Lepidoptera
- Family: Tortricidae
- Genus: Cnesteboda
- Species: C. haruspex

Binomial name
- Cnesteboda haruspex (Meyrick, 1912)

Synonyms
- Eboda haruspex Meyrick, 1912

Species of moth

Cnesteboda haruspex is a species of moth of the family Tortricidae. It is found in Sri Lanka.

The wingspan is 14–15 mm. Adults have been recorded on wing in April and October.
