= Paratorna fenestralis =

Scientific classification
- Domain: Eukaryota
- Kingdom: Animalia
- Phylum: Arthropoda
- Class: Insecta
- Order: Lepidoptera
- Family: Tortricidae
- Genus: Paratorna
- Species: P. fenestralis

Binomial name
- Paratorna fenestralis Razowski, 1964

Species of moth

Paratorna fenestralis is a species of moth of the family Tortricidae. It is found in India (Assam).
