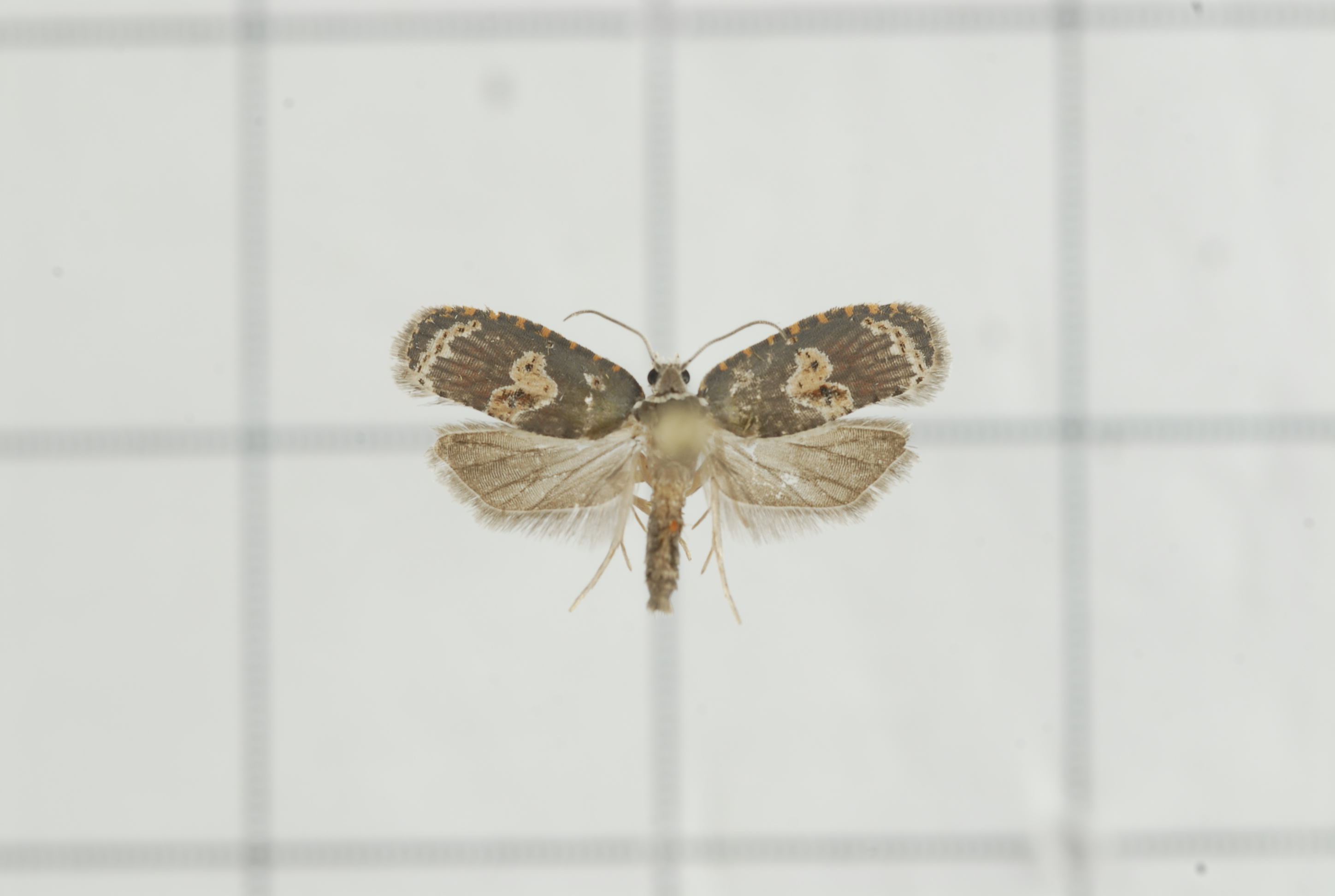
- Cnesteboda celligera

Scientific classification
- Domain: Eukaryota
- Kingdom: Animalia
- Phylum: Arthropoda
- Class: Insecta
- Order: Lepidoptera
- Family: Tortricidae
- Tribe: Tortricini
- Genus: Cnesteboda; Razowski, 1990

= Cnesteboda =

Genus of tortrix moths

Cnesteboda is a genus of moths belonging to the family Tortricidae.

== Species ==
- Cnesteboda anisocornutana (Razowski, 1964)
- Cnesteboda assamica (Razowski, 1964)
- Cnesteboda celligera (Meyrick, 1918)
- Cnesteboda davidsoni Razowski, 2000
- Cnesteboda facilis (Meyrick, 1912)
- Cnesteboda haruspex (Meyrick, 1912)
- Cnesteboda musculus (Diakonoff, 1948)
- Cnesteboda oenina (Diakonoff, 1976)
- Cnesteboda spinosa (Diakonoff, 1948)
- Cnesteboda variabilis (Diakonoff, 1941)

== See also ==
- List of Tortricidae genera
