= Eodorcadion altaicum =

Scientific classification
- Domain: Eukaryota
- Kingdom: Animalia
- Phylum: Arthropoda
- Class: Insecta
- Order: Coleoptera
- Suborder: Polyphaga
- Infraorder: Cucujiformia
- Family: Cerambycidae
- Genus: Eodorcadion
- Species: E. altaicum

Binomial name
- Eodorcadion altaicum (Suvorov, 1909)

Synonyms
- Eodorcadion carinatum altaicum Suvorov, 1909

Species of beetle

Eodorcadion altaicum is a species of beetle in the family Cerambycidae. It was described by Suvorov in 1909.
