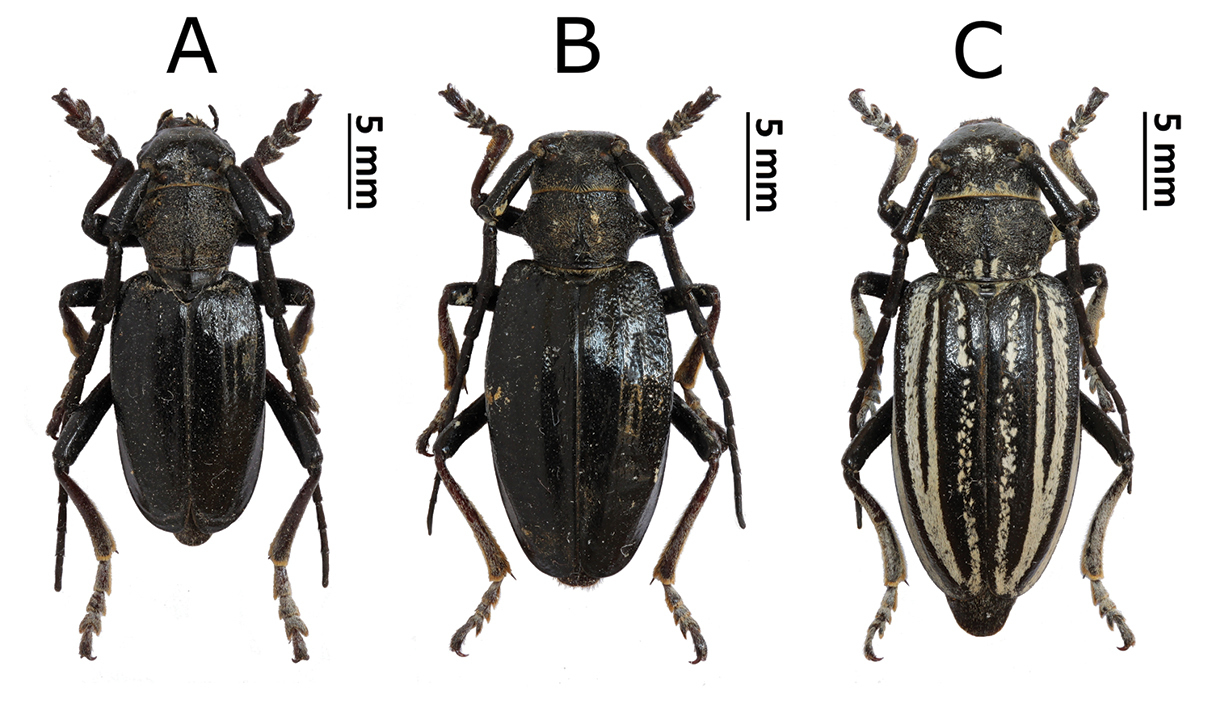
- A: male B: female, black form C: female, striped form

Scientific classification
- Kingdom: Animalia
- Phylum: Arthropoda
- Class: Insecta
- Order: Coleoptera
- Suborder: Polyphaga
- Infraorder: Cucujiformia
- Family: Cerambycidae
- Genus: Eodorcadion
- Species: E. consentaneum

Binomial name
- Eodorcadion consentaneum (Jakovlev, 1899)

= Eodorcadion consentaneum =

Species of beetle

Eodorcadion consentaneum is a species of beetle in the family Cerambycidae. It was described by Jakovlev in 1899. It is known from Mongolia.
