= Eodorcadion exaratum =

Scientific classification
- Domain: Eukaryota
- Kingdom: Animalia
- Phylum: Arthropoda
- Class: Insecta
- Order: Coleoptera
- Suborder: Polyphaga
- Infraorder: Cucujiformia
- Family: Cerambycidae
- Genus: Eodorcadion
- Species: E. exaratum

Binomial name
- Eodorcadion exaratum (Ménétries, 1854)

Species of beetle

Eodorcadion exaratum is a species of beetle in the family Cerambycidae. It was described by Édouard Ménétries in 1854. It is known from Mongolia.

== Subspecies ==
- Eodorcadion exaratum argali (Jakovlev, 1890)
- Eodorcadion exaratum exaratum (Ménétries, 1854)
