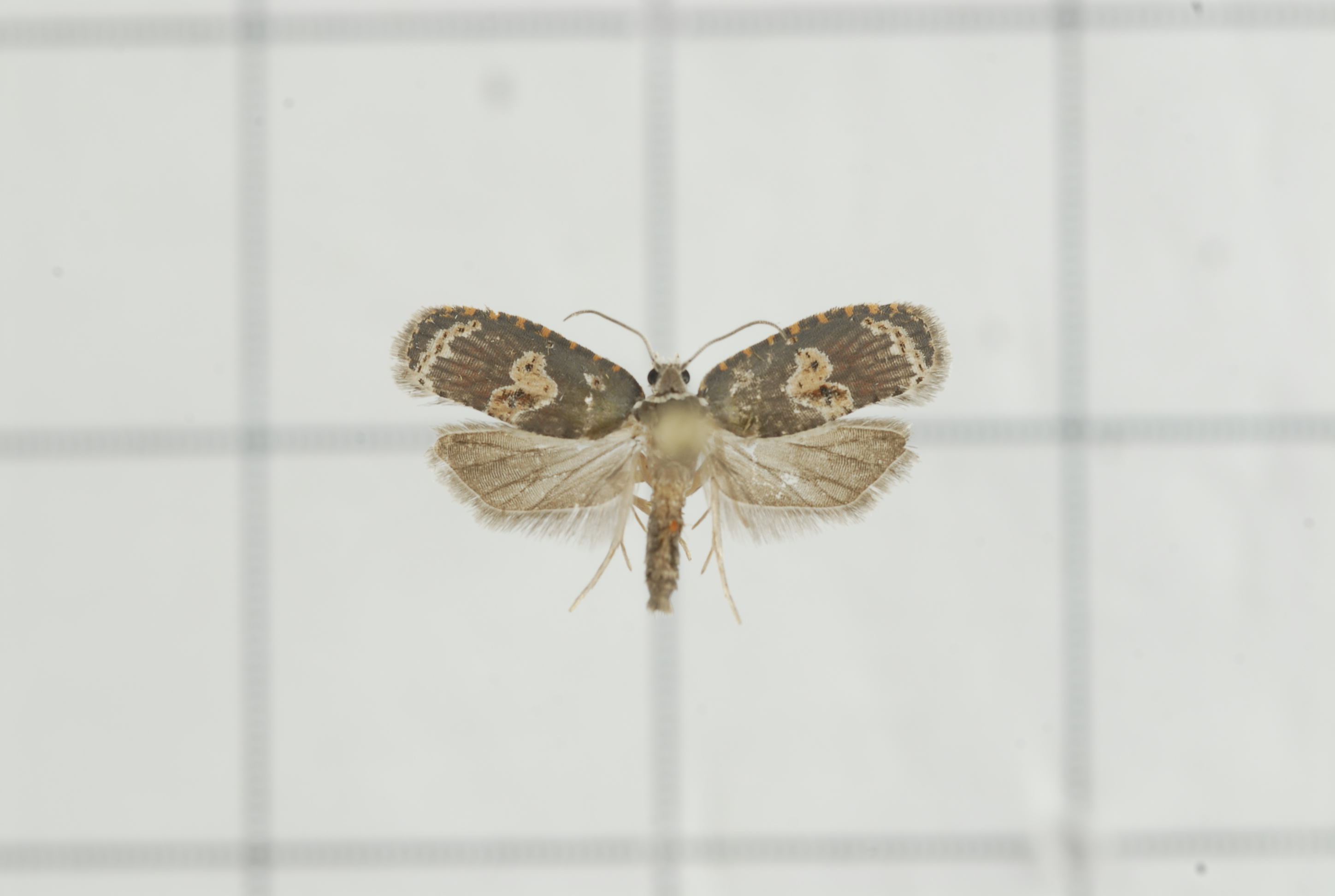

Scientific classification
- Domain: Eukaryota
- Kingdom: Animalia
- Phylum: Arthropoda
- Class: Insecta
- Order: Lepidoptera
- Family: Tortricidae
- Genus: Cnesteboda
- Species: C. celligera

Binomial name
- Cnesteboda celligera (Meyrick, 1918)

Synonyms
- Eboda celligera Meyrick, 1918; Paratorna glaucoprosopis Meyrick, 1931

= Cnesteboda celligera =

Species of moth

Cnesteboda celligera is a species of moth of the family Tortricidae first described by Edward Meyrick in 1918. It is found in India, Sri Lanka, Vietnam, Taiwan, Malaysia and Indonesia (Java, Bali).

The wingspan is about 11.6 mm.

The larvae have been recorded feeding on Litchi chinensis, Nephelium lappaceum and Schleichera oleosa.
