= Paratorna pterofulva =

Scientific classification
- Domain: Eukaryota
- Kingdom: Animalia
- Phylum: Arthropoda
- Class: Insecta
- Order: Lepidoptera
- Family: Tortricidae
- Genus: Paratorna
- Species: P. pterofulva

Binomial name
- Paratorna pterofulva Liu & Bai, 1988

Species of moth

Paratorna pterofulva is a species of moth of the family Tortricidae. It is found in China (Sichuan).
