= Thomas Taylor (cricketer, born 1823) =

English cricketer and British Army officer

Personal information
- Full name: Thomas Clough Taylor
- Born: 27 August 1823; Appleton-le-Street, Yorkshire, England
- Died: 10 July 1859 (aged 35); Meerut, North-Western Provinces, British India
- Batting: Unknown

Domestic team information
- Years: Team
- 1850–1851: Marylebone Cricket Club
- 1850: Middlesex

Career statistics
Competition	First-class
Matches	6
Runs scored	70
Batting average	7.77
100s/50s	–/–
Top score	21
Catches/stumpings	1/–
- Source: Cricinfo, 16 August 2019

Thomas Clough Taylor DL (27 August 1823 – 10 July 1859) was an English first-class cricketer and British Army officer.

== Biography ==
The son of Edward Clough Taylor and Emma Georgina Taylor (née Badcock), he was born on 27 August 1823 at Appleton-le-Street, Yorkshire. Educated at Harrow School between 1838 and 1842 where he appeared for the school first cricket XI in 1840–41. From Harrow he enlisted in the British Army by purchasing the rank of ensign in the 41st Regiment of Foot in September 1842, with Taylor purchasing the rank of lieutenant in 1844. He made his debut in first-class cricket in 1850 for the Marylebone Cricket Club (MCC) against Cambridge University at Fenner's. He made four further first-class appearances in 1850, with two further appearances for the MCC, in addition to playing for Middlesex against Surrey at The Oval, and for the Gentlemen of England against the Gentlemen of Kent at Canterbury. His final first-class appearance came in 1851 for the MCC against Cambridge University. His six first-class matches yielded him 70 runs with a high score of 20.

In February 1850, Taylor purchased a captaincy in the 41st Foot but sold he commission in May 1850 and retired from the army. By 1852 Taylor was in the Cape Colony and saw action in the Eighth Xhosa War as a captain in command of a company of native troops for which he was mentioned in dispatches. Returning to Britain by 1853, he was appointed as adjutant to the 5th West Yorkshire Militia. He was appointed as a deputy lieutenant for the West Riding of Yorkshire in 1855. In December 1855 Taylor was charged with the embezzlement of £300 belonging to the British army and appeared before York magistrates. However explanations were provided to the War Office and the charge was dropped. In April 1856 he resigned from the post of adjutant in the militia. He died at Meerut in British India on 10 July 1859 while serving as a sergeant in the 6th Dragoon Guards.
