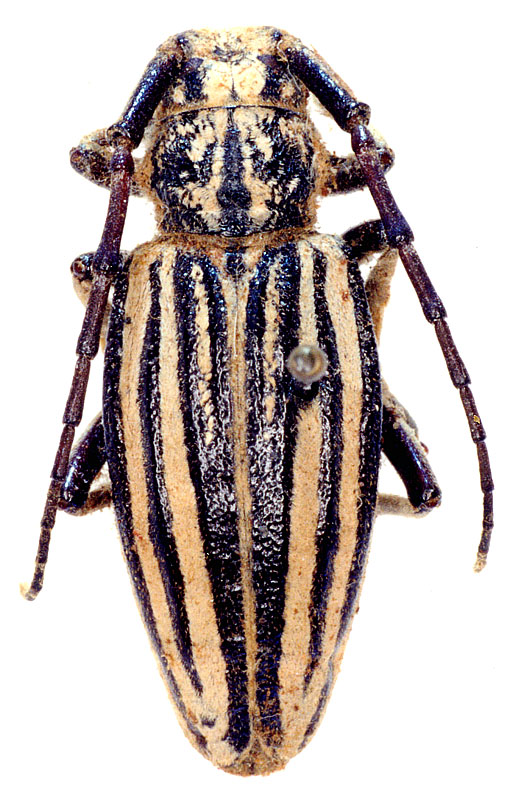

Scientific classification
- Domain: Eukaryota
- Kingdom: Animalia
- Phylum: Arthropoda
- Class: Insecta
- Order: Coleoptera
- Suborder: Polyphaga
- Infraorder: Cucujiformia
- Family: Cerambycidae
- Genus: Eodorcadion
- Species: E. ornatum

Binomial name
- Eodorcadion ornatum (Faldermann, 1833)

Synonyms
- Eodorcadion princeps Jakovlev, 1899; ?Eodorcadion exoratum Ménétriés, 1854

= Eodorcadion ornatum =

Species of beetle

Eodorcadion ornatum is a species of beetle in the family Cerambycidae. It was described by Faldermann in 1833.
