= Eodorcadion intermedium =

Scientific classification
- Domain: Eukaryota
- Kingdom: Animalia
- Phylum: Arthropoda
- Class: Insecta
- Order: Coleoptera
- Suborder: Polyphaga
- Infraorder: Cucujiformia
- Family: Cerambycidae
- Genus: Eodorcadion
- Species: E. intermedium

Binomial name
- Eodorcadion intermedium (Jakovlev, 1890)

Synonyms
- Neodorcadion kaszabi Heyrovsky, 1965; Neodorcadion mongolicum Jakolev, 1895

Species of beetle

Eodorcadion intermedium is a species of beetle in the family Cerambycidae. It was described by Jakovlev in 1890. It is known from Mongolia.

== Subspecies ==
- Eodorcadion intermedium intermedium (Jakovlev, 1890)
- Eodorcadion intermedium kozlovi (Suvorov, 1912)
