= Eodorcadion virgatum =

Scientific classification
- Domain: Eukaryota
- Kingdom: Animalia
- Phylum: Arthropoda
- Class: Insecta
- Order: Coleoptera
- Suborder: Polyphaga
- Infraorder: Cucujiformia
- Family: Cerambycidae
- Genus: Eodorcadion
- Species: E. virgatum

Binomial name
- Eodorcadion virgatum (Motschulsky, 1854)

Species of beetle

Eodorcadion virgatum is a species of beetle in the family Cerambycidae. It was described by Victor Motschulsky in 1854. It is known from Mongolia.

== Subspecies ==
- Eodorcadion virgatum subvirgatum (Pic, 1914)
- Eodorcadion virgatum virgatum (Motschulsky, 1854)
