= Paratorna schintlmeisteri =

Scientific classification
- Domain: Eukaryota
- Kingdom: Animalia
- Phylum: Arthropoda
- Class: Insecta
- Order: Lepidoptera
- Family: Tortricidae
- Genus: Paratorna
- Species: P. schintlmeisteri

Binomial name
- Paratorna schintlmeisteri Razowski, 1991

Species of moth

Paratorna schintlmeisteri is a species of moth of the family Tortricidae. It is found in the Philippines (Luzon).

The wingspan is about 14–16 mm.
