= Cnesteboda facilis =

Scientific classification
- Domain: Eukaryota
- Kingdom: Animalia
- Phylum: Arthropoda
- Class: Insecta
- Order: Lepidoptera
- Family: Tortricidae
- Genus: Cnesteboda
- Species: C. facilis

Binomial name
- Cnesteboda facilis (Meyrick, 1912)

Synonyms
- Eboda facilis Meyrick, 1912

Species of moth

Cnesteboda facilis is a species of moth of the family Tortricidae first described by Edward Meyrick in 1912. It is found in Assam, India.

The wingspan is 15–17 mm. Adults have been recorded on wing in June, July and October.
