= Dorcas Medical Mission =

Religious health organization

Dorcas Medical Mission, Inc. (DMMI) is a religious-based, non-profit, international organization. It provides medical, surgical, dental and vision care to the poor and underserved globally. Established in 2000, Dorcas Medical Mission was incorporated as a 501(c)(3) organization in August 2007, with corporate offices in Brooklyn, New York.

== History ==
Dorcas Medical Mission, Inc. was co-founded by president and chief executive officer, Lorna Mullings, a registered nurse and an ordained minister, and her husband Rev. Dr. Sidley Mullings. Lorna Mullings, whose strong faith and belief in God "called her to serve mankind through missionary work", combined her love for ministry and her skills as a registered nurse in creating DMMI. The organization was named after the biblical figure Dorcas (also called Tabitha), mentioned in the ninth chapter of the Book of Acts, verses 36 to 42. Dorcas stands out as a biblical character of good works and charitable deeds.

== Currently ==
Dorcas Medical Mission, Inc. performs two missions annually. To date, the non-profit has completed 16 missions to nine countries and served over 100,000 persons in the Caribbean, Africa, Latin America and South America. It hopes to continue expanding its geographical reach. In addition to providing health care services, DMMI also affects the lives of the disenfranchised through education, food and clothing programs.

Lorna Mullings continues as president and chief executive officer of DMMI alongside her husband and member of the board of directors, Dr. Bishop Sidley Mullings, Sharon Shorter MSN, RNC (DMMI's director of nursing), Dr. Hyacinth Bailey (dental director) and Dr. Bert Petersen (medical director).

== See also ==
- Dorcas society
