= Eodorcadion glaucopterum =

Scientific classification
- Domain: Eukaryota
- Kingdom: Animalia
- Phylum: Arthropoda
- Class: Insecta
- Order: Coleoptera
- Suborder: Polyphaga
- Infraorder: Cucujiformia
- Family: Cerambycidae
- Genus: Eodorcadion
- Species: E. glaucopterum

Binomial name
- Eodorcadion glaucopterum (Ganglbauer, 1883)

Species of beetle

Eodorcadion glaucopterum is a species of beetle in the family Cerambycidae. It was described by Ludwig Ganglbauer in 1883.
