= Cnesteboda variabilis =

Scientific classification
- Domain: Eukaryota
- Kingdom: Animalia
- Phylum: Arthropoda
- Class: Insecta
- Order: Lepidoptera
- Family: Tortricidae
- Genus: Cnesteboda
- Species: C. variabilis

Binomial name
- Cnesteboda variabilis (Diakonoff, 1941)

Synonyms
- Eboda variabilis Diakonoff, 1941

Species of moth

Cnesteboda variabilis is a species of moth of the family Tortricidae. It is found in Indonesia (Java).
