= Jennie Dorcas Fellows =

Editor, Dewey Decimal Classification

- Born: April 4, 1873; Norwich, Connecticut
- Died: October 10, 1938 (aged 65)
- Other names: Dorcas Fellows, Dorkas Fellows
- Occupation(s): Editor, Dewey Decimal Classification
- Known for: Cataloging Rules

Jennie Dorcas Fellows (April 4, 1873 – October 10, 1938), also known as Dorcas Fellows and Dorkas Fellows, was an author and instructor of library cataloging at the New York State Library. Her book, Cataloging Rules, originally published in 1914 as bulletin 36 of the New York State Library School, remains in print in its many editions and formats.

Fellows edited the Dewey Decimal Classification (DDC) from 1921 to 1937. She took over the 11th edition after the death of May Seymour, but the first full edition that she issued was the 12th. This edition was 25% larger than the previous edition, and was well received. The 13th edition published in 1932, edited by Fellows, grew again by one-third, adding over four hundred pages and bringing the printed classification to 1,647 pages.

Fellows embraced Melvil Dewey's spelling reform, and continued to published the classification using the reformed spelling standard. Letters sent between Fellows and Dewey were written in an even further reduced shorthand, such as:

"d n order paper. I l get tt i tym. Giv whn redi t order final decision o syz & weit."

It was during this time that she also changed the spelling of her name from Dorcas to Dorkas, in accord with Dewey's spelling reform rules.

In 1927, Fellows moved the DDC editorial offices from the Lake Placid Club to an office in the Library of Congress. Shortly afterward, Decimal Classification numbers began appearing on the Library of Congress cataloging cards that were sold to thousands of libraries for use in their catalogs.

She died in 1938, while still working on the 14th edition of the classification.
