= Cnesteboda davidsoni =

Scientific classification
- Kingdom: Animalia
- Phylum: Arthropoda
- Class: Insecta
- Order: Lepidoptera
- Family: Tortricidae
- Genus: Cnesteboda
- Species: C. davidsoni

Binomial name
- Cnesteboda davidsoni Razowski, 2000

Species of moth

Cnesteboda davidsoni is a moth of the family Tortricidae. It is found in Taiwan.

Adults are on wing in mid-May. The type series was collected in Shanping, Kaohsiung at 640 m (2,100 ft) above sea level.
