= Eodorcadion licenti =

Scientific classification
- Kingdom: Animalia
- Phylum: Arthropoda
- Class: Insecta
- Order: Coleoptera
- Suborder: Polyphaga
- Infraorder: Cucujiformia
- Family: Cerambycidae
- Genus: Eodorcadion
- Species: E. licenti

Binomial name
- Eodorcadion licenti (Pic, 1939)

Species of beetle

Eodorcadion licenti is a species of beetle in the family Cerambycidae. It was described by Maurice Pic in 1939.
