= Eodorcadion tuvense =

Scientific classification
- Domain: Eukaryota
- Kingdom: Animalia
- Phylum: Arthropoda
- Class: Insecta
- Order: Coleoptera
- Suborder: Polyphaga
- Infraorder: Cucujiformia
- Family: Cerambycidae
- Genus: Eodorcadion
- Species: E. tuvense

Binomial name
- Eodorcadion tuvense Plavilstshikov, 1958

Species of beetle

Eodorcadion tuvense is a species of beetle in the family Cerambycidae. It was described by Plavilstshikov in 1958.
