= Eodorcadion gorbunovi =

Scientific classification
- Domain: Eukaryota
- Kingdom: Animalia
- Phylum: Arthropoda
- Class: Insecta
- Order: Coleoptera
- Suborder: Polyphaga
- Infraorder: Cucujiformia
- Family: Cerambycidae
- Genus: Eodorcadion
- Species: E. gorbunovi

Binomial name
- Eodorcadion gorbunovi Danilevsky, 2004

Species of beetle

Eodorcadion gorbunovi is a species of beetle in the family Cerambycidae. It was described by Mikhail Leontievich Danilevsky in 2004. It is known from Mongolia.
