= Eodorcadion egregium =

Scientific classification
- Kingdom: Animalia
- Phylum: Arthropoda
- Class: Insecta
- Order: Coleoptera
- Suborder: Polyphaga
- Infraorder: Cucujiformia
- Family: Cerambycidae
- Genus: Eodorcadion
- Species: E. egregium

Binomial name
- Eodorcadion egregium (Reitter, 1897)

Synonyms
- Eodorcadion albitarsale Breuning, 1966

Species of beetle

Eodorcadion egregium is a species of beetle in the family Cerambycidae. It was described by Reitter in 1897. It is known from Mongolia.
