= Cnesteboda anisocornutana =

Scientific classification
- Kingdom: Animalia
- Phylum: Arthropoda
- Class: Insecta
- Order: Lepidoptera
- Family: Tortricidae
- Genus: Cnesteboda
- Species: C. anisocornutana

Binomial name
- Cnesteboda anisocornutana (Razowski, 1964)

Synonyms
- Eboda anisocornutana Razowski, 1964

Species of moth

Cnesteboda anisocornutana is a species of moth of the family Tortricidae. It is found in India (Assam) and Burma.
