= Appleton-le-Street with Easthorpe =

Civil parish in North Yorkshire, England

Coordinates: 54.15198°N 0.872383°W

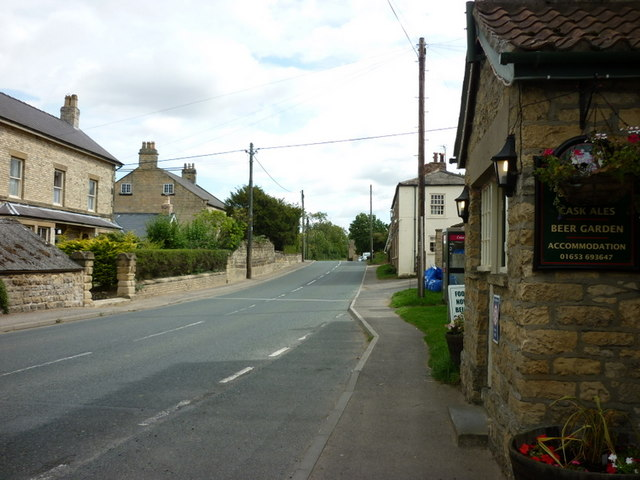
- Main road through Appleton-le-Street

- Location within North Yorkshire
- Population: 122 (2011 Census)
- OS grid reference: SE 73657 73524
- Civil parish: Appleton-le-Street with Easthorpe
- Unitary authority: North Yorkshire
- Ceremonial county: North Yorkshire
- Region: Yorkshire and the Humber
- Country: England
- Sovereign state: United Kingdom
- Post town: Malton
- Postcode district: YO17
- Dialling code: 01653
- Police: North Yorkshire
- Fire: North Yorkshire
- Ambulance: Yorkshire
- UK Parliament: Thirsk and Malton

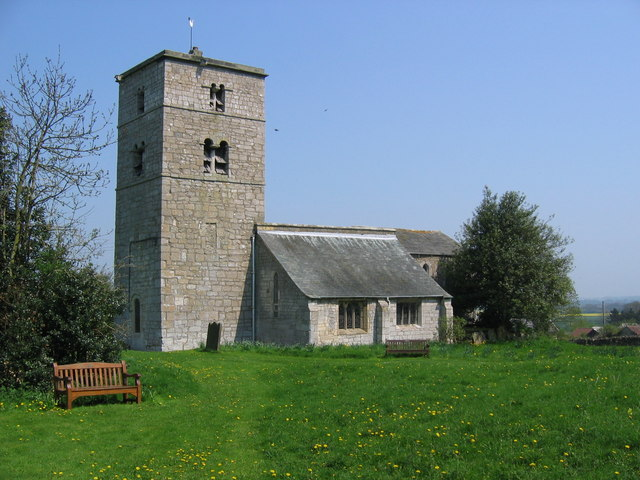
All Saints Church, Appleton-le-Street

Appleton-le-Street with Easthorpe is a civil parish in North Yorkshire, England, consisting of Appleton-le-Street and Easthorpe. The parish contained the townships of Swinton, Broughton, Hildenley with a chapel at Amotherby called All Saints. The parish also lies just north of the River Rye. The parish had a population of 117 in the 2001 census and 122 in the 2011 census.

Appleton-le-Street is 4 miles (6.4 km) west of the town of Malton. Easthorpe is a small village south of Appleton-le-Street and 3 miles (5 km) from Malton.

In the 1870s Appleton-le-Street was described as:

"a township and a parish in Malton district, N. R. Yorkshire. The township lies on the Roman road to Aldborough, near the river Rye, 3½ miles WNW of New Malton r. station. Acres, 1,140. Real property, £1,815. Pop., 185. Houses, 36."

Between 1974 and 2023 the parish was part of the Ryedale district. It is now administered by the unitary North Yorkshire Council.

== Population ==
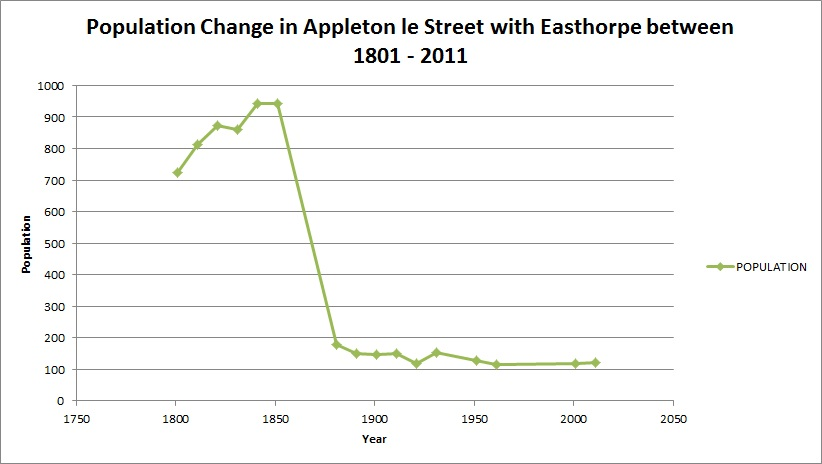
Total Population of Appleton le Street with Easthorpe between 1801 and 2011

The graph shows that between 1801 and 1851 the parish of Appleton-le-Street with Easthorpe had a population of between 730 and 940. In 1866 the townships became civil parishes, for which separate statistics were reported, and from the next available population census statistics in 1881 until 2011, the population was only between 120 and 170.

== History ==
The notable All Saints church is situated just north of Easthorpe in Appleton-le-Street. It is a Grade I listed Saxon church which escaped "improvement" by the Victorians. The earliest written reference to a church at Appleton is in a charter of King Henry II (1154–1189). It is curiously omitted from the Domesday Book, yet it is beyond dispute that there was a church at that time. The first reference in the register to Appleton is on 20 September 1232 when Stephen de (Eglefeld?) was instituted as first rector. Inside, effigies date from the 13th and 14th centuries and some interior woodwork dates from 1636.

The name Appleton-le-Street means "apple orchard on a Roman road". Easthorpe directly translates to, "east outlying farm or settlement". With east simply translating to eastern, and thorpe directly translating to a secondary settlement and a dependent outlying farm or hamlet.

== Occupational structure ==
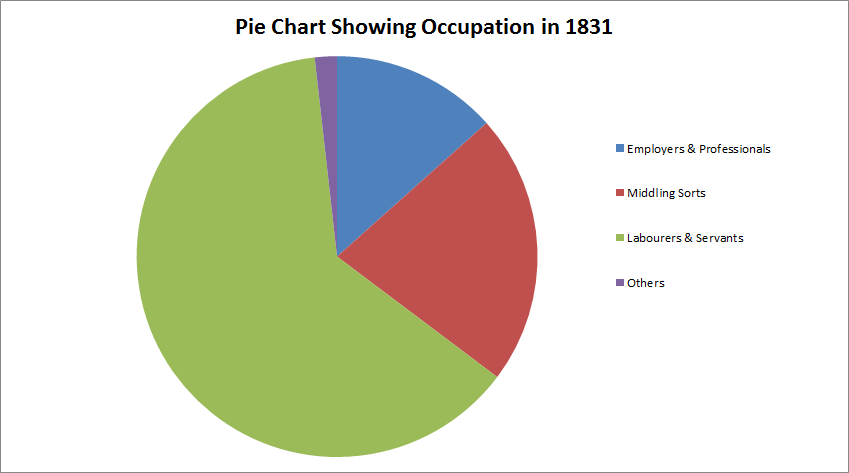
Occupational spread in 1831

The pie chart shows that the majority of people worked as labourers and servants, and just under 25% of the population were small farmers not employing labourers, with both masters and skilled workers in urban manufacturing and handicrafts. Then there were around 30 professionals and employers in 1831.

By 1881, the number of professionals had decreased to three people, one male and two females. The majority of men in 1881 still worked in agriculture, whilst the majority of women worked in the 'Unknown Sector'. The men mostly worked in hard labour jobs whilst women worked in more domestic occupations.

== Housing ==
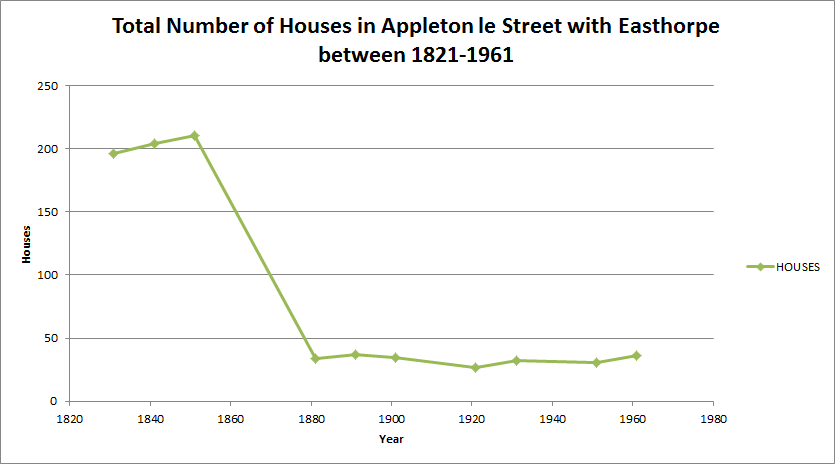
Total numbers of households between 1831 and 1961

The line graph shows that the total number of houses, between around 1831 and 1851, was between 196 and 210 respectively, and the occupancy graph shows that just under 90% were occupied in 1831, which means there were 21 vacant at the time, but that reduced to only nine in 1851.

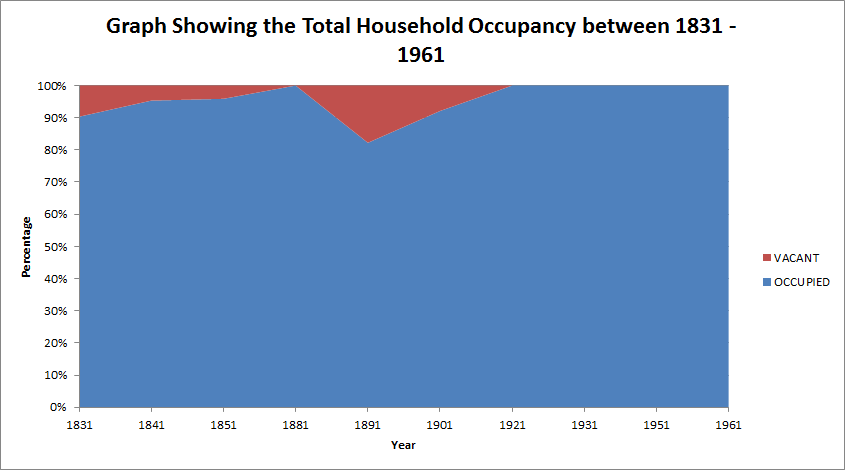
Percentage of households occupied between 1831 and 1961

After 1851, the number of houses declined to only 34 in 1881, and then remained stable until 1961 when the total number of homes is 36. There were no vacant houses in 1881 but then by 1891 only around 75% of the houses were occupied, with eight homes being vacant, until around 1921; then all the houses are occupied again all the way to 1961.

== Amenities ==
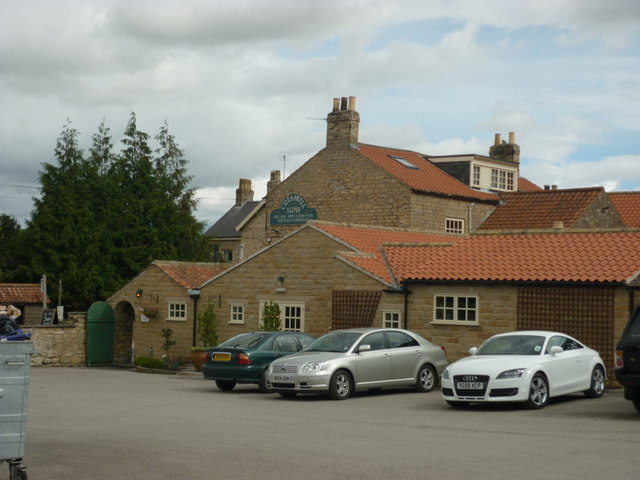
Cresswell Arms, Appleton-le-Street

The parish has two hotels and lodges. In the area of Appleton-le-Street, on the edge of the North York Moors, is the Cresswell Arms, a traditional country inn dating back to the 1800s when it was flanked by a blacksmith and a butcher.

== See also ==
- Listed buildings in Appleton-le-Street with Easthorpe
