= Eodorcadion darigangense =

Scientific classification
- Domain: Eukaryota
- Kingdom: Animalia
- Phylum: Arthropoda
- Class: Insecta
- Order: Coleoptera
- Suborder: Polyphaga
- Infraorder: Cucujiformia
- Family: Cerambycidae
- Genus: Eodorcadion
- Species: E. darigangense

Binomial name
- Eodorcadion darigangense Heyrovsky, 1967

Species of beetle

Eodorcadion darigangense is a species of beetle in the family Cerambycidae. It was described by Heyrovský in 1967. It is known from Mongolia.
