= Paratorna catenulella =

Scientific classification
- Domain: Eukaryota
- Kingdom: Animalia
- Phylum: Arthropoda
- Class: Insecta
- Order: Lepidoptera
- Family: Tortricidae
- Genus: Paratorna
- Species: P. catenulella

Binomial name
- Paratorna catenulella (Christoph, 1882)

Synonyms
- Cryptolechia catenulella Christoph, 1882

Species of moth

Paratorna catenulella is a species of moth of the family Tortricidae. It is found in the Russian Far East, Japan (Honshu), the Korean Peninsula and China (Jilin, Heilongjiang, Jiangsu).

The wingspan is 14–19 mm.
