= Cnesteboda oenina =

Scientific classification
- Domain: Eukaryota
- Kingdom: Animalia
- Phylum: Arthropoda
- Class: Insecta
- Order: Lepidoptera
- Family: Tortricidae
- Genus: Cnesteboda
- Species: C. oenina

Binomial name
- Cnesteboda oenina (Diakonoff, 1976)

Synonyms
- Paratorna oenina Diakonoff, 1976

Species of moth

Cnesteboda oenina is a species of moth of the family Tortricidae. It is found in Nepal.
