= Easthorpe, North Yorkshire =

Village in North Yorkshire, England

Coordinates: 54.13398°N 0.87302°W

Easthorpe
- Location within North Yorkshire
- OS grid reference: SE737714
- Unitary authority: North Yorkshire
- Ceremonial county: North Yorkshire
- Region: Yorkshire and the Humber
- Country: England
- Sovereign state: United Kingdom
- Post town: MALTON
- Postcode district: YO17
- Police: North Yorkshire
- Fire: North Yorkshire
- Ambulance: Yorkshire

Easthorpe is a hamlet in North Yorkshire, England, located 3 miles (4.8 km) west of Malton. It is part of the Appleton-le-Street with Easthorpe civil parish. The settlement is recorded in the Domesday Book with two ploughlands and five households, and the name means East Village.

Easthorpe Hall was built c. 1755 and belonged to the Grimthorpe family until 1965. It was sold and became a nightclub, but it burnt to the ground in 1971.

== See also ==
- Listed buildings in Appleton-le-Street with Easthorpe
