= Dorcas Drake =

American judge (1916–1993)

Dorcas Broward Drake (September 23, 1916 – September 26, 1993) was an American judge, justice of the peace, and philanthropist.

The granddaughter of former Florida Governor Napoleon Bonaparte Broward, Drake was best known for starting the Dorcas Drake Christmas Party and Toy Drive in Jacksonville, Florida. It was held every Christmas from 1957 until 1993. From 1993 through 2003, the party was continued by her daughter Jonetta Drake and family. Dorcas Drake dressed in a Santa Claus costume and presented gifts to needy children. At one point, it was estimated that Dorcas Drake's toys went to 50,000 children in Jacksonville every holiday season. The toy drive and party have since been replaced by the Children's Christmas Party of Jacksonville, which was first held in 1999.

In 1989, she was honored by The Mayor's Commission on the Status of Women for Women's History Month. She died at the age of 77 of cancer.
