= Paratorna dorcas =

Scientific classification
- Domain: Eukaryota
- Kingdom: Animalia
- Phylum: Arthropoda
- Class: Insecta
- Order: Lepidoptera
- Family: Tortricidae
- Genus: Paratorna
- Species: P. dorcas

Binomial name
- Paratorna dorcas Meyrick, 1907

Species of moth

Paratorna dorcas is a species of moth of the family Tortricidae. It is found in Indonesia (Java) and India (Assam).
