= Dorcas society =

Group with a mission of providing clothing to the poor

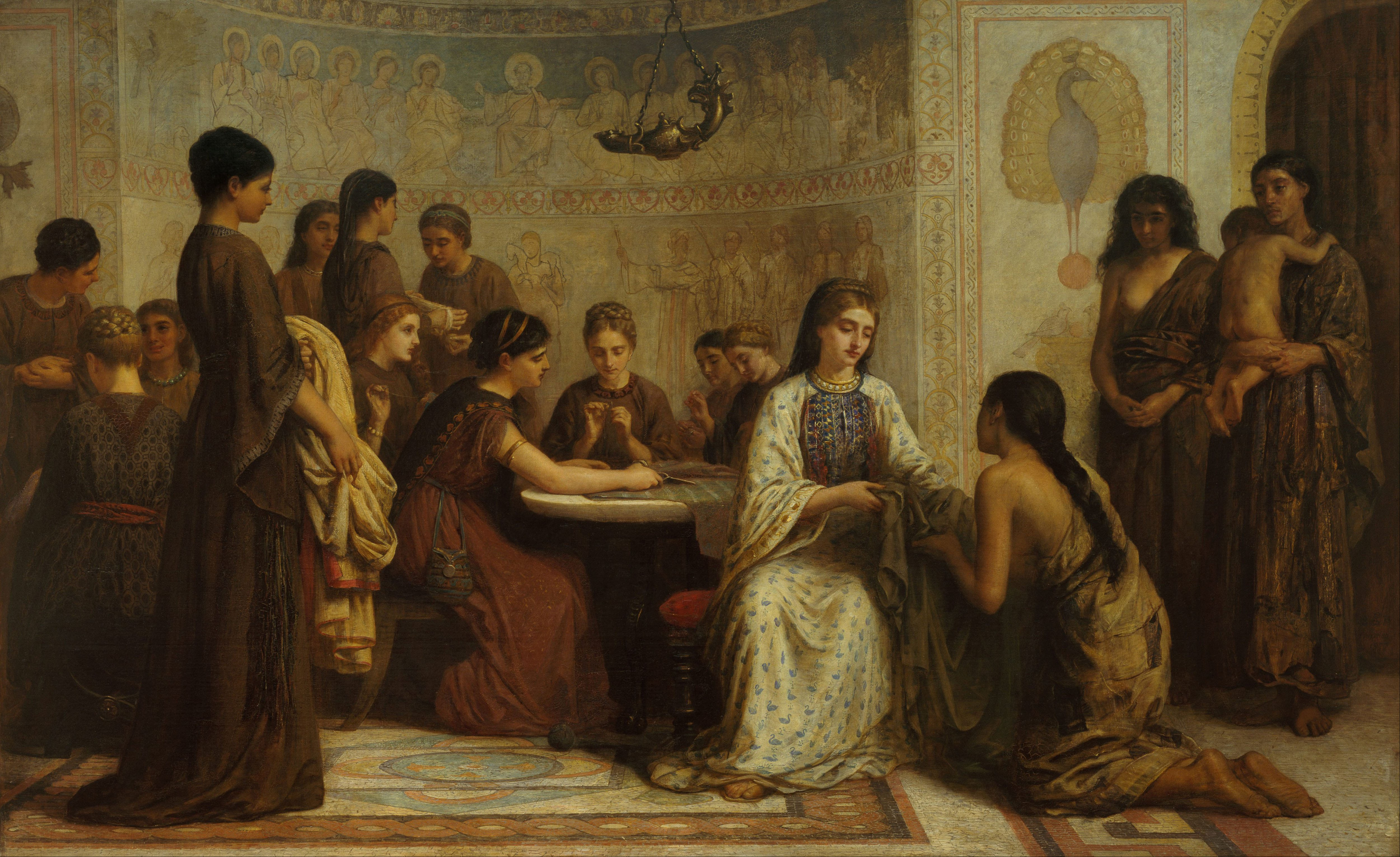
Edwin Long's A Dorcas Meeting in the 6th Century (painted 1873–1877) imagines a Dorcas society of Late antiquity.

A Dorcas society is a local group of people, usually based in a church, with a mission of providing clothing to the poor. Dorcas societies are named after Dorcas (also called Tabitha), a person described in the Acts of the Apostles (9:36).

Dorcas societies were at their height in the 1800s, but there are still Dorcas societies around the world, providing clothing and other physical needs.

One Dorcas society was founded in Douglas, Isle of Man, in December 1834 as part of the community's thanksgiving for being spared from an outbreak of cholera. Other Dorcas societies were established by missionaries in the Americas in the early 1800s. Beatrice Clugston founded the Glasgow Royal Dorcas Society in 1864. One English Dorcas society in Sydenham, London, met during five Tuesdays in Lent, producing 166 garments in one year.

The Dorcas Society at St Paul's Chapel of Trinity Church Parish, New York City, was founded in 1850; another Trinity Chapel, St John's, also had a Dorcas Society; the two provided clothing to school children in the parish. The Dorcas Society of Maine was founded in 1897 by Kate Douglas Wiggin as the Dorcas Society of Hollis & Buxton, Maine. The Dorcas Society of Maine is still active and provides academic scholarships and charitable contributions within its community.

== See also ==
- African Dorcas Association, a 19th-century Dorcas Society of New York City
- Dorcas Medical Mission
- Sewing circle
