= Eodorcadion dorcas =

Scientific classification
- Domain: Eukaryota
- Kingdom: Animalia
- Phylum: Arthropoda
- Class: Insecta
- Order: Coleoptera
- Suborder: Polyphaga
- Infraorder: Cucujiformia
- Family: Cerambycidae
- Genus: Eodorcadion
- Species: E. dorcas

Binomial name
- Eodorcadion dorcas (Jakovlev, 1901)

Species of beetle

Eodorcadion dorcas is a species of beetle in the family Cerambycidae. It was described by Jakovlev in 1901 and is known from Mongolia.

== Subspecies ==
- Eodorcadion dorcas annulatum Heyrovský, 1969
- Eodorcadion dorcas dorcas (Jakovlev, 1901)
- Eodorcadion dorcas fortecostatum Heyrovský, 1969
- Eodorcadion dorcas hircus Jakovlev, 1906
- Eodorcadion dorcas morosum (Jakovlev, 1901)
- Eodorcadion dorcas scabrosum Namhaidorzh, 1972
