= May Seymour =

American librarian

Evelyn May Seymour (August 31, 1857 – June 14, 1921) was an American librarian who collaborated closely with Melvil Dewey on the Dewey Decimal Classification (DDC). Seymour edited eight editions of the DDC.

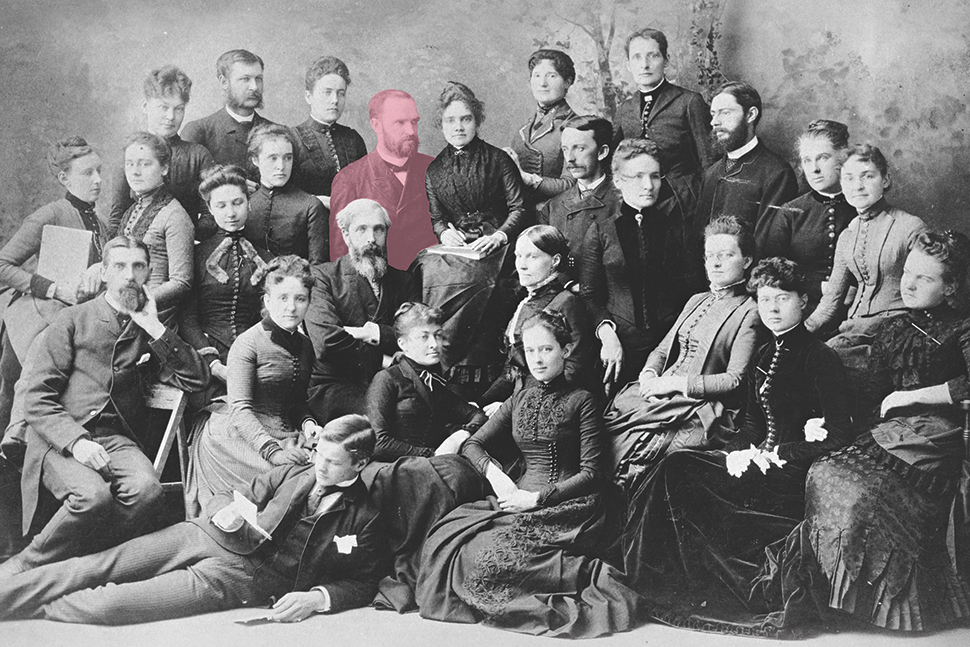
The 1887-1888 class of the School of Library Economy at Columbia College. May Seymour is in the third row, fourth from left.

== Biography ==
Evelyn May Seymour was born on August 31, 1857, in Binghamton, New York.

She studied library science and worked as a cataloger for the Osterhout Free Library and Columbia College. She was one of 20 students in Melvil Dewey's first librarianship class at Columbia College, held from 1887 to 1888. In the spring of 1889, Dewey was appointed New York State Librarian; he took his library school with him from Columbia to Albany, New York. May Seymour was one of the five instructors who moved with it. She also worked at the New York State Library, where she was in charge of classification.

Seymour collaborated closely with Dewey on the development of the Dewey Decimal Classification (DDC) and the preparation of the 1904 American Library Association (ALA) catalog, which listed over 8,000 books essential for libraries. In the 1890s, Seymour and Florence Woodworth boarded with the Deweys. Dewey's behavior towards the two women disturbed other members of the ALA, who censured Dewey in 1906.

In February 1906, Edwin Anderson fired Seymour from the New York State Library. Seymour moved to Dewey's Lake Placid Club, where she worked on editing the fourth through eleventh editions of the DDC.

She died in Lake Placid on June 14, 1921.
