= All Saints' Church, Appleton-le-Street =

Church in Appleton-le-Street, North Yorkshire, England

Coordinates: 54°09′10″N 0°52′38″W

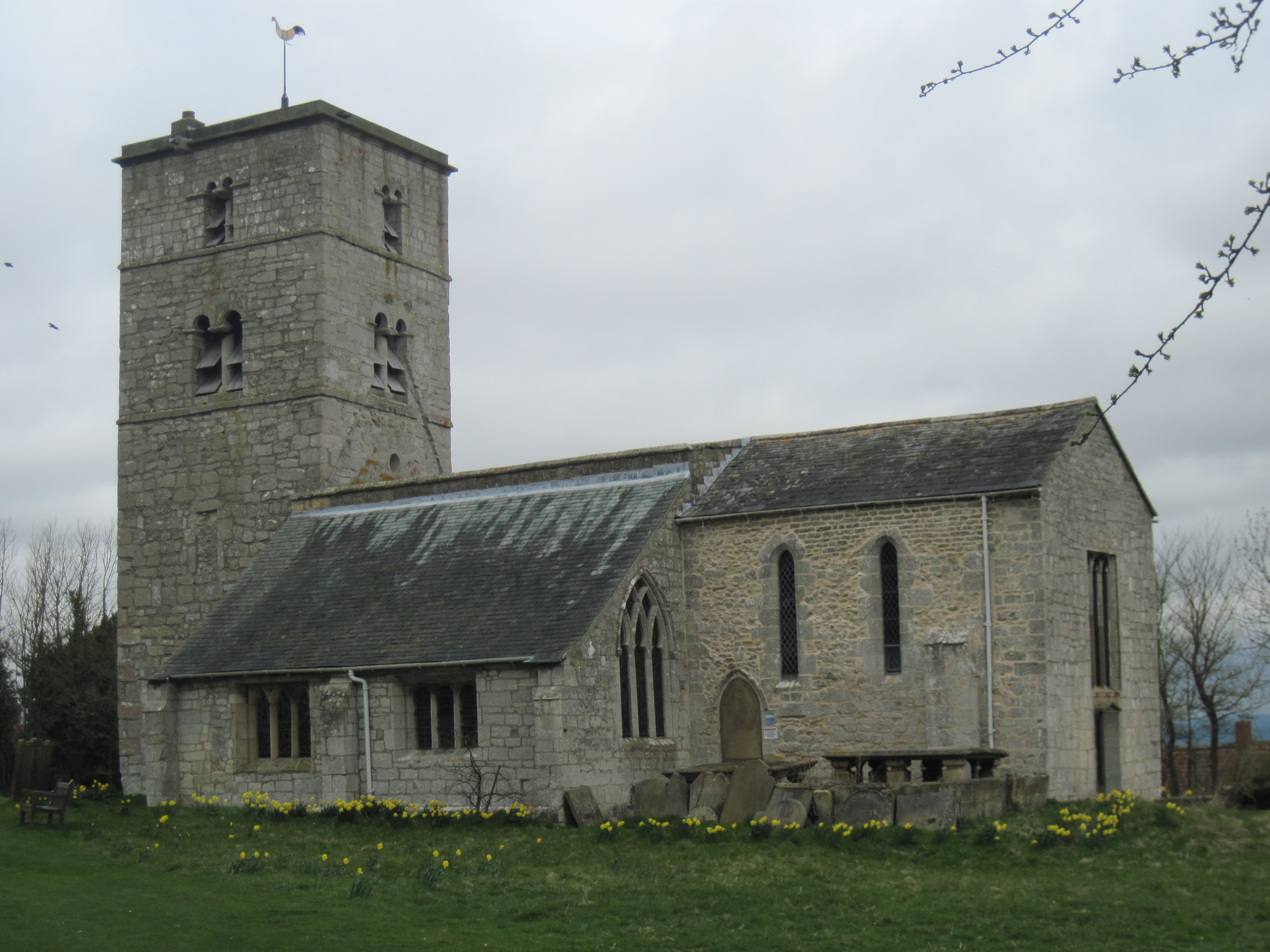
The church, in 2013

All Saints' Church is the parish church of Appleton-le-Street, a village in North Yorkshire, in England.

== History ==
The church was originally built in the early 11th century, from which period the tower survives. In the 12th century, the tower arch was enlarged, and a north door was added to the tower. The chancel dates from the early 13th century, with the north aisle dating from the late 13th century, and the south aisle from around 1300. The chancel was shortened in the late 15th century, since when, the only structural change has been the addition of a north porch. The building was Grade I listed in 1954.

== Architecture ==
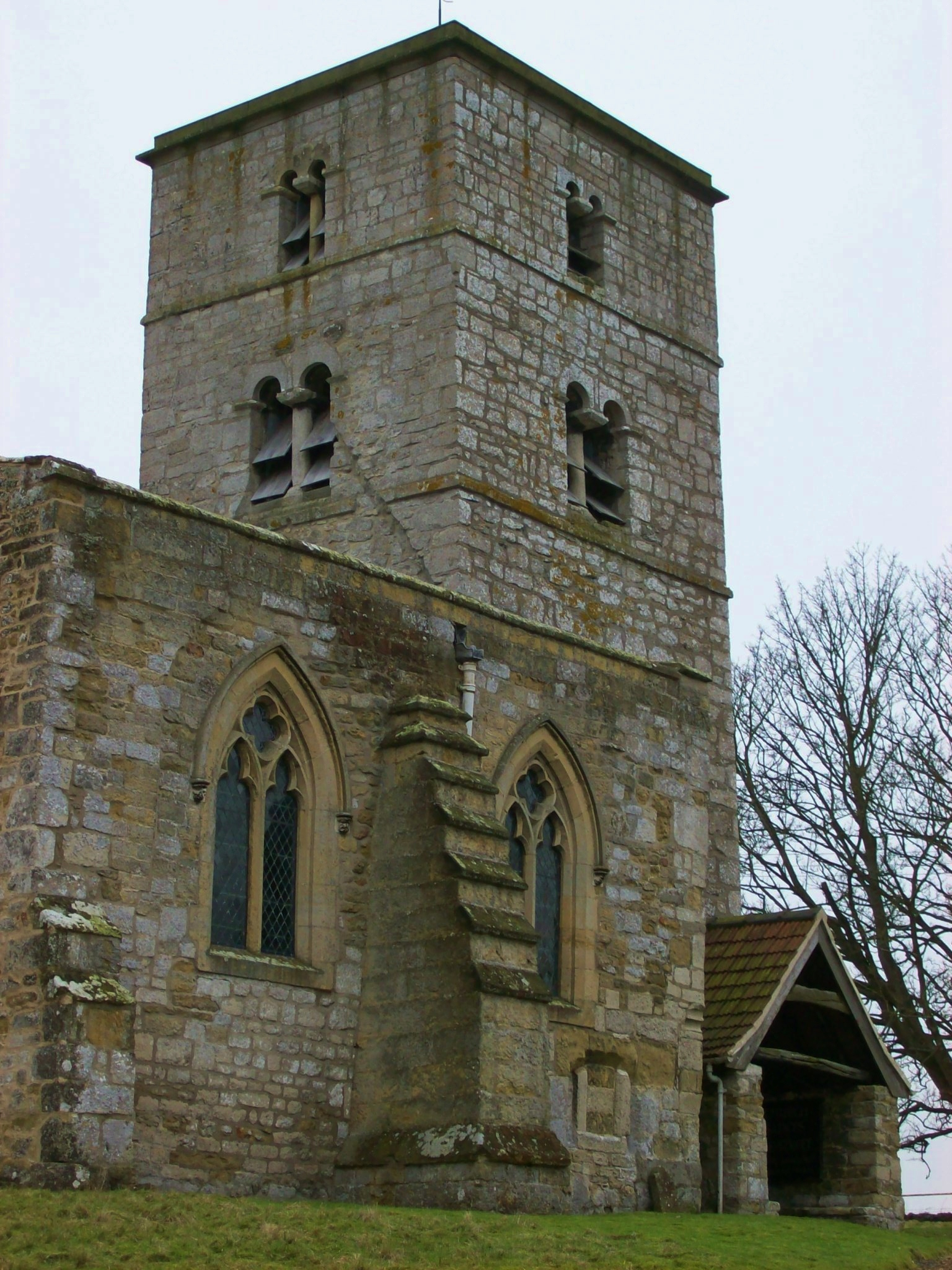
View of the tower, from the north

The church is built of sandstone and has slate roofs. It consists of a west tower, two-bay nave with aisles, and a chancel. The tower has three stages, with a round-arched window, paired bell openings to the second and third stages, a north door with carvings in the surround, and a damaged sculpture of the Virgin and Child above. The south aisle has small buttresses, and the north aisle a large buttress. There are a variety of windows, some with trefoil heads.

Inside the church, there is an aumbry and a rough piscina, a 12th-century font with an octagonal 17th-century cover, and an altar table and rails dating from 1637. There are two 14th-century effigies of women from the Bolton family.
