= Dorcas =

Early female disciple of Jesus

Saint Dorcas
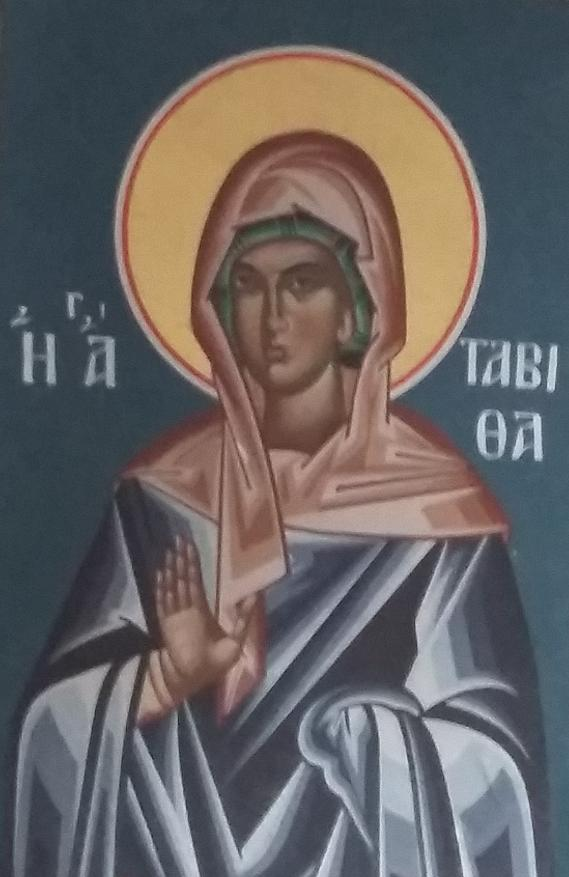
- Saint Tabitha on a Greek Orthodox Church icon (mural)

Witness to the Faith
- Honored in: All Christian denominations that venerate saints
- Feast: 27 January; 25 October

Dorcas (Greek: Δορκάς, romanized: Dorkás), or Tabitha (Imperial Aramaic: טביתא/ܛܒܝܬܐ, romanized: Ṭaḇīṯā, lit. '(female) gazelle'), was an early disciple of Jesus mentioned in the Acts of the Apostles (Acts 9:36–43, see discussion here). She lived in the port city of Joppa, today absorbed by Tel Aviv. Acts describes her as being known for her "good works and acts of mercy", sewing clothes for the poor. When she died, the widows of her community mourned her and sent urgently for Peter (Acts 9:38), who was in nearby Lydda. As evidence of her charity, they showed him some of the clothes she had sewn, and according to the biblical account he raised her from the dead.

She is celebrated as a saint by the Catholic Church, Eastern Orthodox Church, the Anglican Communion, and some Protestant denominations.

== Name ==
Both her Jewish name, which is in Aramaic, rendered as Tabitha, and her Greek one, Dorcas, translate to '[female] gazelle'. The equivalent Hebrew name is Zibiah, also spelled Tsibiah, a name carried by the mother of King Joash of Judah. Some explain the use of a Greek variant of Tabitha's Syriac Aramaic name by the fact that she was living in a port city, where many inhabitants and visitors would primarily communicate in Greek. Dorcas was a common name of the time both among Jews and Greeks. Today, the scientific name of one species of gazelle is Gazella dorcas, the dorcas gazelle.

The Greek verb used in Acts 9:36 is διερμηνεύω, transliterated diermēneuō, which means "to interpret fully, to explain", and in this passage it is rendered "is by interpretation", which in context leads to the literal meaning: "Tabitha, meaning Dorcas" (i.e. 'gazelle').

== Position in her community ==
It is unclear whether Dorcas was herself poor or a widow. Acts describes her as beloved in the specifically Christian community at Joppa, and by implication prominent in it. This might also be indicated by the fact that Peter took the trouble to come to her from a neighbouring city, when requested by the community members.

Although widowhood has been associated with poverty and dependence in the early modern Western mind, that was not necessarily the case for Dorcas. The Bible describes a variety of widows, both poor and rich, powerful and dependent. Under Roman law in this era, when a woman's father died, she would become legally independent and would conventionally inherit an equal share of his property along with her siblings. She controlled this property herself even if married. If her husband died, she would also recover her dowry, which would have been controlled, and possibly managed or invested, by her husband during their marriage. Thus a woman could actually become wealthier when her husband died. If Dorcas was a wealthy benefactress on the model of Mary Magdalene, then she nevertheless humbly sewed the clothes herself rather than simply buying them.

== Death and burial sites ==
According to the New Testament, Tabitha died in Joppa, at the house of Simon the tanner. The house where she reportedly died and was resurrected by Saint Peter can still be visited in Tel Aviv. When she allegedly died a second time, she was buried in what are now the gardens of an Orthodox Church in Jaffa, where her tomb can still be visited.

== In Christian tradition ==
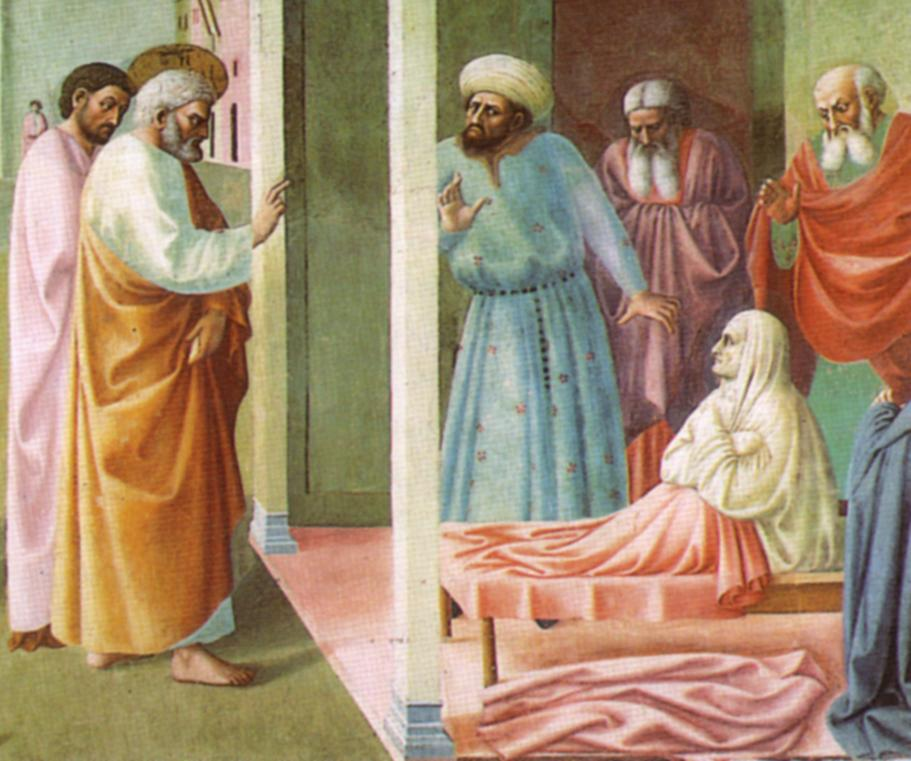
Detail of Healing of the Cripple and Raising of Tabitha by Masolino da Panicale, 1425

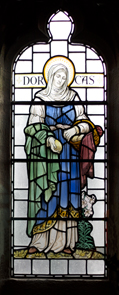
Dorcas Window St. Michael's Parish Church, Mytholmroyd, West Yorkshire

Basil of Caesarea refers to Dorcas as an example in his Morals (rule 74): "That a widow who enjoys sufficiently robust health should spend her life in works of zeal and solicitude, keeping in mind the words of the Apostle and the example of Dorcas." She is also commemorated in poems by Robert Herrick ("The Widows' Tears: Or, Dirge of Dorcas") and George MacDonald ("Dorcas").

=== Feast ===
Though some sources affirm that Catholic Church commemorates St Tabitha on October 25, the latest official edition of the Roman Martyrology has no mention of a commemoration of Dorcas or Tabitha on that or any other day. The same date is given as that of the celebration in the Eastern Church.

Dorcas societies, which provide clothing to the poor, are named after her.

The Eastern Orthodox Church celebrates Saint Tabitha the Widow, raised from the dead by the Apostle Peter, on October 25.

The Evangelical Lutheran Church in America holds a joint commemoration for Dorcas with Lydia and Phoebe on January 27, immediately after the male missionaries remembered after the feast of St. Paul's Conversion, but the Lutheran Church Missouri Synod (LCMS) commemorates these three faithful women on October 25.

In 2022, Dorcas was officially added to the Episcopal Church liturgical calendar with a feast day on 25 October.

== In art ==
Depictions of Dorcas in art can be found as early as the fourth century, and her raising is often included in Medieval and Renaissance illustrations of the life of Saint Peter.

Dorcas's acts of charity are a common subject of stained glass church windows. She is represented in a window in the apse of Christ Church, Bath, on the south side of St Peter's Church, Caversham, in St. Andrew's Church, Cheddar, in the sacristy of Calvary Episcopal Church (Pittsburgh), in The First Presbyterian Church of Chicago, in Llandaff Cathedral in Cardiff, in St Leonard's Church, Bridgnorth, in Castleton Parish Church in Derbyshire, on the north side of St. Nicholas' church in Castle Hedingham in Essex, in the Ladychapel of St Michael's Church in Mytholmroyd, West Yorkshire, in an oriel window at the Head Office of the Retail Trust in north London, in a window in St Andrew's Church in Moretonhampstead and in a window at St John the Evangelist Church in Cinderford.

The Lady chapel of St Patrick's Cathedral, Dublin, has a window of Dorcas with the legend: "Dorcas this woman was full of good works and almsdeeds". Christ Church, St. Joseph, Missouri, depicts her holding a blue cloth in a prominent nave window (1885) on the south side. Grace and Holy Trinity Episcopal Church in Richmond, Virginia, has her in a window made in Germany around 1890.

Dorcas and Cornelius are represented on the stained glass windows above the altar in the Emmanuel Anglican Church in Lawson, New South Wales. In the church of St. Lawrence, Weston under Penyard, Herefordshire, she is depicted with St. Paul in a pair of stained glass windows dedicated to the memory of Edward Burdett Hawkshaw, the Rector from 1854 to 1912, and his wife, Catherine (a photograph nearby in the church shows that his likeness is the face given to St. Paul, while Dorcas has the face of Mrs. Hawkshaw).

Dorcas is referenced in Gene Wolfe's "The Book of the New Sun", through a character who shares her name. The name Dorcas is also used for a character in Stephen King’s novel “Rose Madder”.

== See also ==
- Dorcas society, name used for philanthropic societies inspired by biblical Tabitha/Dorcas
- Sabil Abu Nabbut, Muslim fountain at Jaffa (c. 1815), pointed out to Western travellers as standing at the burial site of Tabitha/Dorcas
