= Corruption in the United Kingdom =

Corruption in the United Kingdom is generally low compared to most nations, though problems persist. Transparency International's 2024 Corruption Perceptions Index scored the United Kingdom at 71, but the 2025 Index scored it at 70 on a scale from 0 ("highly corrupt") to 100 ("very clean") - its lowest ever score since the current system of scoring began in 2012. When ranked by score, the United Kingdom ranked 20th among the 182 countries in the Index, where the country ranked first is perceived to have the most honest public sector. The United Kingdom's highest ever score was 82 in 2017, placing it in 8th position. Its highest position was 7th, during the years 2014-16 (with scores of 78, 81 and 81, respectively). It left the top ten rankings in 2018 (score 80; 11th position) and entered 20th position in 2023 (scoring 71), a fall of nine places in two years and its lowest ever ranking since 2012.

For comparison with regional scores, the best score in 2025 among Western European and European Union countries (Note: Austria, Belgium, Bulgaria, Croatia, Cyprus, Czechia, Denmark, Estonia, Finland, France, Germany, Greece, Hungary, Iceland, Ireland, Italy, Latvia, Lithuania, Luxembourg, Malta, Netherlands, Norway, Poland, Portugal, Romania, Slovakia, Slovenia, Spain, Sweden, Switzerland, and the United Kingdom.) was 89, the average score was 64 and the worst score was 40. For comparison with worldwide scores, the best score was 89 (ranked 1), the average score was 42, and the worst score was 9 (ranked 181, in a two-way tie).

The United Kingdom's 2025 drop to its lowest ever score of 70 was attributed by Transparency International to political donors receiving favours, Members of Parliament acting as lobbyists, and the Epstein-Mandelson controversy. Transparency International raised concerns about record political campaign spending, reliance on wealthy benefactors, and allegations of cash for access arrangements. Along with the Epstein-Mandelson scandal, specifically mentioned by Transparency International were the Conservatives accepting £15m from a single donor in less than 12 months (understood to be a reference to donations from Frank Hester), Elon Musk considering making a $100m donation to Reform UK, and Waheed Alli, Labour's biggest donor, receiving a privileged pass to the Prime Minister.

The United Kingdom currently has numerous laws that punish civil servants for bribery and other forms of corruption, with the Bribery Act 2010 currently the most relevant. There has also been criticism from newspaper columnists. This has largely been because of the UK's fall from the top 10 in the CPI.

The Bribery Act 2010 is currently the most relevant law in the United Kingdom that punishes public and private bribery. The law does not make any distinction in sentencing between those who bribe (or are bribed) in the public or private sector.

== See also ==
- Cash for access
- Cash for influence
- Cash-for-Honours scandal
- Cash-for-questions affair
- Crime in the United Kingdom
- Influence peddling
- List of political scandals in the United Kingdom
- Police corruption in the United Kingdom
- Corruption in Wales
