= 2011 cash for influence scandal =

In 2011, the European Commission’s Anti-fraud Office (OLAF) opened a formal investigation for corruption against four Members of European Parliament (MEPs)—Romanian Adrian Severin, Austrian Ernst Strasser, Spaniard Pablo Zalba Bidegain (who was cleared of wrongdoing as he had not accepted payment), and Slovenian Zoran Thaler—after an article in The Sunday Times claimed that they had tried to influence EU legislation in exchange for money. The Sunday Times journalists went undercover and approached 60 MEPs, posing as lobbyists and requesting votes to table or support certain amendments in exchange for money.

== Indictments ==
Strasser and Thaler resigned in March 2011; Strasser was sentenced to four years in jail on 14 January 2013. OLAF dismissed the case against Thaler, claiming that it had been unable to find "evidence to support suspicion of wrongdoing" (though it did blame the European Parliament for "refus[ing] to provide the necessary support during the investigation"). However, in January 2014 Slovenia's own judicial system found Thaler guilty and sentenced him to two and a half years in prison.

Claiming innocence, Adrian Severin has refused to step down and continues to work as an MEP, even after he was expelled by the Socialists & Democrats (S&D) group of the European Parliament. He was indicted by Romania's anti-corruption agency in September 2013 and in February 2016, he was convicted to three and half years in prison in court, although the judgement was appealed. On 16 November 2016, a final sentence was handed down and his sentence was increased to 4 years imprisonment. He still has the support of the Social Democratic Party, his political party in Romania.

== See also ==
- Cash for access
- Cash for influence
- Influence peddling
