= List of political scandals in the United Kingdom =

This is a list of political scandals in the United Kingdom in chronological order. Scandals implicating political figures or governments of the UK, often reported in the mass media, have long had repercussions for their popularity. Issues in political scandals have included alleged or proven financial and sexual matters, or various other allegations or actions taken by politicians that led to controversy. In British media and political discourse, such scandals have sometimes been referred to as political sleaze since the 1990s. Notable scandals include the Marconi scandal, Profumo affair and the 2009 expenses scandal.

== 1890s ==
- Liberator Building Society scandal, in which the Liberal Party MP Jabez Balfour was exposed as running several fraudulent companies to conceal financial losses. Balfour fled to Argentina, but was eventually arrested and imprisoned.

== 1910s ==
- Marconi scandal of insider trading by Liberal Party Ministers including:
  - Rufus Isaacs, 1st Marquess of Reading, the Attorney General
  - The Master of Elibank, Lord Murray, the Treasurer of the Liberal Party,
  - David Lloyd George, 1st Earl Lloyd-George of Dwyfor, the Chancellor of the Exchequer
  - Herbert Samuel, 1st Viscount Samuel, Postmaster General; was falsely implicated. (1912)
- Shell Crisis of 1915, which led to the fall of H. H. Asquith's Liberal Party government during World War I.

== 1920s ==
- Lloyd George (Liberal) and the honours scandal. Honours sold for large campaign contributions (1922)
- Zinoviev Letter (1924)

== 1930s ==
- Jimmy Thomas (National Labour) budget leak (1936)

== 1940s ==
- Hugh Dalton (Labour) budget leak (1947)
- John Belcher (Labour) corruptly influenced the Board of Trade – led to Lynskey Tribunal

== 1950s ==
- British Malayan headhunting scandal (1952). Involved generals, the military, politicians, and activists, sparked by the Daily Worker's leaked photos of war crimes (notably headhunting) committed by British troops during the Malayan Emergency. (During Conservative rule)
- Crichel Down and the resignation of Thomas Dugdale (Conservative) (1954)
- Suez Crisis (1956) (during Conservative rule)

== 1960s ==
- Vassall affair (1963): civil servant John Vassall, working for Minister Tam Galbraith, was revealed to be a spy for the Soviet Union and was arrested. The affair was investigated in the Vassall tribunal.
- Profumo affair (1963): Secretary of State for War John Profumo (Conservative) had an affair with Christine Keeler (to whom he had been introduced by artist Stephen Ward), who was having an affair with a Soviet spy at the same time.
- The Robert Boothby (Conservative), Tom Driberg (Labour), Kray twins affair and consequent cover-up involving senior politicians of both parties. The rumour was that the politicians "had been importuning males at a dog track and were involved with gangs of thugs who dispose of their money at the tracks". The Daily Mirror published some details of the matter and was falsely sued for libel.
- Britain's Nuclear Bomb Tests Scandal (1950s and 1960s): the catastrophic effects of nuclear testing in Australia and the South Pacific. Very serious environmental damage and health conditions emerged. Many communities and nationalities such as the Aborigine, South Pacific islanders, Australian and British were affected. Health conditions such as cancers, deformities, birth defects, premature deaths, nervous conditions and mental illnesses were reported. Genetic damage from ionising radiation, affecting many generations has also been reported. Campaigns to release MOD documents on blood tests and receive compensation have been continuing.

== 1970s ==
- Corrupt architect John Poulson and links to Conservative Home Secretary Reginald Maudling, Labour council leader T. Dan Smith and others (1972–1974): Maudling resigned, Smith sentenced to imprisonment.
- Earl Jellicoe and Lord Lambton sex scandal (1973): Conservatives, junior defence minister Lambton is arrested for using prostitutes and Cabinet minister Jellicoe also confesses.
- Labour MP John Stonehouse's faked suicide (1974)
- Harold Wilson's (Labour) Prime Minister's Resignation Honours (known satirically as the "Lavender List") gives honours to a number of wealthy businessmen. (May 1976)
- Peter Jay's appointment as British Ambassador to the US by his father in law, the Labour Prime Minister James Callaghan. At the time Jay was a journalist with little diplomatic experience. (1977)
- "Rinkagate": the Thorpe affair. Liberal Party leader Jeremy Thorpe was arrested and tried for allegedly paying a hitman to murder his lover, model Norman Scott, while walking his dog on Exmoor; the hitman only shot the dog, Rinka. Thorpe was forced to resign due to his clandestine gay affairs, but was acquitted of conspiracy to murder.
- Allegations of child sexual abuse committed by Cyril Smith (Liberal Democrat) in the 1960s.

== 1980s ==
- Joseph Kagan (Labour), earlier ennobled by the Labour Prime Minister Harold Wilson's notorious Lavender List (1976), was convicted of fraud (1980)
- Cecil Parkinson (Conservative) affair with secretary Sara Keays resulting in their child, Flora Keays (1983)
- Al-Yamamah arms deal alleged to have been obtained by bribery. Mark Thatcher, the former prime minister's son, was alleged to have been involved but denied the allegations. (1985)
- Westland affair (1986): Defence Secretary Michael Heseltine (Conservative) resigned from his Cabinet job in a disagreement with Prime Minister Margaret Thatcher over the Westland affair. Heseltine walked out of a meeting at Number 10 as his views on the future of the Westland helicopter company were being ignored at the time.
- Jeffrey Archer (Conservative) and the prostitute allegations (1986), and his subsequent conviction for perjury (2001)
- Westminster cemeteries scandal (1987)
- Edwina Currie (Conservative) resigns as a junior Health minister after claiming that millions of British eggs were infected with salmonella, stating that "most of [British] egg production" was infected (1988)
- "Homes for votes" gerrymandering scandal involving the Conservative-led Westminster City Council in London (1987–1989)

== 1990s ==
- Arms-to-Iraq affair, concerning the Conservative government endorsed sale of arms by British companies to Iraq, and the closely connected Iraqi Supergun affair (1990)
- David Mellor (Conservative) resignation after press disclosure of his affair with Antonia de Sancha and gratis holiday from a daughter of a PLO official (1992)
- Tampongate: fallout following the publication of the transcript of a 1988 phone call between Charles III (then the Prince of Wales) and his then-lover Camilla Parker Bowles (1993)
- Michael Mates' (Conservative) gift of a watch (inscribed with "Don't let the bastards grind you down") to Asil Nadir, when Mates was candidate for Police and Crime Commissioner for Hampshire and authorities were investigating Nadir for fraud (1993)
- Monklandsgate dominated the 1994 Monklands East by-election. It mainly consisted of allegations of sectarian spending discrepancies between Protestant Airdrie and Catholic Coatbridge, fuelled by the fact that all 17 of the ruling Labour group were Roman Catholics. (1994)
- Back to Basics, a Conservative government policy slogan portrayed by opponents and the press as a morality campaign to compare it with a contemporaneous succession of sex scandals in John Major's government which led to the resignation of Tim Yeo and the Earl of Caithness, among others (1994)
- Cash-for-questions affair involving Conservative MPs Neil Hamilton and Tim Smith and businessman Mohamed Al-Fayed (1994)
- Jonathan Aitken (Conservative) and the Paris Ritz Hotel bill allegations, and his subsequent conviction for perjury after his failed libel action against The Guardian, resulting in Aitken being only the third person to have to resign from the Privy Council in the 20th century. (1995)
- Conservative MP Jerry Hayes was "outed" as a homosexual by the News of the World with the headline "TORY MP 2-TIMED WIFE WITH UNDER-AGE GAY LOVER". Hayes had met Young Conservative Paul Stone at the 1991 Conservative conference and that same evening, "committed a lewd act which was in breach of the law at the time". Stone had been 18 at the time, whilst the legal age for homosexual sex in 1991 was 21. (1997)
- Bernie Ecclestone was involved in a political scandal when it transpired he had given the Labour Party a million pound donation – which raised eyebrows when the incoming Labour government changed its policy to allow Formula One to continue being sponsored by tobacco manufacturers. The Labour Party returned the donation when the scandal came to light. (1997)
- Peter Mandelson, Labour Trade and Industry Secretary, resigned after failing to disclose £373,000 loan from Paymaster General Geoffrey Robinson. (1998)
- Lobbygate: Derek Draper (political advisor to Labour) and Jon Mendelsohn (a Labour political organiser) boasted to an undercover journalist that they could sell access to politicians and create tax breaks for their clients. After this scandal the phrase "cash for access" emerged. (1998)
- Ron Davies (Labour) resigned from the cabinet after being robbed by a man he met at Clapham Common (a well-known gay cruising ground) and then lying about it (1998)

== 2000s ==
- Jeffrey Archer's (Conservative) perjury trial and imprisonment (2000)
- Officegate (2001). Henry McLeish, Labour First Minister of Scotland, failed to refund the House of Commons for income he had received from the sub-let of his constituency office in Glenrothes while still a Westminster MP.
- Keith Vaz (Labour), Peter Mandelson (Labour) and the Hinduja brothers. Mandelson was forced to resign for a second time due to misleading statements. (2001)
- Labour government special adviser Jo Moore, within an hour of the September 11 attacks, sent an email to the press office of her department suggesting: "It's now a very good day to get out anything we want to bury. Councillors' expenses?" Although prior to the catastrophic collapse of the towers, the phrase "a good day to bury bad news" (not actually used by Moore) has since been used to refer to other instances of attempting to hide one item of news behind a more publicised issue.
- Betsygate (2002), which revolved around the level of pay that Conservative MP Iain Duncan Smith's wife Elisabeth received as his diary secretary.
- In 2002, Edwina Currie (Conservative) revealed that she had had an affair, beginning in 1984, with John Major (Conservative) before he became Prime Minister of the United Kingdom. Major had frequently pushed his Back To Basics agenda (see above), which was taken by the media as a form of moral absolutism.
- Ron Davies (Labour) stood down from the Welsh assembly following accusations of illicit gay sex. Davies had claimed he had been badger-watching in the area. (2003)
- The apparent suicide of Dr. David Kelly and the Hutton Inquiry. On 17 July 2003, Kelly, an employee of the Ministry of Defence, apparently committed suicide after being misquoted by BBC journalist Andrew Gilligan as saying that Tony Blair's Labour government had knowingly "sexed up" the "September Dossier", a report into Iraq and weapons of mass destruction. The government was cleared of wrongdoing, while the BBC was strongly criticised by the subsequent inquiry, leading to the resignation of the BBC's chairman and director-general.
- In April 2004, Beverly Hughes (Labour) was forced to resign as minister for Immigration, Citizenship and Counter Terrorism when it was shown that she had been informed of procedural improprieties concerning the granting of visas to certain categories of workers from Eastern Europe. She had earlier told the House of Commons that if she had been aware of such facts she would have done something about it.
- In 2005, David McLetchie, leader of the Scottish Conservatives, was forced to resign after claiming the highest taxi expenses of any MSP. These included personal journeys, journeys related solely with his second job as a solicitor, and Conservative Party business, for example travel to Conservative conferences. Conservative backbench MSP Brian Monteith had the whip withdrawn for briefing against his leader to the Scotland on Sunday newspaper.
- Liberal Democrats Home Affairs spokesman Mark Oaten resigned after it was revealed by the News of the World that he paid rentboys to perform sexual acts on him.
- David Mills financial allegations (2006). Tessa Jowell, Labour cabinet minister, was embroiled in a scandal about a property remortgage allegedly arranged to enable her husband, David Mills, to realise £350,000 from an off-shore hedge fund, money he allegedly received as a gift following testimony he had provided for Silvio Berlusconi in the 1990s. Nicknamed by the press as "Jowellgate".
- Cash for Honours (2006). In March 2006 it emerged that the Labour Party had borrowed millions of pounds in 2005 to help fund their general election campaign. While not illegal, on 15 March the Treasurer of the party, Jack Dromey, stated publicly that he had neither knowledge of nor involvement in these loans and had only become aware when he read about it in the newspapers. A story was running at the time that Dr Chai Patel and others had been recommended for life peerages after lending the Labour party money. He called on the Electoral Commission to investigate the issue of political parties taking out loans from non-commercial sources.
- News of the World royal phone hacking scandal (2006). This scandal involved the secret intercepting of voicemails from the royal family by private investigators hired by the tabloid News of the World.
- Angus MacNeil (2007). The married SNP MP who made the initial police complaint over the cash for honours scandal was forced to make an apology after it was revealed that in 2005 he had a "heavy petting" session with two teenage girls aged 17 and 18 in a hotel room at the same time his wife was pregnant with their third child.
- In November 2007, it emerged that more than £400,000 had been accepted by the Labour Party from one person through a series of third parties, causing the Electoral Commission to seek an explanation. Peter Watt resigned as the General Secretary of the party the day after the story broke and was quoted as saying that he knew about the arrangement but had not appreciated that he had failed to comply with the reporting requirements.
- On 24 January 2008, Peter Hain (Labour) resigned his two cabinet posts (Secretary of State for Work and Pensions and Secretary of State for Wales) after the Electoral Commission referred donations to his Deputy Leadership campaign to the police.
- Derek Conway (2008): The Conservative Party MP was found to have reclaimed salaries he had paid to his two sons who had in fact not carried out the work to the extent claimed. He was ordered to repay £16,918, suspended from the House of Commons for 10 days and removed from the party whip.
- Cash for influence (2009): Details of covertly recorded discussions with four Labour Party peers which covered their ability to influence legislation and the consultancy fees that they charged (including retainer payments of up to £120,000) were published by The Sunday Times.
- United Kingdom parliamentary expenses scandal (2009): Widespread actual and alleged misuse of the permitted allowances and expenses claimed by Members of Parliament and attempts by MPs and peers to exempt themselves from Freedom of Information legislation.

== 2010s ==
=== 2010 ===
- The Iris Robinson scandal in which First Minister of Northern Ireland Peter Robinson (Democratic Unionist Party) stepped aside for six weeks in January 2010 following revelations of his wife's involvement in an extramarital affair, her attempted suicide, and allegations that he had failed to properly declare details of loans she had procured for her lover to develop a business venture.
- Red Sky scandal, involving contracts given to company Red Sky by the Northern Ireland Housing Executive.
- The 2010 cash for influence scandal, in which undercover reporters for the Dispatches television series posed as political lobbyists offering to pay Members of Parliament to influence policy.
- In May 2010, Sarah, Duchess of York offered an undercover reporter posing as a businessman access to her husband, Prince Andrew (then Special Representative for International Trade and Investment), for £500,000.
- On 29 May 2010 Chief Secretary to the Treasury David Laws (Liberal Democrat) resigned from the Cabinet and was referred to the Parliamentary Commissioner for Standards after The Daily Telegraph newspaper published details of Laws claiming around £40,000 in expenses on a second home owned by a secret partner between 2004 and 2009, whilst House of Commons rules have prevented MPs from claiming second home expenses on properties owned by a partner since 2006. By resigning Laws became the shortest serving Minister in modern British political history with less than 18 days' service as a Cabinet Minister.

=== 2011 ===
- On 14 October 2011 Secretary of State for Defence Liam Fox resigned from the Cabinet after he "mistakenly allowed the distinction between [his] personal interest and [his] government activities to become blurred" over his friendship with Adam Werritty. (He again served as a cabinet minister under Theresa May.)
- The Ed Balls document leak was exposed by The Daily Telegraph and showed that shadow chancellor Ed Balls was involved in a supposed plot known as 'Project Volvo' to oust Tony Blair as leader and replace him with Gordon Brown shortly after the 2005 election.

=== 2012 ===
- In February 2012, Liberal Democrat MP Chris Huhne resigned from the Cabinet when he was charged with perverting the course of justice over a 2003 speeding case. His wife Vicky Pryce had claimed that she was driving the car, and accepted the licence penalty points on his behalf so that he could avoid being banned from driving. Huhne pleaded guilty at his trial, resigned as a member of parliament, and he and Pryce were sentenced to eight months in prison for perverting the course of justice.
- In March 2012, Conservative Party co-treasurer Peter Cruddas resigned after it was revealed he had offered exclusive access to prime minister David Cameron and chancellor George Osborne in exchange for yearly payments of £250,000. These offers, pronounced by Cruddas and Conservative lobbyist Sarah Southern, were secretly recorded by Sunday Times undercover reporters posing as potential donors.
- In October 2012, Andrew Mitchell resigned from his post as Chief Whip following allegations made about his conduct during an altercation with police at Downing Street on 19 September, the incident becoming known as "plebgate".

=== 2013 ===
- In the 2013 Labour Party Falkirk candidate selection, which began following the announcement that the incumbent MP Eric Joyce was to step down at the 2015 general election, allegations were made on the significant infiltration of the selection process by the Unite trade union, the Labour Party's largest financial backer.

=== 2014 ===
- In March, Mark Menzies resigned as parliamentary private secretary to International Development Minister Alan Duncan following an investigation by the Sunday Mirror. The investigation claimed Menzies had hired a male sex worker and asked him to supply mephedrone, a drug banned in Britain in 2010.
- In April 2014 Maria Miller, the Culture Secretary, resigned following pressure relating to the results of an investigation into her past expenses claims.
- On 20 November 2014 Emily Thornberry resigned her shadow cabinet position shortly after polls closed in the Rochester and Strood by-election. Earlier in the day, she had received criticism after tweeting a photograph of a house in the constituency adorned with three flags of St. George and the owner's white van parked outside on the driveway, under the caption "Image from #Rochester", provoking accusations of snobbery. She was criticised by fellow Labour Party MPs, including leader Ed Miliband who said her tweet conveyed a "sense of disrespect".
- Namagate, involving allegations that First Minister of Northern Ireland Peter Robinson may have financially benefitted from a deal with National Asset Management Agency (NAMA).

=== 2015 ===
- In February 2015, Jack Straw told undercover reporters that he operated "under the radar" and had used his influence to change EU rules on behalf of a firm which paid him £60,000 a year. Malcolm Rifkind was also implicated in the cash for access scandal.
- In September 2015, Lord Ashcroft published a biography of David Cameron, which suggested that the then Prime Minister took drugs regularly and performed an "outrageous initiation ceremony" which involved inserting "a private part of his anatomy" into the mouth of a dead pig during his time in university. This became known as "piggate". The Independent reported that Cameron had told friends the claim was "utter nonsense". The biography also led to questions about the Prime Minister's honesty with party donors' known tax statuses as Lord Ashcroft suggested he had openly discussed his non-domiciled status with him in 2009, earlier than previously thought.

=== 2017 ===
- In 2017 the contaminated blood scandal, in which many haemophiliacs died from infected Factor medicine, hit the headlines and Parliament with allegations of an "industrial scale" criminal cover-up. MP Ken Clarke retracted remarks from his autobiography relating to the scandal and a public inquiry was initiated.
- The Renewable Heat Incentive scandal in Northern Ireland, in which Arlene Foster set up a green energy scheme but failed to introduce cost controls, creating perverse incentives which eventually led to a £480m bill to the Northern Ireland budget. There were allegations that members of the Democratic Unionist Party attempted to postpone the closure of the scheme, which gave way to a spike in applications and causing the public purse millions of pounds. In January 2017, the scandal caused the resignation of the deputy First Minister, Martin McGuinness, after Foster refused to stand aside as First Minister pending an investigation, collapsing the Executive Office and triggering an early election of the Northern Ireland Assembly. The resulting political rifts meant the Assembly did not meet again until 2020.

=== 2018 ===
- The 2018 Windrush scandal, involving members of the Windrush generation being wrongly detained, deported, or threatened with deportation which caused the resignation of the then Home Secretary, Amber Rudd.

== 2020s ==
=== 2020 ===
- The Dominic Cummings scandal, where Dominic Cummings, chief strategist of prime minister Boris Johnson, broke COVID-19 pandemic restrictions during the UK's first nationwide lockdown while experiencing symptoms of the disease. Cummings and Johnson rejected calls for the former to resign. It was suggested that the scandal undermined the public's compliance with pandemic restrictions.
- The Alex Salmond scandal concerned how the Scottish Government, led by incumbent first minister of Scotland Nicola Sturgeon, breached its own guidelines in its investigation into the harassment claims against Sturgeon's predecessor as first minister, Alex Salmond. The Scottish Government lost a judicial review into their actions and had to pay over £500,000 to Salmond for legal expenses. Salmond claimed that senior figures in Sturgeon's government and the ruling Scottish National Party (SNP) conspired against him for political reasons. Critics accused Sturgeon of breaking the ministerial code which resulted in calls for her resignation. Sturgeon disputed the allegations, arguing that while mistakes had been made, her government acted appropriately.

=== 2021 ===
- The Greensill scandal, in which former prime minister David Cameron approached a number of government ministers on behalf of Greensill Capital to lobby for the company to receive Covid Corporate Financing Facility loans.
- The Sun published pictures and then video of leaked CCTV footage from inside the Department of Health of health secretary Matt Hancock and Gina Coladangelo kissing in a breach of COVID-19 social distancing guidance. Boris Johnson accepted Matt Hancock's apology and stated that he "considers the matter closed", but Hancock resigned as health secretary the following day.
- In November 2021, the Parliamentary Commissioner for Standards found that Conservative MP Owen Paterson had broken paid advocacy rules, but instead of approving his suspension, the government enforced a three-line whip on Conservative MPs to pass a motion that the investigation was "clearly flawed". After an outcry from opposition parties, the government made a U-turn and Paterson resigned.
- Partygate, involving social gatherings by Downing Street and Conservative Party staff during COVID-19 restrictions in late 2020.
- Beergate, concerning allegations that an event in Durham on 30 April 2021, attended by Labour Party leader Keir Starmer and Deputy Leader Angela Rayner, could have been in breach of COVID-19 lockdown restrictions.

=== 2022 ===
- Neil Parish, Conservative MP for Tiverton and Honiton, resigned in April after it was discovered that he had watched pornography in the House of Commons on at least two occasions.
- Chris Pincher scandal: The deputy chief whip of the Conservative Party, Chris Pincher, resigned on 30 June following allegations about him groping two men. Further allegations of harassment emerged against Pincher, along with claims that prime minister Boris Johnson had already been informed of his behaviour. The incremental effect of this and other recent controversies led to the resignation of 59 Conservative politicians, including Rishi Sunak as chancellor and Sajid Javid as health secretary. This in turn led to Boris Johnson committing to resign as leader of the Conservative Party, and thus as prime minister when his replacement as leader had been chosen by his party.

=== 2023 ===
- In April 2023, Scott Benton had the Conservative whip removed after suggesting to undercover reporters that he would break parliamentary lobbying rules for money. The parliament Standards Committee found he had committed a "very serious breach" of the rules.
- Operation Branchform: A Police Scotland investigation into possible fundraising fraud in the Scottish National Party begun in 2021 came to a head in 2023 with the arrests of SNP Chief Executive Peter Murrell, Party Treasurer Colin Beattie, and former Party Leader and First Minister of Scotland Nicola Sturgeon over a three-month period. Both Peter Murrell and Colin Beattie resigned their party roles immediately after their arrests. The highly publicised arrests and perceived delays in bringing the investigation (which continued for nearly two more years) to a conclusion led both the SNP's supporters and its opponents to claim that the investigation had been politicised. Murrell was ultimately charged with embezzlement in 2024 and appeared in court for the first time in March 2025.
- Michael Matheson iPad scandal: Scottish Health Secretary Michael Matheson incurred nearly £11,000 in roaming charges after taking a Scottish Parliamentary iPad on a family holiday to Morocco. When this was publicised, Matheson initially attempted to claim the charges as a parliamentary expense, but later admitted that the iPad had been used by his sons to stream football matches and agreed to personally pay back the full cost of the data roaming bill. Following an investigation by the Scottish Parliament Corporate Body, Matheson resigned as Health Secretary in February 2024. Matheson was subsequently banned from Holyrood for 27 days and had his salary withdrawn for 54 days, the heaviest sanction ever given to an MSP.

=== 2024 ===
- Sir Jeffrey Donaldson, the leader of the Democratic Unionist Party, was accused of rape and other sexual offences against two victims dating back to 1985. He resigned with immediate effect and was suspended from the party.
- In March 2024, The Guardian reported that Frank Hester, the largest ever donor to the Conservative Party, had made comments in a 2019 company meeting about the MP Diane Abbott. The paper reported that he said that looking at Abbott makes you "want to hate all black women" and that she "should be shot", as well as making comments about a female executive from another organisation, saying "it would be much better if she died", and about his own Asian female employees, saying "we take the piss out of the fact that all our Chinese girls sit together in Asian corner". The Labour Party said the Conservatives should return the money to Hester. Rishi Sunak, then-prime minister, said Hester's comments were racist but that the money would not be returned. The Conservatives received another £5m donation from Hester later in the year which, despite further calls for it to be returned, the Conservative Party kept.
- In April, MP William Wragg resigned from the Public Accounts and 1922 committees and the Conservative Party after admitting to The Times he'd been blackmailed into giving a scammer phone numbers of MPs, political aides and a journalist. The scammer held naked photos of the MP after honey trapping him on the gay dating app Grindr.
- Mark Menzies had the Conservative whip removed in April while investigations were underway into allegations the MP had misused campaign donations. The funds were alleged to have been used to pay for his medical treatment and to people he claimed had locked him in a London flat. According to the BBC, some of the money had been used to pay sex workers.
- Election betting scandal: Following the scheduling of the 2024 general election for 4 July, it was discovered that Craig Williams, Parliamentary Private Secretary to Prime Minister Rishi Sunak, had placed a £100 bet on the election being in July. Further investigation uncovered multiple similar bets made by Conservative Party members and MPs, including cabinet minister Alister Jack, as well as police officers on Sunak's protection detail. The Gambling Commission ultimately charged Williams and fourteen other people with criminal offences under the Gambling Act 2005.
- 2024 Labour Party freebies controversy
- In November, the BBC revealed that Labour chancellor Rachel Reeves's CV and public statements about her past jobs contained inaccurate information, such as saying she'd worked at the Bank of England for a decade when it had actually been six, including a year of study at London School of Economics; and that she'd worked as an economist at Halifax Bank of Scotland when she'd worked in the customer relations department dealing with complaints and mortgage retention.
- In November, Louise Haigh resigned as Secretary of State for Transport after it emerged she had pleaded guilty to fraud by false representation in 2014 after falsely reporting in 2013 to police that her work phone had been stolen.
- In December, Bangladesh's Anti-Corruption Commission named Tulip Siddiq, the City Minister and Economic Secretary to the Treasury, in an investigation alleging embezzlement of up to £3,900,000,000 from infrastructure projects. She resigned her ministerial position on 14 January 2025, maintaining her innocence but acknowledging that the ongoing situation could distract from the government's work. Prime Minister Keir Starmer accepted her resignation, noting that no evidence of financial misconduct had been found. The UK Anti-Corruption Coalition had called for Siddiq to relinquish her economic crime responsibilities due to a potential conflict of interest, given her family ties to the deposed regime in Bangladesh.

=== 2025 ===
- Tulip Siddiq, City Minister and Economic Secretary to the Treasury, was implicated in corruption investigations into her aunt, the deposed Prime Minister of Bangladesh Sheikh Hasina. Siddiq was accused of helping her aunt to embezzle £3.9 billion during the construction of a nuclear power plant in 2013. She ultimately resigned on 14 January.
- In February, Labour health minister Andrew Gwynne was suspended from his party for ageist, racist, misogynistic and antisemitic comments he'd made in a WhatsApp group or reposted on social media. Oliver Ryan was also suspended for comments in the same WhatsApp group, although he had the whip reinstated later that year.
- In April, Labour Mayor of the West of England (WECA) and MP for North East Somerset Dan Norris was arrested on suspicion of rape, child sex offences, child abduction and misconduct in a public office. He was suspended from the Labour party and banned from the Parliamentary Estate and the WECA headquarters in Bristol.
- In August, the government's Under-Secretary of State for Homelessness Rushanara Ali resigned after reports that she had evicted tenants from a property she was renting out before re-listing the house for rent at a higher price, a practice which Ali was at the time attempting to ban with the Renters' Rights Bill. Ali was also accused of violating existing tenancy law by charging the tenants for cleaning and repainting costs.
- Angela Rayner tax scandal: a controversy emerged when it was revealed in August that Deputy Prime Minister Angela Rayner had underpaid stamp duty by £40,000 on an £800,000 flat in Hove purchased earlier in the year. Rayner resigned from government and as Deputy Leader of the Labour Party.
- Nathan Gill, a former MEP and regional leader of Reform UK in Wales, was discovered to have taken bribes from people connected to the Russian government to advance a pro-Russia agenda in the European Parliament.
- Peter Mandelson's connections with sex offender Jeffrey Epstein and his sharing of confidential information. It led to Mandelson's dismissal as the British Ambassador to the United States and his resignation from the Labour Party and from the House of Lords. After Mandelson was dismissed, it emerged that he had failed necessary security checks but the result was ignored by Foreign Office officials. Civil servant Olly Robbins was sacked for his role in Mandelson's appointment, and Downing Street chief of staff Morgan McSweeney resigned his post in February 2026.

=== 2026 ===
- Operation Cannon: Cabinet Office minister Josh Simons (Labour) resigned after being implicated in efforts to discredit journalists who reported on Labour Together's breaching of campaign finance laws.
- Reform UK financial allegations: Leader of Reform UK, Nigel Farage, was investigated by the National Crime Agency and Parliamentary Commissioner for Standards for financial dealings including an undeclared £5 million donation from cryptocurrency billionaire Christopher Harborne.
