= News grid =

Timetable for mass media public relations

A news grid or media grid is a strategy used in public relations for the content and timing of communications to a mass media audience.

The term is mostly associated with political communications, but grids can be used by any organisation.

== Government communications ==
News grids are also used by governments in a similar way. As well as "good" news stories, "bad" news stories may also be released tactically with the aim of minimising unfavourable coverage. In the UK, Jo Moore became notorious for attempting to "bury bad news".

== Elections ==
News grids are often used in election campaigns. Typically a party or candidate will wish to communicate several policy ideas to the electorate during the campaign, which may last for several weeks or months. The grid therefore separates out the timing of announcements, press conferences or photo opportunities so that each policy receives distinct attention and public awareness.
