= 2010 cash for influence scandal =

UK political scandal

The 2010 cash for influence scandal was a political scandal in the United Kingdom. It was brought to public and widespread media attention by a March 2010 documentary by Dispatches in which a journalistic sting operation recorded and revealed Members of Parliament and Lords offering to work for a fictitious political lobbying firm for fees of £3,000 to £5,000 per day.

As a result of the scandal, Labour MPs Patricia Hewitt, Geoff Hoon, Margaret Moran and Stephen Byers were all suspended from the party. Hoon, Byers and Richard Caborn later also received bans from Parliament.

== Background ==
Twenty politicians were approached by the documentary: fifteen agreed to meet, ten arranged meetings, and of those ten, nine were secretly filmed. These nine included the Conservative MP Sir John Butterfill and Labour Party MPs Stephen Byers, Patricia Hewitt, Geoff Hoon, Richard Caborn, Adam Ingram and Margaret Moran. The Labour members were all due to stand down at the next general election and all but Moran had been ministers, and many had served in the cabinet. Byers had been Transport Secretary (resigned 29 May 2002); Hoon Defence and then Transport Secretary (resigned 5 June 2009); Hewitt Health Secretary (resigned 27 June 2007); Caborn Minister for Sport (Resigned 28 June 2007) and Ingram was Minister of State for the Armed Forces (Resigned 29 June 2007). In 2009 after criticism surrounding her expense claims the Labour Party had barred Moran from standing again.

Conservative MP Julie Kirkbride was one of the politicians approached by the fake agency established by the programme, but declined to assist them. It was reported that an unnamed Conservative MP did agree to work for the fake agency.

The bogus firm was named Anderson Perry, after the Marxist historian Perry Anderson.

== Sting interviews ==
Members of Parliament were invited to an interview by an undercover reporter claiming to be the director of a company hoping to influence policy. They were met and secretly recorded. The story was broken by The Sunday Times Insight team and followed up with the Dispatches documentary. Amongst the controversial comments made to the reporter were Geoff Hoon saying he wanted to make "some real money," Margaret Moran boasting she could call on a "girls' gang" of female ministers to help the fictitious company, and Stephen Byers describing himself as "sort of like a cab for hire."

=== Byers' interview ===
Byers made claims of having influenced government policy in the past for money. He claimed to have spoken with Peter Mandelson and Lord Adonis in the past to influence outcomes for National Express and Tesco. Lord Adonis admitted having private discussions with Byers about it but denied that he had "come to any arrangement", and Mandelson said he remembered no such discussion or meeting. Byers later withdrew his name for consideration by the fictitious lobbying company via email, claiming he had over-stated his role and wrote "I have not spoken to Andrew Adonis or Peter Mandelson about the matters I mentioned." When the story broke, National Express and Tesco also denied there was any truth in Byers' statements.

=== Butterfill's Interview ===
Conservative MP Sir John Butterfill was also implicated and offered to lobby to benefit the fictitious company and use his political connections for a payment of £35000 a year. Butterfill was also seen on the programme saying that it was likely that he would be made a peer and go to the House of Lords, the following day the leader of the Conservative Party, David Cameron said, "I can tell you that is not going to happen."

=== Hoon's Interview ===
Geoff Hoon was interviewed shortly after a trip to Washington where he had undertaken

Three days of Nato work then a couple of days of Hoon work.

In the interview he went on to state that

One of the challenges I think I am really looking forward to is sort of translating my knowledge and contacts about sort of international scene into something that bluntly makes money

and further argued that

There will be opportunities for American companies in particular to look around at some (em) vulnerable European companies because those companies will become vulnerable as their own governments cut back on defence spending. I foresee, its one reason why I'm talking to American private equity firms, I foresee a period where we may well see American companies in effect, buying market share in Europe because they will be buying up national champions who are not getting the support they need to, to continue.

== Political response ==
Foreign Secretary David Miliband said he was "appalled" and Chancellor Alistair Darling said it was "ridiculous". Norman Baker, of the Liberal Democrats, will be referring the matter to the Parliamentary Commissioner for Standards. The leader of the Opposition, David Cameron, described the matter as "shocking" and called for an inquiry. Stephen Byers referred himself to the parliamentary commissioner for standards.

On 22 March 2010 it was announced that Patricia Hewitt, Geoff Hoon, Margaret Moran and Stephen Byers had been suspended from the Parliamentary Labour Party. Geoff Hoon told the BBC that Gordon Brown had told him he would no longer be performing unpaid work with NATO on behalf of the government. Meanwhile, David Cameron launched a call for a full inquiry.

On 9 December 2010, Geoff Hoon along with Stephen Byers and Richard Caborn were banned from parliament, the Standards and Privileges Committee banned Geoff Hoon for a minimum five years as his was the most serious breach, whilst Byers received two years and Caborn six months.

== Media response ==
The media was especially critical of Stephen Byers, who claimed to have lobbied for money in the past.

== See also ==
- Cash for access
- Cash for influence
- Influence peddling
