= 1852 United Kingdom general election =

- 7–31 July 1852

All 654 seats in the House of Commons 328 seats needed for a majority
- Turnout: 743,904
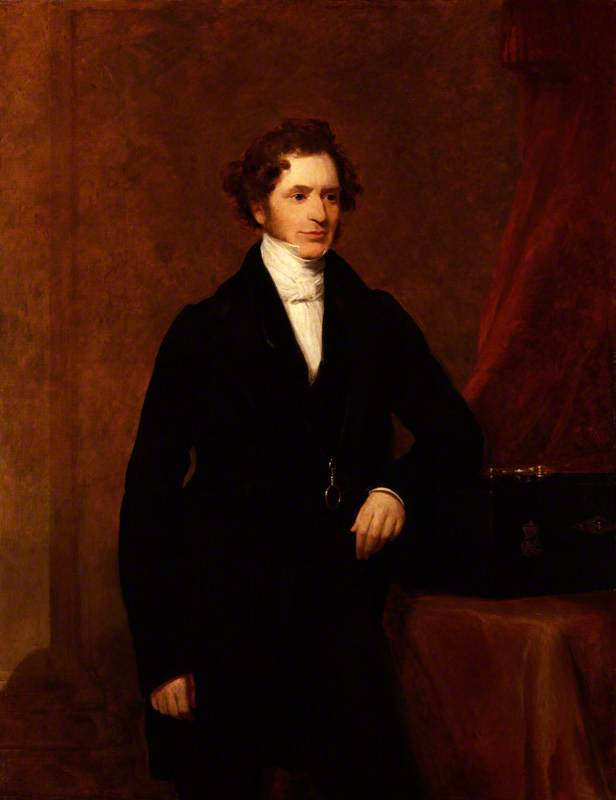

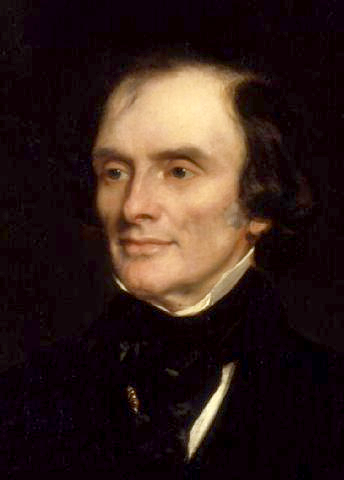
	First party	Second party
Leader	Earl of Derby	Lord John Russell
Party	Conservative	Whig
Leader since	July 1846	October 1842
Leader's seat	House of Lords	City of London
Last election	325 seats, 42.7%	292 seats, 53.8%
Seats won	330	324 (Note: The seat and vote count figures for the Whigs given here include the Speaker of the House of Commons)
Seat change	▲5	▲32
Popular vote	311,481	430,882
Percentage	41.9% (Note: Several country and university seats held by Conservatives were uncontested, and many urban multi-member constituencies that tended to vote Liberal had multiple candidates, so this is a misleading figure. Therefore, national swing is not applicable to elections in this era.)	57.9%
Swing	▼0.8 pp	▲4.1 pp
- Colours denote the winning party—as shown in § Results

- Composition of the House of Commons after the election
Prime Minister before election
Earl of Derby
Conservative
Prime Minister after election
Earl of Derby
Conservative

The 1852 United Kingdom general election was held from 7 to 31 July 1852. It produced a closely contested result between the Conservatives and Whigs, marking a significant shift in British politics, with the Conservatives increasingly representing the rural aristocracy and the Whigs the urban bourgeoisie.

As in the previous election of 1847, Lord John Russell's Whigs won the popular vote, but the Conservative Party won a very slight majority of the seats. However, a split between Protectionist Tories, led by the Earl of Derby, and the Peelites who supported Lord Aberdeen made the formation of a majority government very difficult. Lord Derby's minority, protectionist government ruled from 23 February until 17 December 1852. Derby appointed Benjamin Disraeli as Chancellor of the Exchequer in this minority government. However, in December 1852, Derby's government collapsed because of issues arising out of the budget introduced by Disraeli. A Peelite–Whig-Radical coalition government was then formed under Lord Aberdeen. Although the immediate issue involved in this vote of "no confidence" which caused the downfall of the Derby minority government was the budget, the real underlying issue was the repeal of the Corn Laws which Parliament had passed in June 1846 and had split the Conservative Party. In this election, there were 18 Peelites elected in England and Wales. The constituency of St Albans, with its two members, was disfranchised due to corruption. This accounts for the fact that there were two fewer seats in the House of Commons as compared to the previous election, though no redistribution took place.

== Corn Laws ==
A group within the Tory/Conservative Party called the "Peelites" voted with the Whigs to achieve the repeal of the Corn Laws. The Peelites were so named because they were followers of Prime Minister Robert Peel. In June 1846, when Peel was the Prime Minister of a Tory government, he led a group of Tory/Conservatives to vote with the minority Whigs against a majority of his own party.

"Corn" was important to the cost of living of the average person in Britain during the early 19th century. The term "corn" did not refer to maize, as it did in the United States. In Britain, "corn" refers to wheat, rye and/or other grains. Wheat, or corn, was used in the baking of bread and was the "staff of life". Thus the price of wheat was a very substantial part of the cost of living. The Corn Laws enforced a very high "protective" tariff against the importation of wheat into England. These high tariffs raised the cost of living and increased the suffering of poor people in England. Agitation for the repeal of the Corn Laws had begun in England as early as 1837, and bills for their repeal had been introduced in Parliament each year from 1837 until their actual repeal in 1847.

== Split in the Tory party ==
For some parliamentary leaders, like John Bright, Richard Cobden and Charles Pelham Villiers, the repeal of tariffs on imported corn was not enough. They wished to reduce the tariffs on all imported consumer products. These parliamentary leaders became known as "free traders". The repeal of the Corn Laws irrevocably split the Tory/Conservative party. The Peelites were not free traders, but both the Peelites and the free traders were originally Tories. Thus both the free traders and the Peelites tended to side with the Whigs against the Tories on international trade issues. This presented a real threat to any government the Tories attempted to form. The effect of this split was felt in the election of July–August 1847, when the Whig party won a 53.8% majority of seats in Parliament. The Whigs knew that they could count on the Peelite Conservatives when an international trade issue came before Parliament. In June 1852, the effects of the split in the Tory/Conservative party was having even more effect. The period after about 1847 was one of economic stagnation in Britain.

== Political parties ==
The split in the Tory party was a significant cause of the reformation of the political parties in Britain in the February 1852 election.

As noted above, in the election of 1852 the protectionist rump of the Conservatives became the party of the rural landholders, while the Liberals and Peelites became the party of the towns, boroughs and growing urban industrial areas of Britain.

In 1852, England elected 244 Conservatives and 216 non-Conservatives; Wales elected 20 Conservatives and 12 non-Conservatives, Scotland elected 20 Conservatives and 33 non-Conservatives, Ireland elected 40 Conservatives and 63 non-Conservatives whereas the Universities elected 6 Conservatives.

== Fall of the government in December 1852 ==
The election of 1852 returned a majority in support of free-trade, but the minority Conservative government continued in office. An opportunity for the opposition arose in December 1852, when the Chancellor of the Exchequer, Benjamin Disraeli, introduced the budget of the Derby minority government. Due to the worsening economic situation, the budget imposed a number of tax increases on the profits of the middle class and granted some tax cuts for the rural landed aristocracy. The budget also extended the income tax to the Irish middle class, angering some of the members from Ireland who had supported the minority government on the Irish Church issue and were opposed to the previous Prime Minister, the Liberal leader Lord John Russell. Consequently, a number of Irish Conservatives voted against the minority government on the Disraeli budget on 17 December 1852. This vote of "no confidence" caused the government to fall.

Following the fall of the minority government, Lord Aberdeen was called on to form a government, since the Irish Conservatives who opposed Disraeli's budget were opposed to Lord John Russell on religious issues and he formed a Peelite/Whig coalition government on 19 December 1852. This government served until 30 January 1855, when it too collapsed due to issues surrounding British involvement in the Crimean War.

== Results ==

UK general election 1852
Party	Candidates						Votes		
Party	Stood	Elected	Gained	Unseated	Net	% of total	%	No.	Net %
Conservative	461	330			+5	50.46	41.87	311,481	−0.5
Whig	488	324			+32	49.54	57.92	430,882	+4.1
Chartist	4	0	0	1	−1	0	0.21	1,541	+0.1

While the Conservatives had, in theory, a slim majority over the Whigs, the party was divided between Protectionist and Peelite wings: the former numbered about 290 and the latter 35–40. The Whigs themselves represented a coalition of old Whigs (conservative Protestant/dissenter aristocrats), Liberals, Radicals, and Irish nationalists. The above numbers therefore do not represent the true balance of support in Parliament.

=== Voting summary ===
Popular vote
Whig and allies	57.92%
Conservative	41.87%
Chartist	0.21%

=== Seats summary ===
Parliamentary seats
Whig and allies	49.54%
Conservative	50.46%

=== Regional results ===
==== Great Britain ====
Party	Seats	Seats change	Votes	%	% change
Conservative & Liberal Conservatives	290	+5			
Whig	261	-7			
Total	551	Same position			

===== England =====
Party	Seats	Seats change	Votes	%	% change
Conservative & Liberal Conservatives	244	+5			
Whig	216	-7			
Total	460	Same position			

===== Scotland =====
Party	Seats	Seats change	Votes	%	% change
Whig	33	=			
Conservative & Liberal Conservatives	20	=			
Total	53	Same position			

===== Wales =====
Party	Seats	Seats change	Votes	%	% change
Conservative & Liberal Conservatives	20				
Whig	12				
Total	32	Same position			

==== Ireland ====
Party	Seats	Seats change	Votes	%	% change
Irish Conservative & Liberal Conservatives	40				
Whig & Repealers	63				
Total	103				

==== Universities ====
Party	Seats	Seats change	Votes	%	% change
Conservative & Liberal Conservatives	6	Same position			
Whig	0	Same position			
Total	6	Same position			

== See also ==
- List of MPs elected in the 1852 United Kingdom general election
