= 7 and 8 Balfour Place =

Buildings in Mayfair, London, England

Coordinates: 51°30′33″N 0°09′09″W

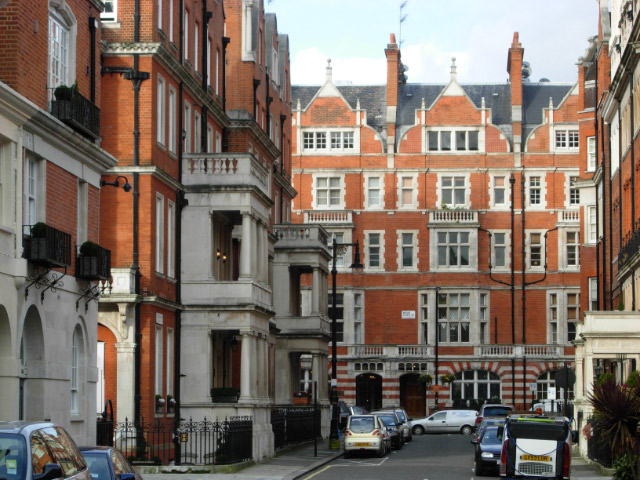
Balfour Place, Mayfair, in 2008 (no 7 is the corner building at the left)

7 and 8 Balfour Place are a pair of Grade II listed houses in Balfour Place, Mayfair, London W1, on the corner with Mount Street. No 7 is also known as Balfour House.

7 and 8 Balfour Place were Grade II listed in 1984. They were built in 1892–1894 by Eustace Balfour and Hugh Thackeray Turner of Balfour and Turner, in a "Free Style with Flemish and early Renaissance details", or in an Arts and Crafts style. The house's first owner was George Coventry, 9th Earl of Coventry. Balfour Place was originally known as Portugal Street (honouring the Portuguese wife of King Charles II), until the Grosvenor family renamed it after their chief surveyor.

== 7 Balfour Place ==
In 1978, the heiress Christina Onassis, who owned a three-bedroom flat in nearby Reeves Mews, flew in to London for a one-day shopping tour, amid considerable press interest. She viewed the house, but was apparently put off by the de Grimston co-founders of The Process Church of The Final Judgment, living in the street, and the press calling their property "Satan's Cave".

In 1991, the house was converted into six flats.

In 2014, it was listed for sale at £45 million, with seven reception rooms, 19 bedrooms, six kitchens and 17 bathrooms".

In 2016, British billionaire banker Peter Cruddas and his wife Fiona paid £42 million in cash for the seven-storey mansion, formerly owned by the Iranian-born art dealer Nasser Khalili, who lived there for 22 years.
