= 2009 cash for influence scandal =

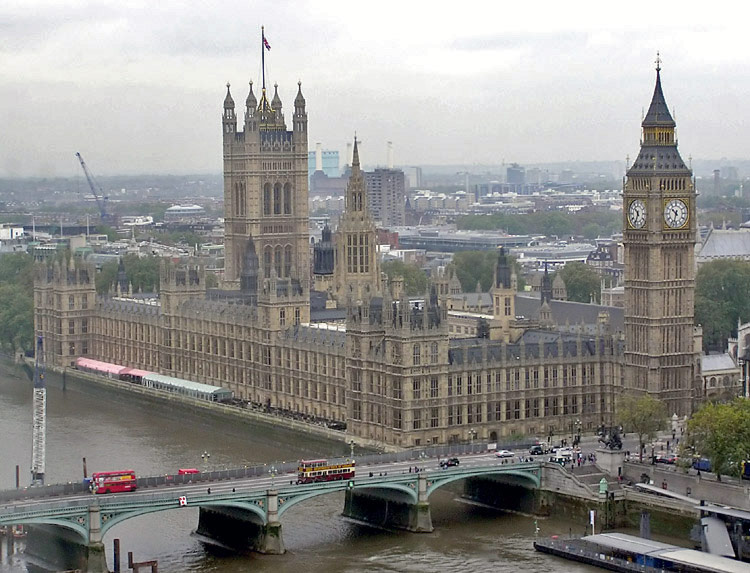
The Palace of Westminster

The 2009 cash for influence scandal (also cash for amendments or cash for laws) was a political scandal in the United Kingdom in 2009 concerning four Labour Party Life peers offering to help make amendments to legislation for up to £120,000. The Lords Privileges Committee recommended the two men be suspended from the House for up to six months after an investigation into allegations made against four Labour peers. Lord Taylor of Blackburn was suspended as a Labour Party member pending the investigation while Lord Truscott quit the party. On 20 May, the House of Lords considered the report of the Privileges Committee and voted to suspend Lord Taylor and Lord Truscott for six months.

The suspensions were the first since Oliver Cromwell’s era in the 1640s. The previous member to be suspended from the House of Lords is believed to have been Thomas Savile, who was barred in 1642 for siding with King Charles I.

== Allegations ==
The allegations were made by The Sunday Times Insight team in an article published on Sunday, 25 January 2009. In a series of covert interviews, the four peers stated that they could use their political influence to amend legislation. The individuals concerned were Lord Snape, Lord Moonie, Lord Taylor of Blackburn and Lord Truscott. Six other peers either declined to help or did not respond to the undercover reporters' approach.

The newspaper claimed its reporters approached the four peers masquerading as lobbyists acting for an unnamed company. The firm, they said, wanted to set up a chain of shops in the UK and were seeking exemption from current laws on business rates.

A recording was later released of Lord Taylor saying firms paid him up to £100,000 a year. Lord Taylor tells an undercover reporter: "Some companies that I work with would pay me £100,000 a year." When the reporter questions it, he adds: "That's cheap for what I do for them. And other companies would pay me £25,000."

On 30 January, The Sunday Times released further material via their website containing audio and video purporting to show Lord Truscott describing how the passage of legislation in both the House of Commons and House of Lords could be influenced and what part he could play in successfully facilitating amendments on behalf of paying clients.

Two of the fundamental principles set out in the Code of Conduct for the House of Lords are that members "must never accept any financial inducement as an incentive or reward for exercising parliamentary influence" and "must not vote on any bill or motion, or ask any question in the House or a committee, or promote any matter, in return for payment or any other material benefit (the "no paid advocacy" rule)."

== Reaction ==
Following publication of The Sunday Times article, the Labour Party immediately promised an urgent investigation. The Leader in the House of Lords, Lady Royall said she had spoken to the four Labour peers concerned and would be "pursuing the matter with utmost vigour". She also said House of Lords members must "abide by its high standards."

In a statement to the House of Lords on 26 January Lady Royall called the claims "deeply shocking". She pointed out that they were only allegations at this stage but said the claims had been "damaging not just to this House but to Parliament and politics". She said the matter had been referred to the Lords Interests sub committee (a sub committee of the Committee for Privileges), which had already met and investigations were underway. She said she believed "tougher sanctions" were needed to deal with peers who broke the rules and she had written to the chairman of the Committee on Standards and Privileges to ask him to review the matter.

On 26 January, two of the four peers made statements in The House of Lords. Lord Snape told The House "As one of the people involved in this incident may I first of all apologise for bringing this House, if I have done so, into disrepute. But may I say that these are allegations in a Sunday newspaper and may I appeal to noble lords in all parts of the House to allow me the opportunity to refute these allegations before your lordships house and elsewhere."

Lord Taylor stated "If I have done anything that has brought this House into disrepute I most humbly apologise. I feel within my own conscience I followed the rules and the directions that have been given in this House over the 31 years I have been a member."

Lord Truscott told the BBC he did admit to having had "discussions" with a reporter, but said that "to suggest I would offer to put down amendments for money is a lie."

Lord Moonie acknowledged discussing a fee of £30,000 but said he had not done anything "outside the rules".

The Conservative Party leader in the Lords, Lord Strathclyde, said the allegations represented a "shocking and depressing moment" for the House of Lords. "This House has been mired in a grim torrent of criticism about a culture of sleaze," he told peers. "If these allegations are true those involved have shamed this House," he said, adding there were no "grey areas in the paid advocacy rules".

Prime Minister Gordon Brown said: "It's important that we don't pre-judge these investigations but these are serious allegations and we are determined to get to the bottom of these allegations, and whatever action needs to be taken will be taken."

The Liberal Democrats wrote to Metropolitan Police commissioner Sir Paul Stephenson asking for an investigation to take place.

SNP MP Angus MacNeil, whose complaint started the "cash for honours" called for the four peers to be suspended, while an investigation is carried out.

== Findings of House of Lords Committees ==
The House of Lords Sub-committee on Lords' Interests was asked to report on the matter. It found that Lord Moonie had not expressed a willingness to breach the code, but that Lord Snape, Lord Truscott and Lord Taylor had all done so. Truscott and Taylor were additionally found to have failed to act on their personal honour.

The Lords' Privileges Committee considered the sub-committee's report and heard further evidence from Lord Snape. It published its findings on 14 May 2009. It found that Lord Moonie and Lord Snape had not breached the code, but that Lord Truscott and Lord Taylor had done, and recommended that they be suspended.

== Police investigations ==
On 29 January 2009 it was confirmed that Police were looking at the allegations following the complaint by the Liberal Democrats. On 11 February 2009 the Metropolitan Police confirmed that no action would be taken, noting that "The application of the criminal law to members of the House of Lords in the circumstances that have arisen here is far from clear," and that "In addition, there are very clear difficulties in gathering and adducing evidence in these circumstances in the context of parliamentary privilege."

== See also ==
- Reform of the House of Lords
- Cash-for-questions affair
- Cash for Honours
- Influence peddling
- Political parties
- Revolving door
