= Trudeau cash-for-access scandal =

Canadian political scandal

In 2016, a political scandal emerged after newspapers reported that Justin Trudeau, the then-prime minister of Canada, had been attending cash-for-access events at the homes of wealthy Chinese-Canadians in Toronto and Vancouver. Attendees at these events, including attendees with connections to the Chinese Communist Party (CCP), would pay up to $1,525 per ticket to meet Trudeau. In response, the Liberal Party of Canada indicated that all party fundraising complied with Elections Canada rules and regulations.

Although such cash-for-access events were reported as appearing to violate Trudeau's "Open and Accountable Government" rules about lobbying and fundraising, Ethics Commissioner Mary Dawson interviewed Trudeau and determined that no rules were broken, without releasing a report. Dawson's office defended the lack of a report by stating that Dawson had not opened a formal investigation, which would have legally required the commissioner to issue a public report under the Conflict of Interest Act.

== Known cash-for-access events ==
Before or around 2016, Trudeau attended several fundraisers at the Toronto home of an insurance mogul. One of the fundraisers occurred on 14 April 2016. The insurance mogul is reported to associate with China's consul general to Toronto.

On 19 May 2016, Trudeau attended a fundraiser at the Toronto home of a chair of the Chinese Business Chamber of Commerce, along with 32 other guests. This event was attended by Chinese billionaire and CCP official Zhang Bin, who subsequently made a $200,000 donation to the Pierre Elliott Trudeau Foundation and a $50,000 donation to erect a statue of Pierre Trudeau in Montreal, after his initial request of a statue of Pierre Trudeau with Mao Zedong was declined. In addition to Bin, two other event attendees have reported known close ties to Chinese state organizations. The mogul's canola oil export business interests might have been harmed by China's planned restrictions on the import of Canadian canola seed. In September of the same year, Trudeau persuaded China's leaders to lift the restrictions.

On 7 November 2016, Trudeau attended a "cash-for-access" fundraiser with over 80 guests at the West Vancouver mansion of a British Columbia real estate developer, who was also part of a 2012 campaign by the Canadian Alliance of Chinese Associations to rally overseas support for Chinese territorial expansion in the East China Sea. At the event, the developer reportedly urged Trudeau to allow a Chinese investment in Canadian seniors’ care that was under review by the federal government. Later that same month, Chinese insurance firm Anbang Insurance Group completed its purchase of a majority stake in Vancouver-based seniors’ care company Retirement Concepts for over $1 billion. Retirement Concepts was the largest provider of assisted living and residential care services in British Columbia at the time, receiving $86.5-million from the province in the 2016 fiscal year. Neither the Prime Minister's Office nor the Liberal Party website noted the event. Photos of the event appeared in Chinese news media.

== See also ==
- Cash for access
- Chinese government interference in Canada
- Chinese government interference in the 2019 and 2021 Canadian federal elections
