= CMC Markets =

British financial services company

CMC Markets plc
- Type: Public
- Traded as: LSE: CMCX; FTSE 250 component
- Industry: Financial services, Forex trading, CFDs, Spread betting, share dealing
- Founded: 1989; 37 years ago
- Founder: Peter Cruddas
- Headquarters: London, United Kingdom
- Area served: Worldwide
- Key people: Paul Wainscott (chairman); Peter Cruddas (CEO)
- Services: Online trading, CFDs and spread betting
- Revenue: ▲£376.8 million (2026)
- Operating income: ▲£103.4 million (2026)
- Net income: ▲£73.7 million (2026)
- Total assets: ▲£1,006.9 million (2026)
- Total equity: ▲£457.2 million (2026)
- Owner: Peter Cruddas (over 59%)
- Subsidiaries: StrikeX (51%)
- Website: www.cmcmarkets.com

CMC Markets plc is a UK-based financial services company that offers online trading in shares, spread betting, contracts for difference (CFDs), and foreign exchange across global markets. The company is headquartered in London, with hubs in Sydney and Singapore. It is listed on the London Stock Exchange and is a constituent of the FTSE 250 Index.

== History ==
=== 1989–2001: Early years ===
The company was founded in 1989 by Peter Cruddas as a foreign exchange market maker under the name Currency Management Corporation. The firm later adopted the CMC name and was rebranded as CMC Markets in 2005. According to The Financial Times, Cruddas started the company with £10,000 in initial capital.

In 1996, CMC Markets launched a real-time FX trading platform, claiming to have conducted the first-ever online FX trade. Its proprietary MarketMaker software became central to the company's early internet-based trading business.

Between 1996 and 2000, the company's subsidiary, Information Internet Limited, licensed the MarketMaker software to several banks. In 2000, Cruddas consolidated ownership of the subsidiary and integrated it into CMC Markets as its internal IT division, giving CMC exclusive use of its technology.

In 2000, CMC Markets introduced contracts for difference (CFDs) and, by 2001, launched online spread betting on financial markets. These additions expanded the company's offering to include derivative products. In the same year, Peter Cruddas announced his retirement.

=== 2002–2007: Global expansion ===
In 2002, CMC Markets began its global expansion, opening offices in multiple countries and growing its spread betting operations in the UK alongside its international CFD business. The first overseas office was opened in Sydney, Australia, led by Goran Drapac and David Trew. The first North American office was opened in 2003 in New York, headed by Josh Levy. This was followed in 2005 by the acquisition of the Canadian broker Shorcan Index, which was integrated as the company's Toronto office under the leadership of Simon Grayson.

From 2001 to 2005, CMC Markets also operated under the brand name deal4free.com to promote its zero-commission trading services, primarily targeting UK-based spread betting clients. However, commissions were later reinstated, and the brand was retired as part of a company-wide rebranding in September 2005.

In 2006, CMC Markets planned to go public through an initial public offering (IPO), but the effort was abandoned at the last minute, with the company citing unfavorable market conditions.

In 2007, the company purchased Digital Look, a financial media and technology company that operated the financial information site Digitallook.com and provided data to third parties. The acquisition was integrated into CMC's London operations, although Digital Look continued offering services to external clients. That same year, CMC acquired the Australian stockbroker Andrew West. The acquisition was merged into its Australian operations under the new name CMC Markets StockBroking, which continued to provide physical share broking services in Australia.

Later in 2007, Goldman Sachs acquired a 10% stake in CMC Markets for £140 million, valuing the company at £1.4 billion.

=== 2008–2013: Financial crisis and restructuring ===
During the Great Recession of 2008–2009, CMC Markets experienced a significant decline in profits. In response, Peter Cruddas changed the management team, closed seven offices, and reduced the company's headcount from a peak of 1,100 employees.

In 2010, the company introduced its Next Generation trading platform to the UK market. The new software offered improvements over the previous MarketMaker platform, including the ability to quote market prices to additional decimal points and execute trades without re-quotes.

By 2011, CMC Markets had reduced its operations to 17 offices across four continents and a workforce of over 700 employees. That same year, the company sold its Digital Look business unit to the Spanish-based Web Financial Group.

In January 2013, following a period of declining performance, Peter Cruddas returned as chief executive, replacing Doug Richards. For the financial year ended 31 March 2013, the company reported a 21% fall in revenue and a pre-tax loss of £2.8 million, and reduced its workforce by about one-third.

=== 2014–2020: IPO and market challenges ===
After returning to profitability in 2014, speculation began about a potential IPO for CMC Markets.

In July 2015, CMC Markets started to offer binary options, including a proprietary product branded as Countdown, designed for short-term trading.

On 5 February 2016, CMC Markets was listed on the main market of the London Stock Exchange at an initial price of 240p per share, valuing the company at £691 million. This was significantly below the £1 billion valuation that Peter Cruddas had reportedly anticipated when considering an IPO back in 2014. By this time, CMC had over 44,000 active clients and had processed more than 34 million trades. Later that year, on 25 April, the company launched a range of binary trading products tailored for mobile, tablet, and desktop platforms.

Shortly after its stock market debut, CMC Markets' valuation fell by half after the Financial Conduct Authority (FCA) introduced new measures targeting the spread betting market. Amid this downturn, the company reportedly considered relocating its headquarters and over 300 jobs to Germany, where it was already the largest provider of CFD products. Peter Cruddas was reportedly involved in discussions with BaFin, Germany's financial regulator, about the possible move.

On 2 June 2016, CMC Markets was included in the FTSE 250 Index. On 15 November 2016, CMC Markets was awarded "Best CFD Broker" at the Finance Magnates London Summit.

In February 2017, the Norwegian Central Bank, Norges Bank, acquired a 3% stake in the company.

In November 2018, CMC Markets reported a 76% fall in first-half pre-tax profit. In April 2019, CFO and COO Grant Foley announced his departure as the company's shares hit a record low following a profit warning.

In 2019, CMC Markets opened an office in the UAE and announced plans to strengthen its presence in the Middle East.

=== 2021–present ===
In 2022, CMC Markets became the official sponsor of the St Kilda Football Club for a three-season partnership. In September, the company launched CMC Invest, an investment app offering share dealing in UK and US stocks, ETFs, and investment trusts.

In January 2023, CMC obtained an in-principle license to operate in Singapore. Later that year, the company integrated Skale's tools such as a customizable back office, CRM, a multi-layered IB portal, and a traders' area, into its trading platform. A partnership with TrueLayer introduced a closed-loop payments product. On 9 June 2023, CMC acquired a 33% stake in StrikeX, a UK-based blockchain technology firm. This partnership facilitated the development of TradeStrike, a centralized exchange for tokenized assets.

These initiatives coincided with a difficult financial period. In 2023, CMC Markets' annual report revealed a 43% drop in net profits, a 20% decline in operating revenue, and a 9% reduction in active traders. In August, CMC lowered its annual profit outlook as subdued trading activity weighed on revenue, sending its shares down about 20%. In November, the Australian Securities and Investments Commission (ASIC) identified CMC as one of seven CFD issuers that had self-reported issuing products above permitted leverage limits and had undertaken remediation programmes to compensate affected clients.

For the first half of its 2024 financial year, CMC reported a pre-tax loss of £2 million. In February 2024, it announced about 200 job cuts, or 17% of its global workforce. Later that year, average revenue per client rose to £4,685, while total segregated client money declined by £31.8 million. The company also returned to profitability, which Finance Magnates attributed partly to the cost-cutting measures.

In March 2025, CMC opened a new office in Bermuda after receiving regulatory approval to conduct investment and digital-asset business. In April, it integrated the TradingView charting platform, allowing clients to execute trades directly via TradingView. In May 2025, CMC Markets acquired a controlling 51% stake in StrikeX (up from its previous 33% holding), giving it a majority interest in the blockchain firm.

In June 2025, CMC Markets' shares fell nearly 18% after the company reported adjusted pre-tax profit of £84.5 million for the year ended 31 March 2025, below a company-compiled analyst consensus of £90.6 million. The company said the miss reflected higher-than-expected costs, including a one-time £4.3 million charge related to customer remediation in Australia following an industry-wide regulatory review into margin netting. CMC also said deputy CEO David Fineberg would move into a newly created role as global head of strategic partnerships, and named senior independent director Paul Wainscott as its new non-executive chairman.

In June 2026, CMC reported £101.3 million in pre-tax profit for the year ended 31 March, below the company-compiled £106.7 million consensus, and forecast £460–480 million in net operating income for FY2027.

== Operations ==
CMC Markets and several subdivisions offer trading on forex, indices, commodities, shares, and treasuries, as well as cash equities products for institutional clients. By 2023, the company had more than 300,000 clients worldwide. As of 2024, 56% of CMC Markets' net revenue comes outside of the UK and Europe, mostly from Singapore and Dubai.

== Controversy and lawsuits ==
=== Cash-for-access case ===
In March 2012, The Sunday Times reported that CMC Markets founder Peter Cruddas, then a co-treasurer of the Conservative Party, had offered access to senior ministers in return for large party donations. Undercover reporters recorded Cruddas saying that a £250,000 donation could secure invitations to private dinners with prime minister David Cameron and chancellor George Osborne. Cruddas resigned from his party position.

Cruddas won £180,000 in libel damages from The Sunday Times in 2013. In 2015, an appeal court reduced the damages to £50,000, ruling that the publication's core claims about "cash for access" were substantially supported by evidence.

In December 2020, Peter Cruddas was given a peerage, a controversial move by Boris Johnson who ignored the Lords Appointments Commission's recommendation not to ennoble Cruddas in light of the 2012 cash-for-access episode.

=== Australia class action ===
CMC Markets Asia Pacific Pty Ltd is the defendant in a representative proceeding (Edin Zulic & Anor v CMC Markets Asia Pacific Pty Ltd, NSD410/2022) in the Federal Court of Australia. The class action, filed by Johnson Winter Slattery and funded by Harbour Fund V, L.P., concerns the alleged marketing and sale of highly leveraged CFDs and binary options to retail investors between 7 November 2011 and 30 April 2021.

In May 2025, Lawyerly reported that the applicants had obtained data showing that about 2,500 clients who failed screening tests for high-risk products had nevertheless been allowed to trade. In February 2026, after reviewing 27,000 documents produced by the trading platform, the court allowed the applicants to add claims concerning alleged personal advice.

=== CMC Spreadbet Plc vs Robert Tchenguiz ===
In July 2022, CMC Spreadbet Plc initiated legal proceedings against businessman Robert Tchenguiz, seeking repayment of a £1.31 million debt related to spread betting. In response, Tchenguiz filed a counterclaim, accusing CMC of breaching its contract by prematurely closing his positions. However, the dispute was resolved in court in CMC's favor, with a July 2022 ruling ordering Tchenguiz to pay the debt.

=== 2024 lawsuit by Juan Vargas ===
In 2024, former senior employee Juan Vargas filed an unfair dismissal claim against CMC Markets, alleging that changes to a bonus scheme deprived him of nearly $1 million over a two-and-a-half-year period and that Matthew Lewis, head of CMC Asia Pacific, threatened him after he complained. CMC and Lewis denied the allegations, which had not been tested in court at the time of reporting.

== See also ==
- List of electronic trading platforms
