= Putin's Progress =

Book by Peter Truscott, Baron Truscott

- Author: Peter Truscott
- Language: English
- Genre: Biography
- Published: January 3, 2004 Simon & Schuster
- Publication place: United States
- Media type: Print (Hardback)
- Pages: 370
- ISBN: 0-7432-4005-7
- OCLC: 53821136
- Dewey Decimal: 947.086/092 B 22
- LC Class: DK510.766.P87 T78 2004

Putin's Progress is a biography written by Peter Truscott about Russian president Vladimir Putin's rise to power. The book was published in January 2004 by New York-based publishers Simon & Schuster. The book deals mainly with Putin's childhood, education, involvement with the KGB/FSB, rise to power, and the first few years of his presidency.
