= Pablo Zalba =

Spanish economist and politician (born 1975)

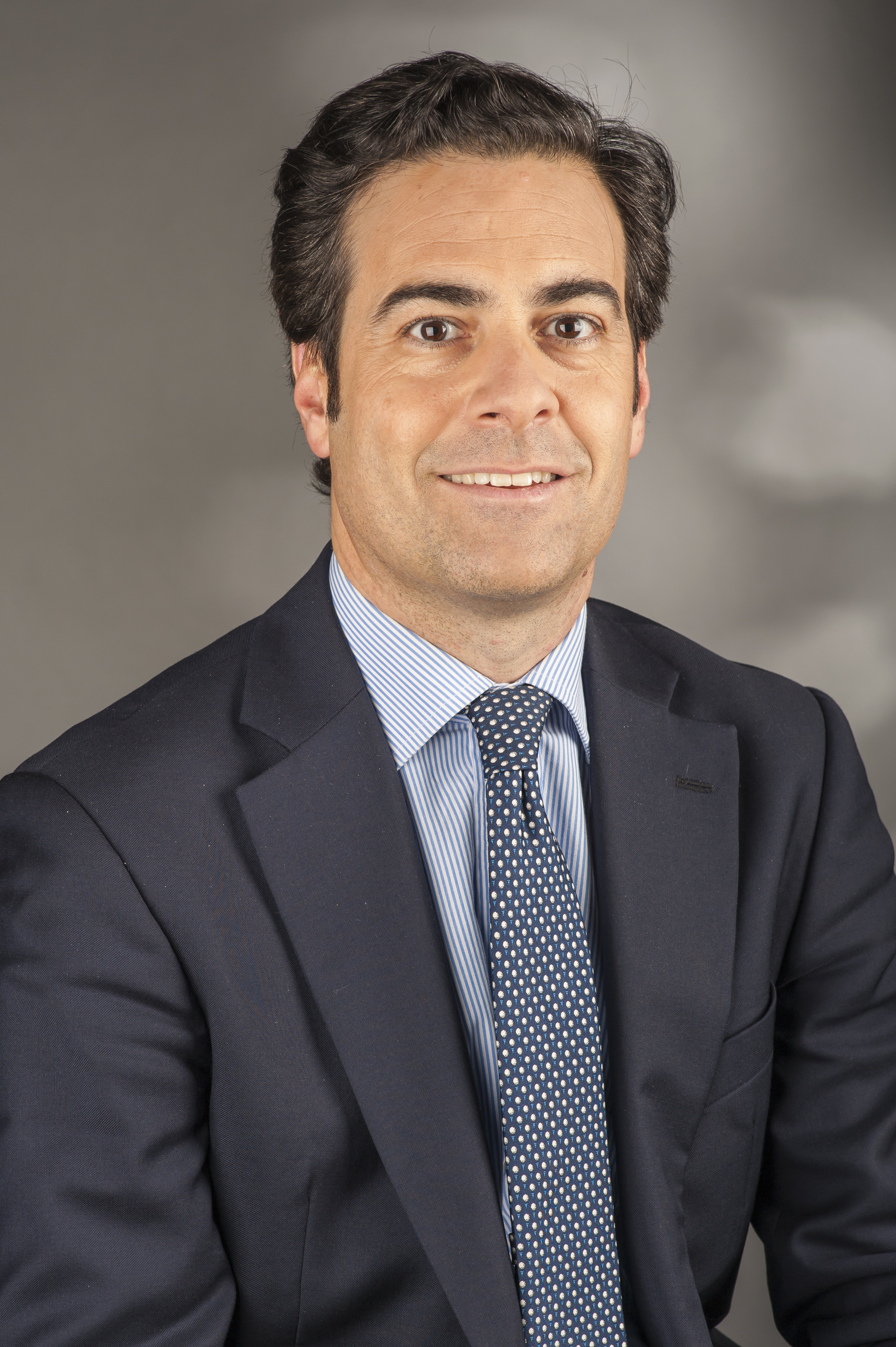
- Zalba in 2014

President of the Official Credit Institute
- Incumbent
- Assumed office 19 November 2016
- Preceded by: Emma Navarro Aguilera

Personal details
- Born: 28 January 1975 (age 51) Pamplona, Spain
- Occupation: politician

Pablo Zalba Bidegain (born 28 January 1975) is a Spanish economist and politician who has been a Member of the European Parliament (MEP), for the European People's Party, in office June 2009 to November 2016. From 2016 to 2018 he served as President of the Official Credit Institute (ICO).

== Early life ==
Zalba was born on 28 January 1975, in Pamplona. In 1997, he graduated in Business Administration and Management from the University of Navarre. In 2007, he obtained an Executive MBA from London Business School.

== Career ==
In 1998, Zalba began working at ArcelorMittal, both at its headquarters in Madrid and Pamplona, where he was active as head of International Business Development in the Construction Unit. From 2005 to 2009, he worked in Sic Lazaro in Pamplona as a Sales and Business Developer.

== Political career ==
In 2008, Zalba participated in the reconstitution of the Navarre Popular Party as a member of its executive committee. He has been president of the Navarre Popular Party since 29 July 2014.

Zalba was elected a Member of the European Parliament for the party in June 2009. In that term, he was Vice-President of the Economic and Monetary Affairs Committee of the European Parliament and a member of the Delegation for relations with the People's Republic of China. He was also Vice-President of the Youth and Friends of Free Cuba Intergroups.

Zalba was implicated in the 2011 cash for influence scandal together with fellow MEPs Adrian Severin, Ernst Strasser and Zoran Thaler. He was the only one of the four accused MEPs who denied any wrongdoing.

Zalba had a very important role in the approval of the Free Trade Agreement (FTA) between the European Union and South Korea. He introduced safeguard measures to protect Europe's most sensitive sectors. The agreement came into force on 1 July 2011. Zalba was also the promoter of the Chamber of Commerce Korea-Spain with former Minister Josep Piqué.

On 24 January 2012, Zalba was named Vice-President of the Economic and Monetary Affairs Committee of the European Parliament, replacing José Manuel García-Margallo.

On 25 September 2012, Zalba was awarded the 2012 MEP Awards (MEP of the Year) in the category of Commerce for his work on the FTA EU-Korea. Parliament Magazine together with PlasticsEurope, an industry association, presents these awards each year to MEPs who have excelled in different areas of legislation.

In November 2012, Zalba headed the delegation of the European Parliament in the Parliamentary Conference of the World Trade Organization (WTO) in Geneva.

In 2012, Zalba was one of the main promoters in the European Parliament of the EU-Central America association agreement as rapporteur for the International Trade Committee.

=== Second term ===
On 25 May 2014, Zalba was re-elected as a Member of the European Parliament for 2014 to 2019. He is the EPP Vicecoordinator of the Economic and Monetary Affairs Committee and a substitute member of the International Trade Committee.

Zalba is Vice-President of the steering committee of the Parliamentary Conference on the World Trade Organization in the European Parliament, coordinator of the EPP Group Young Members Network. and Vice-President of SME Europe.

Zalba is also a member of the advisory board of the European Young Innovation Forum, a European nonprofit association that promotes entrepreneurship and innovation in society, especially among young people

Zalba is a member of the following Delegations of the European Parliament: Mercosur, People's Republic of China, Chile, Central America and the Euro-Latin American Parliamentary Assembly. He is also member of the following Intergroups of the European Parliament: Family, Child Rights, Development help, Youth, Sport, Automotive, SME (small and medium-sized enterprises), Minority Languages and Wine.

Zalba has signed the European Dementia Pledge which recognises the challenges faced by people with dementia and their carers, especially in the current context of demographic challenges, fragile sustainability of healthcare systems and the lack of treatment for such diseases. He has also joined the European Alzheimer’s Alliance and support the national association.

In March 2015, Zalba won the MEP Awards in the category of Economic and Monetary Affairs after being rapporteur for the Multilateral Interchange Fees Regulation as well as the European Central Bank report which is elaborated annually by the Economic and Monetary Affairs Committee of the European Parliament

== Publications ==
- "Reflexiones europeas a mitad de camino. Una visión sobre Europa". Preface by José Manuel García-Margallo, Spain's Minister of Foreign Affairs and Cooperation. The book was presented in Pamplona in 2014.
- "Retos y logros en las relaciones de la UE con América Latina", Pablo Zalba and Julián Conthe, 2013

== Seminars and symposiums ==
- "Economic shock absorbers for the Eurozone. Deeping the debate on automatic stabilizers", European Commission and Bertelsmann Stiftung. June 2014, Brussels
- "Iberian Conference on Europe Recovery and economic perspectives". June 2014, Madrid
- "Spain on the road to recovery?", London School of Economics (LSE). March 2014, London

== Polemic ==
In 2011, Zalba was caught in a trap created by a British newspaper The Sunday Times. He was urged by a lobby group to rewrite a European Law for 100.000 € per year as an adviser. The lobby was false, created by the newspaper to probe how European Law is amended by these lobby groups.

After an investigation, the European Anti-Fraud Office OLAF declared Pablo Zalba had acted properly and had rejected the money.
