= Cash for influence =

Cash for influence, otherwise known as Influence peddling, is the exchange of money for influence with politicians. Along with the phrases Cash for laws and Cash for amendments, it might refer to specific historical examples of political corruption:

- 2009 cash for influence scandal, United Kingdom
- 2010 cash for influence scandal, United Kingdom
- 2011 cash for influence scandal, European Parliament
- Qatar corruption scandal at the European Parliament

== See also ==
- Cash for access
- Cash-for-Honours scandal
- Cash-for-questions affair
- Influence peddling
