= Peter Truscott, Baron Truscott =

British consultant, politician and life peer (born 1959)

The Right Honourable The Lord Truscott
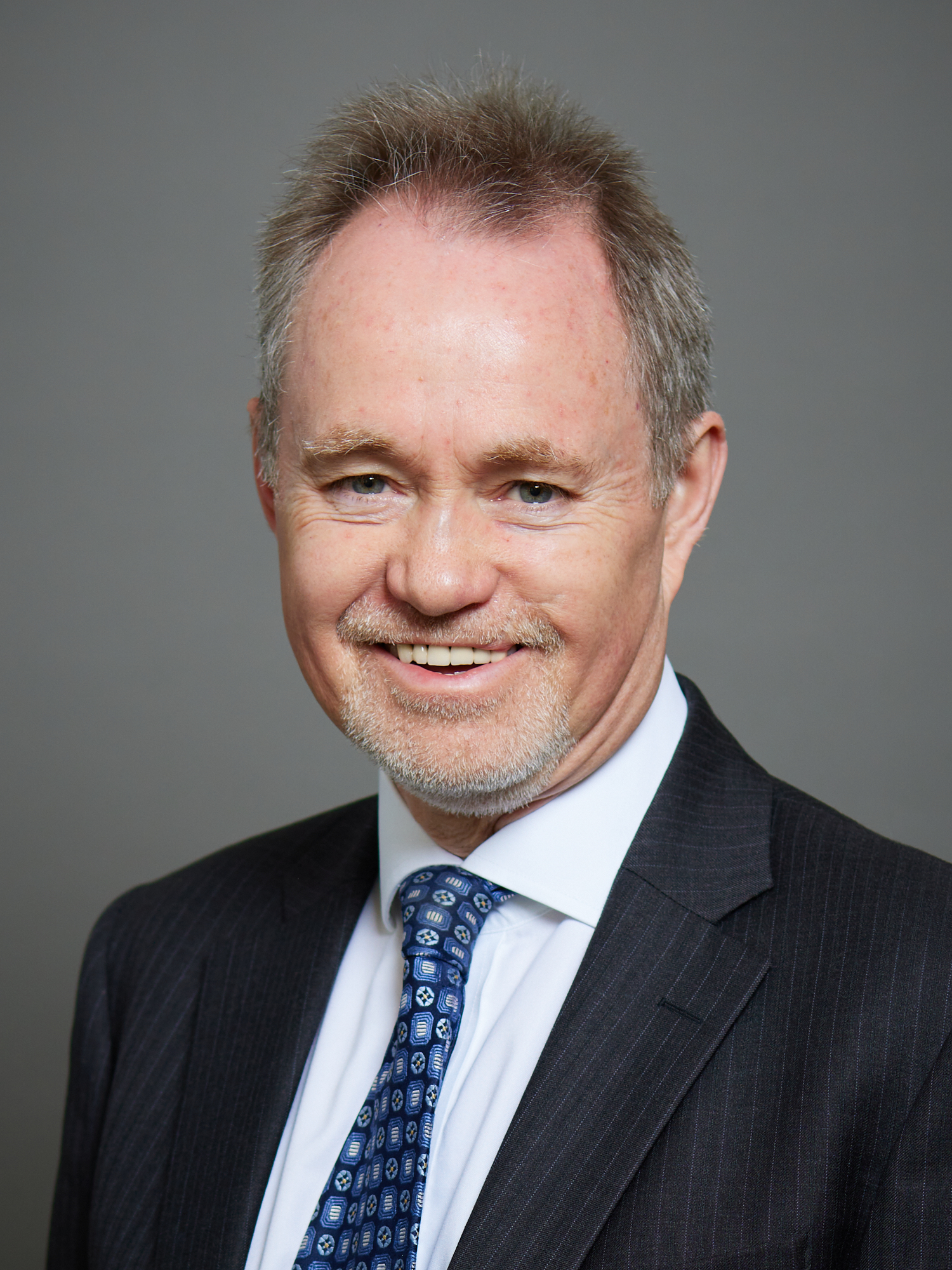
- Official portrait, 2022

Lord-in-Waiting Government Whip
- In office 28 June 2007 – 17 October 2007
- Prime Minister: Gordon Brown
- Preceded by: The Lord Evans of Temple Guiting
- Succeeded by: The Lord Bach

Parliamentary Under-Secretary of State for Energy
- In office 10 November 2006 – 28 June 2007
- Prime Minister: Tony Blair
- Preceded by: Malcolm Wicks
- Succeeded by: Malcolm Wicks

Member of the House of Lords
- Lord Temporal
- Life peerage 10 June 2004

Member of the European Parliament for Hertfordshire
- In office 9 June 1994 – 10 June 1999
- Preceded by: Derek Prag
- Succeeded by: Constituency abolished

Personal details
- Born: Peter Derek Truscott; 20 March 1959 (age 67) Newton Abbot, Devon, England
- Party: Non-affiliated
- Other political affiliations: Labour (until 2009)
- Education: University of Oxford

Peter Derek Truscott, Baron Truscott (born 20 March 1959) is a British petroleum and mining consultant, independent member of the House of Lords and writer. He was a Labour Member of the European Parliament (MEP) from 1994 to 1999 and was elevated to the peerage in 2004. He has written on Russia, defence and energy, and works with a variety of companies in the field of non-renewable resource extraction.

Previously somewhat low-profile in British politics, Truscott made headlines in 2009 as one of four Labour peers named by the Sunday Times as being willing to accept money to help companies amend bills that would have an adverse effect on them. He consequently became one of the first peers suspended from the House of Lords since the 17th century.

== Personal life ==
Truscott was born in Newton Abbot, Devon, and educated at the local grammar school. He studied modern history at Exeter College, Oxford, receiving a BA in 1981 followed by a DPhil in 1985. In 1991, he met and rapidly married Svetlana Chernikov, daughter of a Red Army colonel. By 2008, the couple owned a £1 million apartment in Mayfair, a flat in Bath and property in Russia.

In February 2009, it was revealed that Truscott was, in line with House of Lords rules, classifying his small Bath flat as his main residence, thus entitling him to claim a £28,000 per year public subsidy of his £700,000 Mayfair flat.

== Political career ==
=== Political organiser and MEP ===
After completion of his doctorate, Truscott was a political organiser for the Labour Party from 1986 to 1989, and a councillor in Colchester from 1988 to 1992. He contested Torbay for the Labour Party in 1992, coming third with 5,503 votes (9.59%). He then went on to represent Hertfordshire in the European Parliament from 1994 to 1999. He was a member of the Foreign Affairs Committee, the Security Sub-Committee, and the delegation for relations with the Russian Federation throughout his time in the European Parliament, and was also the UK Government's spokesperson on foreign affairs and defence in the Parliament from 1997 to 1999.

=== Peerage ===
Having failed to win re-election to the European Parliament, Truscott was created a life peer on 10 June 2004 as Baron Truscott, of St. James's in the City of Westminster. From 2006 to 2007 he was Parliamentary Under-Secretary of State for Energy at the Department of Trade and Industry (DTI) and the DTI government spokesperson in the House of Lords. Truscott is currently Parliamentary British Council Ambassador to the Russian Federation and republics of the former Soviet Union. He is a member of the House of Lords European Union Select Committee, Sub Committee C (Foreign Affairs, Defence and Development Policy). He was formerly a visiting research fellow with the Institute for Public Policy Research and an associate fellow of the Royal United Services Institute for Defence and Security Studies.

In 2007 Truscott made a speech to a coal industry conference in his capacity as a DTI minister restating the government's strong support for the continued use of coal in electricity generation, a controversial policy opposed by scientists and campaigners such as climatologist James E. Hansen. While in the House of Lords, Truscott was judged by the Public Whip to have voted "very strongly against" efforts to strengthen the Climate Change Act 2008, opposing all of the following: the target of an 80% reduction in emissions by 2050, the aim to prevent warming of more than 2 °C (the figure most commonly cited in discussions about avoiding runaway climate change), making the UK's annual statement on emissions the responsibility of the Prime Minister, and reporting on the international impact of the UK's emissions. He has also voted "strongly for" the Identity Cards Act 2006.

In 2016 he came out in favour of Britain leaving the European Union.

In 2022 he attracted considerable negative press due to his support for Vladimir Putin, especially after asking a question in the House of Lords that seemingly expressed puzzlement as to why a thermonuclear war with Russia would be considered an 'unwelcome outcome'.

== Involvement with energy and mining firms ==
Truscott became a consultant and non-executive director working mainly with non-renewable resource extraction and public affairs companies throughout Europe and Russia. He developed a client list including Eastern Petroleum Corporation, controlled by the controversial Frank Timiş and another Timiş outfit: African Minerals, Gavin Anderson and Company, Opus Executive Partners, Gulf Keystone Petroleum Ltd, African Minerals Ltd, Landis & Gyr and his own consultancy firm, Energy Enterprises Ltd. Together with his wife, he bought 1,000,000 shares in Gulf Keystone Petroleum, which they bought in September 2008 at 20.75p per share, selling half of these in April 2010 for 85.22 pence per share. He additionally owns shares above the £50,000 registration minimum in African Minerals Ltd.

== Corruption allegations ==
In January 2009 Truscott was the subject of corruption allegations in the Sunday Times, along with three of his Labour colleagues. He was accused of seeking a £72,000 fee to help two people posing as lobbyists "amend a government bill that was harmful to their client", saying he would have to "be a 'bit careful' and could not table the amendment himself." He also claimed to have "done similar work before" on a recent piece of energy legislation, and met officials from the Department for Business, Enterprise and Regulatory Reform shortly before the Government changed its policy in a manner favourable to his client, Landis & Gyr. His response to the BBC was: "to suggest I would offer to put down amendments for money is a lie". It was subsequently alleged that he had lobbied UK energy Minister Malcolm Wicks without declaring his financial interests.

Following the publication of the allegations, and video and audio tape of Truscott talking to under-cover Sunday Times reporters, he was forced to resign a consultancy for Landis & Gyr and was suspended from his consultancy for Gavin Anderson and Company. He resigned his directorship of African Minerals in August 2009, retaining a remunerated role as a strategic consultant. Both Opus Executive Partners and Gulf Keystone decided not to suspend or remove Truscott despite considerable pressure from the media to do so, both citing valuable contribution and integrity in his involvement with them.

The Lords Privileges Committee subsequently recommended (on 14 May) that Lord Truscott be suspended from the House. The investigation into the allegations concluded Lord Truscott had broken rules on exercising parliamentary influence in return for money by agreeing to "smooth the way" for lobbyists, make introductions to other peers and ministers and to lobby officials. In a BBC interview on 14 May, Lord Truscott stated that "I apologise for being entrapped and for using loose language". On 20 May the House of Lords considered the Privileges Committee report and voted to suspend Lord Truscott and Lord Taylor of Blackburn for six months, the first such action since the 17th century.

In May 2009, it was alleged that the small flat in Bath that Lord Truscott calls his main residence was unoccupied and looked deserted. Classifying this flat as his main residence had entitled him to claim an annual £28,000 per year public subsidy of his £700,000 Mayfair flat, amounting to £125,000 over four years.

He resigned from the Labour Party in May 2009, and now sits as a non-affiliated member of the House of Lords.

== Bibliography ==
- Russia First: Breaking with the West (1997)
- European Defence (2000) (published by the Institute for Public Policy Research)
- Kursk: Russia's Lost Pride (2002)
- Putin's Progress (2004)
- The Ascendancy of Political Risk Management and its Implications for Global Security and Business (2006) (published by the Royal United Services Institute)
- European Energy Security: Facing a Future of Increasing Dependency? (published by the Royal United Services Institute)

== See also ==
- Cash-for-questions affair, a political corruption scandal of the 1990s involving Conservative Members of Parliament
- The other Labour peers accused of corruption by the Sunday Times in 2009: Baron Moonie, Baron Snape, Baron Taylor

== Arms ==
Coat of arms of Peter Truscott, Baron Truscott

Adopted
2008
Coronet
Coronet of a Baron
Crest
A demi double-headed Eagle displayed Sable holding in each beak Or a Quill Argent spined Or
Escutcheon
Sable two Pallets nebuly Argent between six pairs of Keys bows interlaced the three in chief wards downwards and outwards those in base wards upwards and outwards Or
Supporters
On the dexter side a Bear Or gorged with a Coronet Argent in the mouth a Rose Or slipped and leaved Argent on the sinister a Lion Or gorged with a Coronet Argent in the mouth a Sprig of Birch also Argent
Motto
COGITA PISCEM
Badge
A Sailfish embowed Argent issuing from the beak a Line reflexed across the body Or
Symbolism
The Arms are based on those of Exeter College, Oxford, which have been blazoned as Argent two Bends nebuly within a Bordure Sable charged with eight pairs of Keys endorsed and interlaced in the rings Or. Russia and England are reflected in the Supporters, the grantee's wife being of Russian origin. Russia is again reflected with the double-headed eagle and the Caribbean with the sailfish Badge

Orders of precedence in the United Kingdom
Preceded by The Lord Carter of Coles	Gentlemen; Baron Truscott	Followed by The Lord Roberts of Llandudno
