= Sarah Southern =

British businessman (born 1980)

Sarah Southern (born 1980, Newcastle-upon-Tyne, England) is a British businesswoman and former Conservative Party official and aide to Prime Minister David Cameron. In 2012, she became embroiled in a so-called "Cash for Access" controversy after undercover journalists from The Sunday Times filmed the Conservative co-treasurer Peter Cruddas apparently offering access to the Prime Minister and his Chancellor George Osborne for £250,000. Southern is alleged to have introduced the journalists to Cruddas, while boasting to friends she had made "a tidy sum" by introducing people to the Prime Minister.

== Career ==
Southern briefly attended South Africa's Stellenbosch University before reading Politics and International Relations at the UK's University of Reading, completing the degree in 2001. Following her graduation she took a job at the Department for Environment, Food and Rural Affairs where she was employed as a press officer, but left the post seven months later to work for the Conservative Party. Initially she was the national organiser of the party's youth movement, Conservative Future, but went on from this to hold a number of positions over the next several years. Later roles within the Conservative Party include project manager for oversees voluntary project, Secretary-General of the International Young Democrat Union and senior event manager. She was appointed to the latter post in December 2009 and during the year she held the position claims to have become a close and trusted aide to Party leader David Cameron. During the 2010 general election campaign she was a member of the party's media strategy team.

In November 2010, following the announcement of a forthcoming referendum on the issue of whether or not to introduce the alternative voting system in the United Kingdom, Southern was appointed operations director of No to AV, the campaign to oppose the idea. Following the conclusion of that in May 2011, Southern established her own business, Sarah Southern Consulting, in June 2011.

On 24 March 2012, The Sunday Times released a video undercover reporters from the newspaper had secretly filmed Conservative Party co-treasurer Peter Cruddas allegedly offering them access to Prime Minister David Cameron and Chancellor George Osborne for £250,000. Southern is alleged to have introduced the reporters to Cruddas, and in the video described herself as a political aide. Cruddas resigned shortly after the video's release.
