= Peter Cruddas, Baron Cruddas =

English banker and businessman (born 1953)

The Right Honourable The Lord Cruddas
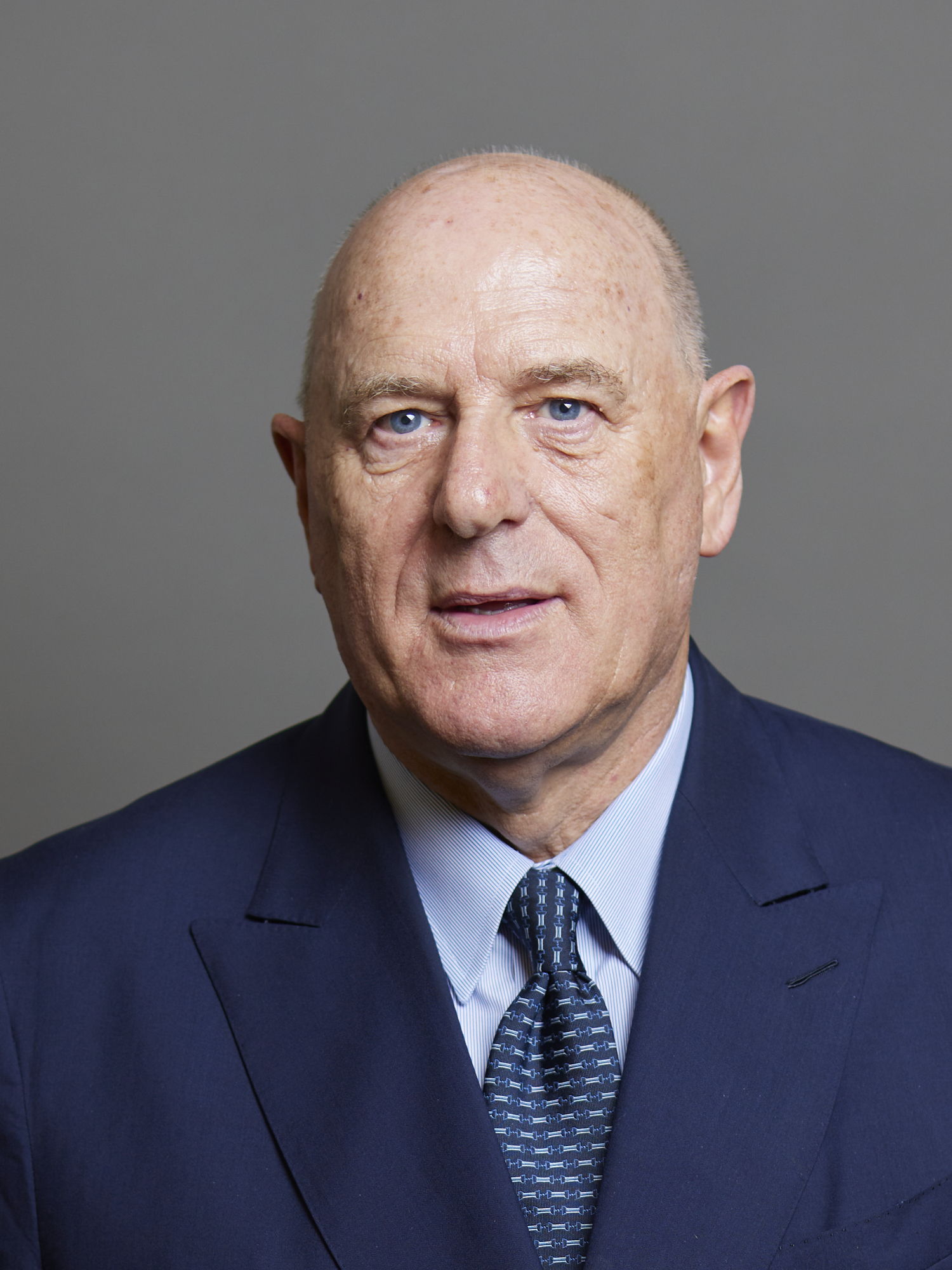
- Official portrait, 2021

Member of the House of Lords
- Lord Temporal
- Life peerage 27 January 2021

Treasurer of the Conservative Party
- In office 6 June 2011 – 24 March 2012
- Leader: David Cameron
- Deputy: Mike Chattey
- Chairman: The Lord Feldman of Elstree; The Baroness Warsi
- Preceded by: Richard Harrington (2010)
- Succeeded by: James Lupton (2013)

Personal details
- Born: Peter Andrew Cruddas; 30 September 1953 (age 73) Hackney, London, England
- Party: Conservative
- Spouse: Fiona Cruddas
- Children: 4 (2 from each marriage)
- Education: Shoreditch Comprehensive
- Occupation: Banker and businessman

Peter Andrew Cruddas, Baron Cruddas (born 30 September 1953) is an English banker and businessman. He is the founder of online trading company CMC Markets. In the 2007 Sunday Times Rich List, he was named the richest man in the City of London, with an estimated fortune of £860 million. In the 2026 Sunday Times Rich List, his fortune was estimated at £1.156 billion.

Cruddas was appointed Conservative Party co-treasurer in June 2011. In March 2012 it was alleged by The Sunday Times that he had offered access to the Prime Minister David Cameron and the Chancellor George Osborne, in exchange for cash donations of between £100,000 and £250,000. Cruddas resigned the same day.

In June 2013, Cruddas successfully sued The Sunday Times for libel over its coverage of him, which the High Court found had been defamatory. However, in March 2015, the Court of Appeal reduced the libel damages from the original £180,000 to £50,000, ruling that the Sunday Times's central allegation around "cash for access" had been borne out by the facts, while also ruling that a series of subsidiary allegations made in the same Sunday Times article were still false and defamatory.

In December 2020, it was announced he would be conferred a life peerage after a nomination by Prime Minister Boris Johnson, despite the contrary advice of the House of Lords Appointments Commission, which unanimously recommended that the Prime Minister rescind his nomination.

== Early life ==
The son of a father who worked as a porter at Smithfield Market, Cruddas has a twin brother Stephen and an elder brother John, both of whom later became taxi drivers. Born in the Metropolitan Borough of Hackney, the boys initially lived on the Bracklyn Court Estate, before moving to Vince Court when the twins were six. Cruddas points to his time in the Boy Scouts as pivotal, stating the organisation fostered the self-discipline and confidence he would later exploit in his career:

"The Boy Scouts enabled me to escape a violent home situation and the inner city. I sincerely believe that I would not be where I am today had I not become a member."

He attributes the family turmoil to his father's alcoholism, while recalling that his mother worked as a cleaner and single-handedly raised the children through hardship. She remained in London even during World War II to care for her own mother. Throughout interviews and in his autobiography, Cruddas refers to his mother as the primary driver of his success. He says he started his business only to impress her, and "then never stopped".

== Career ==
In his own words, Cruddas began working at the age of 14 as a weekend milkman for Express Dairies. As the family needed money, he left Shoreditch Comprehensive aged 15 with no qualifications and gained a job as a telex operator for Western Union in the City of London, earning about £7 a week. After being made redundant, he worked in the foreign currency trading rooms of various banks, including the Bank of Iran and Marine Midland. In 1982-89, he was chief dealer at SCF Equity Services.

By 1989, Cruddas had become the head foreign exchange dealer at the London branch of the Jordanian-based Petra Bank. He left the same year to set up his own business, starting CMC Markets with £10,000. His good fortune came during the 1991 Gulf War, when Arab banks asked him to act as an intermediary to obtain foreign exchange from Western institutions. In 1996, he became one of the first to offer online trading.

Cruddas served as CEO until October 2007 and again between July 2009 and June 2010. Between 2003 and March 2013, he also served as the group's executive chairman. In March 2013, after CMC Markets reported a 21% revenue decline and a £19.4 million pre-tax loss, Cruddas replaced CEO Doug Richards and returned as chief executive, later reducing the company's workforce by one-third. In 2016, CMC Markets floated on the London Stock Exchange, with reports ahead of the listing stating that Cruddas would sell a portion of his shares while retaining a majority stake. The IPO priced in February 2016, valuing the company at about £691 million. At the end of January 2026, his stake in CMC Markets was 59.02%.

== Politics ==
By August 2026, Cruddas had donated £4.5 million to the Conservative Party since 2009. On 31 July 2013 on the BBC's Newsnight programme he stated he had given more than £1 million. He donated £100,000 in the last quarter of 2010 and £50,000 in the first week of the 2010 general election campaign. According to The Sunday Times, on 5 February 2021—just one week after receiving his peerage—Cruddas's total donations surpassed £3 million. The Times noted that most party treasurers drastically reduce their contributions after being elevated to the Lords. Only one continued to donate as before, insisting that he did not want his generosity to appear like a brazen purchase of a title. In March 2025, The Guardian included Cruddas among peers who had donated more than £1 million before entering the House of Lords, and reported that donations from large pre-appointment donors tended to decline after they secured their seats when averaged over time.

=== Cash-for-Access scandal ===
Cruddas was appointed Conservative Party co-treasurer in June 2011 alongside Lord Fink, effectively the party's chief fund raiser, in succession to billionaire property tycoon David Rowland.

In 2012, he became embroiled in the "UK cash-for-access" scandal which ultimately forced his resignation as co-treasurer. The Sunday Times reported that Cruddas, in exchange for sizeable donations, offered exclusive dinners with prime minister David Cameron and the chancellor George Osborne. The reporters Jonathan Calvert and Heidi Blake had secretly filmed Cruddas stating that for a donation of £250,000 he would arrange "premier league" access to the government leaders, such as an invitation to dinners at Cameron's apartment in Downing Street, where the donor would "pick up a lot of information", pose "practically any question" or advance their interests if "unhappy about something".

The undercover journalists were introduced to Cruddas by Sarah Southern, a lobbyist who is David Cameron's former aide, and secured themselves a two-hour private meeting. The reporters posed as overseas financiers and claimed that their clients intended to buy distressed government assets and wanted to make political connections. Cruddas publicly apologised, stating that his claims were mere "bluster" and he lacked the authority to sway policy or guarantee outcomes for financial backers.

In July 2012, it became known that Cruddas was suing The Sunday Times for libel over its coverage of him. Initially, he appeared triumphant, securing £180,000 in damages on 31 July. However, in March 2015, all three judges of an appeal court ruled that the central allegation of the Sunday Times's story – that Cruddas had corruptly offered to potential donors access to leading members of the government – was supported by the evidence. While other related claims in the article remained unsubstantiated and defamatory, the judges cut the libel award from £180,000 to £50,000.

=== Brexit ===
Cruddas, a prominent Eurosceptic, was one of the most generous supporters of Brexit. As co-treasurer of the Vote Leave campaign, he was the first high-profile figure to announce a major donation, contributing £1 million in November 2015. Despite Cruddas's role in the pro-Brexit campaign, CMC Markets highlighted potential risks associated with Brexit in its prospectus. The document raised concerns about the financial and operational impacts of the UK leaving the EU. In total, Cruddas donated £1.5 million to the official Vote Leave campaign.

=== 2013 – present ===
In June 2019, Sky News reported that Cruddas donated £50,000 to Boris Johnson's Conservative leadership campaign.

During the 2022 Conservative leadership election, following the resignation of Boris Johnson, Cruddas led a campaign to reinstate Johnson as a candidate. He stated the governmental mass resignations leading to Johnson's resignation had been "anti-democratic to the party and to the electorate". He went on to found and preside over the Conservative Democratic Organisation, a pro-Johnson faction established in December 2022, purporting to seek greater representation of the party's membership in its governance. In August 2022, Cruddas threatened to cut off funding to the Conservatives unless they changed their constitution and reduced the power of the 1922 Committee of backbench MPs.

In June 2024 Cruddas shared several social media posts supporting Nigel Farage and the Reform UK party. An analysis by The Guardian revealed that out of his most recent 100 retweets on Twitter, 48 were in favour of Reform UK and Farage, while 12 criticised the Conservative Party and its government. Among his retweets was a post by Arron Banks claiming that "those who continue to support the Conservative Party are not patriots."

In August 2026, Cruddas said he had made no further donations to the Conservative Party since 2021 and would consider resuming financial support only if he was convinced that the party had returned to centre-right policies. Although he praised aspects of Reform UK's platform, he said he would not fund the party.

=== Peerage ===
In 2020, under prime minister Boris Johnson, Cruddas was nominated for a peerage, despite the House of Lords Appointments Commission explicitly stating it could not support his nomination. Johnson dismissed this advice, thus becoming the first prime minister ever to defy the commission's guidance. In a public letter to Lord Bew, the commission's chair, Johnson sought to justify his decision by referencing Cruddas's "outstanding contributions" to charity and his "long track of committed political service." The Guardian reported that Cruddas had donated more than £3.5 million to the Conservative Party since 2010, including a £500,000 donation delivered three days after he took his seat in the upper chamber in February 2021. The historian Lord Lexden described the nomination of Peter Cruddas as "the worst honours scandal in a century".

On 27 January 2021, Cruddas assumed the title Baron Cruddas of Shoreditch in the London Borough of Hackney. He made his maiden speech on 12 March 2021 in response to the budget statement. By 2023, The New Statesman named Cruddas the 38th most powerful right-wing British political figure for his financial ability to shape the Conservative Party's future.

== Charity ==
Cruddas has stated he has pledged a total of £100m to charitable causes.

In 2006, he established the Peter Cruddas Foundation, a grant-making charity supporting disadvantaged and disengaged young people in England and Wales. The foundation was dissolved via voluntary strike-off on 16 December 2025.

As of 2010, Cruddas was the largest individual donor to the Duke of Edinburgh Award International Association.

In 2011, The Independent ranked Cruddas as the fourth most generous philanthropist in its giving list. Cruddas supported the Great Ormond Street Hospital. He also supported the Royal Opera House and The Royal Ballet, and after becoming a member of the Chairman's Circle, in March 2012 was invited to become a trustee and join the board of the Royal Opera House though as of December 2024 he is no longer listed as either trustee or a board member.

By June 2011, he had resigned from the Prince's Trust, stepping back from one of his public philanthropic roles. Previously, Cruddas served as a trustee for the trust starting in March 2009. In 2008, the Peter Cruddas Foundation contributed £1 million to support the trust's Enterprise Programme in Wales.

== Personal life ==
Cruddas has four children, two from each marriage. His second wife is Fiona.

From 2001 to 2009, he resided in Monaco, commuting daily from an apartment on Avenue des Spélugues to London City Airport. A long-standing legal loophole, originating back in the steamship era, allowed the ultra-wealthy British business elite — including Cruddas — to maintain non-resident status while effectively continuing their professional activities in Britain. Under this regulation, they could spend up to 90 days per year in the UK, not counting the day of arrival and the day of departure, enabling them to work in the City three to four days a week and then return to Monaco, avoiding any income tax on dividends.

In a 2011 interview, he stated he owned "a £10m apartment in Monaco, a £5m house in Hertfordshire, a house in Antibes, a yacht and a private jet." He plays golf with a low handicap, composes quatrains, and supports Arsenal FC.

Cruddas recalls that the Conservative Party once requested he refrain from parking his silver Rolls-Royce outside its headquarters during meetings. He admits to still doing so occasionally, "as an act of defiance".

In 2016, Cruddas and his wife Fiona paid £42 million in cash for Balfour House, a seven-storey Victorian mansion in London's Mayfair district near Park Lane, formerly owned by the Iranian-born art dealer Nasser Khalili. Cruddas also owns the very first Rolls-Royce Wraith Kryptos.

In 2018 he was reported to have been a regular attendee of the Presidents Club Charity Dinner.

In January 2026, The Times included Cruddas in its annual Tax List ranking the UK's biggest taxpayers, estimating that he paid £29.4 million in UK tax.

== See also ==
- Cash for access

Orders of precedence in the United Kingdom
Preceded by The Lord McDonald of Salford	Gentlemen; Baron Cruddas	Followed by The Lord Kamall
