= Reeves Mews =

London street

Coordinates: 51°30′36″N 0°09′11″W

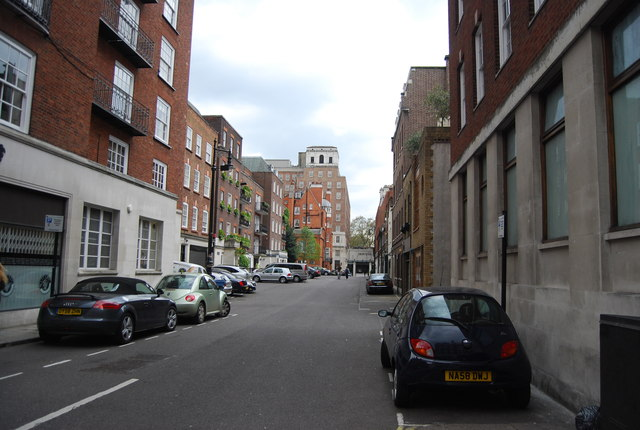
Reeves Mews in 2011

Reeves Mews is a street in central London's Mayfair district, running roughly west to east from Park Street to South Audley Street.

Christina Onassis had a three-bedroom flat in the street in the 1970s, and Aristotle Onassis and Jackie Kennedy were regular visitors. In 2015, it was listed for sale at £6 million.

In September 2015, a former 1920s Bentley garage become the world's most expensive mews home, when it sold for £24 million to a Qatari buyer.
