= Cash for access =

Cash for access refers to the exchange of money for delivering meetings with senior office-holders, such as politicians. In the United Kingdom (UK), which has seen a number of cash for access scandals, the public consider the practice sleazy and degrading British politics.

The phrased emerged following the 1998 Derek Draper "Lobbygate" scandal in the UK. Similar practices are "cash for questions" and "cash for honours", coined, respectively, following the Cash-for-questions (1994) and Cash-for-Honours (2006-7) scandals in the UK. These can all be described as "cash for favour scenarios".

Those receiving the money might be individuals or institutions, such as political parties, and the practice might be openly practiced - such as fundraising dinners for which guests pay large sums of money to dine with politicians - or potentially illegal. The practice is global, having occurred in countries such as the UK, Australia, Canada and China, and historic examples can be seen as far back as at least the early twentieth century.

== Examples ==
- Winston Churchill secured access to senior office holders for Burmah Oil (1923)
- Derek Draper "Lobbygate" scandal (UK, 1998)
- Sarah, Duchess of York cash for access scandal (UK, 2010)
- Peter Cruddas cash for access scandal (UK, 2012)
- Jack Straw and Malcolm Rifkind cash for access scandal (UK, 2015)
- Justin Trudeau cash-for-access scandal (Canada, 2016)

== See also ==
- Cash-for-questions affair
- Cash-for-Honours scandal
- Cash for influence
- Influence peddling
- List of political scandals in the United Kingdom
