= Influence peddling =

Form of lobbying

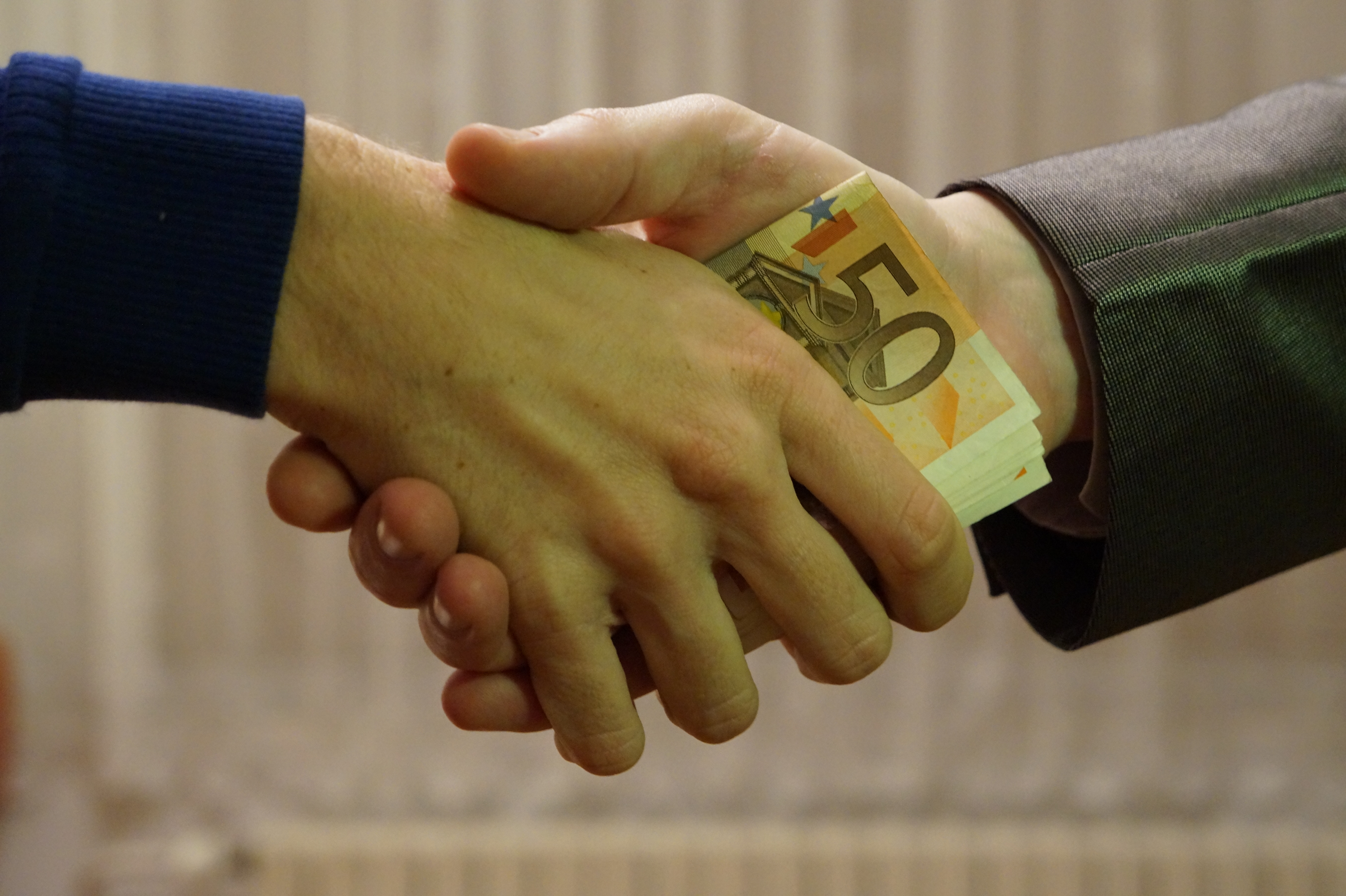
Trading cash for influence

Influence peddling, also called traffic of influence or trading in influence, is the practice of using one's influence in government or connections with authorities to obtain favours or preferential treatment for another, usually in return for payment. Influence peddling per se is not necessarily illegal, as the Organisation for Economic Co-operation and Development (OECD) has often used the modified term "undue influence peddling" to refer to illegal acts of lobbying; however, influence peddling is typically associated with corruption and may therefore delegitimise democratic politics with the general public. It is punishable as a crime in Argentina, Belgium, Bulgaria, Brazil, France, Hungary, Italy, Lithuania, Mexico, Portugal, Romania, Spain, and the United Kingdom.

== Known cases ==
In December 2008, Rod Blagojevich, the then Governor of Illinois, was accused of influence peddling in attempting to sell the U.S. Senate seat vacated by the then President-elect Barack Obama. Blagojevich was convicted in 2011 and sentenced to 14 years in prison. He was later pardoned by then-President Donald Trump by February 2020. Larry O'Brien, the then mayor of Ottawa, was brought to trial on similar grounds in May 2009. O'Brien was accused of purported influence peddling. On 5 August 2009, both charges were dismissed.

The 2009 cash for influence scandal was a political scandal in the United Kingdom concerning four Labour Party Life Peers offering to help make amendments to legislation in exchange for money.

In April 2009, former Newfoundland and Labrador politician Ed Byrne was convicted of influence peddling for his actions in the Constituency Allowance Scandal. He was the first of four politicians convicted in relation to the Scandal and the remaining politicians are on or awaiting trial.

A 2010 journalistic sting operation revealed Members of the United Kingdom Parliament and House of Lords offering to work for a fictitious political lobbying firm for fees of £3,000 to £5,000 per day (see 2010 cash for influence scandal).

In 2011, the European Commission's Anti-fraud Office opened a formal investigation for corruption against a number of Members of the European Parliament (MEPs) after an article in The Sunday Times claimed they had tried to influence EU legislation in exchange for money. Three MEPs were convicted.

In 2012, Amado Boudou, the then vice president of Argentina, was accused of being a mere straw owner of the printing house Ciccone Calcográfica, a private company that has contracts to print over 120 million new Argentine pesos banknotes, license plates, and other government issues. The scandal became known as Boudougate, as the contracts were awarded by Boudou himself when he was the Economy Minister. In 2018, Boudou was convicted of corruption and sentenced to 5 years and 10 months in prison, as well as being banned from running for office. He was granted parole in 2021, 5 years into his sentence

In the Radia tapes controversy of the late 2000s and early 2010, Nira Radia was under investigation for using her connections with Indian politicians and members of the Indian media to tilt the auction of multi-million dollar licence contracts in favour of certain companies and individuals. No major charges were brought against Radia, and the case did not result in convictions.

In 2014, former French President Nicolas Sarkozy was investigated due to alleged influence peddling. Sarkozy was convicted in March 2021 for corruption and influence peddling. He was sentenced to three years in prison, with two years suspended and one year to be served under house arrest.

In April 2015, the Public Prosecutor's Office of Brazil opened an investigation for influence peddling against Luiz Inácio Lula da Silva, at the time a former president of Brazil. It was alleged that, between 2011 and 2014, he lobbied for Odebrecht company to gain public procurements in foreign countries while also getting BNDES to finance those projects. Countries where this allegedly took place include Ghana, Angola, Cuba, and the Dominican Republic. Lula was later convicted on separate corruption charges and imprisoned but was released in 2019 after Brazil's Supreme Court annulled his sentences. In 2022, Lula was re-elected as president of Brazil.

On 9 December 2016, the National Assembly impeached Park Geun-hye, the president of South Korea from 2013 to 2017, on charges related to influence peddling by her top aide Choi Soon-sil, and Hwang Kyo-ahn, the then Prime Minister of South Korea, assumed her powers and duties as Acting President as a result. The Constitutional Court of Korea upheld the impeachment by a unanimous 8–0 ruling on 10 March 2017, thereby removing Park from office. On 6 April 2018, South Korean courts sentenced her to 24 years in prison; this was later increased to 25 years, and Park was imprisoned at Seoul Detention Center. In 2018, two separate criminal cases resulted in an increase of seven years in her prison sentence. She was found guilty of illegally taking off-the-book funds from the National Intelligence Service and given a five-year prison sentence, and also found guilty of illegally interfering in the Saenuri Party primaries in the 2016 South Korean legislative election, for which she was sentenced to two more years in prison.

In Australia, the former New South Wales minister and Labor powerbroker Eddie Obeid was convicted in 2016 of misconduct in public office and sentenced to five years' imprisonment for lobbying a senior state official about commercial leases at Sydney's Circular Quay without disclosing his family's interest in them. In 2021 Obeid, his son Moses and the former mining minister Ian Macdonald were convicted of conspiring to commit misconduct in public office over a coal exploration licence covering land owned by the Obeid family; the High Court of Australia dismissed their appeals in February 2026.

In July 2022 investigations began into the Qatar corruption scandal at the European Parliament (also known as "Qatargate"). A number of politicians have confessed or plead guilty to corruption.

In June 2023 the New South Wales Independent Commission Against Corruption found that Daryl Maguire, a state member of parliament from 1999 to 2018, had engaged in serious corrupt conduct by monetising his parliamentary position through a company that offered to sell access to "high levels of government": he pursued undisclosed commissions on property and migration deals, and sought payment for introducing a senior Chinese official to the then premier, Barry O'Farrell. It made the same finding against the former premier Gladys Berejiklian over her undisclosed relationship with Maguire, a finding upheld by the New South Wales Court of Appeal in 2024. Maguire was convicted in 2026 of conspiracy over a fraudulent visa scheme examined in the same inquiry.

In November 2023, the Order and Justice political party of Lithuania was convicted through last instance for charges dating back to 2013, when it pressured a number of connected or dependent civil servants working for Ministry of the Interior (Lithuania), Ministry of Environment (Lithuania) to influence results of public procurement to benefit specific businessman who in turn donated or illegitimately paid for political campaign publicity.

In Australia, membership of the invitation-only Chairman's Lounge run by the airline Qantas cannot be bought and is granted at the airline's discretion; by October 2024, 181 of the 227 federal parliamentarians had disclosed access on the registers of interests, as had senior officers of the airline's regulators. The journalist Joe Aston, who in 2023 described the airline as "one of the most successful influence peddling machines in modern Australia", wrote in 2024 that the lounge was where "Qantas' skilful influence-peddling meets the spectacular entitlement culture of the nation's parliamentary caste". In July 2023 the government refused a request by Qatar Airways to expand its Australian services, having consulted only Qantas and Virgin Australia about it; a Senate select committee found that at least 12 different arguments had been advanced for the decision. A former chair of the competition regulator, Allan Fels, called it "just looking after Qantas"; the transport minister, Catherine King, said she had not taken either airline's commercial interests into account, and Aston said it had not necessarily been made in exchange for lounge memberships. Transparency International Australia said such benefits could lead to "undue influence on policy making"; the transport economist Rico Merkert said it was "impossible to know" whether decisions favouring Qantas were attributable to lounge access.

The Biden family has faced allegations of influence peddling related to foreign business dealings. In 2025, President Joe Biden issued a pardon for his brother, James Biden, who was under investigation for allegedly leveraging the family's political connections for financial gain. The pardon effectively ended the probe, drawing criticism and raising questions about accountability and ethics in public office.

In March 2025, Bernard Squarcini, former head of France's domestic intelligence agency, was convicted of influence peddling and sentenced to four years in prison. Squarcini was found guilty of leveraging his official position to benefit luxury conglomerate LVMH by accessing confidential police files and conducting unauthorized surveillance on behalf of the company.

== See also ==
- Bribery
- Cash for access
- Cash for influence
- Lobbying
- Logrolling
- Money trail
- Political corruption
- Political finance
- Pork barrel politics
