= Cash-for-questions affair =

1990s UK political scandal

The cash-for-questions affair was a political scandal of the 1990s in the United Kingdom.

It began in October 1994 when The Guardian newspaper alleged that London's most successful parliamentary lobbyist, Ian Greer of Ian Greer Associates, had bribed two Conservative Members of Parliament to ask parliamentary questions and perform other tasks on behalf of the Egyptian owner of Harrods department store, Mohamed Al-Fayed.

== Overview ==
The Guardian's report alleged that Al-Fayed had approached the paper and accused Ian Greer of paying then-MPs Neil Hamilton and Tim Smith to table parliamentary questions on his behalf at £2,000 a time. Smith resigned immediately after admitting to accepting payments from Al-Fayed himself, but not from Greer as The Guardian had alleged.

Hamilton and Greer immediately issued libel writs in the High Court against The Guardian to clear their names.

The furore prompted the then-prime minister John Major to instigate the Nolan Committee, to review the issue of standards in public life.

Six weeks later in December 1994, in a private letter to the chairman of the parliamentary watchdog the Members' Interests Committee, Mohamed Al-Fayed alleged that he had paid Hamilton, in addition to the original allegations that Ian Greer was the paymaster. Hamilton denied this new allegation.

The Defamation Act 1996 was designed to alter the Bill of Rights 1689, and allows an MP to waive parliamentary privilege. This would have permitted Hamilton to give evidence in court concerning statements he made in the House of Commons.

Two years later, at the end of September 1996, three days before Hamilton's and Greer's libel actions were due to start, three of Mohamed Al-Fayed's employees claimed that they had processed cash payments to the two men. Hamilton and Greer denied these new allegations.

Hamilton and Greer withdrew their libel action on 30 September 1996.

Hamilton's and Greer's withdrawal of their libel actions provoked an avalanche of condemnation of the two men in the British press, led by The Guardian. Parliament initiated an official inquiry into the affair, to be led by Sir Gordon Downey.

In December 1996, Ian Greer's lobbying company collapsed.

Downey began his inquiry in early 1997, but before he published his report Prime Minister John Major prorogued Parliament for a general election, to be held on 1 May 1997.

Smith resigned from Parliament on 25 March, and stood down in the general election.

In the election, former BBC reporter Martin Bell stood in Hamilton's Cheshire constituency of Tatton as an independent candidate on an "anti-corruption" platform. Bell easily defeated Hamilton with the assistance of the Labour Party and the Liberal Democrats, who both withdrew their candidates and supplied party workers to help Bell's campaign.

Sir Gordon Downey published his 900-page report in early July 1997, clearing Ian Greer, Neil Hamilton, and Tim Smith of The Guardian's original allegations that Ian Greer had paid the two MPs to table questions. However, Downey decreed that the three Fayed employees' testimony that they had processed cash payments to Hamilton amounted to "compelling evidence", though he did not accept their claims to have processed cash payments to the lobbyist Greer.

At the same time, the Standards and Privileges Committee published its conclusions in relation to complaints made by The Guardian and Mohamed Al Fayed, which concluded:

=== Standard and Privileges Committee Report ===
==== Michael Brown ====
Mr Brown failed to register an introduction payment from Mr Greer in relation to US Tobacco.

Mr Brown persistently and deliberately failed to declare his interests in dealing with Ministers and officials over the Skoal Bandits issue.

Mr Brown has expressed regret for these omissions.

==== Sir Peter Hordern ====
He had no obligation to disclose to Ministers the interests of his colleagues.

Although the extent to which he declared his own interests on House of Fraser matters fell well short of the terms of the 1974 Resolution, there is no evidence that Ministers and officials were misled by this.

The spirit of the rules would have been better observed had Sir Peter made a separate Register entry in respect of Mr Al Fayed's hospitality, but this omission was not improper by the standards accepted at the time.

The allegation that Sir Peter tabled questions for cash is without substance and has been withdrawn.

==== Sir Andrew Bowden ====
There is insufficient evidence to substantiate the allegation that Sir Andrew received, or demanded, cash payments from Mr Al Fayed in return for lobbying services.

The election donation of £5,319 from Mr Greer was intended as a reward for lobbying and Sir Andrew probably knew it came originally from Mr Al Fayed.

Sir Andrew failed to register, as he should have done, this election campaign donation.

Sir Andrew failed to declare his interests in dealings with Ministers and officials over House of Fraser, and, in one case, gave a positively misleading explanation for his representations.

==== Sir Michael Grylls ====
Sir Michael received payments from Mr Greer (though not in cash) which were neither introduction commissions nor fees associated with the Unitary Tax Campaign.

It is not possible to conclude that these payments originated from Mr Al Fayed, although Sir Michael actively participated in the Greer lobbying operation.

Sir Michael deliberately misled the Select Committee on Members' Interests in 1990 by seriously understating the number of commission payments he had received; and by omitting to inform them of other fees received from Mr Greer.

Sir Michael persistently failed to declare his interests in dealings with ministers and officials over the House of Fraser.

Sir Michael's action in taking a commission payment for introducing a constituent to Mr Greer was unacceptable.

There is insufficient evidence to show that Sir Michael solicited business for Mr Greer in expectation of commission payments.

==== Mr Tim Smith ====
Mr Smith accepted cash payments directly from Mr Al Fayed of between £18,000 and £25,000 in return for lobbying services. There is no evidence to indicate that he received cash from Mr Al Fayed indirectly through Mr Greer.

The way in which these payments were received and concealed fell well below the standards expected of members of parliament.

The allegation that Mr Smith was paid to initiate an Adjournment debate in 1986 is not substantiated.

Mr Smith's financial interest in relation to House of Fraser was only registered in January 1989 when it had been publicly exposed by Mr Rowland; and then only hesitantly for a period of two and a half weeks. This has to be seen as a disingenuous attempt at concealment. On any view, this was a totally unacceptable form of registration by Mr Smith.

Mr Smith persistently and deliberately failed to declare his interests in dealings with ministers and officials over House of Fraser issues.

To his credit, Mr Smith eventually admitted receiving payments, although not until he was asked in 1994; and he expressed his regrets for the non-registration and non-declaration of interests.

Smith accepted cash payments directly from Mr Al Fayed of between £18,000 and £25,000 in return for lobbying services… persistently and deliberately failed to declare his interests in dealings with Ministers and officials over House of Fraser issues … Mr Smith's conduct fell seriously below the standards which the House is entitled to expect … had he still been a Member we would recommend a substantial period of suspension from the service of the House.

== Hamilton v Al-Fayed ==
In 1998 Neil Hamilton issued a writ for libel against Mohamed al-Fayed, over allegations that Al-Fayed had made on a Channel 4 documentary programme broadcast in January 1997. In late 1999 the trial began at the High Court. Hamilton lost and was ordered to pay costs.

In late 2000, Hamilton's appeal was heard at the Court of Appeal. The three judges dismissed Hamilton's appeal on the grounds that Fayed's acquisition of the stolen papers would not have materially affected the outcome of the trial.

In 2001 Neil Hamilton declared bankruptcy.

== Riddick and Treddinick ==
Though the term "cash for questions affair" is used to refer to the events that followed the publication of The Guardian's story, it was not the first time that a British newspaper had accused MPs of taking bribes to table questions. Three months earlier, in July 1994, a 'sting' operation by The Sunday Times reported that two Conservative MPs Graham Riddick and David Treddinick had accepted cheques for £1,000 for agreeing to table a parliamentary question.

The two were suspended from parliament for 10 and 20 days respectively, Mr Riddick receiving a shorter 'sentence' due to his apparent decision to apologise quickly and return his cheque bribe.

Riddick lodged a formal complaint with the Press Complaints Commission (PCC). Basing its decisions on the information compiled by the Commons' Privileges Committee the PCC found in Riddick's favour. The commission judged that The Sunday Times failed to make clear to its readers that its approach to Riddick had been on the basis of a legitimate consultancy, not on the basis of a one-off payment in return for asking a question and that there was no justification for the newspaper's resort to subterfuge. This overturned a ruling two years earlier by the PCC in favour of The Sunday Times when Riddick had been unaware that the PCC was investigating the matter. The PCC apologised to Riddick for 'this serious breach of our procedures.'

== See also ==
- List of political scandals in the United Kingdom
- Cash-for-Honours scandal
- Cash for access
- Cash for influence
- Patrick Mercer
- Owen Paterson
