= All Saints Catholic School =

All Saints Catholic School or All Saints Roman Catholic School may refer to:

== Canada ==
- All Saints Catholic Secondary School, Whitby, Ontario
- All Saints Catholic Elementary School, Markham, Ontario

== United Kingdom ==
- All Saints Catholic School, Dagenham, England
- All Saints Catholic School, West Wickham, England
- All Saints Catholic School, York, England

== United States ==
- All Saints Catholic School (Norwalk, Connecticut)
- All Saints Catholic School (Omaha, Nebraska)
- All Saints Catholic School, in the Roman Catholic Diocese of Dallas, Texas
- All Saints Catholic School (Rossford, Ohio)

== See also ==
- All Saints Academy (disambiguation)
- All Saints College (disambiguation)
- All Saints High School (disambiguation)
- All Saints University (disambiguation)
- All Saints (disambiguation), includes other schools called "All Saints"
