= All Saints School =

All Saints School may refer to:

== England ==
- All Saints Catholic School, Dagenham, a Roman Catholic secondary school in Dagenham, London, England
- Bloxham School (also called All Saints' School), an independent boarding school in Oxfordshire, England
- All Saints Roman Catholic School, York, a Roman Catholic secondary school in York, England.

== Malaysia ==
- All Saints Secondary School, Kota Kinabalu, a national single-session secondary school in Sabah, Malaysia
- All Saints National Primary School, Kamunting, a government-funded primary school in Perak, Malaysia

== United States ==
- All Saints School (Sioux Falls, South Dakota), a historic private school listed on the National Register of Historic Places

== See also ==
- All Saints High School (disambiguation)
- All Saints Academy (disambiguation)
- All Saints College (disambiguation)
- All Saints Episcopal School (disambiguation)
- All Saints University (disambiguation)
