= Minerva Building =

Cancelled skyscraper in the City of London

Coordinates: 51.5146°N 0.0770°W

The Minerva Building was a skyscraper that was once planned for the eastern edge of London's main financial district, the City of London. If it had been built, it would have been the first building in the City of London to contain more than 1,000,000 sq ft (100,000 m^{2}) of office space.

== History ==
A revised planning application by developers Minerva plc for the 53-storey version was submitted during the week ending on 12 July 2002. The original proposal for the site, known as the St. Botolph's House, was a 14-storey office block. In 2001, this was revised to a 36-storey, 159 metres (522 ft) tall office tower. A post-September 11 revision brought structural and design changes and a further increase in height, to 53 floors and 217 metres (712 ft).

Its location marks the Eastern gateway to the city, and the building might have acted as a focus for the regeneration of the eastern City fringe. The site is outside the strategic views of St. Paul's, and does not contain listed buildings, although it does infringe upon a conservation area. It also lies within one of the three proposed viewing cones for the Tower of London, as do 30 St Mary Axe, Heron Tower and Tower 42.

Although the official height was 219m, the building was claimed to have planning permission for an antenna, which might have seen its pinnacle height rise to 247 metres (810 ft). The developers claimed that a restaurant would have been open to the public on the highest floor.

In March 2006, amidst the Cash for Peerages political scandal, it emerged that the Office of the Deputy Prime Minister had not called in the application for the Minerva Building (nor Minerva's Park Place proposals in Croydon) shortly after two of Minerva's senior figures had made major donations and loans to the Labour Party. This led some commentators to suggest a connection between the loans and the decision.

In mid-2006, it was announced that Minerva, deep within a period of financial consolidation, was no longer actively pursuing the development of the site. A mid-rise commercial development occurred instead on the site.
