= St. Matthew the Evangelist Catholic School =

Location
- 60 Willowbrook Drive; Whitby, Ontario, L1R 1S6; Canada; 43.906319°N 78.948355°W

Information
- School type: Catholic Elementary school
- Religious affiliation: Roman Catholic
- Established: 1990
- School board: Durham Catholic District School Board
- Area trustee: Christopher Leahy; Mark McGowan
- School number: 830801
- Principal: Lucia Goodwin
- Grades: JK-8
- Enrolment: 505 (2012)
- Language: English
- Colours: Green, Yellow, and White
- Team name: Magic
- Parish: Holy Family Catholic Church
- Full-Day Kindergarten: Yes
- Website: stmatthews.dcdsb.ca

St. Matthew the Evangelist Catholic School (St. Matthew) is a coeducational, Catholic, elementary school in Whitby, Ontario, managed by the Durham Catholic District School Board. St. Matthew is located in Willowbrook Drive near Ormiston Public School. It was named after St. Matthew the Evangelist, one of the 12 Apostles Jesus chose. Today, St. Matthew serves students from Junior Kindergarten to 8th grade.

St. Matthew the Evangelist School is a feeder school for Father Leo J. Austin Catholic Secondary School and All Saints Catholic Secondary School.

== History ==
St. Matthew the Evangelist Catholic School was established in September 1990 with originally 15 classrooms. A YMCA daycare was also included in the building and is still active in the school today. The school is best known for its charity work and its environmental responsibility. It is currently rated as a Gold Eco-school.

As of the 2013/2014 school year, the school began its Full-Day Kindergarten program allowing Junior and Senior Kindergartens to have full regular days of school.

== Academics ==
At St. Matthew's, the students are encouraged to do well in academics.

In the grade 8 Graduation Ceremony, Honour Roll are presented for students who have achieved an academic average of 80% or higher. There are also other separate awards for outstanding achievement. For example: a specific student who has shown an outstanding achievement is either given a Math Award, Literacy Award, Athlete of the Year award, or a French Award, etc., depending on what subject(s) they did well on.

== Extra-curricular ==
The school participates in athletics such as tournaments with the Durham District Elementary Catholic Athletic Association (DDECAA). Sports teams at St. Matthew's includes Cross Country, Flag Football, Volleyball, Basketball, Tchoukball, Co-ed Soccer, and Track and Field for both Juniors (grades 4-6) and Seniors (grades 7-8). However, Cross Country and Track and Field are for students grades 3-8.

Other than sports clubs, there are a variety of school clubs you can join at St. Matthew's. At St. Matthew's, you can join the eco-club, band, choir, and others.

== School Prayer ==
Pray for us St. Matthew
That we may be the followers of the promise of Christ as you,
St. Matthew were for him.

Teach us to walk in your light
Along the chosen road of God.
The Lord gathers us in his arms to call us to be His children.

Help strengthen our community of love
And allow us to serve others before ourselves.
O God let us follow your call.
AMEN.

== School Hours ==
8:45 (Entrance Bell)
10:10 (Recess)
11:30 - 12:30 (Lunch)
1:55 (Recess)
3:15 (Dismissal)

== Notable alumni ==
James Neal, Hockey player
