= All Saints Academy =

All Saints Academy or All Saints' Academy may refer to:

== England ==
- All Saints' Academy, Cheltenham, a secondary school in Gloucestershire
- All Saints Academy, Darfield, a primary school in South Yorkshire
- All Saints Academy, Dunstable, a secondary school in Bedfordshire
- All Saints Academy, Ingleby Barwick, a secondary school in North Yorkshire
- All Saints' Catholic Academy, a secondary school in Mansfield, Nottinghamshire
- All Saints Church of England Academy, Plymouth, a secondary school in Devon
- All Saints Church of England Academy, Wyke Regis, a secondary school in Dorset
- ARK All Saints Academy, a secondary school in Southwark, London
- Rossington All Saints Academy, a secondary school in South Yorkshire

== United States ==
- All Saints' Academy (Florida), a preparatory school in Winter Haven, Florida
- All Saints Catholic Academy, in Bayonne, New Jersey

== See also ==
- All Saints College (disambiguation)
- All Saints School (disambiguation)
- All Saints (disambiguation), includes other schools called "All Saints"
- All Saints University (disambiguation)
