= Philippe Legrain =

British political economist and writer (born 1973)

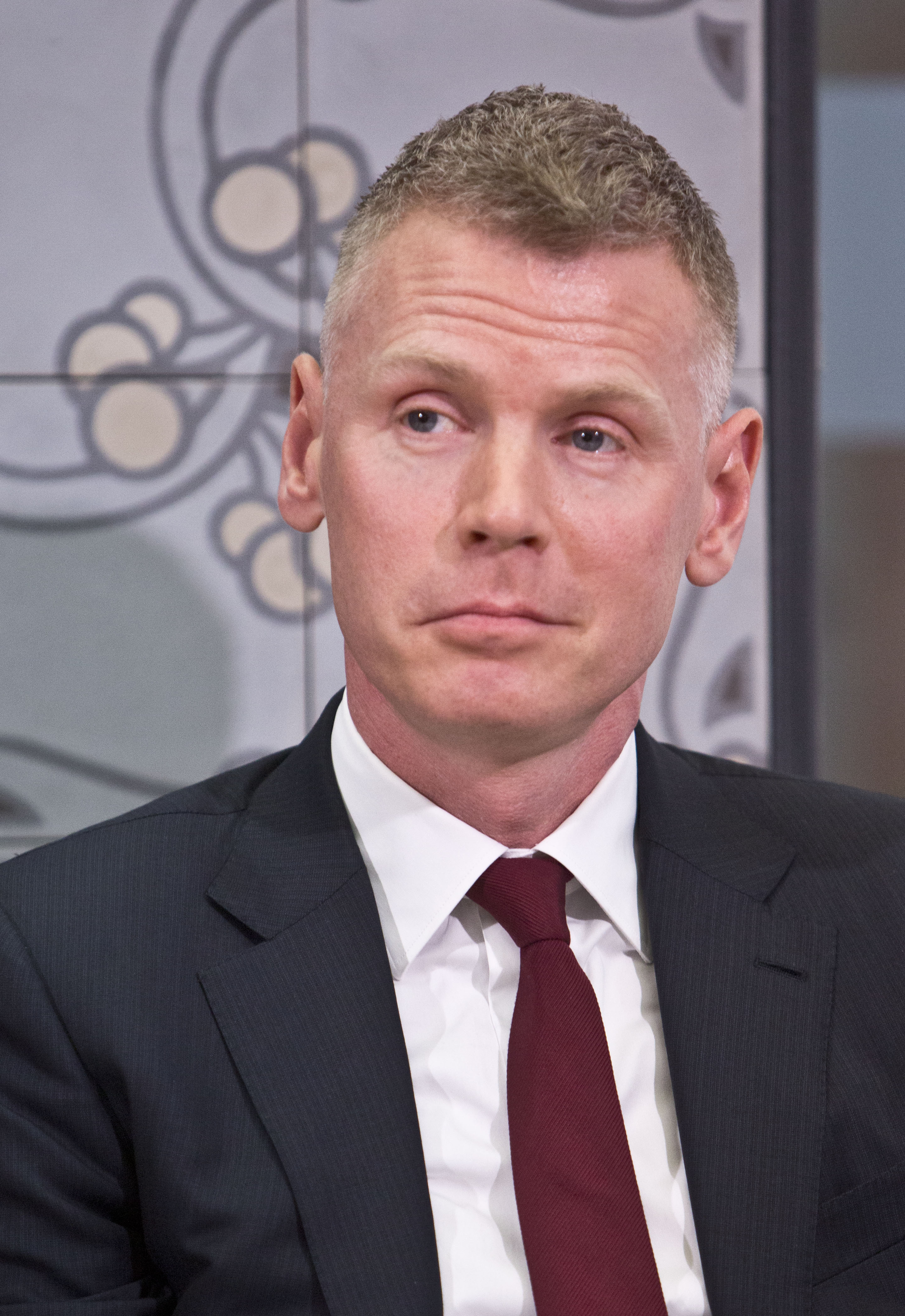
- Philippe Legrain in Hungary in March 2016
- Born: 1973 (age 52–53); London
- Occupations: British political economist and writer
- Known for: Trade and economics correspondent for The Economist; Special adviser to WTO director-general Mike Moore; Chief economist and director of policy for the pro-European pressure group, Britain in Europe
- Notable work: Former adviser to European Commission president José Manuel Barroso

Philippe Legrain is a British political economist and writer. He specializes in global and European economic issues, notably globalisation, migration, the post-crisis world and the euro. A visiting senior fellow at the London School of Economics' European Institute, he is a former adviser to European Commission president José Manuel Barroso from 2011 to 2014.

== Early life and background ==
Legrain was born in 1973. His father is French and his mother Estonian. They met in New York and married in 1969. They moved to London where Philippe was born and he considers himself British "though cosmopolitan in outlook".

== Career ==
Legrain is the author of four books: Open World: The Truth about Globalisation, which is a counter-argument to Naomi Klein's No Logo; Immigrants: Your Country Needs Them was shortlisted for the 2007 Financial Times and Goldman Sachs Business Book of the Year Award; Aftershock: Reshaping the World Economy After the Crisis; and European Spring: Why Our Economies and Politics are in a Mess – and How to Put Them Right, which the Financial Times calls "essential reading".

From February 2011 to February 2014, he was principal adviser and head of the analysis team at the Bureau of European Policy Advisers to the president of the European Commission, José Manuel Barroso. As such, he provided President Barroso with independent economic advice and led the team which provides him with strategic policy advice.

Before that, Legrain was a visiting fellow at the European Institute of the London School of Economics, a senior fellow at the Lisbon Council for Economic Competitiveness and Social Renewal and a contributing editor to Prospect magazine. A commentator for BBC TV and radio, he has written for various newspapers and magazines, including the Financial Times, The Guardian, The Times, The Independent, the Wall Street Journal Europe and the New Statesman. He is an advocate of freer international migration, globalisation, the euro and a land value tax. In 2016, he claimed that money invested in refugees could be doubled in economic benefits within five years.

Legrain has also been trade and economics correspondent for The Economist, special adviser to WTO director-general Mike Moore, and chief economist and director of policy for the pro-European pressure group, Britain in Europe.

He holds a BSc in economics and an MSc in politics of the world economy, both from the London School of Economics.

== Bibliography ==
- Open World: The Truth about Globalisation (2002) Philippe Legrain ISBN 0-349-11529-X ISBN 978-0349115290
- Immigrants: Your Country Needs Them (2007) Philippe Legrain ISBN 0-316-73248-6 ISBN 978-0316732482
- Aftershock: Reshaping the World Economy After the Crisis (2010) Philippe Legrain ISBN 1-4087-0223-1 ISBN 978-1408702239
- European Spring: Why Our Economies and Politics are in a Mess – and How to Put Them Right (2014) Philippe Legrain
