= Park Place (Croydon) =

- Location: Croydon, England
- Coordinates: 51.3729°N 0.0988°W
- Opened: Project abandoned
- Developer: Minerva
- Owner: Minerva
- Num. of anchor tenants: 2
- Floor area: 1,080,000 sq ft (100,000 m^{2})
- Floors: 4

Park Place was a proposed shopping centre which had been expected to open in Croydon, London by 2011. The date was continuously pushed back due to a number of problems between different developers, financial backers and the local council. It was cancelled in 2009, as other schemes began progress, such as the extension to Centrale and the possible takeover of the Whitgift Centre by Westfield Group. Park Place was part of the Croydon Vision 2020 re-generation scheme.

Park Place has been proposed by developers Minerva and was given planning approval in 2000 by Croydon Council after which the Government Office for London decided not to proceed with a call-in in 2003, despite concerns over traffic and the impact upon existing retail. This decision, ultimately by Deputy Prime Minister John Prescott, caused controversy in 2006 amidst the Cash for Peerages political scandal, when it emerged that two of Minerva's previous and current chairmen, David Garrard and Andrew Rosenfeld, had made major loans to the Labour Party three months before the decision not to call in the planning application. Prescott denied any wrongdoing.

In May 2009, Croydon Council announced that it would be ending the development agreement with Minerva following a realisation that they would not be able to secure funding after Lendlease pulled out of the project.

== Plans ==
Minerva planned to build a shopping centre, office accommodation and bus station on the site of the Allders department store and St George's Walk. The scheduled commencement date for Park Place was originally Autumn 2006. Gap, John Lewis, Habitat and Borders expressed their desire to have a store in the centre, with an Apple Store another potential buyer of a unit. It was intended that the centre when completed would be 1,080,000 sq ft (100,000 m^{2}), with the development adjoining and integrating with the existing Whitgift Centre at its northern end and extend south to Katherine Street. The overall site would have taken in part of Park Street and cross the western end of George Street via a bridge and tunnel with the existing Grade II listed frontages in George Street, as well as the North End facade of Allders to be retained.

A compulsory purchase order by Croydon Council is in the process of being enacted to enable the whole site to come under the ownership of Minerva. A major new department store will be located to the south of the new site; originally this was to be a new Allders store, then owned by Minerva, but John Lewis was then lined up to anchor the site. On 5 May 2006 John Lewis announced that no development scheme in Croydon met their requirements and that they were not in negotiations with Minerva.

Nestlé, whose UK headquarters in the Nestlé Tower formed part of the site, planned to take part of the office accommodation.

== Viability ==
The overall viability of the Minerva plans (1.08 million sq.ft. shopping centre) was thrown into doubt following the building of the 1.615 million sq.ft. Westfield London shopping centre development in White City which opened in October 2008 and the existing 1,600,000 sq ft (150,000 m^{2}) shopping development at Bluewater in Kent.

On 19 March Minerva announced that their deal with Lendlease had collapsed. Lendlease were responsible for negotiations with John Lewis.

In May 2008, Croydon Council announced that they did not expect works to start until late 2009, a further delay of some 18 months. A revised planning application was not expected to be tabled until late 2008. Minerva meanwhile was facing speculation of a takeover bid by the Dubai-based Limitless.
