= All Saints Church, Port Augusta =

All Saints Church
- All Saints Catholic Church
- All Saints Church
- 32°29′35″S 137°45′45″E
- Location: Port Augusta, South Australia
- Country: Australia
- Denomination: Catholic Church
- Website: ppcatholic.org/parishes/port-augusta/

History
- Status: Parish church
- Founded: 5 July 1882
- Dedication: All Saints

Architecture
- Functional status: Active
- Style: Spanish Mission / Revival
- Years built: 1976

Administration
- Diocese: Port Pirie

Clergy
- Pastor: Fr Sijo Pynappalill CSC

All Saints Church is a Roman Catholic parish church in Port Augusta, South Australia, administered by the Diocese of Port Pirie.

== History ==
The Catholic parish in Port Augusta was established in the late 19th century. Bishop Christopher Reynolds laid the foundation stone for the original Gothic church and presbytery on 5 July 1882.

The original building was replaced in the 1970s. Designed under the direction of parish priest Father Leo Dundon, the present church complex was opened on 24 October 1976. Built in a Spanish revival style suited to the local climate, the complex incorporates a walled internal courtyard.

== Murphy Bell ==
The church bell tower houses a bell cast by J. Murphy in Dublin in 1883 at a cost of £100. It is cast in bronze with depictions of a shamrock and a harp, and bears the Latin inscription "Sancta Maria et Omnes Sancti intercedant pro nobis ad domum" ("Holy Mary and All Saints intercede for us to the Lord"). Originally installed in a smaller structure adjacent to the 1882 building, the bell was relocated to the current tower during the 1976 reconstruction and restored in 2004.

== Associated churches ==
The parish also encompasses the Church of Saints Alexis and John Nepomucene in nearby Wilmington, which has operated since 1908.

== See also ==
- Catholic Church in Australia
- Roman Catholic Diocese of Port Pirie
