= All Saints =

All Saints, All Saints' or All Saints Day may refer to:

- All Saints' Day, a Christian holiday

== Arts and entertainment ==
=== Film and television ===
- All Saints (film), a 2017 Christian drama film
- All Saints (TV series), an Australian hospital drama
- The Boondock Saints II: All Saints Day, a 2009 film

=== Music ===
- All Saints (group), a British girl group
  - All Saints (All Saints album), 1997
- All Saints (David Bowie album), 2001
- "All Saints", a song by David Bowie from the 1991 re-release of Low
- "All St. Day", a song by ...And You Will Know Us by the Trail of Dead from the 2003 album The Secret of Elena's Tomb
- All Saints Records, a British record label

== Places ==
- All Saints, Antigua and Barbuda
- All Saints, Devon, England
- All Saints, Wolverhampton, England
- All Saints' (ward), a former Manchester City Council electoral ward, England
- All Saints (Kettering BC Ward), an electoral ward in Northamptonshire, England
- All Saints DLR station, a railway station in East London, England

== Schools ==
- All Saints Academy (disambiguation)
- All Saints Anglican School, Merrimac, Queensland, Australia
- All Saints Catholic School (disambiguation)
- All Saints College (disambiguation)
- All Saints High School (disambiguation)
- All Saints University (disambiguation)

== Other uses ==
- AllSaints, a British fashion retailer
- All Saints GAC, a Gaelic Athletic Association football club in Northern Ireland
- All Saints Estate Winery, in Victoria, Australia

== See also ==
- All Saints Church (disambiguation)
- All Saints' Abbey (disambiguation)
- All Saints Anglican Church (disambiguation)
- All Saints Episcopal Church (disambiguation)
- All Saints Cathedral (disambiguation)
- All Saints Chapel (disambiguation)
- All Hallows (disambiguation)
- "For All the Saints", a Christian hymn
- For All the Saints: A Prayer Book for and by the Church, Lutheran breviary
- The Feast of All Saints (novel), a 1979 novel by Anne Rice
