= Des Smith (headteacher) =

British headteacher

- Born: Desmond P Smith
- Died: March 2026; N/A
- Occupation: Headteacher
- Known for: Educational achievement, Cash for Honours

Desmond 'Des' P Smith MA, BA, ACDip was, until his retirement in July 2006, the headteacher at All Saints Catholic School and Technology College, Dagenham, England. Smith attracted media attention by making the indiscreet remarks that triggered the Cash for Honours scandal.

== All Saints Catholic School, Dagenham ==
Smith was the head of All Saints Catholic School, Dagenham (until 1989 known as Bishop Ward) to 2006. When he took over, standards at Bishop Ward were poor with an atmosphere described as "depressed and violent". Following the appointment of Smith in 1984 results steadily improved until in 2003 it was considered "the second most improved school in England". Smith had worked with Paul Grant, head at Robert Clack School, also in Dagenham, to drive up standards at both schools.

Smith described his career high as "My first prize-giving evening as headteacher. It was very humbling to recognise the effort and hard work of our pupils."

According to his local Labour MP Jon Cruddas, Smith did a "fantastic" job at his school. Crudas also said that Smith "had transformed the lives of thousands of poor children". His "clear and focused" leadership was praised by Ofsted.

== City Academy programme ==
Des Smith was a council member of the Specialist Schools and Academies Trust (of which Lord Levy was the President), which helped the government recruit sponsors for the £5bn City Academy programme. He was appointed to the Trust's Council in November 2005 and resigned from the Council in January 2006. Smith was contracted by Veredus Interim Management to act as a consultant to the Department of Education and Skills, a position from which he also stepped down in January 2006.

== Cash for Honours ==
In January 2006 the Sunday Times embarked on a sting operation to investigate allegations that honours were available to be 'bought'. Over a champagne dinner with an undercover reporter Smith is alleged to have said "Because basically ... the prime minister's office would recommend someone like Malcolm (a fictional potential donor) for an OBE, a CBE or a knighthood". When the investigation was published Smith quit his post with the Specialist Schools and Academies Trust in January 2006.

On 13 April 2006 the Metropolitan Police arrested Smith under the Honours (Prevention of Abuses) Act 1925 but, shortly afterwards, Scotland Yard announced that he was freed on bail "to return... pending further inquiries". Smith gave an emotional interview in which he said "I demand that Blair is arrested at 10 Downing Street at 7.20am, that he is taken to a police station – hopefully Stoke Newington, which is a very unpleasant Bastille-type place – and treated the same way that I have been treated", mirroring his own experience of arrest. The Crown Prosecution Service announced, on 7 February 2007, that Smith would not face any charges because there was "insufficient evidence" to charge him with an offence under the 1925 Act.

Smith later stated that "I was totally hung out to dry by the Blair regime" and that he had been driven to the brink of suicide.

== Drink-driving ==
Smith pleaded guilty to a drink-driving offence on 25 July 2006. After he had crashed his car, he was found to be almost three times over the drink-drive limit. Smith was banned from driving for three years, fined £1,800, and ordered to attend a drink-impaired drivers' course and carry out 80 hours community service.
