= Cash-for-Honours scandal =

Political scandal in the United Kingdom

The Cash-for-Honours scandal (also known as Cash for Peerages, Loans for Lordships, Loans for Honours or Loans for Peerages) was a political scandal in the United Kingdom in 2006 and 2007 concerning the connection between political donations and the award of life peerages. A loophole in electoral law in the United Kingdom means that although anyone donating even small sums of money to a political party has to declare this as a matter of public record, those loaning money at commercial rates of interest did not have to make a public declaration.

In March 2006, several men nominated for life peerages by the Prime Minister, Tony Blair, were rejected by the House of Lords Appointments Commission. It was later revealed they had loaned large amounts of money to the governing Labour Party, at the suggestion of Labour fundraiser Lord Levy. Suspicion was aroused by some that the peerages were a quid pro quo for the loans. This resulted in three complaints to the Metropolitan Police by Scottish National Party MP Angus MacNeil, Plaid Cymru parliamentary leader Elfyn Llwyd and a third individual who remains unidentified, as a breach of the law against selling honours. The investigation was led by Assistant Commissioner John Yates who later resigned over the News of the World phone hacking scandal. During the investigation, members of the Labour Party (including Blair) the Conservatives and the Liberal Democrats were questioned and Levy was arrested and later released on bail. The investigation continued to have political impact, as stories leaked from the police investigation and damaged the government and Labour Party.

Following the unveiling of the scandal the Labour Party had to repay the loans and was said to be in financial difficulty. The police investigation was long and involved. It expanded to encompass potential charges of perverting the course of justice, apparently relating to suspected attempts to present evidence to the police in a particular way. At one point the Attorney General, Lord Goldsmith, obtained an injunction against the BBC, preventing them from reporting a story they claimed was in the public interest while he argued that the story was sub judice. This raised the possibility of a conflict of interest, the Attorney General being a political appointee. Tony Blair was interviewed three times as Prime Minister, though only as a witness and not under caution.

After a long review of the police file, it was reported on 20 July 2007 that the Crown Prosecution Service would not bring any charges against any of the individuals involved. Their decision stated that while peerages may have been given in exchange for loans, it could not find direct evidence that that had been agreed in advance; this would have been required for a successful prosecution. Notwithstanding the lack of charges, some considered that the investigation had severely undermined Tony Blair's position, and possibly hastened his resignation as Prime Minister.

== Background ==
Historically, hereditary peerages were awarded to members of the landowning aristocracy and royal favourites. In the late 19th century, peerages began to be awarded to industrialists with increasing frequency. Well-substantiated allegations that titles were sold during David Lloyd George's premiership led to the passing of the Honours (Prevention of Abuses) Act 1925. In the second half of the 20th century the granting of hereditary peerages, other than to members of the Royal Family, virtually ceased, giving way to life peerages, which have been granted since the passing of the Life Peerages Act 1958. They are given to a wide range of individuals on the recommendation of the leaders of the major British political parties, including opposition parties.

In May 1998, the then Chairman of the Political Honours Scrutiny Committee, former Conservative Cabinet Minister Lord Pym, told a House of Commons Select Committee that the committee considered a political donation a point in a nominee's favour as it indicated involvement in public life, and that the nominee had "put their money where his mouth is". The House of Lords Appointments Commission was established in 2000 to check the suitability of those nominated for an honour.

In the summer of 2005, a list of 28 people nominated for working peerages was prepared. The list contained 11 Labour nominees, eight Conservatives, five Liberal Democrats, three members of the Democratic Unionist Party and one member of the Ulster Unionist Party. The list was referred to the Appointments Commission in the usual way. Publication of the list was delayed and stories began to appear in the press stating that the Commission had concerns about some of those nominated on grounds of their large donations to political parties. Some of the Labour peers appointed became known as Tony's Cronies. In February 2006, stockbroker Barry Townsley, who had donated £6,000 (and loaned £1 million on commercial terms) to the Labour Party and contributed £1.5 m to a City Academy under a government scheme, withdrew his acceptance on the grounds of press intrusion into his private life.

Townsley, who was the subject of an investigation by the Serious Fraud Office, was followed by property millionaire Sir David Garrard, who withdrew his name in March 2006. Sir Gulam Noon, the British-Indian food company millionaire, was also nominated by the Labour Party after having made donations and loaned money (he also had his nomination rejected by the Appointments Commission). Sir Gulam told The Times newspaper a "senior party man" told him "there was no reason why I should declare this loan because it was refundable". "I was told by this same person that because there was interest on the loan it was a commercial matter and would not come under the same party funding rules as a donation."

The list of working peers, minus the withdrawn and queried names, was published on 10 April 2006.

== Chai Patel ==
On 8 March 2006, Chai Patel, director of the Priory healthcare group, who had donated £100,000 to the Labour Party complained that he was being rejected by the Commission. He said "It is a fact that I have donated, but what is being implicated is that I would be rewarded with a peerage. I have never asked for any favour for the money that I have donated. My children suggested that if I had not given this money, I would not be seen in this light. But I happen to support this Government. I gave money to the party because I happen to believe in what it stands for. I can't change what has happened." Patel stated that he had asked a Queen's Counsel for advice on whether his human rights were being abused by the Commission.

On 29 March 2006, Patel withdrew his name from the list of nominees for a peerage. He said that at no time did he have any expectation of a reward nor had he been offered anything in return, yet on a BBC Today programme he expressed the view that he wanted to serve in the Upper House (the Lords) as he felt that his life experience ensured that he could make a valuable contribution there. He has also stated in a letter to the House of Lords Appointments Commission that "I feel that, given my accumulated experience and deep sense of public service, as well as being able to devote the time to undertake the responsibility effectively, I would be able to make a contribution to the parliamentary process."

== Loans ==
On 12 March 2006, the Sunday Times reported that shortly before being told that he would receive a peerage, Patel had been asked to change a donation to the Labour Party he was planning to make into an unsecured loan. On 26 March 2006, The Independent confirmed that it was Lord Levy who had asked Patel to switch using this unsecured loan approach. He agreed and loaned £1.5 m to the party, telling them that he would be prepared to change the loan into a donation at some point in the future. Over the next few days stories were printed which stated that the Labour Party had borrowed £3.5 million from private individuals during 2005, the year of a general election. It was subsequently revealed that a total of £13.95 million had been loaned by wealthy individuals to support Labour's election campaign. The figures released mean the bulk of the £17.94 m the party spent on its general election campaign was paid for by loans from individuals. The terms of the loans were confidential.

Loans made on commercial terms, at between 1% and 3% above the banking base rate as was the case here, are not subject to reporting requirements to the Electoral Commission. However the Treasurer of the Party, Jack Dromey, stated publicly that neither he nor Labour's elected National Executive Committee chairman Sir Jeremy Beecham had knowledge of or involvement in the loans and had only become aware when he read about it in the newspapers. Dromey stated that he was regularly consulted about conventional bank loans. As well as announcing his own investigation he called on the Electoral Commission to investigate the issue of political parties taking out loans from non-commercial sources.

Tribune reported that Dromey had intended to reveal his inquiry exclusively in the Labour-oriented magazine later that week, but having heard that Tony Blair intended to announce an inquiry the following day, toured television studios on the evening of 15 March 2006 announcing his inquiry (video). Dromey feared he would be blamed for the debts by an inquiry organised by 10 Downing Street (Tribune, 24 March 2006, p. 5). Dromey's announcement created much media interest to which Blair had to respond to at his monthly press conference the next day. Blair said he wanted to shake up of the honours system and improve the rules covering party funding.

The affair centred on two aspects of Labour's political fund raising activities. First, to what degree was there a tacit or implied relationship between the large scale donors and their subsequent recognition via the honours system? Second, the rules on party funding (applicable to all political parties in the UK) require that anyone donating £5,000 or more must be named – but loans of any amount do not have to be declared provided they are made on commercial terms. This loophole raises accusations of undue secrecy and potentially calls into question the probity of those involved in procurement and handling of such large and anonymous sums, particularly when the elected party treasurer was unaware of the existence of the loans.

Lord Levy, a close friend of Tony Blair (who was the Prime Minister's personal envoy to the Middle East, as well as tennis partner), had raised funds for Labour and was identified in the press as a key figure in arranging the loans and on 17 March 2006 it was announced that the Public Administration Select Committee of the House of Commons had invited him to give evidence on political financing. Committee chairman Tony Wright said:

"With continuing speculation about whether the system of scrutiny is sufficiently robust and as part of our wider inquiry into current standards of probity in public life, we will be hearing from those charged with scrutinising nominations to ensure that there are robust safeguards against honours for sale."

Another issue was repayment: the Labour Party owed about £14 m before the election. The interest on the loans amounted to £900,000 a year and some of the loans had to be repaid within months, either through further borrowing or gifts. In these circumstances, one unanswered question concerned why Lord Levy asked for loans rather than gifts.

It was disclosed on 25 March 2006 that the only persons privy to details of the loans were Tony Blair, Lord Levy and Matt Carter.

On 25 March 2006 it was revealed that Scotland Yard had requested that parliament halt the Public Administration Select Committee hearing with four of the peerage nominees, Sir David Garrard, Sir Gulam Noon, and Chai Patel, Barry Townsley as it could prejudice the criminal investigation. The assistant commissioner, John Yates asked for the parliamentary investigation to be postponed.

The Guardian revealed that many of the people who had made loans to the Labour Party had been major donors to charities with which Lord Levy had been involved, namely, the Community Service Volunteers, Jewish Care and the NSPCC. Sir David Garrard, Andrew Rosenfeld, and Barry Townsley are patrons of Jewish Care; Richard Caring, proprietor of the Ivy in London, had raised £10 m for the NSPCC, and Sir David Garrard, Dr. Chai Patel, Andrew Rosenfeld, Richard Caring, and Derek Tullett are all connected to the Community Service Volunteers.

In July 2006 it was reported that Lord Levy had allegedly told Sir Gulam Noon, a businessman nominated for a peerage, that he need not tell the Lords vetting committee about a loan to the Labour party. On 20 April 2005 Noon had agreed to lend Labour £250,000 on commercial terms, which he did on 28 April. Noon had originally offered to make a donation of between £50,000 and £75,000 but Levy wanted £1 m. They then negotiated a loan. A letter sent to Sir Gulam at this time by Labour said that his £250,000 loan was not "reportable" under relevant legislation. On 3 October 2006, Sir Gulam was informed by a Labour official that the prime minister was nominating him for a peerage. On 4 October 2006, Sir Gulam received the nomination forms for joining the House of Lords. These asked him to list his contributions to Labour. Sir Gulam gave the papers to his accountant, who put down the £250,000 on the form along with just over £220,000 of straight donations he had made since 2000. On 5 October 2006 Lord Levy told Sir Gulam that he need not have included the £250,000 on the papers sent to the Lords Appointments Commission, because it was not a donation. Sir Gulam retrieved the papers and submitted a revised document that made no mention of the £250,000. In March 2006, the Lords Appointments Commission found out about the loan. Its chairman, Lord Stevenson, then wrote to the prime minister asking that Sir Gulam's nomination for a peerage be withdrawn.

=== Labour Party loans ===
On 20 March 2006 the Labour Party issued the full list of 12 lenders, together with the sums involved:

Rod Aldridge – £1 million – former Executive Chairman of Capita
Richard Caring – £2 million – owner of The Ivy, London
Gordon Crawford – £500,000 – Chairman of London Bridge Software
Sir Christopher Evans – £1 million – Founder of Merlin Biosciences
Sir David Garrard – £2.3 million
Nigel Morris – £1 million – co-Founder of Capital One and Director of The Economist Group
Sir Gulam Noon – £250,000 – Chairman of Noon Products Ltd
Chai Patel – £1.5 million
Andrew Rosenfeld – £1 million – Chairman of Minerva plc
David Sainsbury, Baron Sainsbury of Turville – £2 million – Government Minister
Barry Townsley – £1 million – Chairman of Insinger Townsley
Derek Tullett – £400,000 –

Total: £13,950,000

One of the lenders, Lord Sainsbury of Turville was, until November 2006, a government minister. Initially Lord Sainsbury incorrectly announced that he had reported the loan to the Department of Trade and Industry's Permanent Secretary. He later apologised for unintentionally misleading the public by confusing disclosures about a donation of £2 m with the loan for the same amount which in fact he had not reported. He faces an investigation by Sir John Bourn, head of the National Audit Office, for a possible breach of the ministerial code.

=== Conservative Party loans ===
On 31 March 2006 the Conservative Party published a list of 13 wealthy individuals and companies to whom it owed a total of £15.95 million:

Henry Angest – £550,000 – Chairman and Chief Executive of the Arbuthnot Banking Group PLC
Michael Ashcroft, Baron Ashcroft – £3.6 million
Cringle Corporation – £450,000
Dame Vivien Duffield – £250,000
Johan Eliasch – £2.6 million
Graham Facks-Martin – £50,000
Michael Hintze – £2.5 m – owner of CQS Management
Irvine Laidlaw, Baron Laidlaw – £3.5 million
Alan Lewis – £100,000
Raymond Richards (deceased) – £1 million
Victoria, Lady de Rothschild – £1 million
Leonard Steinberg, Baron Steinberg – £250,000
Charles Wigoder – £100,000 – Chief Executive of Telecom Plus

Total: £15,950,000

The identity of 10 backers it had repaid – including a number of foreign nationals – was not revealed. These loans had totalled £5 million. Some of these lenders were concerned not to reveal their identity fearing that it might compromise their existing business arrangements with the government. Their details, including one foreign backer, will be provided "in confidence" to the Electoral Commission. Initially the party had sought not to disclose to anyone the names of two lenders who requested confidentiality.

The party had an outstanding £16 million bank loan and £4.7 million was owed to local Conservative Party associations.

The Electoral Commission welcomed the decision to publish the list – but said it had written to the party asking for more details on the loan terms.

== Criminal investigation ==
Corrupt procurement and award of honours is legislated against by the Honours (Prevention of Abuses) Act 1925 and the Public Bodies Corrupt Practices Act 1889 and the Metropolitan Police investigated the three complaints that they had received under these Acts. The police are also investigating whether false declarations were made to the Electoral Commission, which is an offence under the Political Parties, Elections and Referendums Act 2000. On 27 March they gave MPs more details of its inquiry into the complaints and the Public Administration Select Committee agreed to postpone its hearing on this issue in order not to prejudice possible police action. The criminal inquiry and the Electoral Commission investigation both stretch back to 2001.

6 April 2006 – Electoral Commission announced that its own investigation was to be suspended until the police completed their inquiries. The Electoral Commission was not satisfied that election funding laws had not been breached.

=== Metropolitan Police investigation ===
- 13 April 2006 – The Metropolitan Police arrested former government adviser Desmond Smith under the Honours (Prevention of Abuses) Act. Smith, headteacher of All Saints Catholic School and Technology College, was a council member of the Specialist Schools and Academies Trust, which helped the government recruit sponsors for the City Academy programme. Lord Levy was the President of The Council of the Specialist Schools and Academies Trust.
- 12 July 2006 – Lord Levy was arrested by the Metropolitan Police in connection with the enquiry.
- 20 September 2006 – Businessman Christopher Evans was arrested by police in connection with the enquiry.
- 22 November 2006 – The police questioned a serving Cabinet minister, for the first time, as a witness in the investigation, Secretary of State for Health Patricia Hewitt.
- 14 December 2006 – Police questioned Prime Minister Tony Blair at Downing Street as a witness; he was not arrested or interviewed under caution.
- 15 December 2006 – Police questioned Jack McConnell, the First Minister of Scotland.
- January 2007 – Police questioned, under caution, John McTernan, the Director of Political Operations at 10 Downing Street seconded to the Scottish Labour Party to run its campaign for the Scottish Parliament general election of 3 May 2007.
- 19 January 2007 – Ruth Turner, Director of Government Relations at 10 Downing Street, was arrested by police under the Honours (Prevention of Abuses) Act and also on suspicion of perverting the course of justice. She was later released on bail. She was the first salaried Government official to be arrested in the inquiry, which followed a search of 10 Downing Street's computer systems by an independent IT expert.
- 26 January 2007 – Prime Minister Tony Blair was questioned in Downing Street for a second time—once again, as a witness and not under caution. At the request of police the 45-minute interview was not publicly revealed until 1 February 2007, for what they described as "operational reasons". A Metropolitan Police spokesperson stated that Blair was only being "interviewed as a witness" but declined to state whether the interview related to alleged breaches of the Honours (Prevention of Abuses) Act or alleged perversion of the course of justice. However, on 25 June 2007 Channel 4 news reported that the police had originally asked for an interview under caution, and that Blair had said that this would require him to resign as Prime Minister. The police had then re-considered and interviewed him as a witness, rather than suspect.
- 30 January 2007 – Lord Levy was arrested again on suspicion of conspiracy to pervert the course of justice, while still on bail from the previous arrest. He was subsequently bailed.
- 7 February 2007 – The Crown Prosecution Service confirmed that head teacher Des Smith will not face any charges.
- 20 February 2007 – On reporting to a police station under her bail terms, Ruth Turner was interviewed for a second time and re-bailed.
- 2 March 2007 – The Attorney General, Lord Goldsmith obtained an injunction to prevent the BBC from broadcasting a story about the investigation, relating to an email that the BBC had seen.
- 5 March 2007 – After a request to the Attorney General, the BBC was allowed to reveal that the email was sent by Number 10 aide Ruth Turner to Tony Blair's chief of staff, Jonathan Powell, and concerned Labour's chief fundraiser Lord Levy The BBC were still not allowed to reveal the contents of the email.
- 6 March 2007 – After both the police and the attorney general failed to obtain an injunction, The Guardian newspaper revealed that the police had shifted their focus from whether there was an effort to sell peerages to whether there has been a conspiracy to pervert the course of justice. It emerged that Turner and Levy had a meeting in 2006, an account of which was passed by her lawyers to the police, and the police were seeking clarification of whether Levy had asked Turner to "shape" the evidence she gave to Scotland Yard. On the same day, the Daily Telegraph newspaper revealed that Ruth Turner had not actually sent the email, because she feared it would be damaging if it fell into the wrong hands. Later in the day the BBC got the injunction against them lifted, and confirmed that their story was similar in substance to that published in The Guardian.
- 20 April 2007 – The police sent their file on the investigation to the Crown Prosecution Service.
- 5 June 2007 – Lord Levy and Ruth Turner were re-bailed in connection with the inquiry.
- 26 June 2007 – On the day before Tony Blair left office The Telegraph reports that American actress Courtney Coventry was flown into the UK at taxpayers expense to give evidence in the Cash for Honours investigation.
- 28 June 2007 – The day after Tony Blair left office as Prime Minister it was reported that the police had interviewed him a third time some time in early June, and again not under caution.
- 23 October 2007 – PASC questioned Assistant Commissioner Yates regarding the expenditure of the Metropolitan Police Commission during the Cash for Honours Investigation and the lack of subsequent charges.

=== Crown Prosecution Service assessment ===
The Metropolitan Police team, investigating the affair and led by Assistant Commissioner John Yates handed its main file on the cash for peerages inquiry to the Crown Prosecution Service (CPS) on Friday 20 April. Under English law, it is up to the CPS to decide whether to bring charges against any of the 136 people interviewed.

On 4 June 2007 the CPS asked the police to undertake further enquiries, following reports that the police were pressing for Tony Blair to be called as a prosecution witness in any trial.

On 7 July 2007 the CPS confirmed that they had all the information they needed from the police to decide whether to bring any charges, and it was confirmed that the new Attorney General, Baroness Scotland, would take no role in the case, to avoid the appearance of political influence.

On 20 July 2007 the BBC reported that the CPS would bring no charges. The CPS stated, in its reasoning for this decision, that "If one person makes an offer, etc., in the hope or expectation of being granted an honour, or in the belief that it might put him/her in a more favourable position when nominations are subsequently being considered, that does not of itself constitute an offence. Conversely, if one person grants, etc., an honour to another in recognition of (in effect, as a reward for) the fact that that other has made a gift, etc., that does not of itself constitute an offence. For a case to proceed, the prosecution must have a realistic prospect of being able to prove that the two people agreed that the gift, etc., was in exchange for an honour," and that "There is no direct evidence of any such agreement between any two people subject of this investigation"

== Connection with education funding ==
Desmond Smith was the subject of a Sunday Times investigation, which led to his resignation from the Specialist Schools and Academies Trust. At that time a Downing Street spokesman said "It's nonsense to suggest that honours are awarded for giving money to an academy.". This was later contradicted when it was confirmed that the "citations" explaining the case for putting Sir David Garrard and Barry Townsley in the House of Lords "prominently" featured their role in helping academy schools. Downing Street sources said the Prime Minister wanted their political support in the Lords for the controversial policy, adding that the Prime Minister felt that anyone who gave their time, commitment and money to establish an academy – to help children in previously failing schools – "had a strong claim to be considered for an honour". "What we wanted was people with expertise in academies as working peers, taking the Labour whip, who could actively contribute with a massive amount of knowledge to the debate on education in the House of Lords."

Garrard gave £2.4 m for an academy in Bexley, south London. Townsley gave £1.5 m for another in west London.

== Political reaction ==
There was widespread support for an enquiry and some calls to revise the process of party political funding.

=== Labour Party ===
==== Tony Blair ====
Speaking at his monthly news briefing on 16 March 2006, Tony Blair confirmed his knowledge of the loans but denied any connection between the large loans from three private individuals and whether they were subsequently nominated for honours. Blair said all three men were known party donors and would have made excellent Labour "working peers". He suggested that further changes to the honours system might be needed.

When questioned, the PM said he did not think Dromey had revealed details of his lack of involvement in the handling of the private loans to undermine or implicate either the PM or 10 Downing Street. Dromey's very public expression of concern – he toured various television channels to be interviewed on the matter – raised suspicion among some supporters of Blair that his actions were deliberately designed to embarrass the Prime Minister and consequently benefit Prime Minister in-waiting Chancellor Gordon Brown. Dromey denied this, saying he had been forced to go public when his persistent questioning failed to satisfactorily resolve the matter.

The police were reported as pressing for Blair to be called as a prosecution witness in any trial according to reports on 3 June 2007.

==== Charles Clarke ====
Also on 16 March 2006 the then Home Secretary stated "The treasurer should know about all the fundraising issues that arise."

However, he later called into question Dromey's competence, saying he had "serious questions about Jack Dromey's capacity" as Labour treasurer and the fact Dromey did not know about the loans meant "you have to wonder how well he was doing his work" finally adding, "I don't know why Jack behaved as he did." He rejected as "nonsense" a suggestion that the treasurer had spoken publicly about the loans to speed up the transition of power from Blair to Chancellor Gordon Brown.

==== Sir Jeremy Beecham ====
Sir Jeremy Beecham, chairman of Labour's governing body, the National Executive Committee (NEC), accused Charles Clarke of speaking out of turn and defended party treasurer Jack Dromey. He said the treasurer "shouldn't be criticised" and had "acted perfectly properly". It was "absolutely clear that the reasons that NEC officers, including the elected party treasurer, did not know about the loans had nothing to do with any failings on their part". He added: "Jack Dromey has always carried out his responsibilities with great diligence and retained the absolute confidence of the NEC in ensuring that this issue is dealt with." In an interview on BBC2's Newsnight he said Clarke had not read the situation correctly. "I don't know how closely Charles has been involved in all this. He's not been on the National Executive for a number of years. I wouldn't have said it in Charles Clarke's position."

==== Harriet Harman ====
In a measure aimed to avoid any conflict of interest, Dromey's wife Harriet Harman – a minister in the Department for Constitutional Affairs – relinquished her responsibilities for overseeing electoral reform and House of Lords reform.

==== Diane Abbott ====
Writing of Dromey's reaction in The Times of 17 March 2006, left-wing Labour MP Diane Abbott said:

"But perhaps Mr Dromey is furious because he has seen things that have not yet been made public. Perhaps facts have finally been revealed to him about new Labour's inner circle and their adventures in influence-peddling and in the world of the super-rich that he really did not know before. And the enormity of what he has discovered may have made him determined that whoever else may be swept away in the ensuing scandal, it will not be him."

==== Clare Short ====
Former cabinet minister and Blair critic Clare Short described the issue with characteristic bluntness:

"What we're getting is a bubble of these clever people who've captured the state, don't need a party, don't need any members, don't have turbulent people having opinions, who then get money from rich people and run our state without consulting anyone else."

==== Ian McCartney ====
The Labour Party chairman Ian McCartney defended the loans with the BBC quoting him as saying:

"Bear in mind too that we fought the 2005 election in the face of a very heavily funded Conservative campaign – a large part of which was reportedly funded by loans, and targeted at individual Labour MPs."

On 31 March 2006 McCartney said the Conservative Party still looked like they had "something to hide" by not revealing the identity of their foreign lenders. "We need to know who these people are, where they reside, where they pay tax, how much they lent and on what terms. "It is not up to the Tories to claim that they did not breach the law. That's the job of the Electoral Commission. "By failing to provide these details the Conservatives and David Cameron are fuelling suspicion that they have even more to hide."

==== John Prescott ====
John Prescott, the Deputy Prime Minister, told the BBC that he was "not happy" he found out about the millions loaned to the Labour Party by reading it in the papers but insisted the loans would later appear in the party's audited accounts. He refused to give a guarantee that Labour had not given peerages for loans, saying "I am bound to say not all the information possibly is out yet and we are still looking at it."

Prescott said he favoured a change to state funding but also said he would not rule out the suggestion that private loans should be capped: "There's a kind of unhealthy approach to political financing in this country. What we need to do is have a healthy debate."

Prescott himself became involved in accusations of influence peddling when newspapers suggested he had made planning decisions in favour of Minerva plc, a company chaired at various times by two of the lenders involved, Sir David Garrard and Andrew Rosenfeld. He told BBC One's The Politics Show he did not "know anything" about the firm or secret loans to the party.

He said he had received the planning requirements for a skyscraper in London and the Park Place shopping centre in Croydon but felt the decision could be made locally. "I passed it over to Croydon and City of London Corporation. They made the decision, not me. It's quite untrue to say there was a deal or I made the decision."

Of Garrard and Rosenfeld he said, "I don't think I have ever met them. I don't know who the companies are and I certainly don't know if they were giving money to the Labour Party. I am not a great one for circulating among businessmen. I just do my damn job and therefore I resent it when these implications are made. I have not made any money from politics for God's sake. But I am here doing what I can best in public service. My reputation is important to me. My politics is important to me."

"I make my mistakes from time to time and we have to be answerable to you guys but not when it's a lie," he added.

==== Lord Falconer of Thoroton ====
Amendments to the Electoral Administration Act to make it a legal requirement that loans to political parties are made public in a similar way to donations were to be urgently considered by Lord Falconer of Thoroton, then Lord Chancellor according to reports in March 2006.

=== Conservative Party ===
==== David Cameron ====
"We've got to stop this perception that parties can somehow be bought by big donations either from very rich people, or trade unions, or businesses."

The Conservative Party admitted that it has engaged in similar borrowing (but did not reveal any links to nominations for peerages). Such loans have been reported in party accounts though the annual accounts are not yet published for the period covering the 2005 general election.

David Cameron's proposals are:

Ban on all loans unless from financial institutions on fully commercial terms
£50,000 cap on donations
Tax relief on donations up to £3,000
State funding of £1.20 per vote won at general elections for parties with MPs, plus annual payment equal to 60p per vote
New commission to handle honours
General election party funds limited to £15 m

These proposals would also reduce the number of MPs from 650 to fewer than 600.

==== Francis Maude ====
Conservative Party chairman Francis Maude said he "regretted" accepting loans from abroad but insisted it had not broken the law. He said it had to pay back £5m to lenders who wanted to remain anonymous including a number of foreign nationals.

"These loans represent a very small part of our financial backing – I wish we had not done so but we have and we have now set the record clear we have repaid those loans and the matter is perfectly clear," Mr Maude told BBC Radio 5 Live. "It would clearly have been better if we had not as things turn out but that's the way it is." He insisted the Tories had done nothing wrong and that Labour had been "much less transparent about this whole process than we have."

He said he was "very proud" of the people who lent money to the Tories and insisted they had not supported the party out of "self-interest" because, he argued, it had not stood much of a chance of gaining power in recent years.

=== Liberal Democrats ===
==== Sir Menzies Campbell ====
Former Liberal Democrat leader Sir Menzies Campbell said that his party had not nominated anyone for a peerage who had loaned it large sums. He said the Lib Dems received loans from three people in the period before the 2005 General Election and had declared their names and the sums lent. He urged transparency on funding, and suggested a £50,000 cap on donations by individuals and a reduction in maximum permitted party election spending from £20 m to £15 m:

"There should be no secret loans of any kind, and if the lord chancellor is proposing that in legislation currently before Parliament, that's something we will most certainly support."

== Previous instances ==
The expression "cash for peerages" has a long history. Titles have constantly been granted to court favourites and allies. James I was more overt; he created the title of baronet and sold them for £1,500 each to raise money for his war in Ireland.

In the 1920s David Lloyd George was involved in a barely concealed "cash for patronage" scandal managed by Maundy Gregory, which resulted in the 1925 Act which barred this (purchase of peerages had not been illegal).

In 1976 Harold Wilson's resignation honours list was similarly embroiled in what became known as the "Lavender List" (supposedly hand-written on lavender paper by Marcia Williams). This, though widely deemed to include some unsuitable and unsalubrious nominees, rewarded Wilson's friends and carried no suggestion of overt reward for money – given or loaned. Lord Kagan, ennobled in the Lavender List, was convicted of fraud in 1980 – for some years he had been funding Harold Wilson's Leader's office. Sir Eric Miller, knighted in the Lavender List, committed suicide in 1977 while under investigation for fraud; he too had helped fund Harold Wilson's Leader's office.

In the 1960s, Roy Thomson had some justifiable claim to a peerage as a Canadian and later British publisher. As even his company history observes, "Roy had noted that all proprietors of newspapers seemed to become members of the House of Lords. He had also noted this was emphatically 'a good thing'" and he showed himself ready to do whatever was required to achieve this goal, believing at first that it could be a simple open purchase but moving on to explicit lobbying of prime ministers. He contributed money to charitable bodies which were deemed to improve his chances. Eventually, having bought The Scotsman, The Sunday Times and later The Times, he became sufficiently important to Harold Wilson that he was given a hereditary peerage as Baron Thomson of Fleet.

As recently as 2004 the issue of large donations to a political party being linked to the award of a peerage arose when Paul Drayson donated £500,000 to the Labour Party. His company, Powderject (now part of Novartis), had also received a valuable government contract to make vaccines.

== See also ==
- List of political scandals in the United Kingdom
- Reform of the House of Lords
- Cash-for-questions affair
- Cash for access
- Cash for influence
- Political funding in the United Kingdom
- David Abrahams
- Tony's Cronies
