= Minerva (property firm) =

Minerva plc is a London-based British developer and property company co-founded by Sir David Garrard and Andrew Rosenfeld. Garrard and Rosenfeld took the company public in 1996 and subsequently left the business. Minerva returned to private ownership in 2011, on being acquired in a joint venture by clients of Delancey and Ares Management.

== Projects ==
Minerva has delivered various major projects, such as The Walbrook and the St Botolph Building, and has attempted some internationally significant projects including the rejected Minerva Building in the City of London.

== Controversies ==
The Minerva Building and Minerva's planned Park Place shopping and office development and its previous ownership of the Allders chain of department stores, both in Croydon, came under scrutiny amidst the 2006 Cash for Peerages political scandal, when it emerged that the Labour government had chosen not to intervene over the Minerva Building and Park Place planning decisions or the state of Allders' pension fund shortly after both Garrard and Rosenfeld had made major loans and donations to the Labour Party.
