= The People's Operator =

British mobile virtual network operator

The People's Operator LLP
- Type: Limited liability partnership
- Industry: Telecommunications
- Founded: 19 November 2012
- Defunct: 26 February 2019
- Fate: Defunct
- Headquarters: London, United Kingdom
- Key people: Sam Tillotson (Acting CEO), Michael Butler ( chairman)
- Products: Mobile telephony
- Website: thepeoplesoperator.com tpo.com

The People's Operator (or TPO Mobile) was a mobile virtual network operator that provided mobile phone services in the United Kingdom via Three (though TPO had initially selected EE), and in the United States via the Sprint and T-Mobile networks. It was launched in 2012, with the stated aim of being an ethical mobile network operator. TPO said that their service gave private customers the opportunity to support good causes, charities, nonprofits, "progressive organisations" or "ethical groups" of their choice and receive updates on how their money was being spent, while businesses could fulfill their corporate social responsibility commitments. The company's stock lost nearly 90 percent in value in the year and a half after its launch. Trading of The People's Operator stock on the London exchange was suspended in July 2018, after the company failed to provide its 2017 financial reports. In December 2018, the company received a cash infusion from the holding company that was majority owner of Lycamobile. On 13 February 2019, TPO announced it had entered administration; its stock ceased trading on 26 February 2019.

== History ==
=== Start-up ===
TPO was launched on 19 November 2012. At launch, it was owned entirely by its three co-founders, Andrew Rosenfeld, Tom Gutteridge and Mark Epstein, with Rosenfeld being the primary financial backing for the company. The organisation has been based in Shoreditch, London. It was established with the stated aim of being an ethical mobile phone operator. At launch, Rosenfeld was the Chairman, with Gutteridge and Epstein as vice-chairs, and Alex Franks as the chief executive. In mid-2013, they launched a range of a range of 30-day rolling pay monthly SIM-only deals.

=== Partnership with Jimmy Wales, going public, and leadership change ===
On 20 January 2014, TPO announced that Jimmy Wales had joined the organisation on a £250,000 annual salary as co-chair of the board, and had "taken a strategic stake in the business." Wales was quoted as saying that "TPO has huge potential for viral growth and the more it grows, the more money will pass to the people and communities that need it." TPO announced in January 2014 that it was aiming to launch its services in the United States and Europe within the next 12 months. Only weeks after Jimmy Wales joining the executive team, The Guardian reported in an interview with Wales that Wikipedia's article about the company had been written by a marketing consultant for the People's Operator, indicating the problem "with commerce entering Wikipedia". One financial reporter described the addition of Jimmy Wales as "not the greatest argument for backing a company".

In October 2014, the company announced that it intended to list publicly on London's Alternative Investment Market. It was estimated by Oscar Williams-Grut that the company could be worth £100 million upon its initial public offering. This was later described as a "hugely overblown price".

On 8 February 2015, Rosenfeld died after a short illness. Days later, Wales was appointed by the board as Rosenfeld's replacement as Executive Chairman. In October 2015, it was announced that Rosenfeld's son James had been appointed as a non-executive director of the firm, but less than 13 months later, James resigned from the position.

In January 2017, the company announced that Jimmy Wales would be replaced as board Chairman by Michael Butler, who has industry experience primarily with Inmarsat. Butler was to be paid with 2 million new shares of the company, carved from a 4 million-share subscription proposed by the company, pending approval by the AIM stock market. After Wales left and US operations were put up for sale, trading of The People's Operator stock on the London Stock Exchange was suspended on 2 July 2018, because the company had failed to release its 2017 financial reports.

=== United States expansion and collapse in share price ===
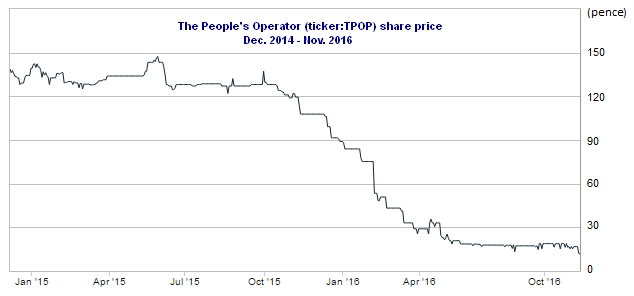
Line chart showing the fall in value from £1,30 to less than £0,12. Shareholders lost nearly £90 million.

TPO officially launched in the United States on 21 July 2015. Since its inception, the service runs as an MVNO on top of the Sprint wireless CDMA network, and later also on the T-Mobile US wireless GSM network, which started the week of 21 March 2016. TPO offered prospective US customers a $32-per-month option with unlimited talk time and text messages and 2 gigabytes of data.

In late September 2015, the company reported its financial performance through the first six months of the year, revealing it had significantly widened its pretax loss to £4,400,000 from a year-earlier loss of only £600,000.

Between October 2015 and March 2016, the company saw a collapse in its share price from 130p to below 30p. The Times ran a June 2016 story noting that it has dropped nearly 90 percent since its initial offering. By November 2016, the financial numbers were "not adding up" for TPO, with the company's directors and major shareholders previously indicating a desire to inject £1 million into the company if other shareholders were prepared to do the same. But that proposal was vetted at 16.7 pence per share, then the stock lost another 60% of value, slumping to 6.5p. The sunken share price was said to be "due to disappointing growth in the UK and the US."

== Services ==
As a mobile virtual network operator, TPO did not own any network infrastructure, but instead used the Three (previously EE) network to provide its services in the United Kingdom (although it did not initially disclose which network it would use), and the Sprint and T-Mobile networks in the United States. It used the virtual network aggregator Transatel to connect to the EE network.

Since it was launched, TPO offered pay-as-you-go services. The organisation did not have stores, operating entirely online, but it had an in-house call centre in the UK.

At launch in the UK, the costs of calls and texts were deemed competitive with other mobile phone operators, costing 12.5p/minute for calls (with free calls between TPO users), 7.5p/text and 12.5p/MB for data. It was noted that the company may need to offer a better data rate, which was later halved. TPO started offering monthly contracts in April 2013, at prices between £5 and £25. In October 2013 they launched an "unlimited everything" package for £14.99.

The People's Operator announced that it would be moving to the Three UK network in the first quarter of 2016, which would give its customers LTE 4G services.

== The People's Operator Foundation ==
Initial plans were for 25% of any TPO profit to have gone to The People's Operator Foundation, which was an independent group that would have funded charities and community groups in the UK. However, the company has never been profitable, and the Foundation was dissolved at the end of 2014. TPO Foundation was a registered charity, and as of 2012 the trustees were Sir Christopher Kelly (chair), Kevin Curley, and (the now deceased) Andrew Rosenfeld.

In addition, customers could optionally designate 10% of the amount they spend on calls, texts and data (pre-VAT) to a specific charity or community group. 10% of all their employees' spend went to good causes in this way in 2013. However, according to company filings, less than 3.8% of gross income (not 10% as advertised) was actually distributed to nominated causes. This is likely due to a $50 minimum threshold for any charity to receive a disbursement.

Organisations that sign up new customers to TPO also may receive 10% of the customer's call, text and data spend. In order to maintain price competitiveness with other networks, this 10% was to have come from TPO's marketing budget.

TPO established partnerships with NSPCC, The Trussell Trust, Dimbleby Cancer Care and Childline prior to its launch, and by April 2013 it had partnered with the Children’s Heart Foundation, RE:generate and Caxton House, and was planning a partnership with The Big Issue Foundation. In September 2013, the Labour Party also announced a partnership with TPO; according to Wired UK, party members are encouraged to "sign up to the mobile operator in order to give 10 percent of their bill back to the party." Unite the Union, a British and Irish trade union, has a similar TPO partnership. As of January 2014 TPO had also partnered with Islington Giving, and Wales hopes that the foundation will also support Wikipedia in the future.

== TPO Community ==
In 2015 The People's Operator launched its TPO Community, an advertisement-free social network. The community was established to provide users a space where they can talk about the charities and causes they support and donate to the causes directly.

== Criticism ==
In November 2013 The Daily Telegraph reported that Unite's deal with TPO included free phone calls and texts for members of its strike committee and that this capability was being used as a part of a "campaign of intimidation" against bosses at the Grangemouth Refinery. In November 2013, Rosenfeld, a Labour Party donor, denied to The Times that The People's Operator "had aided Unite in dirty tricks campaigns during industrial disputes."

Shortly after the December 2014 initial public offering raised £20 million of new money for TPO, the company's stock was reviewed in The Telegraph, which calculated the firm's value at less than £1 million, or a mere 1.3 pence per share, yielding an "Avoid" rating. However, the review noted that House broker finnCap disagreed, placing a 250-pence target price on the shares, and expected TPO to generate £98 million revenue and pre-tax profits of £17.1 million by the end of 2016. Ultimately, finnCap was wrong, with TPO signaling 2016 revenues of only £3.6 million, which was 96% short of expectation.

TPO suffered reputational damage in 2016 after a transfer of customers from 3G to 4G service led to many of them waiting for weeks without phone service. The company's transfer was described as "omnishambles" in a report about how hundreds of customers had been forced to wait more than three weeks without phone service, and frustrations multiplied by "hour-long phone calls that [were] not answered, emails and tweets being ignored and comments on TPO’s Facebook page being deleted". Wireless industry reporter Kezia Jackson, interviewed by BBC Radio 4, stated that neither she personally nor the head of another MVNO (The Phone Co-op) had ever heard of any other phone network having such difficulty converting customers to a 4G signal.
