= David Garrard (property developer) =

British property developer (1939–2025)

Sir David Garrard
- Born: David Eardley Garrard; 12 January 1939; Streatham, London, England
- Died: 21 June 2025 (aged 86)
- Occupation: Property developer
- Known for: Co-founder, Minerva PLC

Sir David Eardley Garrard (12 January 1939 – 21 June 2025) was a British property developer.

== Background ==
David Garrard was born Streatham on 12 January 1939, the son of a Stamford Hill upholsterer. He attended Battersea Grammar School in South London. Garrard was Jewish.

Garrard was married for 47 years to Maureen, who became a director of The Garrard Family Foundation and The Garrard Academy. She died in 2011. He died on 21 June 2025, at the age of 86, following a stroke.

== Career ==
Garrard left school at 16 and joined an estate agency. He co-founded Minerva PLC with Andrew Rosenfeld, a property investment and development company, whose shares are quoted in the London Stock Exchange FTSE 250 Index, and was its chairman for many years until his retirement in March 2005. Before co-founding Minerva, Garrard worked as a financial adviser. In 2008, he set up a venture capital business with his son in law Alexander Salter, but the two fell out when Salter and Garrard's daughter divorced in 2013, leading to a High Court case.

Garrard was listed by the Sunday Times Rich List 2005 as the joint 451st richest person in the UK, with a fortune in excess of £100 million, falling to 575th with £95 million in 2009.

In 2014 Garrard was involved in a legal dispute with his former son-in-law related to an alleged attempted transfer of £2.5 million from a bank account and the appointment of Lord Mendelsohn as a director of jointly owned companies.

== Political involvement ==
=== Labour Party ===
In 2002 the first city academy under a new Labour programme, Business Academy Bexley (now Harris Garrard Academy) was opened by prime minister Tony Blair with Garrard as principal sponsor with a financial contribution of £2.5 million. Garrard chaired its governing body.

Before the 2005 General Election Garrard secretly provided the Labour Party with a loan of £2.3 million at a time when loans on commercial terms did not have to be declared, to be repaid on 28 April 2007. Following the discovery of the loan in the course of the Cash for Honours political scandal in the UK, Garrard withdrew his nomination for a peerage. The loan was extended, and Gerrard eventually called for it to be repaid in 2015, in a reaction against the election of Jeremy Corbyn as leader of the Labour Party.

In 2013, Garrard hosted a visit to Israel by eleven Labour MPs, including shadow defence secretary Jim Murphy, shadow defence minister Gemma Doyle, Labour Friends of Israel chair Anne McGuire and vice-chair Louise Ellman. He also sponsored the 2014 Labour Friends of Israel annual lunch, which included a speech by Labour leader Ed Miliband.

In 2014, Garrard donated £500,000 to the Labour Party, one of the largest private donations under Ed Miliband's leadership. This prompted criticism of "double standards" when the media reported that Garrard had placed shares in an offshore trust to avoid tax, similar to Conservative donor and co-treasurer Lord Fink, whom Labour had criticised.

Garrard left the Labour Party in March 2018 due to his unhappiness with the party's response to allegations of antisemitism. In February 2019, Garrard added that he had concerns about the nation's future should Corbyn lead the country. "From the very outset of Mr Corbyn’s leadership I had feared the ultra-Left Marxist/Socialist nature of the Labour party’s new leadership and its supporters, all of which led me to conclude that a socialist republic for our nation was what these politicians intend".

After leaving the party, he has provided funding on several occasions to Tom Watson in addition to his support for Change UK.

=== The Independent Group ===
In February 2019, Garrard provided funding to support the launch of pro-EU political group The Independent Group; the amount as reported by The Sunday Telegraph was £1.5 million.

== Honours ==
Garrard was knighted in the 2003 New Year Honours.

== Charitable activities ==
Garrard was a patron of children's charity Lifeline 4 Kids, was a trustee of the Police Foundation, and a director of the Princes Trust Business Division.

Garrard donated £2.4 million to the Bexley Business Academy (now known as the Harris Garrard Academy), a first- and second-level school, and chaired its governing body. The Business Academy Bexley was renamed the Harris Garrard Academy when it was taken over by the Harris Federation in 2017, to reflect the support Garrard had put into the academy.
