= All Saints Cathedral =

All Saints Cathedral or variations may refer to:

== United States ==
- All Saints Anglican Cathedral (Long Beach), California
- Covenant Presbyterian Church (Chicago), Illinois, formerly Cathedral of All Saints of the Polish National Catholic Church in Chicago
- All Saints Church (Amesbury, Massachusetts), the cathedral parish for the Anglican Diocese in New England
- Cathedral of All Saints (Albany, New York)
- All Saints' Cathedral (Milwaukee), Wisconsin

== Other countries ==
- All Saints Cathedral, Santa Fe, Argentina
- All Saints' Anglican Cathedral (Edmonton), Alberta, Canada
- All Saints Cathedral (Halifax, Nova Scotia), Canada
- All Saints' Cathedral, Cairo, Egypt
- Cathedral Church of All Saints, Derby, England, UK
- All Saints' Cathedral, Hong Kong
- All Saints' Cathedral, Nairobi, Kenya
- All Saints' Cathedral, Onitsha, Nigeria
- All Saints' Cathedral, Kampala, Uganda
- Cathedral Church of All Saints (St. Thomas, U.S. Virgin Islands)

== See also ==
- All Saints Church (disambiguation)
