= All Saints Cathedral, Santa Fe =

Coordinates: 31°39′24″S 60°42′38″W

All Saints Cathedral
- Catedral Metropolitana Todos los Santos de Santa Fe
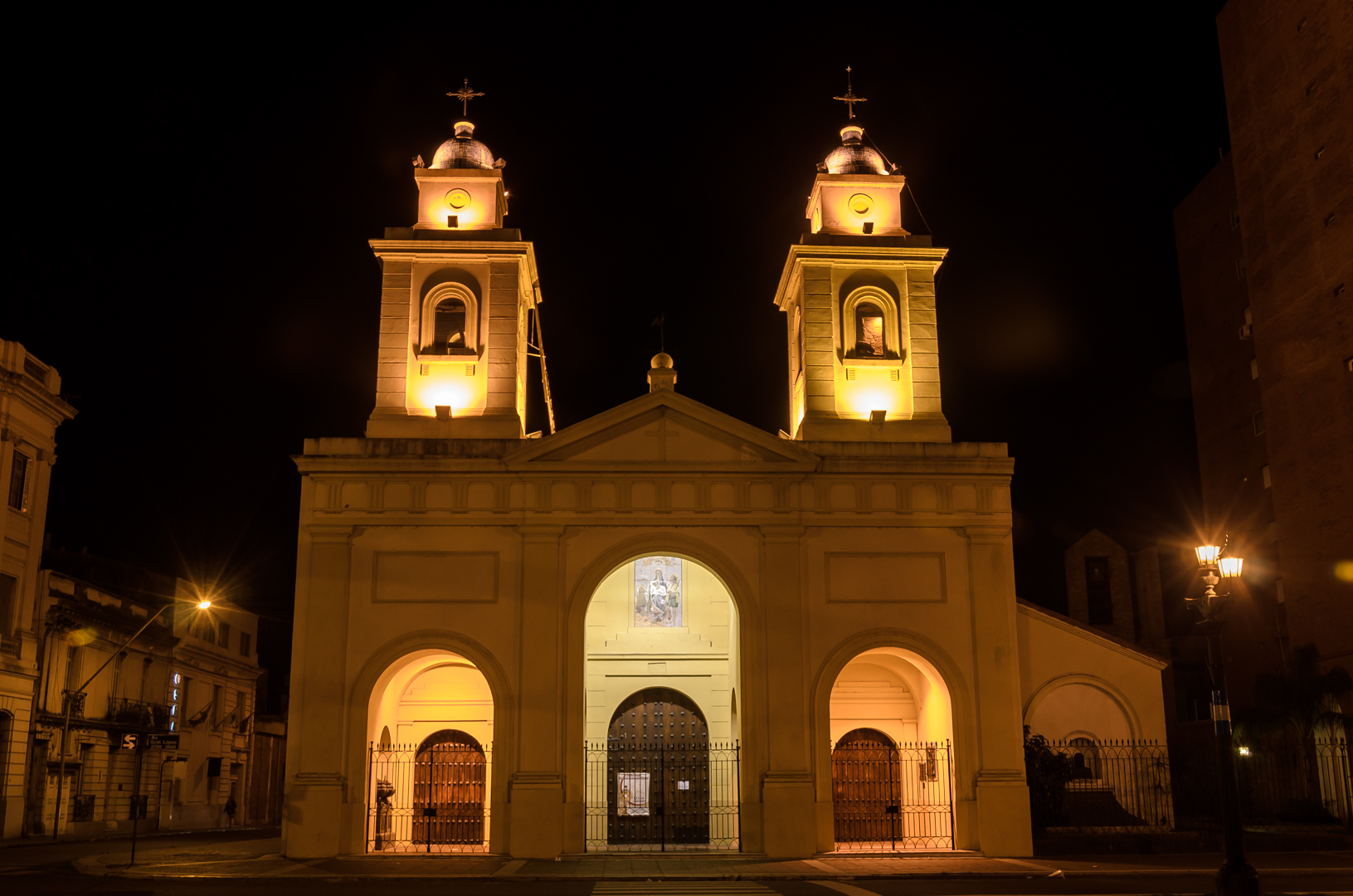
- All Saints Cathedral
- Location: Santa Fe
- Country: Argentina
- Denomination: Roman Catholic Church

The All Saints Cathedral (Spanish: Catedral Metropolitana Todos los Santos de Santa Fe), also called Santa Fe Cathedral, is the main Catholic church and, since 1934, mother church of the Archdiocese of Santa Fe de la Vera Cruz. It is located on the street Brigadier Estanislao Lopez in the city of Santa Fe, Santa Fe province, Argentina.

The building was constructed in 1573 in the old city of Santa Fe (now Cayastá). In 1651, Santa Fe was moved to its present location and the church was moved and rebuilt on its current site. It was subsequently renovated in 1833 and again in 1947, when the building’s three naves were constructed. In 1942, All Saints was declared a National Historical Monument.

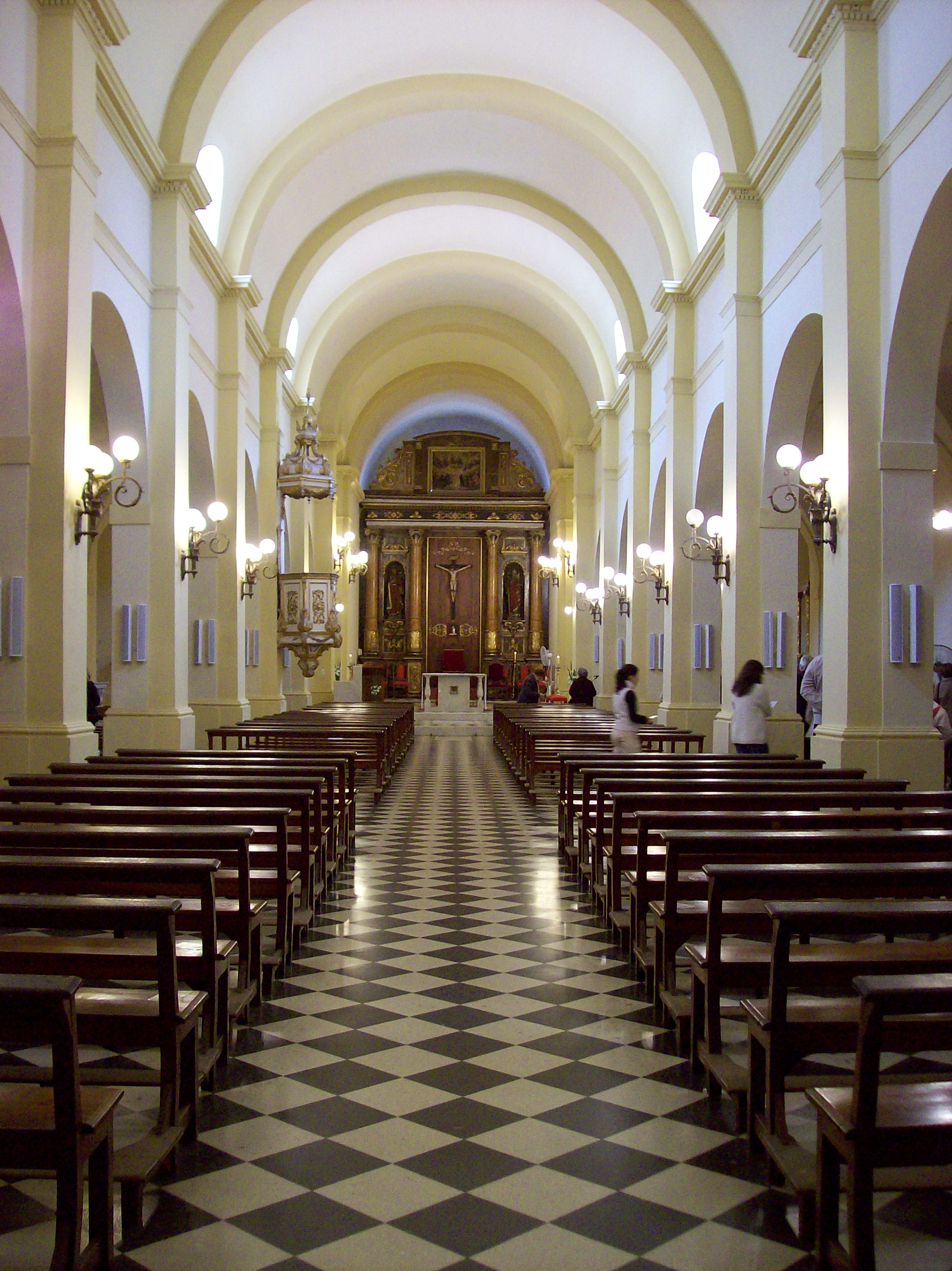
Internal view

== See also ==
- Roman Catholicism in Argentina
- All Saints Cathedral
