= Britain in Europe =

British pro-European pressure group

Until August 2005, Britain in Europe was the main British pro-European pressure group. Despite connections to Labour and the Liberal Democrats, it was a cross-party organisation with supporters from many different political backgrounds. Initially founded to campaign for a “Yes” vote for the euro, it then progressed to support a “Yes” vote for the referendum on the Treaty establishing a Constitution for Europe.

The organisation was launched in 1999 by Tony Blair, Gordon Brown, Kenneth Clarke, Michael Heseltine and Charles Kennedy. In 2003, the organisation formally linked itself with the Brussels-based, pro-European, international organisation European Movement.

The director of Britain in Europe was Simon Buckby and later Lucy Powell. The director of communications was the Scottish Liberal Democrat politician Danny Alexander.

On 17 August 2005, the group was wound up following the French and Dutch "No" votes on the proposed European Constitution. Its resources were turned over to the European Movement.

A successor pro-EU campaign, founded in 2012, is British Influence.

== Publications ==
All are PDF files

- Straight Bananas: 201 anti-European myths exploded (543kb)
- There's something about UKIP (223kb)
- The Truth is Out There (865kb)

== Backers ==
The organisation disclosed the names of individuals and companies from which it received donations of more than £5,000, in line with the requirements of the Political Parties Act, although it was not a political party and was not obliged to do so.

=== List of backers ===
- Amicus
- Alstom UK Ltd
- Rod Aldridge
- BAE Systems
- BMP DDB
- BAT
- Kumar Bhattacharyya
- Winfried Bischoff
- British Midland
- British Telecommunications plc
- Bunzl PLC
- Cookson Group plc
- Dyson Appliances Ltd
- Ernst & Young LLP
- European Movement
- Lord Evans of Watford
- Ford Motor Company
- Chris Gent
- Christopher Haskins
- Lord Hollick
- Lord Howe of Aberavon
- ICL PLC
- Kellogg's
- Kimberly-Clark Ltd
- KPMG
- Lord Marshall of Knightsbridge
- Mind share UK
- Nestlé (UK) Ltd
- Gulam Noon
- Lindsay Owen-Jones
- Philips Electronics (UK) Ltd
- PricewaterhouseCoopers
- Reuters Group PLC
- Joseph Rowntree Reform Trust
- Lord Sainsbury of Turville
- Colin Sharman, Baron Sharman
- Siemens AG PLC
- Barry Townsley
- Adair Turner
- UBM plc
- Unilever PLC
- Xerox Ltd
- Wrigley UK Ltd

== See also ==
- British Influence
- UKIP
