= Gulam Noon, Baron Noon =

British businessman (1936–2015)

The Right Honourable The Lord Noon MBE

Member of the House of Lords
- Lord Temporal
- Life peerage 27 January 2011 – 27 October 2015

Personal details
- Born: Gulam Kaderbhoy Noon; 24 January 1936 Bombay, India
- Died: 27 October 2015 (aged 79) London, England
- Citizenship: British
- Party: Labour

Gulam Kaderbhoy Noon, Baron Noon, MBE (24 January 1936 – 27 October 2015) was a Mumbai-born British businessman. Known as the "Curry King", Noon operated a number of food product companies in Southall, London. He was a member of the Dawoodi Bohra Ismaili Shia community.

== Early life ==
Noon was born in 1936 into a Dawoodi Bohra Muslim family which operated a sweet shop in Bombay. His father died when he was 7, and a relative ran the business until Noon took over its management at the age of 17. He renamed the shop "Royal Sweets", and expanded its clientele and size until it was capable of exporting internationally.

In 1964, Noon travelled to Britain and emigrated permanently in 1972. He established a sweet shop in Southall, producing such products as Bombay mix.

== Career ==
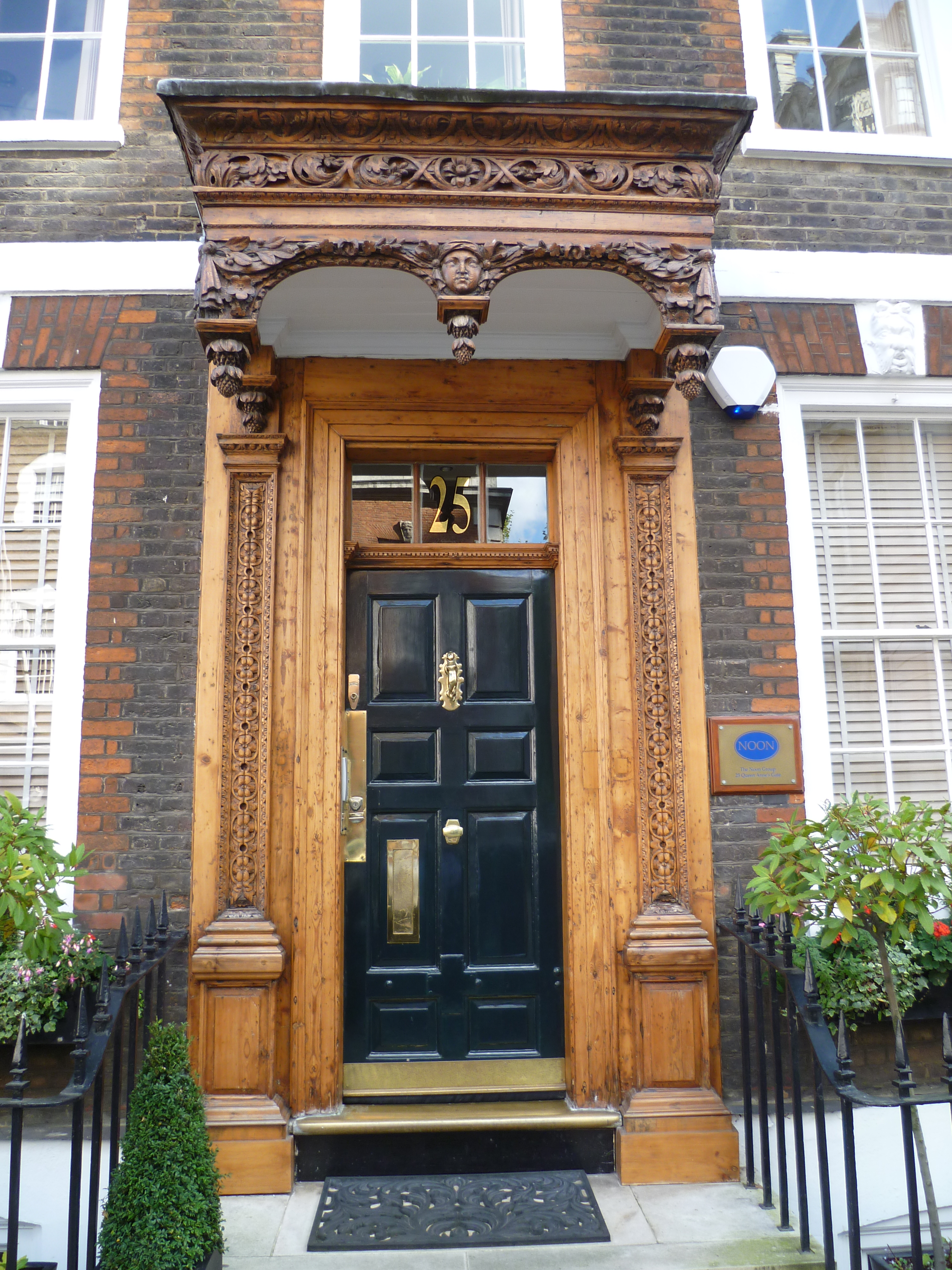
Noon group offices at Queen Anne's Gate, London

Noon founded and operated a number of food product companies in Southall, London, specialising in Indian cuisine. His main business was Noon Products which he established in September 1987, manufacturing chilled and frozen Indian and Thai ready meals, predominantly for UK supermarkets. Though he did not invent the dish, Noon is credited with the popularity of chicken tikka masala in Britain.

In 1994, the company experienced a serious factory fire which destroyed much of its manufacturing capability, but within ten weeks the company began selling its products again. Noon kept all his staff in employment during this period.

In 2005, Noon Products was taken over by Irish food conglomerate Kerry Group.

== Other interests ==
In March 2006 he came to wider notice as one of the businessmen embroiled in the "Cash for Peerages" scandal when it emerged that he had loaned £250,000 to the Labour Party. He was made a Member of the Order of the British Empire for services to the food industry in 1994 (under a Conservative government) and knighted in 2002. Labour MP Jeremy Corbyn said that awarding knighthoods to party donors, like Noon, would devalue the whole honours system. In 2010, Noon was invited to become one of the Labour Party's assistant treasurers, a fund-raising role. He told The Guardian: "I have always been a Labour supporter and wanted to ensure that Gordon Brown was given an opportunity to finish off the job that we started under Blair so I accepted [the] invitation".

Noon was a declared backer of the Britain in Europe group, a pro-European pressure group. He was a trustee of the Maimonides Foundation, a charitable organisation promoting dialogue between Jews and Muslims.

== Personal life ==
A castaway on the BBC Radio 4 programme Desert Island Discs in 2004, in The Sunday Times Rich List 2006 he was placed in 888th position with an estimated fortune of £65 million. He died of cancer on 27 October 2015.

=== Views on extremist imams ===
Noon was among those trapped in the Taj Mahal Palace Hotel by terrorists during the 2008 Mumbai attacks, but was rescued and later appeared on BBC News to describe his experiences. He subsequently praised the response by India's Muslim community to the attacks, saying:

"Indian Muslims have refused to bury the nine dead terrorists. They are still in the mortuary. It is a good symbolic message for the rest of secular India." "Now Britain needs to get tough with the radical imams. We have the power to do something."

He also called for Britain to toughen measures against extremist Muslim preachers, and said that the door was open for foreign imams to radicalise young Muslims in mosques across Britain:

"Having seen what I saw at close quarters, the indiscriminate violence and pain inflicted in the name of my religion, I am astounded that I hear from friends in the community that radical preachers are still coming to this country and praising attacks by Al-Qaeda and suicide missions. There is a limit to free speech. Extremists who preach their approval of suicide bombers should be sent back to their country of origin."

== Honours ==
Noon was made a Member of the Order of the British Empire (MBE) in the 1996 New Year Honours. He was later made a Knight Bachelor in the 2002 Birthday Honours, having the honour conferred in December that year.

He was awarded an Honorary Degree from the University of East London on 12 November 2009. In January 2013, Lord Noon was appointed as the chancellor of that institution. In this titular position, he presided over the degree ceremonies.

On 27 January 2011, he was created a life peer as Baron Noon, of St John's Wood in the London Borough of Camden and was introduced in the House of Lords on 31 January 2011, where he sat on the Labour benches.

On 26 April 2012, Noon was made a Fellow of Birkbeck, a constituent college of the University of London.

== Arms ==
Coat of arms of Gulam Noon, Baron Noon

Crest
Two peacocks respectant Proper holding between them a torch Gules banded Or enflamed Proper.
Escutcheon
Gules on a fess between three Bengal tigers passant Or three doves Sable.
Supporters
On either side statant upon a rock a peacock Proper gorged with a coronet Or.

== Books ==
- Noon, with a View: Courage and Integrity (2009) ISBN 978-1-904445-79-1

Academic offices
Preceded by The Lord Rix	Chancellor of the University of East London; 2013–2015	Succeeded by TBD
