= Durham Catholic District School Board =

Catholic school board

Address
- 650 Rossland Road West Oshawa, Ontario, L1J 7C4; Canada
- Coordinates: 43.91026395816997°N 78.89542068230386°W

District information
- Type: School Board
- Motto: Catholic Education: Learning and Living in Faith
- Chief executive officer: Gerard Winn
- Chair of the board: Morgan Ste. Marie
- Governing agency: Ministry of Education
- Schools: 46 (39 elementary, 7 secondary)

Students and staff
- Enrolment: 21,524
- Colours: Maroon

Other information
- Locations: Oshawa; Whitby; Ajax; Pickering; Oshawa; Uxbridge; Scugog; Brock
- Website: www.dcdsb.ca

The Durham Catholic District School Board (DCDSB, known as English-language Separate District School Board No. 45 prior to 1999) is a Catholic school board located in Durham Region, east of Toronto, Ontario. It currently runs 39 elementary schools and 7 secondary schools. The board also runs one Adult Education Centre in Ajax and one Continuing Education Centre in Oshawa.

The DCDSB has engaged in a focused effort to improve student learning through ongoing staff development in the area of instructional leadership. Of note is the steady improvement in student achievement as reported by the results of Provincial Assessments in math and literacy, also known as the EQAO tests.

The DCDSB was previously known as the Durham Region Roman Catholic Separate School Board (DRRCSSB) until the end of 1997, operating both anglophone and francophone schools. The French schools in the Durham Region are now operated by Conseil scolaire catholique MonAvenir.

== List of schools ==
The following are a list of schools run by the Durham Catholic District School Board. The date refers to the year that the school opened while F.I. indicates a school with a French Immersion program.

- St. Mary Catholic Secondary School (established 1987, Pickering)
- Father Fenelon Catholic School (established 2014, Pickering)
- St. Elizabeth Seton Catholic School (established 1996, Pickering)
- St. Isaac Jogues Catholic School (established 1981, Pickering)
- St. Joseph Catholic School (established 1989, Uxbridge, known as "St. Joe's")
- St. Josephine Bakhita (established 2012, Ajax)
- St. Marguerite Bourgeoys Catholic School (established 1983, Pickering; closed and amalgamated into St. Elizabeth Seton C.S. in the 2013/2014 school year)
- St. Monica Catholic School (established 1987, Pickering)
- Notre Dame Catholic Secondary School (established 2001, Ajax)
- St. Andre Bessette Catholic School (established 2005, Ajax)
- St. Teresa of Calcutta Catholic School (established 1998, Ajax)
- St. Anthony Daniel Catholic School (established 1987, Pickering; closed)
- St. Catherine of Siena Catholic School (established 1990, Ajax)
- St. Patrick Catholic School (established 1991, Ajax)
- St. Wilfrid Catholic School (established 1994, Pickering)
- Archbishop Denis O'Connor Catholic High School (Ajax; known as "DO'C")
- St. Bernadette Catholic School (established 2009, Ajax)
- St. Francis de Sales Catholic School (established 1953, Ajax)
- St. James Catholic School (established 1986, Ajax)
- St. Jude Catholic School (established 1989, Ajax)
- All Saints Catholic Secondary School (established 2001, Whitby; F.I.)
- St. Bridget Catholic School (established 2004, Brooklin, Whitby)
- St. John the Evangelist Catholic School (established 1955, Whitby)
- St. Leo Catholic School (established 1997, Brooklin, Whitby F.I)
- St. John Paul II Catholic School (established ???, Brooklin, Whitby, known as "J.P. II")
- St. Luke the Evangelist Catholic School (Whitby)
- St. Marguerite d'Youville Catholic School (established 1988, Whitby, known as "S.M.D.")
- St. Matthew the Evangelist Catholic School (established 1990, Whitby)
- Father Leo J. Austin Catholic Secondary School (1989, Whitby; known as "Austin" F.I.)
- St. Bernard Catholic School (established 1990, Whitby)
- St. Mark the Evangelist Catholic School (established 1992, Whitby)
- St. Matthew the Evangelist Catholic School (established 1990, Whitby)
- St. Paul Catholic School (established 1961, Whitby)
- St. Theresa Catholic School (established 1958, Whitby)
- Monsignor Paul Dwyer Catholic High School (established 1965, Oshawa, known as "Dwyer".)
- St. Anne Catholic School (established 2020, Oshawa)
- Father Joseph Venini Catholic School (established 1969, Oshawa; closed)
- Holy Family Catholic School (established 1990, Beaverton, Brock Township)
- Good Shepherd Catholic School (established 1999, Port Perry, Scugog Township)
- Immaculate Conception Catholic School (established 1985 Port Perry, Scugog Township; closed)
- Sir Albert Love Catholic School (established 1965, Oshawa)
- St. Christopher Catholic School (established 1955, Oshawa)
- St. John Bosco Catholic School (established 2000, Oshawa, known as "Bosco")
- St. Joseph Catholic School (established 2007, Oshawa)
- Monsignor John Pereyma Catholic Secondary School (established 1988, Oshawa)
- John XXIII Catholic School (established 1968, Oshawa)
- Monsignor Philip Coffey Catholic School (established 1959, Oshawa)
- St. Hedwig Catholic School (established 1958, Oshawa)
- St. Thomas Aquinas Catholic School (Oshawa, F.I.)
- St. Kateri Tekakwitha Catholic School (established 2015, Oshawa)

== See also ==
- Durham District School Board
- Conseil scolaire catholique MonAvenir
- Conseil Scolaire Viamonde
- Archdiocese of Toronto
- List of school districts in Ontario
- List of secondary schools in Ontario
