= Father Leo J. Austin Catholic Secondary School =

Catholic high school in Whitby, Ontario, Canada

Location
- 1020 Dryden Blvd. Whitby, Ontario, L1R 2A2; Canada; 43°54′43″N 78°56′15″W

Information
- School type: Separate (Catholic) high school
- Motto: Excellence, Faith, Community
- Religious affiliation: Catholic
- Founded: 1989
- School board: Durham Catholic District School Board
- Area trustee: Tricia Chapman; John Rinella
- School number: 710083
- Principal: Colleen Plouffe
- Grades: 9–12
- Enrolment: 990 (2019/2020)
- Language: English and French
- Colours: Red, Black, Grey and White
- Mascot: Wildcat
- Team name: Wildcats
- Feeder schools: St. Matthew the Evangelist Catholic School, St. Bernard Catholic School, St. Theresa Catholic School, St. Paul Catholic School, St. Mark the Evangelist Catholic School (Regular and Extended French), St. Thomas Aquinas Catholic School (Extended French), St. John the Evangelist Catholic School (Extended French), St. Leo Catholic School (Extended French)
- Parish: Holy Family Catholic Church (Whitby); St. Leo the Great Catholic Church (Brooklin)
- Website: Official website

Father Leo J. Austin Catholic Secondary School (also known as Father Leo, Leo J. Austin, FLJA, or Austin for short) is a coeducational, Catholic, secondary school located in Whitby, Ontario, Canada, and it is managed by the Durham Catholic District School Board (DCDSB). Today, it is an active school and is open for students grade 9 to 12. It’s one of the Catholic high schools in the DCDSB to offer the French Immersion program which draws students around the Durham Region.

== History ==
Father Leo J. Austin was a priest born in Toronto on June 3, 1939. He was a priest at St. John the Evangelist Catholic Church located in Giffard Street in Whitby. Before coming to Whitby in 1956, he served in several Toronto parishes. Catholic education was of particular interest to Father Austin: in 1959 he brought the Grey Sisters, a teaching order of nuns, to Whitby; under his guidance, St. Theresa Catholic School was built, and St. Leo Catholic School in Brooklin; he built four additions to St. John the Evangelist Catholic School, and started Archbishop Denis O'Connor Catholic High School in 1964 in Whitby (was moved to Ajax in 1984). Because of his great contribution to the community of Whitby, the school, Father Leo J. Austin Catholic Secondary School, was created and named after him.

The building currently housing Father Leo J. Austin was officially opened following the Thanksgiving weekend of 1990, though classes had been ongoing since the Labour Day weekend of 1989 in 2 separate temporary locations.

In 2014, the school celebrated the 25th anniversary of its opening in 1989.

== Academic programs and features ==
- Advanced placement credits in grade 12 math; calculus and vectors, and advanced functions.
- Pre-AP courses in math from grade 9–11.
- Multiple Specialized High Skills Major (SHSM) programs.
- Extended French programs for students in grade 9–12.
- Religion courses offered in the school for grades 9–12; taking Religion is mandatory for all students.
- Head start program for students transitioning into grade 9.
- The Ontario Youth Apprenticeship Program (OYAP) offered in grade 11 and 12 for students who want to explore and work in apprenticeship occupations.
- Cooperative Education (Co-Op), a program that allows students to earn credits while completing a work placement in the community.

=== Pre- and Advanced Placement (AP) ===
The AP program of Austin is recognized by universities in both Canada and the United States. One can earn advanced standing at university in mathematics through their AP advanced functions, and calculus and vectors courses. Enriched (pre-AP) math credits are also available in grades 9, 10, and 11, as they are prerequisites for students if they wish to take the Advanced Placement Exam in their grade 12 year.

=== Specialized High Skills Major (SHSM) ===
The SHSM is a program provided in the school that lets students focus on a career path that matches their skills and interests while meeting the requirements of the Ontario Secondary School Diploma (OSSD).

SHSM programs that are offered in the school:

- Arts and Culture
- Business
- Hospitality and Tourism
- Information and Communications Technology

=== Extended French program ===
At Austin, the Extended French program is offered from grades 9 to 12 which provide students with the means to develop more advanced French skills, enabling them to communicate effectively in speech and in writing. In this program, there are courses that provide opportunities for students to speak and interact in French in a variety of real-life and personally relevant contexts.

Only students that have received a minimum of 1,260 hours of extended French instruction by the end of their grade 8 year may be enrolled in this program.

=== Religion program ===
At Austin, religion is not an elective and must be taken. Religious education is an academic subject that strengthens religious literacy and critical thinking. At the end of the term, there is a religious exam for the course.

== Co-curricular activities ==
There are many co-curricular activities that are offered to the students at Father Leo J. Austin. Austin has a traditional Student Council which students are encouraged to join and are elected to be part of. Student Council represents the student body voice, initiates school and social events for students, and help distribute/collect funds from fundraising events. Student council helps form events along with the Leadership class at the school.

=== Athletics ===
Father Leo J. Austin Catholic Secondary School offers a fairly wide range of athletic teams including soccer, basketball, ice hockey, badminton, curling, volleyball, lacrosse, rugby, track and field, cross country, varsity girls fastball, varsity boys baseball, golf, tennis, dance, and table tennis.

== Notable alumni ==
- Keara Graves, actress
- Jay Harrison, Professional hockey player
- John LaFontaine, Lacrosse player
- Priscilla Lopes-Schliep, Olympic bronze medalist hurdler
- Gavin Prout, Lacrosse player, member of the Canadian team that won the 2006 World Lacrosse Championship
- Paul Ranger, Professional hockey player
- Jonah Gadjovich, Professional hockey player
- Kailen Sheridan, International soccer player, Olympic gold medalist
- Jessica Klimkait, Olympic judoka

== See also ==
- Education in Ontario
- List of secondary schools in Ontario
