= All Saints Episcopal School =

All Saints Episcopal School may refer to:

- All Saints Episcopal School (Lubbock, Texas)
- All Saints Episcopal School (Tyler, Texas)
