= Andrew Rosenfeld =

British businessman (1962–2015)

Andrew Ian Rosenfeld
- Born: Andrew Rosenfeld; 27 April 1962
- Died: 8 February 2015 (aged 52)
- Education: South Bank Polytechnic
- Occupation: Property developer
- Known for: Co-founder, Minerva PLC
- Spouse: Juliet Soskice (m. 2014)
- Children: 4

Andrew Ian Rosenfeld (27 April 1962 – 8 February 2015) was a British businessman who was co-founder, chief executive, and chairman of Minerva plc. He volunteered for a number of charitable organisations and was a major donor to the Labour Party. Rosenfeld was one of twelve wealthy donors to the Labour Party named in the Cash for Honours scandal of 2006. In 2012 he co-founded The People's Operator, a mobile telephone company.

== Early life ==
Rosenfeld had a bachelor's degree in Estate Management from South Bank Polytechnic, and thereafter qualified as a member of the Royal Institution of Chartered Surveyors.

== Charitable activities ==
He was head of the U.K. National Society for the Prevention of Cruelty to Children's "Full Stop" campaign, raising £250 million which is the largest sum ever raised in Britain for a single children's appeal. Formerly he was a Jewish Care trustee. He was a Vice-President of the NSPCC and was Chairman of the Full Stop Fellowship.

== Political involvement ==
Before the 2005 General Election he lent £1,033,000 to the Labour Party as part of the Cash for Honours scandal and, in partial return, was invited to a private dinner with Tony Blair at 10 Downing Street. Rosenfeld denied that he made the loan expecting to receive an honour in exchange although he was nominated for one by some of Blair's top aides. It was subsequently repaid in full by 2009.

In 2010 Rosenfeld had abandoned his support of the Labour Party, choosing to endorse David Cameron, the Conservative candidate. Rosenfeld said that Cameron was "the man for the job – no doubt about it" and that the Labour Party had "run out of time." By 2011 Rosenfeld was again backing the Labour Party, having emerged as its "most generous private donor." He had announced that he would donate £1 million to the Labour Party for the 2015 general election campaign.

== Career ==
Rosenfeld's father and grandfather were both in real-estate and he learned the rudiments of the trade by tagging along with his father while he evaluated properties. He took his first job after college with Schroders, where he worked for two years. He subsequently worked at SW Berisford evaluating properties in New York and California. In the mid-1980s, at the age of 23, Rosenfeld was hired by David Garrard to run one of his companies, Land Investors. By the end of the decade he and Garrard had founded Minerva.

Rosenfeld was already joint chairman of Minerva in 1997 at the age of 35. He, by that time chief executive of Minerva, replaced David Garrard as chairman of the company in March 2005. Rosenfeld was replaced as chief executive at the end of June 2005. He resigned as executive chairman in October 2005. While living in Geneva as a tax exile he set up a company called "Air Capital" and formed a partnership with the Goldman Sachs Whitehall Fund.

=== The People's Operator ===
In 2012 Rosenfeld founded a new mobile phone company, The People's Operator, that contributes 10% of income and 25% of profits to charity and other non-profit organisations.

== Personal life ==
In 2006 he moved to Geneva to avoid paying taxes in Britain but returned to the UK in April 2011. While he lived in Switzerland he held many of his assets offshore in the British Virgin Islands, but upon returning to Britain moved them back into that country.

Rosenfeld had four children from his first marriage, which was dissolved. He married again in 2014, to Juliet Soskice, a "close friend" of Ed Miliband.

He died of lung cancer, despite never having smoked.
