= Archbishop Denis O'Connor Catholic High School =

Catholic school in Ontario, Canada

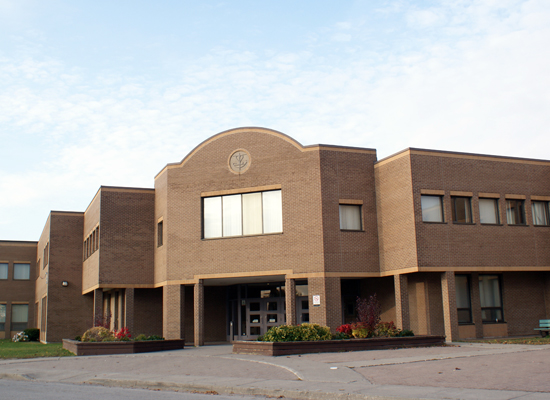
- The front entrance of Archbishop Denis O'Connor Catholic High School.

Location
- 80 Mandrake Street; Ajax, Ontario; L1S 5H4; Canada

Information
- Type: Catholic school, high school
- Motto: Nil sine fide et labore
- Established: September, 1964
- School district: Durham Catholic District School Board
- School number: 703923
- Principal: J. MacNeil
- Grades: 9-12
- Enrolment: 585 (2019/2020)
- Language: Canadian English, and Canadian French
- Campus: Suburban
- Colours: Green and Yellow
- Athletics: Baseball, Soccer and Basketball
- Uniform colours: Green, Grey, and White
- Website: Archbishop Denis O'Connor Catholic High School

Archbishop Denis O'Connor Catholic High School (abbreviated DO'C) is a Roman Catholic high school located in Ajax, Ontario, Canada, within the Durham Catholic District School Board. It is named for Archbishop Denis T. O'Connor, a priest who was born in Pickering in 1841, and who became the third Archbishop of Toronto, Ontario, Canada in 1899. The school has students in grades 9–12 and offers a wide range of academic and extracurricular activities. The current enrolment is approximately 600 students. The school colours are green and yellow, and its motto is Nil sine fide et labore, which is Latin for "Nothing without faith and work."

In 2024, the school celebrated the 60th anniversary of its opening in 1964.

== History ==
Archbishop Denis O'Connor Catholic High School was founded by Father Leo J. Austin and was officially opened in September, 1964 in Whitby, Ontario. The school was moved to its new home of Ajax in 1984. On November 18, 1984, it was officially opened and blessed by Cardinal Carter. In 1991 a major addition was constructed which increased its capacity to approximately 1,000 students.

== Associate Schools ==
The school's students generally come from the following Catholic Elementary Schools which are all located in Ajax:

- St. Jude Catholic Elementary School
- St. James Catholic Elementary School,
- St. Francis de Sales Catholic Elementary School
- St. Bernadette Catholic Elementary School
- St. Teresa Catholic Elementary School.

== Notable alumni and groups ==
- Devin Shore, National Hockey League
- Paul Peschisolido, retired professional soccer player
- Candace Chapman, women's professional soccer player, member of the Canada women's national soccer team and Olympian, Olympic bronze medalist
- Toya Alexis, Canadian R&B vocalist
- Ruby Bhatia, India's first music veejay
- Keith Godding, wide receiver, Toronto Argonauts
- Michael Kostka, Ottawa Senators, Toronto Maples Leafs

== See also ==
- Education in Ontario
- List of secondary schools in Ontario
