= Tony's Cronies =

Pejorative phrase against Tony Blair

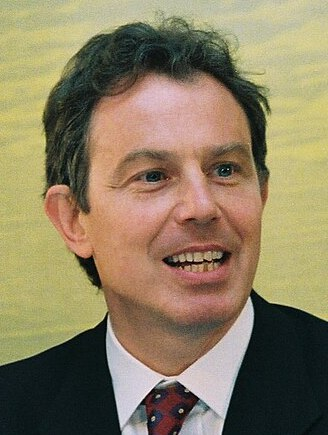
Some people appointed to positions of power by Tony Blair were called "Tony's Cronies".

"Tony's Cronies" was a term in British politics and media given to people who were viewed as being given positions of power because of their personal friendships with Prime Minister Tony Blair, during his premiership between 1997 and 2007. These included those granted life peerages and public positions based on their friendship with Blair rather than their individual merits. The phrase was created by the Conservative Party following the 1997 general election and was continually used in the media throughout Blair's premiership.

== History ==
The term originated following the 1997 general election when the Conservative Party referred to people awarded positions of power by Tony Blair as "Tony's Cronies", as the Labour Party had won the election. These people were compared to medieval courtiers, viewed to have been appointed to positions of power because of their historical personal background with Blair. Lord Irvine of Lairg, appointed Lord Chancellor, was Blair's first boss; whilst Anji Hunter, who had been at school with Blair, was made Blair's office manager. His childhood friend and former flatmate, Charlie Falconer, was appointed as a peer, sat on 14 Cabinet sub-committees and later joined the Cabinet.

=== House of Lords ===
During his first term of office, Blair created 203 life peers, whom the Conservatives referred to as "Tony's Cronies". In 1999, William Hague, the Leader of the Conservative Party and the Leader of the Opposition, referred in the House of Commons to the House of Lords Bill, as replacing the House of Lords with a "house of cronies". When the bill was passed, it removed the rights of hereditary peers to sit in the House of Lords; they were replaced by life peers and the House of Lords was called "a chamber of Tony's Cronies", as many life peers had been appointed by Blair to replace the hereditary peers. However, while the bill was going through the Parliamentary stages, the Conservative hereditary peers voted through an amendment that an independent body, which became known as the House of Lords Appointments Commission, would be created to check all further nominations to the House of Lords. This was intended to prevent the Prime Minister from being able to create new life peers at will or on personal grounds. It also made the provision for "people's peers" to be created, independent of political influence, which was viewed in the media as a way to balance against "Tony's Cronies".

Despite the House of Lords Act removing many Conservative Peers, the Conservatives still held a plurality in that body, leading Blair to appoint additional peers; in 2004 alone he made 23 new appointments. This came after Conservative peers sometimes voted with crossbenchers and Liberal Democrat peers against Labour's proposed legislation. It was also due to poor attendance from the Labour Party's working peers. In 2005, Blair appointed 16 new life peers to the House of Lords, making Labour the strongest party in the House for the first time ever. These regular appointments of new peers on apparent favouritism was criticised by the Scottish National Party's Chief Whip, Pete Wishart, as a "typical Establishment fix".

=== Other positions ===
The accusations of cronyism also extended to a number of public appointments Blair made. In 2001, the public administration select committee held an inquiry into the claims that the government rewarded "Tony's Cronies". In 2002, there were also accusations of cronyism from the Conservatives and the Mayor of London, Ken Livingstone, when Labour gave Lord Hollick, a friend of Blair, the chairmanship of the Southbank Centre arts complex as a personal gift. Labour rejected this claim, saying that the appointment was not covered by the public appointments guidelines. The accusation of "Tony's Cronies" also extended to the European Union when Blair appointed Peter Mandelson as the UK's European Union Commissioner. This move was criticised by members of the Labour party, with Labour MP, Ian Davidson, saying that it was "... seen as arrogance by New Labour, bringing in a crony of the Prime Minister who is deeply unpopular in the Labour Party."

Raising the spectre of "Tony's Cronies" became a standard method of attacking Blair.

In 2007, Blair resigned and Gordon Brown took over the position of prime minister. Brown started to remove most of those who were seen as "Tony's Cronies" from the Cabinet. However, there were reports of Labour MPs trying to gain favour with Brown after he appointed his former press secretary, Ian Austin, as his Parliamentary Private Secretary.

== Legacy ==
After Blair left office, people who had been given positions by Brown after he had become prime minister were referred to as "Brown-nosers". In 2010, when the Conservatives formed a new government in coalition with the Liberal Democrats following the 2010 general election, the new prime minister David Cameron faced similar accusations to Blair when he was perceived as rewarding with life peerages those who had assisted him. These people were referred to as "Dave's Faves", an intended allusion to "Tony's Cronies".
