= All Saints High School =

All Saints High School or All Saints Secondary School may refer to:

== Canada ==
- All Saints Catholic High School (Ottawa), Ontario
- All Saints Catholic Secondary School, Whitby, Ontario
- All Saints High School (Calgary), Alberta

== India ==
- All Saints High School (Andhra Pradesh), Hyderabad

== Malaysia ==
- All Saints Secondary School, Kota Kinabalu, Sabah

== United Kingdom ==
- All Saints Catholic High School, Kirkby, Merseyside, England
- All Saints' Catholic High School, Rawtenstall, Lancashire
- All Saints Catholic High School, Sheffield, South Yorkshire
- All Saints Roman Catholic Secondary School, Glasgow

== United States ==
- All Saints High School (Detroit, Michigan)
- All Saints High School, a former high school in Washington, D.C., merged into Archbishop Carroll High School in 1989

== See also ==
- All Saints School (disambiguation)
