= All Saints College =

All Saints College or All Saints' College may refer to:

== Australia ==
=== New South Wales ===
- All Saints' College, Bathurst
  - Merged in 2019 to form Scots All Saints' College
- All Saints College, Maitland
- All Saints College, St Joseph's Campus, Lochinvar
- All Saints Catholic schools in Liverpool comprising:
  - All Saints Catholic Senior College, Casula
  - All Saints Catholic College, Liverpool

=== Western Australia ===
- All Saints' College, Perth

== India ==
- All Saints College, Thiruvananthapuram, Kerala

== Sri Lanka ==
- All Saints College, Galle

== United Kingdom ==
- All Saints College, Belfast, Northern Ireland
- All Saints Catholic College, Dukinfield, Greater Manchester, England
- All Saints Catholic College, Huddersfield, West Yorkshire, England
- All Saints Catholic College, North Kensington, London, England
- All Saints College, a former name of Leeds Trinity University

== United States ==
- All Saints' College (Vicksburg), Mississippi

== See also ==
- All Saints (disambiguation), includes other schools called All Saints
- All Saints Academy (disambiguation)
- All Saints School (disambiguation)
- All Saints University (disambiguation)
