= Barry Townsley =

British financier (born 1946)

Barry Stephen Townsley CBE (born 14 October 1946) is a British financier and investor.

== Early life ==
Barry Townsley was educated at the Hasmonean Grammar School in London. He did not attend university, but started his career as a messenger for a stockbroking firm, working his way up to being one of the youngest members of the London Stock Exchange.

== Early career ==
In 1964, Townsley left school at the age of 17 and secured a job in the City of London as a messenger for the stockbroker, W. Greenwell & Co. He quickly progressed to the firm's gilts department, joining the London Stock Exchange at the age of 21. In 1969, he joined Astaire & Co, another City of London stockbroking firm where he met Ronnie Jacobson with whom in 1976 he set up Jacobson Townsley, which became a very successful British stockbroking firm in the 80s.

== Townsley and Co ==
Townsley created his own stockbroking business, Townsley & Co., which he sold to the Dutch private bank Insinger de Beaufort. Townsley & Co was formed in 1991 when Jacobson left frontline stockbroking. The pair remain friends to this day. Townsley built up the company throughout the 90s before selling it to a Dutch bank, Insinger de Beaufort, in 1999. Townsley remained with the company for a further three years.

== Cash for peerages ==
Townsley was a member and supporter of the Labour Party, recorded as donating "more than £5,000" before 2001 and £6,000 since 2001. He also donated £10,000 to the London Mayoral campaign of Frank Dobson.

Described as "colourful" by The Sunday Times, Townsley was involved in the so-called "cash for peerages" scandal in March 2006, in which it was revealed that he had lent £1m to the Labour Party at the solicitation of Lord Levy, and contributed £1.5m to a City Academy in Hillingdon. He was nominated for a peerage shortly after making the loan, but in February 2006 he withdrew from the nomination on the grounds of press intrusion into his private life.

== Charitable work – health ==
Townsley has devoted a great deal of time to helping charities in areas of personal interest – education, health and art. He supported the St Mary's Hospital Save the Baby Fund from 1985 for thirteen year, five as chairman. The fund raised money for research projects into the treatment of factors that influence infertility, miscarriage and late pregnancy complications.

Between 1999 and 2002, Townsley was a board member of the Royal National Institute for the Blind. From 1996 until 2002 he was a trustee of the Child Bereavement Trust. in 2014, he resigned from the role of chairman of patrons of the Sheffield Institute Foundation for Motor Neurone Disease after performing the role for eight years. He is a patron, and formerly a trustee, of Trinity Hospice, which provides end of life care to people and support for families in central and south-west London. Between 2010 and mid 2016, he served as a director of the William J Clinton Foundation Insamlingsstiftelse, a Swedish-based organisation that has worked to build hospitals in Africa and to provide anti-AIDS drugs to hard-hit regions. He also serves as vice-president and executive council member of the Weizmann Institute, one of the world's leading multidisciplinary research institutions. In 2015, he became the President of the Weizmann Institute in the UK. He became a trustee of Alzheimers Research in the same year.

== Charitable work – education ==
In 2000 Townsley helped found Stockley Academy in Hillingdon, London. He is the school's principal sponsor. Stockley Academy specialises in science and technology, providing comprehensive education to over a thousand students between the ages of 11 and 18, 24% of whom do not have English as a first language and almost 39% of whom are eligible for free school meals.

== Charitable work – art ==
Between 1998 and 2002, Townsley was a member of the International Council of the Tate Gallery, which holds the national collection of British art from 1500 to the present day and also international modern and contemporary art. He was appointed a Trustee of the Serpentine Gallery in London in 1987, and since 1993 has served as its vice-chairman. The Serpentine Gallery was opened in May 1970 in a former tea pavilion to allow the work of emerging artists, particularly from the UK and its regions, to be exhibited. He also served as a board member of the National Gallery East Wing Development Project between 2002 and 2005.

== Art sales ==
Townsley is a collector of art. On 14 May 2014, he sold Andy Warhol's Six Self Portraits, 1986 lot 23 for $30,125,000. The works depict a suite of rainbow-hued images of the artist's gaunt face and were acquired in 1986 from the Anthony d'Offay Gallery, London at Warhol's acclaimed Self-Portrait exhibition. Townsley purchased the works before the exhibition opened.

== Personal life ==
Townsley is married to Laura Wolfson, daughter of Leonard Wolfson, Baron Wolfson of the GUS retail company. He is the father of four children and an active supporter of education, health and fine art charities. He lists his recreational interests as contemporary art and golf.

== Other work ==
Since January 2005, he has been chairman and founding partner of Hobart Capital Markets LLP, and also a director of Caprice Holdings Ltd.

Townsley has served as a trustee or board member for a large number of health and art charities, including the Child Bereavement Trust, National Gallery East Wing Development Project, Oxford Children's Hospital Campaign, Royal National Institute for the Blind, Serpentine Gallery, St Mary's Hospital Save the Baby Fund, Trinity Hospice, Weizmann Institute Foundation and Alzheimers Research. In 2005, he chaired the CSV Year of the Volunteer. He is the principal sponsor of Stockley Academy, a school specialising in science and technology. He is the chairman of the Central Synagogue – London.

== Awards ==
Townsley was appointed a CBE in 2003 for charitable services, especially to education and the arts.

== See also ==
- Wolfson family
