= Sunday Times Rich List 2005 =

The Sunday Times Rich List 2005 was published in April 2005.

Since 1989 the UK national Sunday newspaper The Sunday Times (sister paper to The Times) has published an annual magazine supplement to the newspaper called the Sunday Times Rich List. The list is based on an estimate of the minimum wealth of the richest 1,000 people or families in the United Kingdom as of January of that year, and is compiled by Dr Philip Beresford.

This article is concerned with the 2005 list only. For discussion of the lists generally, see Sunday Times Rich List.

A separate section lists the 250 richest Irish, including both Northern Ireland and the Republic of Ireland.

As in previous years, the List was widely previewed in the UK media and extensively covered on the day of its publication.

== Wealthiest Irish ==
| Rank | Value (£m) | Name | Source of wealth | 2004 Rank | 2004 Value (£m) |
|---|---|---|---|---|---|
| 1 | 5,100 | Hilary Weston and family | Retailing | NEW | N/A |
| 2 | 1,328 | Sir Tony O'Reilly and Chryss Goulandris | Food, media and inheritance | 2 | 1,268 |
| 3 | 1,300 | John Dorrance, III | Inheritance | 1 | 1,300 |
| 4 | 1,002 | Dermot Desmond | Finance | 3 | 846 |
| 5 | 810 | Sean Quinn and family | Quarries, hotels, insurance and industry | 4 | 771 |
| 6 | 780 | Tony Ryan and family | | | |

== See also ==
- Lists of billionaires
