= All Saints Academy, Ingleby Barwick =

Secondary school in Yorkshire, England

Coordinates: 54°31′07.1″N 1°19′12.6″W

All Saints Academy

Location
- Blair Avenue; Ingleby Barwick; North Yorkshire, TS17; England

Information
- Type: Academy
- Motto: Every child matters equally to God
- Religious affiliation: Church of England
- Local authority: Stockton-on-Tees
- Trust: Dales Academies Trust
- Department for Education URN: 139606 Tables
- Ofsted: Reports
- Head teacher: Ashleigh Lees
- Gender: Male and Female
- Age: 11 to 16
- Houses: Oswald, Helena, Hild, Francis, Cuthbert, Aidan
- Website: www.allsaintsib.org

All Saints Academy (formerly All Saints CofE School) is a mixed Church of England secondary school located in Ingleby Barwick in the Borough of Stockton-on-Tees, North Yorkshire, England.

Previously a voluntary aided school administered by Stockton-on-Tees Borough Council and the Church of England Diocese of York, All Saints CofE School converted to academy status in May 2013 and was renamed All Saints Academy. The school is still administered by the Diocese of York but is now independent of council control.

All Saints Academy offers GCSEs and BTECs as programmes of study for pupils. In 2015 it was named as the top performing school in Teesside.

== History ==
The school opened as All Saints Voluntary Aided Church of England Secondary School and initially accommodated 600 pupils. From September 2009 the admission number to year 7 had been increased to 140 pupils.

The school was built through PFI funding. The original PFI Provider (Robertson Construction North East) have recently sold the investment on to another company making a reported £1 million profit. The Evening Gazette on 22 November 2011 in an article on PFI said "Stockton Council has one PFI contract, for the Ingleby Barwick Community Campus which features All Saints School, Myton Park Primary School, and a library. The deal is worth £33.9m for the remaining 17 years of the contract. The private contractor Robertson North East says the complex is worth £9m on its website."

All Saints provides places for less than half of the children of secondary school age currently living in Ingleby Barwick, with most of the remainder. In May 2013 All Saints school became an Academy, renaming to "All Saints Academy".
