= All Saints' Academy, Cheltenham =

School in Gloucestershire, England

Coordinates: 51.907278°N 2.098305°W

All Saints' Academy

Location
- Blaisdon Way; Cheltenham, Gloucestershire, GL51 0WH; England

Information
- Type: Academy
- Motto: Excellence, Inclusion, Christian
- Established: September 2011
- Department for Education URN: 136016 Tables
- Ofsted: Reports
- Principal: Benjamin Williams
- Gender: Mixed
- Age: 11 to 18
- Enrolment: 1,098
- Capacity: 1,150
- Colours: Red and white
- Website: www.asachelt.org

All Saints' Academy is a Christian church school in Cheltenham in cooperation with the Church of England Diocese of Gloucester. Construction started in April 2010. The academy opened in September 2011. The project was budgeted to cost nearly £25 million with £2 million on IT equipment. The school replaced Kingsmead and Christ College which opened as recently as 2007 as the county's first joint Roman Catholic and Church of England school.

Christ College had used the premises formerly occupied by St Benedict's from 1962 to 2007 which had been Catholic secondary School in Cheltenham. The opportunity of having a newly built school on the site of Kingsmead School formerly occupied by Arle School from 1959 to 1995 Kingsmead was closing due to falling numbers having been in special measures and turning the school into an academy justified making a fresh start with a new name. The school has room to educate 1150 students aged 11–18 and the school's specialisms will be science and sport.

All Saints' Academy was rated good after an Ofsted inspection in late 2018.

In May 2010, an Anglo-Saxon settlement was discovered on the site.
