= All Saints' Cathedral, Onitsha =

Anglican cathedral in Onitsha, Nigeria

Coordinates: 6°9′16.927″N 6°47′22.348″E

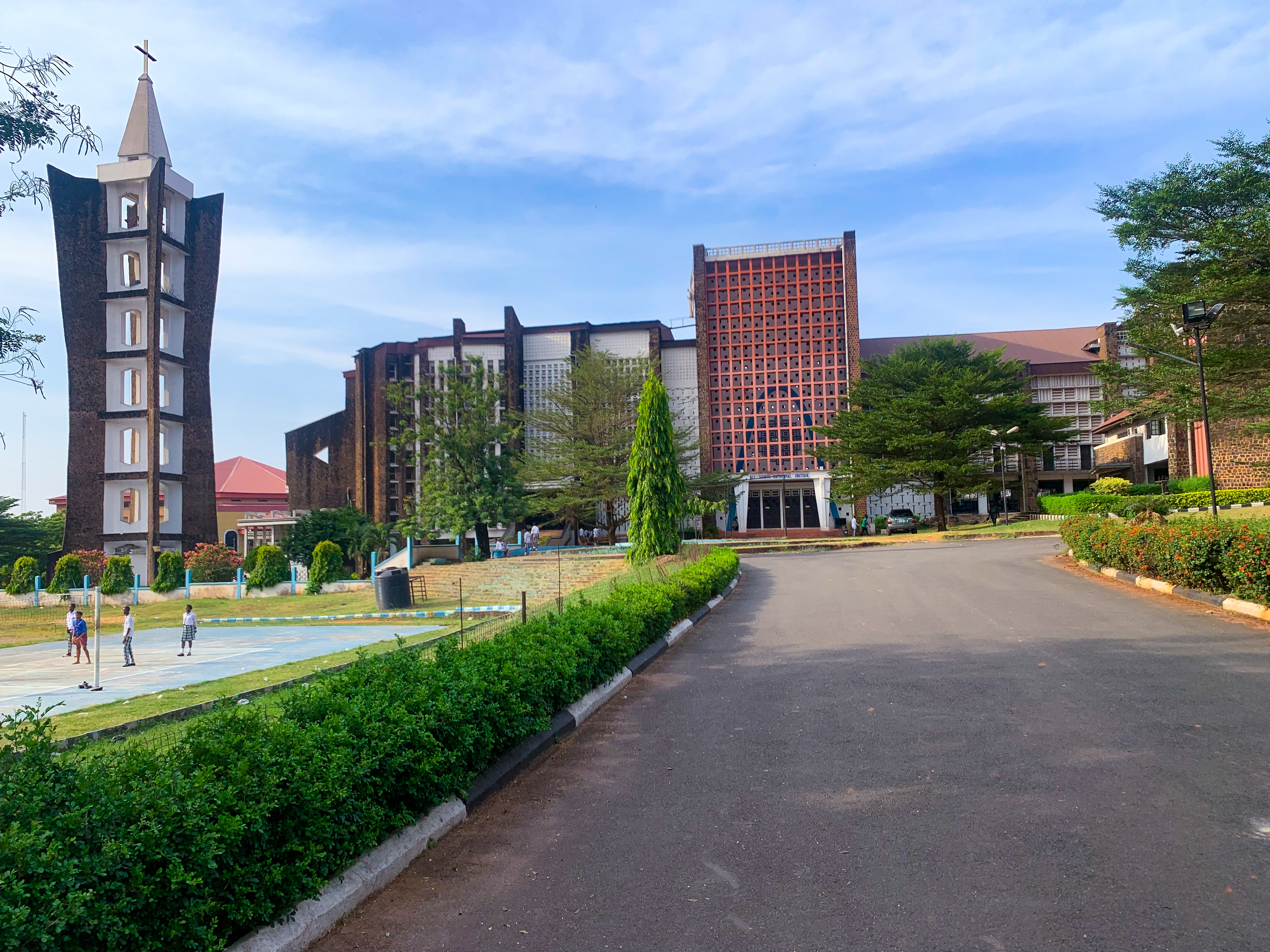
The front facade of the main church

All Saints' Cathedral is an Anglican cathedral in Onitsha, Anambra State, Nigeria. It serves as the seat of the Anglican Diocese on the Niger. The construction of the cathedral began in 1949. It was eventually completed and was dedicated on 1 November 1992.

George Carey, the then Archbishop of Canterbury preached a sermon in the church on 6 February 2001.
