= Richmond Gabriel University =

Vincentian private university

Coordinates: 43°41′08″N 79°34′58″W

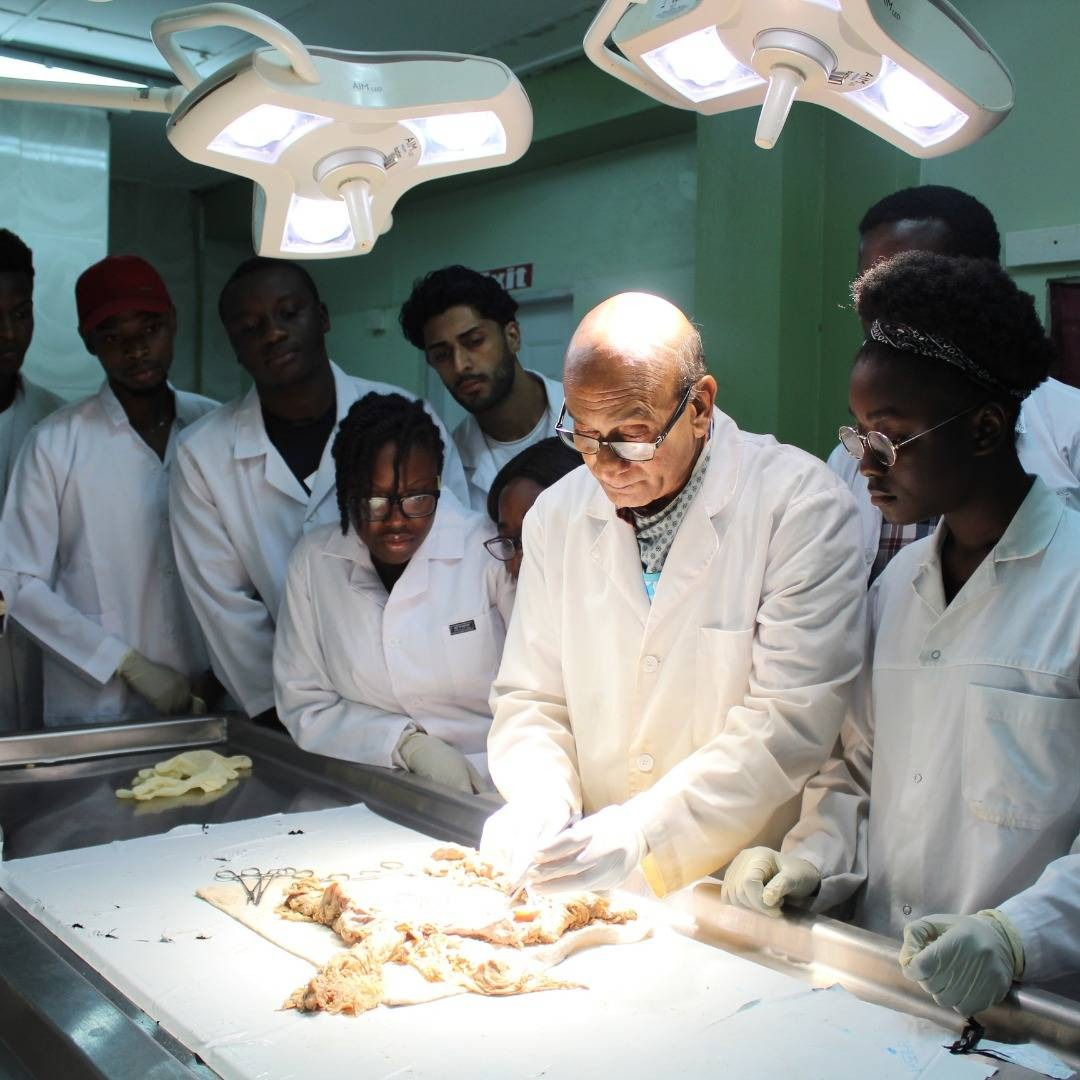
- Type: Private medical school
- Established: 2011
- Language: English
- Website: richmondgu.org

Richmond Gabriel University is a private university located in St. Vincent and the Grenadines in the Caribbean. The university commenced operations in 2011 as All Saints University, College of Medicine, St. Vincent and the Grenadines and was subsequently renamed after a change of management and ownership.

== Location ==
Situated in the eastern Caribbean Sea, Saint Vincent and the Grenadines is an island nation consisting of the primary island, Saint Vincent, along with the northern portion of the Grenadines, a chain of 32 smaller islands and cays—low-lying areas composed of coral or rock. The southern Grenadines fall under the jurisdiction of Grenada. Geographically, Saint Vincent and the Grenadines is characterized by its volcanic and mountainous terrain, with one volcano remaining active to date. Moreover, these islands are predominantly forested, contributing to the nation's lush and diverse ecology.

== Curriculum ==
Medical programs are open to both local and foreign students. Bachelor of Science and Basic Science programs are held in Saint Vincent and the Grenadines, followed by clinical clerkships in ACGME-approved teaching hospitals in the United States and clinical sites throughout Canada, UK and the Caribbean.

== Accreditation ==
Richmond Gabriel University is chartered by the Government of Saint Vincent and the Grenadines and is authorized to confer the graduate and post-graduate degrees, including the degree of Doctor of Medicine (MD), upon students who successfully complete all graduation requirements. The university is accredited by the National Accreditation Board of St. Vincent and the Grenadines and duly registered. Richmond Gabriel University, Saint Vincent and the Grenadines, is recognized by FAIMER and its graduates are eligible to apply for ECFMG Certification and United States Medical Licensing Examinations (USMLE) as a step towards ECFMG Certification. RGU is recognized by the GMC in the United Kingdom making medical graduates eligible to apply to take the qualifying examinations and by the World Health Organization allowing graduates of Richmond Gabriel University to be eligible for practice license in UN-member states. The university is recognized by the MDCN in Nigeria and graduates are eligible to apply to take the council's assessment examination.
