= All Saints University (disambiguation) =

All Saints University is a private university in Uganda.

All Saints University may also refer to:

- All Saints University School of Medicine, in Roseau, Dominica
- All Saints University College of Medicine, Saint Vincent and the Grenadines
- All Saints University of Medicine, former name of Aureus University School of Medicine, Oranjestad, Aruba

== See also ==
- All Saints (disambiguation)
- All Saints College (disambiguation)
