= All Saints Catholic School, Dagenham =

School in Dagenham, England

All Saints Catholic School

Location
- Terling Road; Wood Lane; Dagenham, RM8 1JT; England; 51°33′46″N 0°09′05″E

Information
- Type: Voluntary aided school
- Religious affiliation: Catholicism
- Established: 1992
- Local authority: Barking and Dagenham
- Department for Education URN: 101247 Tables
- Ofsted: Reports
- Head teacher: Clare Cantle
- Gender: Coeducational
- Age: 11 to 18
- Enrolment: 1112
- Website: http://www.allsaintsschool.co.uk

All Saints Catholic School is a Roman Catholic secondary school located on Terling Road, Dagenham in the London Borough of Barking and Dagenham, England.

== Status ==
With around 1100 students, it is the only Catholic voluntary aided comprehensive school in Barking and Dagenham. It is also a training college, receiving the status in 2008, making it one of the first twin colleges.

== History ==
All Saints School developed in 1989 as a result of the merging of two older schools: "Bishop Ward Roman Catholic Boys School" and "Sacred Heart Roman Catholic Convent School for Girls". Bishop Ward School, which had opened in 1954, was originally mixed-gender until, in 1962, girls' education was broken off into a separate school located in Goresbrook Road. The new "All Saints School" therefore reversed this earlier division, recombining pupils on the Bishop Ward site in Terling Road, while also combining teaching staff, some of whom were already working across both sites by the time of the merger.

In 1994, All Saints became one of the UK's first Technology Colleges, as part of a set of policy initiatives that would later be termed as the specialist schools programme.

== Performance ==
Results at Bishop Ward were poor, with an atmosphere that the then headteacher, Desmond Smith, described as "depressed and violent". Following the appointment of Smith as the last headteacher of Bishop Ward in 1984, and as the first headteacher of new All Saints in 1989, results steadily improved until - in 2003 - All Saints School was considered "the second most improved school in England". The March 2003 Ofsted report summarised the situation: "The school has many very good features. Strategies adopted by the headteacher and governors have led to overall GCSE results rising faster than the national trend for some years, culminating in well above average results in 2002". However, the inspectors also noted that the school's strategy led to several subjects of the National Curriculum not being taught to all pupils in Years 10 and 11. In addition, National Curriculum music provision remained under resourced.

Improvements continued and in the report of 6 June 2007 inspection Ofsted rated the school as Grade 1 ("Outstanding"), stating that "the school provides its students with an outstanding education. Standards are high and students achieve extremely well as a result of excellent teaching. The leaders and managers believe that each child is important and this maxim is at the heart of their decision making. There is a clear vision and a hunger for improvement building on the school's record of outstanding success." However, the school recognises the need to extend some aspects of its provision for the 14–19 age group including improving the guidance in the sixth form.

== Cash for peerages ==
Since January 2006, while headmaster at the school, Smith has been notorious for making the indiscreet remarks that triggered the Cash for Peerages scandal. At the end of the 2005–06 academic school year Smith retired and was replaced by the Deputy Head Teacher Kevin Wilson.
