= All Saints Catholic Secondary School =

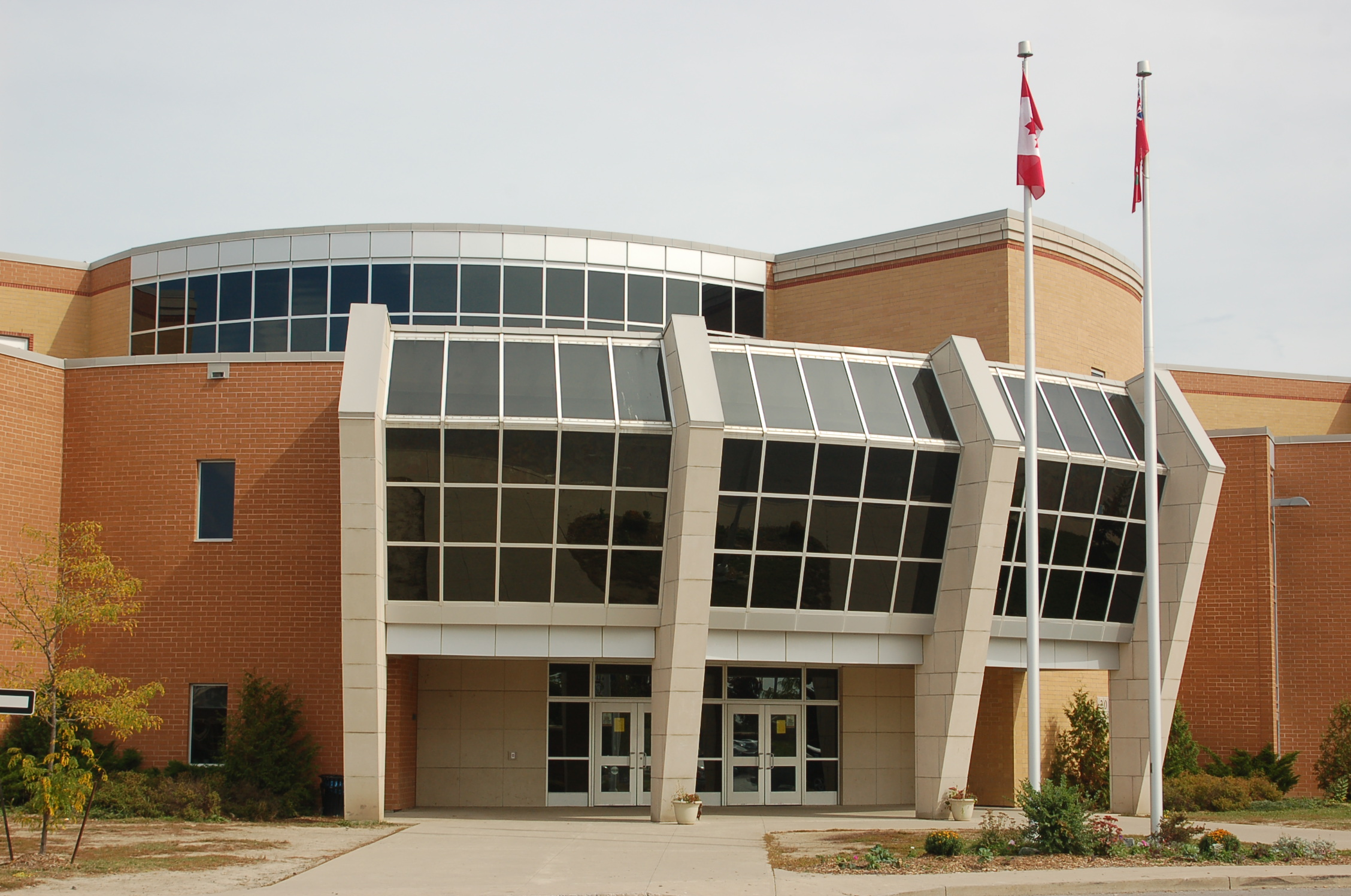

Location
- 3001 Country Lane; Whitby, Ontario, L1P 1M1; Canada; 43°53′42″N 78°57′56″W

Information
- School type: Public, Separate high school
- Religious affiliation: Catholic
- Founded: 2001
- School board: Durham Catholic District School Board
- Superintendent: Gerry O'Reily
- Area trustee: Mary Ann Martin; Scott Murdock
- School number: 685984
- Principal: Janel Langstaff-Mullett
- Grades: 7–12
- Enrolment: 1,055 (2019/2020)
- Language: English
- Colours: █ █ █ Maroon, silver, and blue
- Mascot: Titan
- Website: allsaints.dcdsb.ca/en/index.aspx

All Saints Catholic Secondary School is a secondary school located in Whitby, Ontario, Canada open for students in grades 7–12. It offers a broad range of academic programs including Ontario Youth Apprenticeship Program (OYAP), Cooperative Education (Co-Op), Specialist High Skills Major (SHSM), Advanced Placement (AP), Head Start, Centre for Success/Reconnect, and Electronic learning. It is adjacent to Donald A Wilson Secondary School.

== Notable alumni ==
- Zack Greer, lacrosse player
- James Neal, NHL hockey player
- Cole Perfetti, NHL hockey player
- Mark Suknanan, Drag Queen

== See also ==
- Education in Ontario
- List of secondary schools in Ontario
