= Lady's Workbox, 1808 =

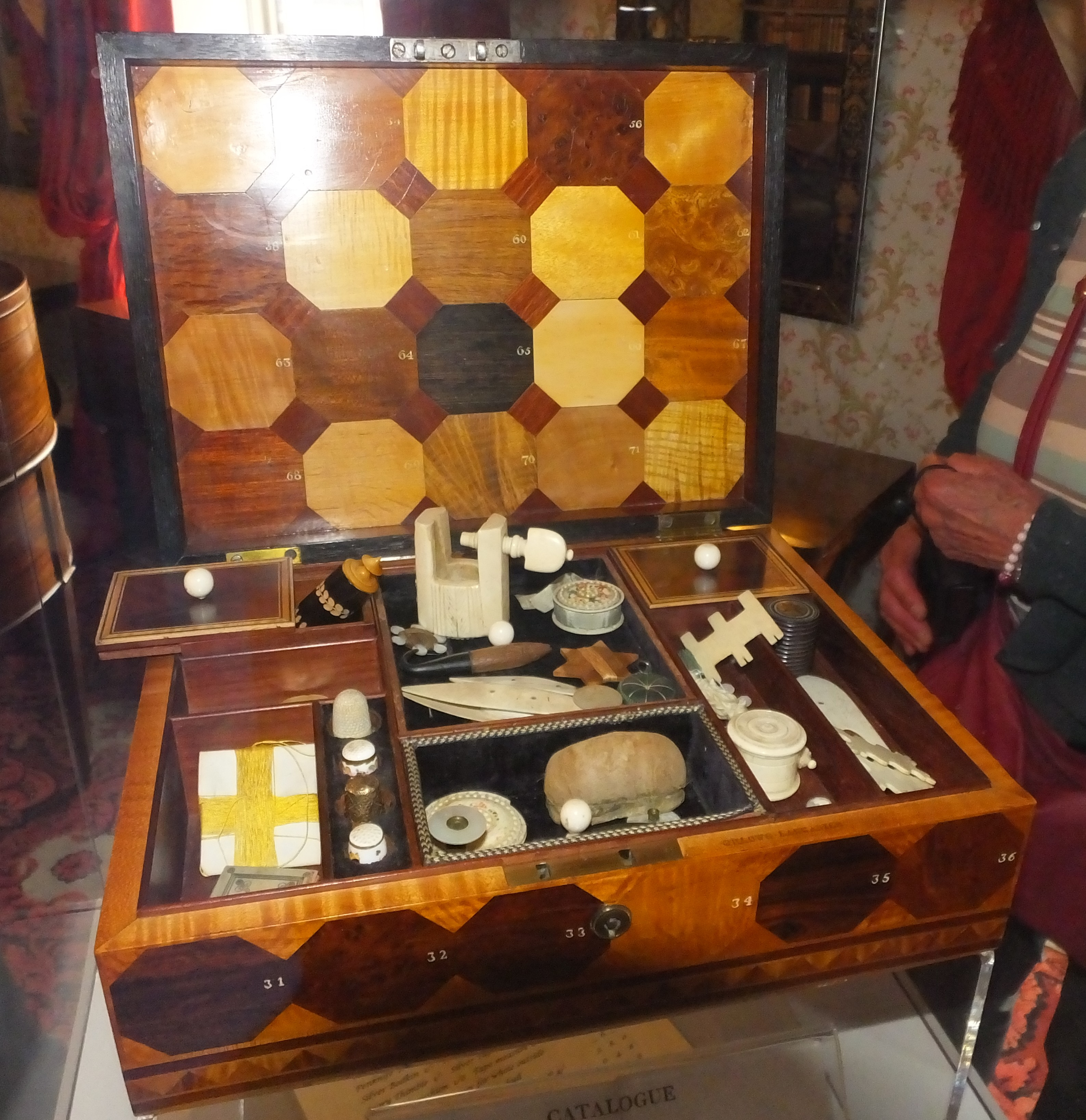
The workbox as given to Elizabeth Gifford

The Lady's workbox in the Judges' Lodgings Museum, Lancaster, was made in 1808 in Lancaster by Gillows (trading as Robert Gillow and Brothers).

It is documented in the Gillow Estimate Sketchbooks in 1808. The recipient was Miss Elizabeth Gifford of Nerquis Hall. The workbox is decorated with 72 'rare and curious woods'. The craftsman was Francis Dowbiggin, son of Thomas Dowbiggin.

== Gillows ==
Gillows, also known as Gillow & Co., was a furniture making firm based in Lancaster and London. It was founded in Lancaster in about 1730 by Robert Gillow (1704-1772). The Robert Gillow of the box would be the founder's grandson, Robert [iii] Gillow, whose brothers George [ii] Gillow; and Richard [iii] Gillow joined the family firm. Gillows was owned by the family until 1814.

As a result of Lancaster's Atlantic triangular trade, much timber was imported from the Caribbean. However, the port was going into decline about the time the box was made. Lancaster was barred from taking part in the slave trade in 1799 and the slave trade was abolished in the British Empire in 1807.

== The marquetry ==
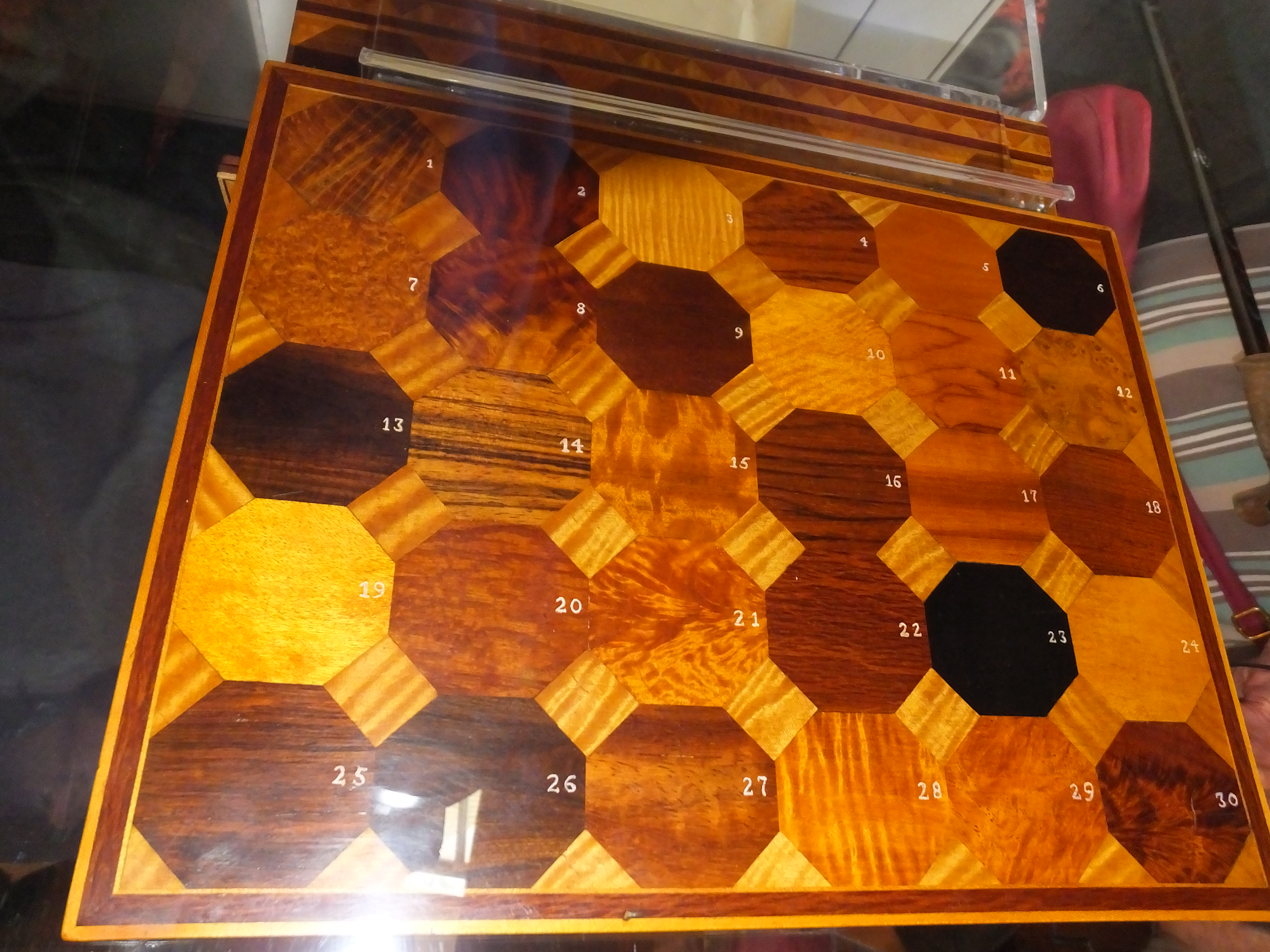
The top of the lid showing 25 specimens.

The workbox is decorated with marquetry using 72 "rare and curious woods". The interest is twofold, firstly it gives samples of 75 types of woods giving their 18th century names, and secondly it gives an insight into the woods then available in Lancaster.

Catalogue of the Specimens of Curious Woods (English and Foreign) Introduced in a W0RK- BOX, made for Miss GIFFARD, of Nerquis, by ROBERT GILLOW and BROTHERS, of Lancaster, in August, 1808.

1. English Oak
2. Spanish Mahogany
3. Sycamore
4. Tulip Wood
5. Sandal
6. Partridge Wood
7. East India Yew
8. Zebra
9. Orange Wood
10. Jamaica Satinwood
11. King Wood
12. Dutch Elm
13. Iron Wood
14. Guietiety
15. Manganiel
16. Rose Wood
17. East India Satinwood
18. Caracoa
19. Canary Wood
20. Botany Bay Wood
21. Yellow Sander
22. Casuarina Wood
23. Black Ebony
24. Holly
25. Brown Ebony
26. Green Ebony
27. Angola Wood
28. Tamarind Wood
29. Amboyna Wood
30. Purple Wood
31. Gambia Wood
32. English Yew
33. Snake Wood
34. St Johns Wood
35. Guiana Wood
36. Ceylon Wood
37. Havannah Wood
38. English Pear Tree
39. Brazils Wood
40. Nova Scotia Wood
41. Calmandra
42. Camphire Wood
43. English Maple
44. Mangrove
45. Grove Wood
46. Mill Wood
47. Italian Walnut
48. Wood Sandford
49. Cape Wood
50. Honduras Satinwood
51. Kangaroo Wood
52. English Apple Tree
53. Box
54. Brown Box
55. Air wood
56. American Yew
57. American Maple
58. Hiccory
59. Plane Tree
60. English Oak, cut from Framing of Lancaster Castle old gates
61. Fustic
62. Mexican Wood
63. Plumb Tree
64. Poplar Tree
65. Moss Oak
66. White Ebony
67. Manilla
68. Barr Wood
69. American Beech
70. Dutch Oak
71. English Beech
72. English Ash

Savacue Wood, Parama wood and Orange Wood were used to frame the samples
