= List of museums in Lancashire =

This list of museums in Lancashire, England contains museums which are defined for this context as institutions (including nonprofit organizations, government entities, and private businesses) that collect and care for objects of cultural, artistic, scientific, or historical interest and make their collections or related exhibits available for public viewing. Also included are non-profit art galleries and university art galleries. Museums that exist only in cyberspace (i.e., virtual museums) are not included.

Name	Image	Town/City	District	Type	Summary
Astley Hall Museum and Art Gallery		Chorley	Chorley	Multiple	Historic house with exhibits of local history, art gallery, period rooms
Bacup Natural History Society Museum		Bacup	Rossendale	Local	local history, culture
Bancroft Mill Engine		Barnoldswick	Pendle	Technology	Working steam mill engine for a textile mill
Blackburn Museum and Art Gallery		Blackburn	Blackburn with Darwen	Multiple	Local and social history, fine art, decorative arts, South Asian culture, beetle collection, textile industry
British Commercial Vehicle Museum		Leyland	South Ribble	Transportation	Automobiles, buses, lorries
British In India Museum		Nelson	Pendle	History	history of the British in India, includes photographs, uniforms, swords, model soldiers, paintings, Indian army cap badges and buttons
Brooks Collectables Toy Museum		Blackpool	Blackpool	Toy	YouTube article, die-cast model cars and vehicles, toys, model trains, cameras, toy soldiers
Carnforth Heritage Visitor Centre		Carnforth	City of Lancaster	Local	local history, area railway heritage, filming of Brief Encounter; located in Carnforth railway station
Chapel Gallery		Ormskirk	West Lancashire	Art	website, local public art gallery, contemporary art and craft from across the UK
Clitheroe Castle		Clitheroe	Ribble Valley	Multiple	12th-century motte and bailey castle with museum of local and social history, art, history of the castle, geology, archaeology, natural history, folklore and industry
Colne Heritage Centre		Colne	Pendle	Local	local history
Cottage Museum, Lancaster		Lancaster	City of Lancaster	Historic house	Webpage , Georgian period cottage
Ditchburn Jukebox Museum		St Anne's	Fylde	Local	website, The history of the first British Jukebox, built on the Fylde Coast.
Fleetwood Museum		Fleetwood	Wyre	Local	Local history, culture, maritime heritage, fishing industry
Fylde Gallery		Lytham	Fylde	Art	Friends site, local art collection and exhibits gallery, located in Booths Supermarket
Gawthorpe Hall		Padiham	Burnley	Historic house	Operated by the National Trust, Elizabethan house with 19th-century interiors, international collection of needlework, lace and costume
Grundy Art Gallery		Blackpool	Blackpool	Art	Contemporary art exhibits, collections include Victorian oils and watercolours, modern British paintings, contemporary prints, jewellery, Asian ivories, ceramics, photographs and souvenirs of Blackpool
Harris Museum, Art Gallery & Preston Free Public Library		Preston	Preston	Multiple	Local history, archaeology, fine art, decorative art including ceramics and glass, costumes, scent bottles
Haworth Art Gallery		Accrington	Hyndburn	Art	Features collection of Art Nouveau Tiffany glass
Helmshore Mills Textile Museum		Helmshore	Rossendale	Industry	Former textile mills for wool then cloth
Heysham Heritage Centre		Heysham	City of Lancaster	Local	local history, located in a 17th-century long house
Hoghton Tower		Hoghton	Chorley	Historic house	Fortified Tudor manor house, features galleried banqueting hall, period furniture and a doll house collection
Judges' Lodgings, Lancaster		Lancaster	City of Lancaster	Historic house	Adjacent to Lancaster Castle, Georgian house with Gillow furniture displayed in Regency period room settings, fine art, and the Museum of Childhood with toys, dolls, games and playthings from the 18th century to the present
King's Own Royal Regiment Museum		Lancaster	City of Lancaster	Military	Located in the Lancaster City Museum
Lancashire Infantry Museum		Preston	Preston	Military	Located in Fulwood, regimental history and memorabilia
Lancashire Police Museum		Lancaster	City of Lancaster	Police	Located in Lancaster Castle, museum of the Lancashire Constabulary
Lancaster Castle		Lancaster	City of Lancaster	History	Medieval castle, court and prison
Lancaster City Museum		Lancaster	City of Lancaster	Local	City's history, social history, King's Own Royal Regiment Museum, fine art
Lancaster Maritime Museum		Lancaster	City of Lancaster	Maritime	Shipbuilding, harbour trades, merchant trading, fishing, social and natural history of the bay, local ports
Leighton Hall		Yealand Conyers	City of Lancaster	Historic house	18th-century Georgian house with 19th-century Gothic exterior, Gillow furniture, gardens
Lytham Hall		Lytham	Fylde	Historic house	18th-century Georgian country house and 78-acre parklands
Lytham Heritage Centre		Lytham	Fylde	Local	local history and art exhibits, operated by Lytham Heritage Group
Lytham Windmill Museum		Lytham	Fylde	Mill	19th-century windmill with exhibits about the mill, millers, local history and culture
Madame Tussauds Blackpool		Blackpool	Blackpool	Wax	
Museum of Lancashire		Preston	Preston	History	County history, culture, life in World War II, military history
Pendle Heritage Centre		Barrowford	Pendle	Local	Local and social history, culture, art, visitor centre
Peter Scott Gallery		Lancaster	City of Lancaster	Art	website, art gallery of Lancaster University's Lancaster Institute for The Contemporary Arts, collections include 20th-century art, Pilkington's Tile and Pottery Company works, Chinese and Japanese art, and antiquities
Platform Gallery		Clitheroe	Ribble Valley	Art	contemporary crafts gallery
Queen Street Mill Textile Museum		Burnley	Burnley	Industry	Operational 19th-century steam-powered weaving mill
Ribble Discovery Centre		Lytham	Fylde	Natural history	website, ecology and natural history of the Ribble and Alt Estuaries, operated by the Royal Society for the Protection of Birds
Ribble Steam Railway		Preston	Preston	Railway	Heritage railway, museum open on operating days
Ribchester Roman Museum		Ribchester	Ribble Valley	Archaeology	website, area Romano-British history and artifacts
Ripley's Believe It or Not!#United Kingdom		Blackpool	Blackpool	Amusement	Located at Pleasure Beach Blackpool
Rufford Old Hall		Rufford	West Lancashire	Historic house	Operated by the National Trust, 16th-century Tudor great hall where young William Shakespeare once performed; collections of furniture, arms, armour and tapestries; gardens
Ruskin Library		Lancaster	City of Lancaster	Biographical	Part of the University of Lancaster, exhibits from its collections of pictures, books, manuscripts and photographs relating to the Victorian writer and artist John Ruskin
Samlesbury Hall		Samlesbury	South Ribble	Historic house	Restored medieval manor house
South Ribble Museum and Exhibition Centre		Leyland	South Ribble	Local	website, local history, culture, art exhibits, textile, rubber and motor industries
Towneley Hall		Burnley	Burnley	Multiple	Exhibits include natural history, Egyptology, local history, textiles, decorative art and regional furniture, and an art gallery
Turton Tower		Chapeltown	Blackburn with Darwen	Historic house	Tudor house reflecting Tudor and Victorian eras
Weaver's Cottage		Rawtenstall	Rossendale	Historic house	18th-century weaver's cottage with working hand looms, Victorian kitchen, operated by the Rossendale Civic Trust
Weavers' Triangle		Burnley	Burnley	Industry	Includes the visitor center with Victorian schoolroom and weaver's dwelling, canal toll house, and Oak Mount Mill Engine House
The Whitaker		Rawtenstall	Rossendale	Multiple	website, local history, fine art, natural history, period Victorian rooms, fashion and furniture, art exhibits; formerly the Rossendale Museum & Art Gallery
Whitworth Museum		Whitworth	Rossendale	Local	local history, operated by the Whitworth Historical Society
Woodend Mining Museum		Reedley Hallows	Pendle	Mining	information, area coal mining
Yorkshire Dales Mining Museum - Earby		Earby	Pendle	Mining	lead mining artifacts

== Defunct museums ==
- Lewis Textile Museum, Blackburn, closed in 2006, collections now part of Cottontown at Blackburn Museum and Art Gallery
- Mid Pennine Gallery, Burnley, closed in 2010
- National Football Museum, Preston, closed in 2010 and will reopen in 2011 in Manchester
- Steamtown Carnforth, Carnforth, closed in 1997

== See also ==
- Category:Tourist attractions in Lancashire
