= Covelli =

Covelli may refer to:

- Covelli Center, arena in Columbus, Ohio, United States
- Covelli Centre, arena in Youngstown, Ohio, United States

== People ==
- Covelli Crisp (Coco Crisp; born 1979), American professional baseball player
- Frankie Covelli (1913–2003), American boxer
- Alfredo Covelli (1914–1998), Italian politician
- Emilio Covelli (1846–1915), Italian anarchist
- Nicola Covelli (1790–1829), Italian chemist and mineralogist

== See also ==
- Covel (disambiguation)
- Covell, a surname
- Covellite (or covelline), a copper sulfide mineral
- Sparganothina covelli, a species of moth
