= Covell =

Covell is a surname. Notable people with the surname include:

- Charlie Covell (born 1984), British actress, writer and producer
- Daniel Covell (born 1970), American professional wrestler
- John Collins Covell (1823–1887), American educator and school administrator
- Louis Chapin Covell (1875–1952), American military officer and salesman
- Luke Covell (born 1981), Australian-New Zealand professional rugby league footballer
- Phyllis Covell (1895–1982), English tennis player
- Ralph Covell (1911–1988), English architect
- Roger Covell (born 1931), Australian musicologist, critic and author
- Thomas Covell (c. 1561–1639), keeper of Lancaster Castle and mayor of Lancaster six times
- William Covell (died 1613), English clergyman and writer
- Ralph R Covell (1922–2013), American missionary to China and Professor of Missions

== See also ==
- Covell, Illinois, unincorporated community in Dale Township, McLean County, Illinois, United States
- Covell, former name of Easton, California
- Covel (disambiguation)
