= Judges' Lodgings, Lancaster =

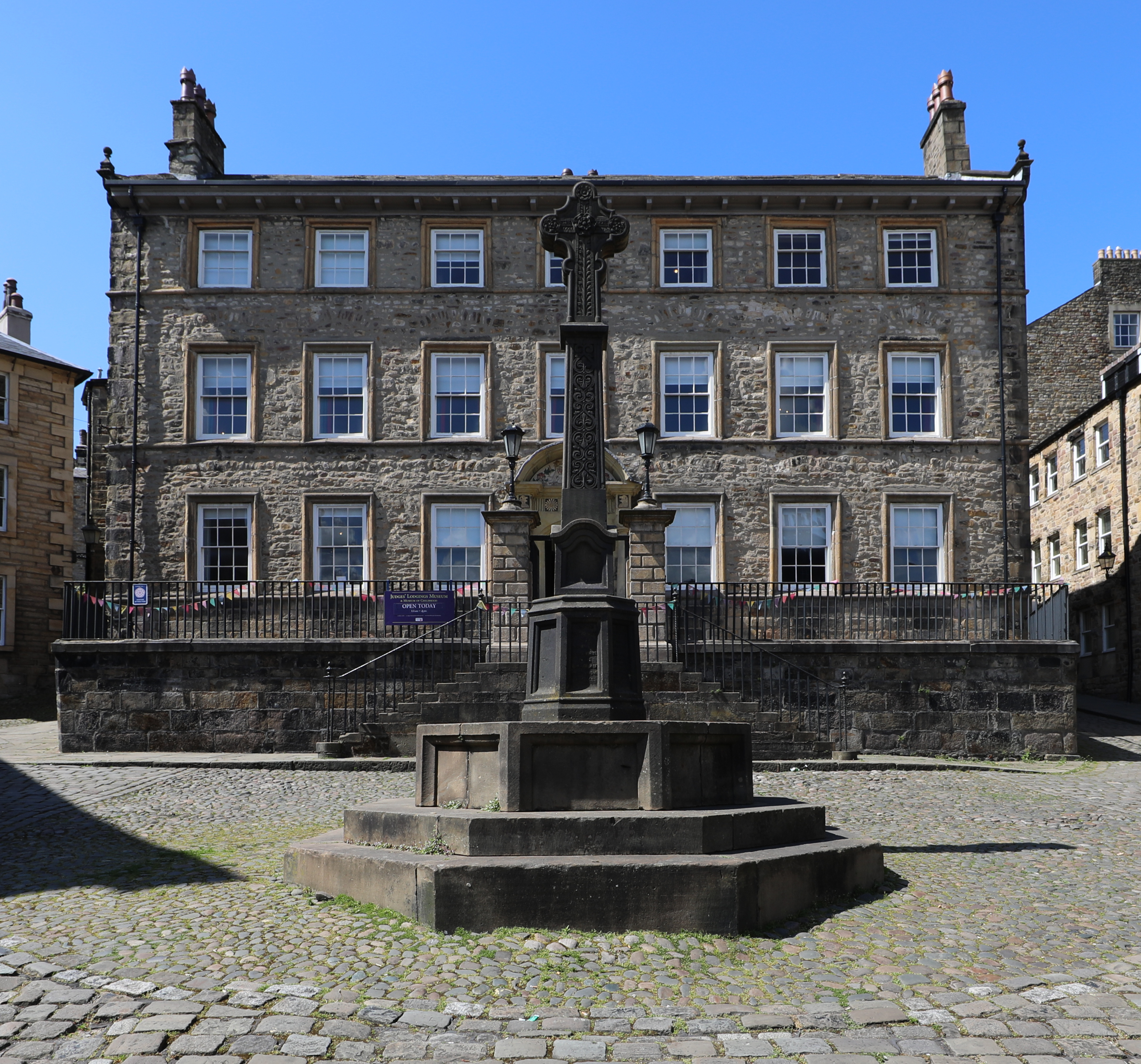
- Entrance front of the Judges' Lodgings

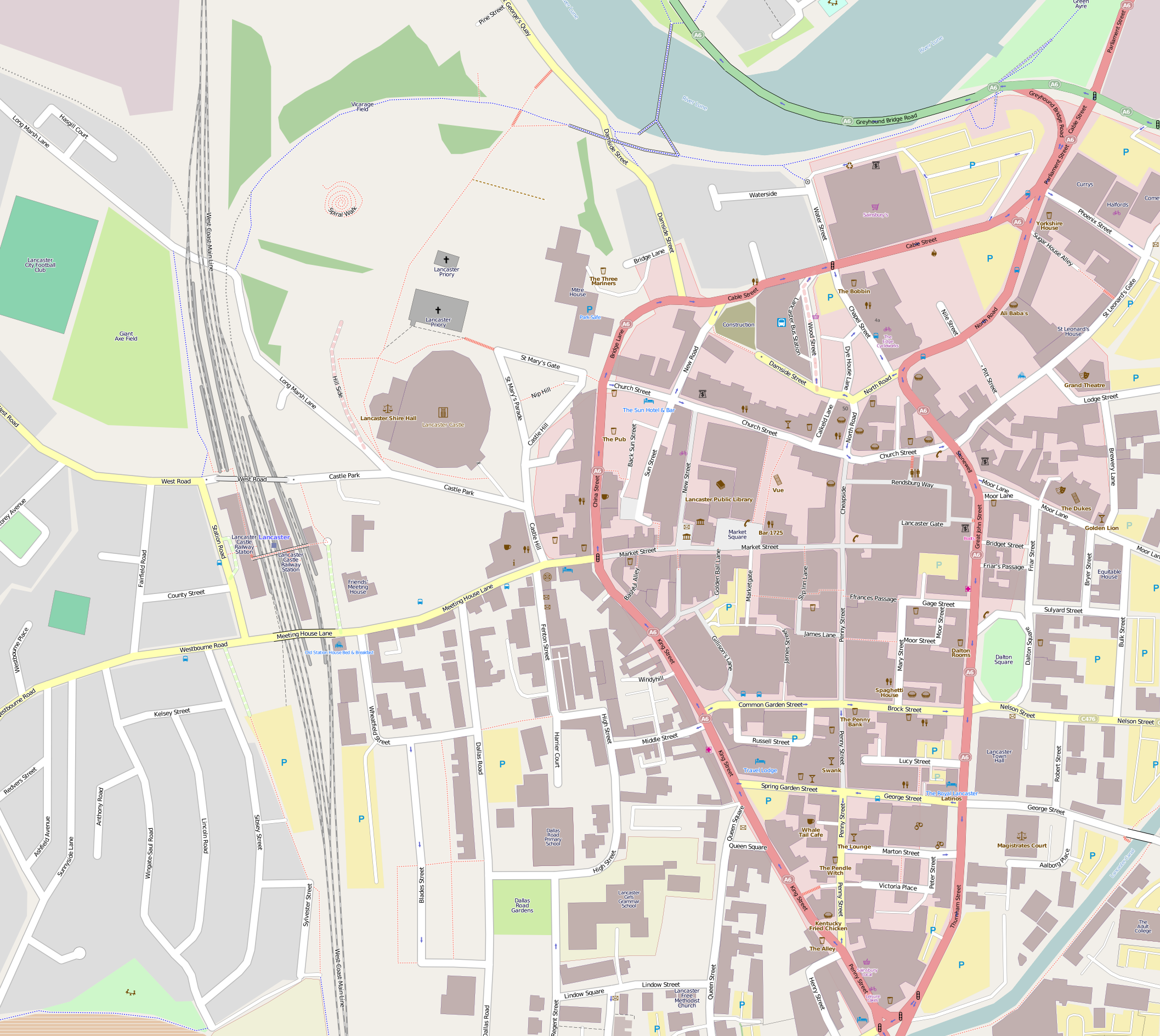
- Location in Lancaster
- 54.0502°N 2.8036°W
- Location: Castle Hill/Church Street, Lancaster, Lancashire, England

Site notes
- Architectural style: Georgian
- Restored by: SD 475 619

Listed Building – Grade I
- Designated: 22 December 1953
- Reference no.: 1298414

The Judges' Lodgings, formerly a town house and now a museum, is located between Church Street and Castle Hill, Lancaster, Lancashire, England. It is recorded in the National Heritage List for England as a designated Grade I listed building. The building is the oldest existing town house in Lancaster, and was also the first house in Lancaster to have shutters. It was used by judges when they attended the sessions of the Assize Court.

Use of the house by visiting judges ended in 1975, and the building was converted into a museum; featuring a museum of childhood, and the Gillow furniture collection. The future of the museum was put in doubt, following an announcement from Lancashire County Council that it would be closed permanently. Closure was initially proposed to take place on 31 March 2016, but it was deferred. In April 2018 it was announced the museum would open to the general public between Easter and the end of October 2019. In 2025 the museum was open to the public four days a week from April to November.

== History ==
=== Previous buildings ===
There is evidence that older buildings have stood on the site. The remains of a Roman kiln were discovered in the garden. It is likely that the first house on the site was built in wood, and later replaced in stone. It is possible the house built in 1314 for Robert de Holland was on this site. The oldest fabric in the present house dates from the 1550s: In the entrance hall is a massive stone fireplace of that date.

=== Current building ===
The building was constructed around 1625, re-using structural timbers and possibly on an earlier foundation. By 1639 the house was owned by Thomas Covell, Mayor of Lancaster, and Keeper of Lancaster Castle. That building has been called the "Old Hall" of Lancaster. For many years the house was used as lodgings by visiting judges attending the Assizes court at Lancaster Castle. There is evidence that the house was used for this purpose as early as 1635.

Lancaster was severely damaged by Royalist forces in 1643 during the Civil War. Around 1662 the property was bought by Thomas Cole, Deputy Lieutenant of Lancashire. The building was extended and altered in 1675, and the new building was called "New Hall".

The house was sold in 1826 to the county magistrates. Following this an extension was added to the side of the building, and other alterations were made. Use of the house by visiting judges ended in 1975, and the building was converted into a museum. This includes a Museum of Childhood, and a collection of furniture made by the Lancaster firm of Gillows (later Waring & Gillow).

=== Closure in 2016 ===
In November 2015, in the context of continuing cuts to local council budgets by the second Cameron ministry, Lancashire County Council proposed withdrawing all funding for five museums across Lancashire: the Judges' Lodgings, Fleetwood Museum, Helmshore Mills Textile Museum, Museum of Lancashire and Queen Street Mill. The leader of the council spoke of "the financial challenges facing the county council as we deal with relentless cuts to central government funding combined with rising demand for our services". Despite letters of protest and an on-line petition the council confirmed their decision at a meeting in February 2016 and the Judges' Lodgings was told it would close its doors for the last time on 31 March. A group of concerned citizens formed a "Friends of the Judges' Lodgings" in the hopes of finding a way to allow the museum to continue. In March 2016 the closure of all five museums was deferred until September 2016.

The museum closed on 30 September 2016, along with the other four Lancashire museums mentioned above, except for pre-booked school groups. As of 3 June 2017 Lancashire County Council's website states that "Negotiations are underway with a potential new operator and it is hoped they will be finalised in Autumn 2017." In April 2018 Lancashire County Council announced it would be reopening the museum, alongside Queen Street Mill and Helmshore Textile Mills, to the general public for three days a week over the summers of 2018 and 2019 while talks continued about their futures.

=== 2019 and 2020 ===
In March 2019 Lancaster Judges' Lodgings reopened staffed by a mixture of paid staff and volunteers.

The first season after the reopening saw many visitors both coming from out of town and local residents keen to see the museum open once again. There was a busy programme of events put on by the museum and the Friends which ensured that Judges' Lodgings had a very successful reopening season.

However, many of the events planned for 2020 were put on hold due to the COVID-19 pandemic and the opening was delayed until the end of August 2020. It was announced that the Judges' Lodgings would re-open on 28 August 2020, for pre-booked visits only.

=== 2020s ===
In 2025 the museum was open from 3 April to 16 November, from Thursday to Sunday, 11am -4pm.

== Architecture ==
The building is constructed in sandstone rubble with ashlar dressings and slate roofs. It has a U-shaped plan. The entrance front faces west, is symmetrical, has three storeys and a basement, and is in seven bays. The architectural style is Georgian. The doorcase has Tuscan columns supporting blocks carved with lions' heads, a triglyph frieze containing flowers, and an open segmental pediment containing a painting of the arms of Lancashire.

== Collections ==
=== Gillows Furniture collection ===
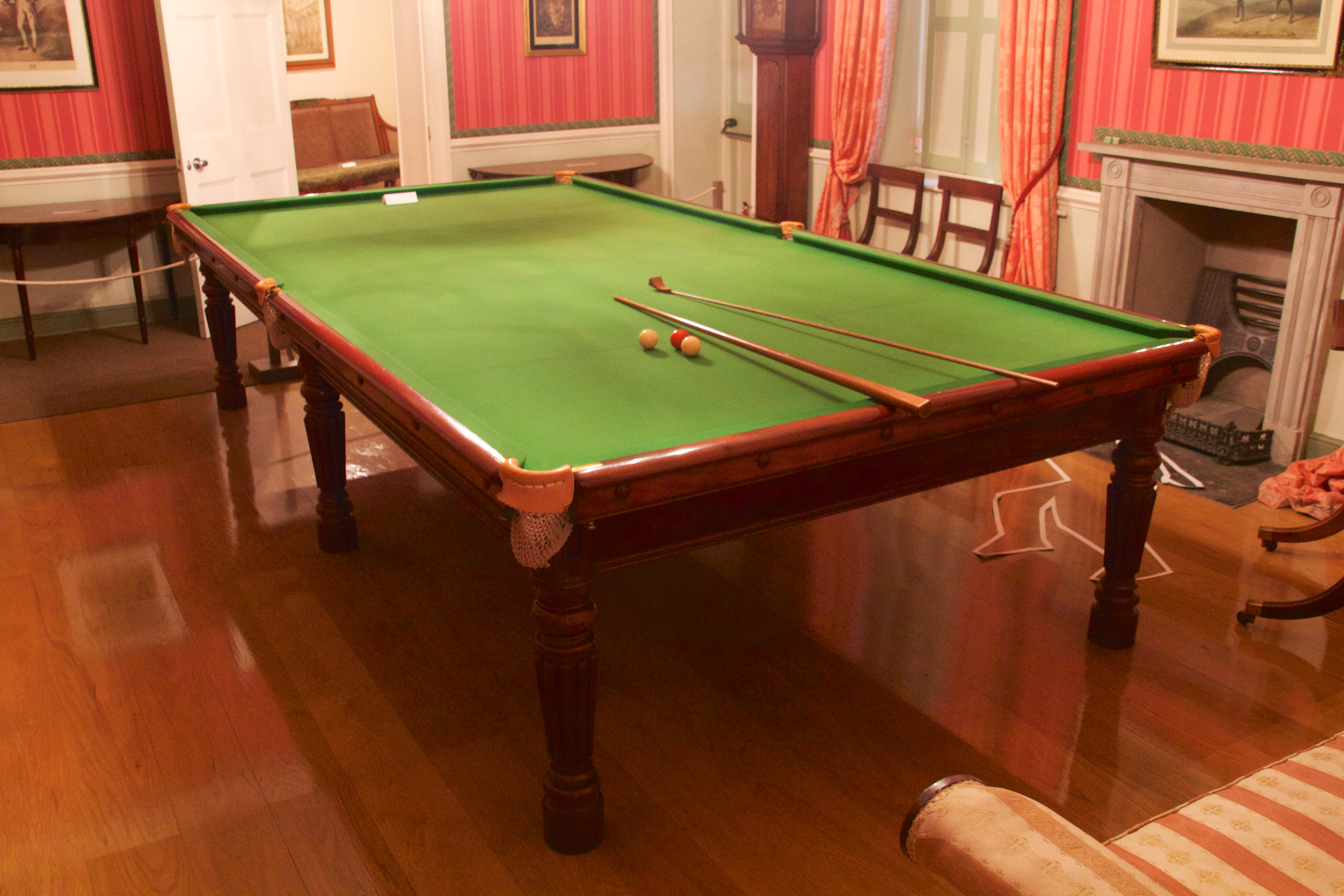
A Regency English billiards table by Gillows at Judges' Lodgings.

The building houses an extensive collection of Gillows furniture, which is partly displayed in the context of a museum of the firm and partly in rooms furnished in period style.

Robert Gillow (1704–1772) started making furniture around 1727, predating Thomas Chippendale by twenty years. He made furniture for the upper middle classes and landed gentry. Robert was succeeded by his sons: Richard managed the Lancaster production, and Robert set up a London operation. As a provincial he was unique in having a London showroom. It was a family business until 1813, when the Gillow family sold the firm to three partners, Redmayne, Whiteside, and Ferguson, who retained the name Gillow & Co. Gillows furniture is referred to by Jane Austen, Thackeray and the first Lord Lytton, and in one of Gilbert and Sullivan's comic operas.

Much of the furniture in the Judges' Lodging was commissioned by specific clients. The firm's Estimate Sketch Books are preserved in Westminster City Archives. They constructed furniture to their own design and nurtured their own designers but equally they would construct furniture for designers without production capacity. They did work for Chippendale, Sheraton and Hepplewhite.

In the 1760s Gillows began producing billiard tables. They have even been credited with inventing the billiard table, although billiards had been played for a long time before the 1760s. They are also credited with patenting the "telescopic" (extendable) dining table and building the first Davenport desk.

By 1900, the firm was producing a complete interior decoration service but this strained the company's finances - and it was taken over by Waring of Liverpool in 1903. Waring & Gillow continued but never achieved the same reputation for quality. They folded in 1962, and the Lancaster workshops closed.

In war time, they built wings and propellers for the de Havilland DH9 and parts of the Mosquito.

==== Bruce James Talbert ====
During the 1860s and 70s, Gillows employed the Gothic Revivalist designer Bruce James Talbert (1838–81). The firm produced many items of furniture to Talbert's designs, including two sideboards from around 1872, on display at the Judges' Lodgings.

In 1867, Talbert wrote Gothic Forms Applied to Furniture, Metal Work and Decoration for Domestic Purposes, this work proved to be influential on the commercial production of furniture. Talbert recommended framed construction, decorative inlay and low-relief carving. Another recommendation was the use of large, flat metal hinges. Talbert's work was displayed at numerous international exhibitions, including the International Exhibition of 1873, and his designs in the Medieval and Jacobean styles were produced by many cabinet making firms. His designs tended to be highly detailed, including bold geometric inlaid patterns, intricately carved squares of boxwood and rows of small turned spindles. Some pieces included a carved verse with a moral message.

In the sideboards at the Judges' Lodgings, one of which is known as the Dundee Cabinet, produced by Gillows to Talbert's designs, his characteristic carved squares, geometric designs and rows of spindles are clearly evident.

The Dundee Cabinet is made of stained baywood with inlaid panels of thuya and boxwood. The item is stamped Gillows of Lancaster. An identical piece to this cabinet is illustrated in an entry dated 8 March 1872 in Gillows' Estimate Sketch Book. The drawing is annotated Inlaid bird panel as before, therefore it appears that a similar cabinet had been made previously. An elaborated version of the cabinet appeared in Talbert's Examples of Ancient and Modern Furniture, published in 1876.

The sideboard displayed in the butler's pantry is made of oak with panels of boxwood.

=== Paintings ===
==== English Paintings ====
On display in the museum are some notable works by George Romney. Romney, who was born in the Furness district of what was then Lancashire, relocated to London in the 1760s but remained in contact with Lancashire, painting the local gentry and buying picture frames from Gillows. A portrait of Abraham Rawlinson, MP for Lancaster in the 1780s, hangs in the entrance hall: it was acquired in 2006. There are also portraits by Joseph Wright of Derby and Sir Thomas Lawrence.

==== French paintings ====
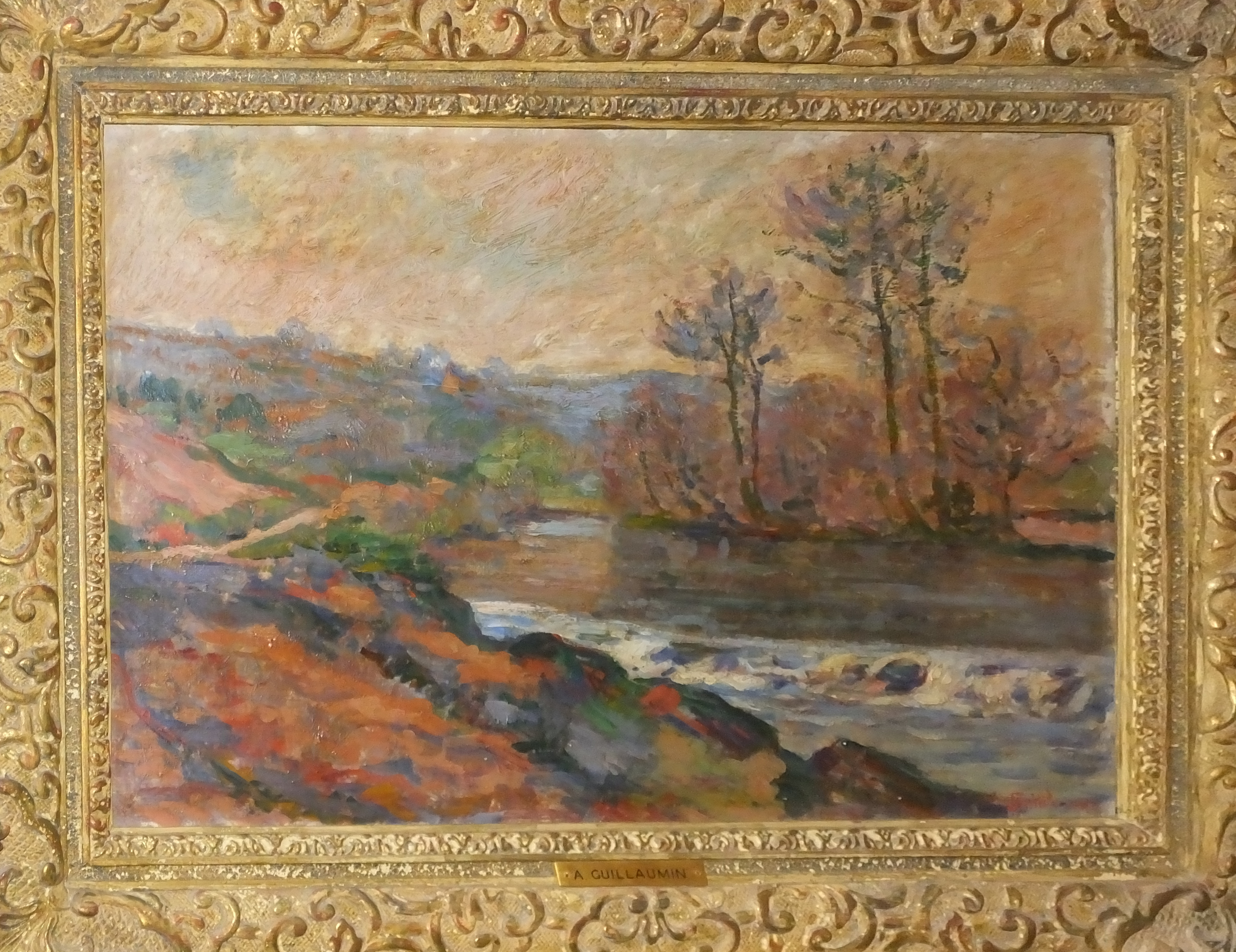
The Creuse at Genetin, Armand Guillaumin

There is a collection of six French paintings, the Lionel Hewlett bequest. This includes two landscapes by the impressionist Armand Guillaumin, one of the river Creuse and another of the Île de Ré, showing the influence of the artist's friend Van Gogh.

=== Museum of childhood ===
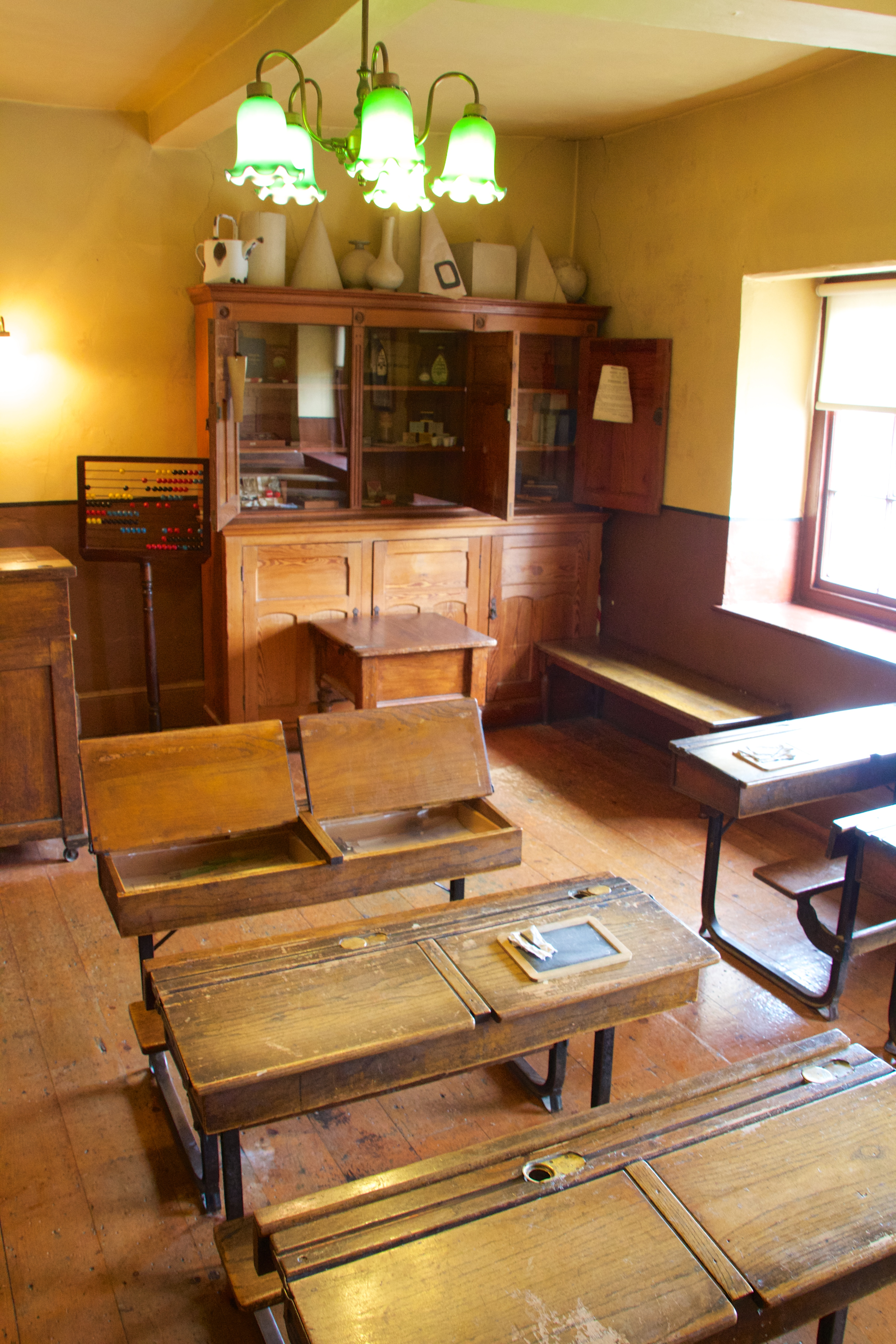
Classroom

The displays include a nursery with spectacular 3 seater rocking horse and a reconstructed classroom. The center of the collection is the Barry Elder collection of dolls purchased for the museum in 1976. It includes examples of peg dolls, pressed felt dolls by Lenci, poured wax dolls, bisque porcelain dolls and composition dolls by Armand Marseille, Simon & Halbig and S.F.B.J. In the display cabinets are doll's houses, Lego, Meccano and some Hornby railway trains.

== See also ==
- Grade I listed buildings in Lancashire
- Listed buildings in Lancaster, Lancashire
