= Lancashire Police Museum =

Museum in Lancaster, England

Lancashire Police Museum is the museum of the Lancashire Constabulary, in Lancaster, England. It is housed within Lancaster Castle in A Wing of the former HM Prison Lancaster, and opened in June 2022. It comprises 16 displays, shown in the former prison cells.

The museum welcomed its 40,000th visitor in May 2024, and won a Judges' Commendation in the 2024 Lancashire Tourism Awards, in the "Small visitor attraction" category.
