= Thomas Covell =

17th century magistrate

- Born: c. 1561
- Died: August 1, 1639; Judges' Lodgings, Lancaster
- Resting place: Lancaster Priory
- Occupation(s): Mayor of Lancaster, Magistrate, Coroner, Keeper of the Castle
- Spouse: Dorothy Watson
- Children: Elizabeth Covell (born 1601)

Thomas Covell (c. 1561 – August 1, 1639) was the keeper of Lancaster Castle for 48 years and mayor of Lancaster six times. He is known for jailing the Pendle witches.

== Biography ==
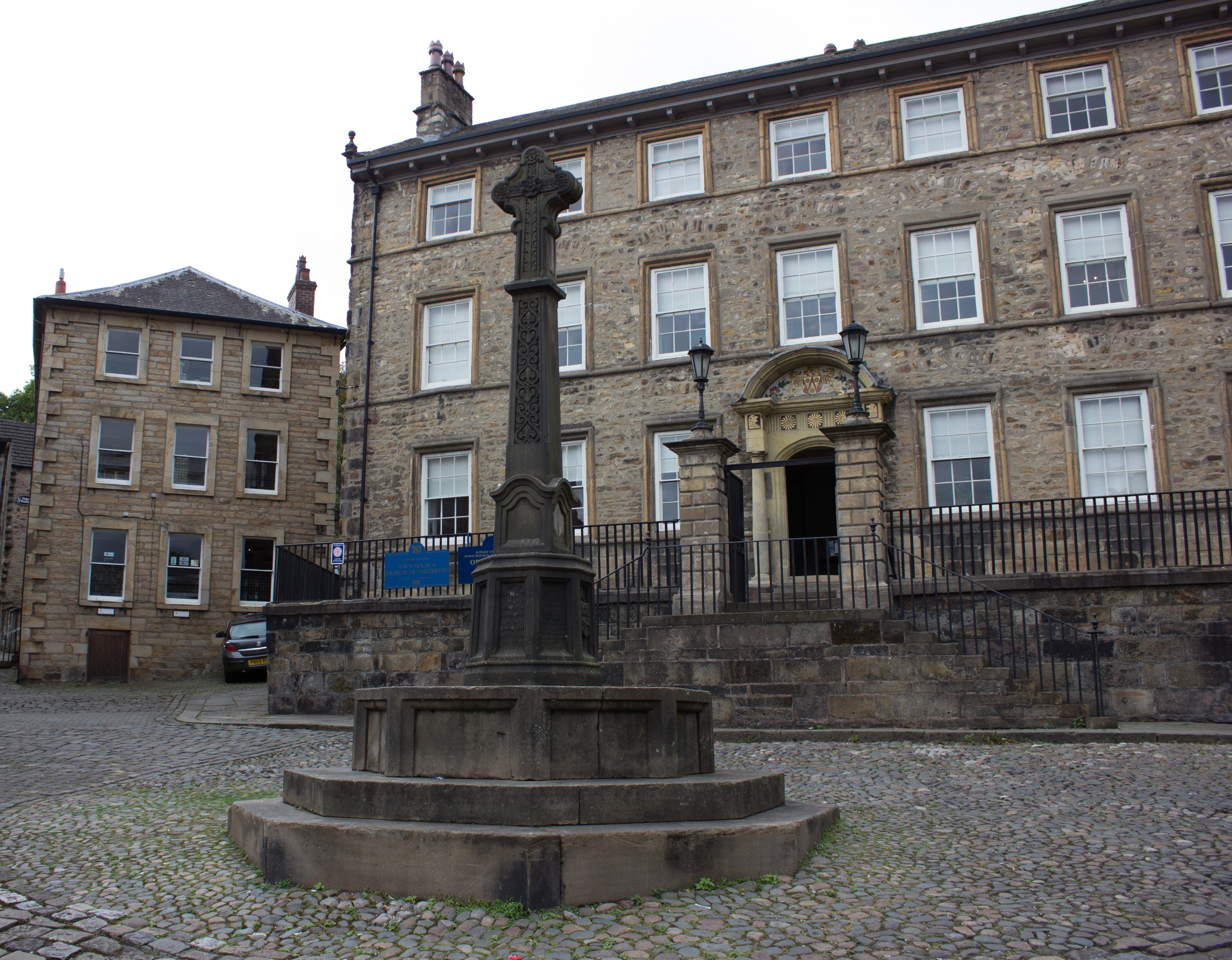
The Covell Cross outside Judges' Lodgings in Lancaster is named after Thomas Covell.

=== Career ===
Thomas Covell was well known in Lancaster during the 17th Century. He held a number of positions in the city including magistrate, coroner, keeper of Lancaster Castle, and mayor of the city.

Covell was keeper of Lancaster Castle for 48 years, from 1591 until his death. Whilst keeper of the castle he would have been responsible for the Pendle witches' time there. He was also Mayor of Lancaster six times during his life, though the only known years are 1621 and 1628, and a coroner for 46 years from 1593.

=== Personal life ===
Covell married Dorothy Watson, with whom he had one daughter named Elizabeth in 1601. There are records of the birth of a son named Phillip, but no further information is available on him.

He built Judges' Lodgings in Lancaster where he lived at the time of his death on August 1, 1639. Covell had made his will the day before his death, asking to be buried in Lancaster Priory. At the time of his death the value of the goods in his inventory totalled £3047, and he also owned a number of properties. Buried in the church's chancel, a brass memorial was also fixed to the floor.
