= Fleetwood Museum =

Municipal building in Fleetwood, Lancashire, England

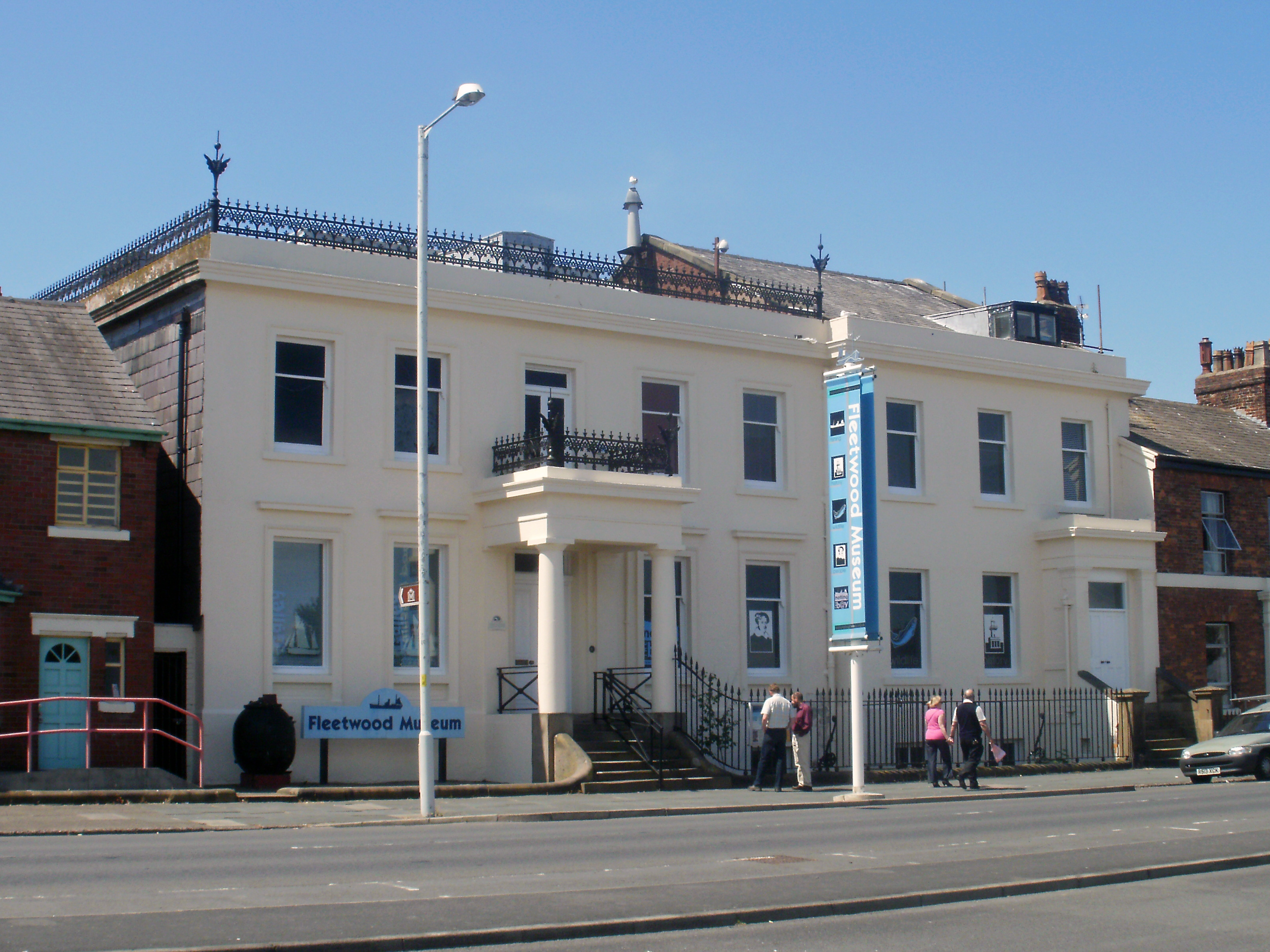

- Location within Fleetwood
- 53.9247°N 3.0058°W
- Location: Fleetwood, Lancashire, England

History
- Built: 1836

Site notes
- Architect: Decimus Burton
- Architectural style: Neoclassical style

Listed Building – Grade II
- Official name: Wyre Borough Treasurer's and Borough Housing Departments
- Designated: 31 March 1978
- Reference no.: 1072398

Fleetwood Museum is a local history and maritime museum in the English seaside town of Fleetwood, Lancashire. The museum was originally the town's Customs House and, completed in 1836, was one of the first buildings constructed in Fleetwood. Like much of the town, it was designed by architect Decimus Burton. The building became the local town hall and is now a maritime museum. It has been designated a Grade II listed building by Historic England.

== History ==
Fleetwood was planned by local landowner Peter Hesketh-Fleetwood, who employed Decimus Burton to lay out the town and design many of the buildings. Hesketh-Fleetwood intended his town to be a major port, and Burton designed the Customs House as one of the first buildings, completed in 1836. In 1876, it became the private residence of Alexander Carson, who extended the building to the north, and named it "Wyre Holm"; the customs offices were transferred to another building on the same terrace. The building became Fleetwood Town Hall in 1889. The building continued to serve as the meeting place of Fleetwood Urban District Council from its formation in 1894, and remained as such after the area was advanced to the status of municipal borough in 1933, but ceased to be the local seat of government after the formation of the enlarged Wyre Borough Council at Poulton-le-Fylde in 1974. It subsequently served as the offices of the Borough Treasurer and the Borough Housing Director of Wyre Borough Council before, for a short time, being occupied by a private school and, in 1992, becoming Fleetwood Museum.

On 31 March 1978, Historic England designated the building Grade II listed. The Grade II designation—the lowest of the three grades—is for buildings that are "nationally important and of special interest".

== Architecture ==
Fleetwood Museum is on two storeys. It is built of sandstone, rendered with roughcast lime plaster. The front façade has eight ranges of sash windows. The building is accessed from the front through two porticos. Both entrances are at the top of stone staircases and flanked by columns—the south entrance by round Doric columns and the north entrance by square columns. Between the two staircases there are iron railings with spear-shaped finials.

At the roof line there is a parapet with ornamental iron decoration and corner finials. Below the parapet there is a blocking course and a moulded cornice.

== Harriet ==
The fishing smack Harriet, built in Fleetwood in 1893, was moved to the museum in 1998. It is housed in a purpose-built building behind the main museum building. It is registered as a member of the National Historic Fleet.

== Threatened and actual closures ==
The Fleetwood Museum Trust is a charity established in 2006, with the stated aim "to save Fleetwood Museum from closure".

In November 2015 it was announced that Lancashire County Council would withdraw funding from five of its museums: Fleetwood Museum, Helmshore Mills Textile Museum, Judges' Lodgings, Museum of Lancashire and Queen Street Mill, because of what the leader of the council described as "the financial challenges facing the county council as we deal with relentless cuts to central government funding combined with rising demand for our services". They were initially to close at the end of March 2016 but that month were reprieved until September 2016. Local supporters are opposing the closure, and Fleetwood Town Council agreed in January 2016 to "register an expression of interest" in funding the future of the museum.

The Museum closed on 30 September 2016, along with the other four Lancashire museums mentioned above, except for pre-booked school groups. As of 8 October 2016 the Fleetwood Museum Trust website stated:

Lancashire County Council is withdrawing funding for the museum and is currently looking into a community group taking over the running of the museum. Fleetwood Museum Trust and Fleetwood Town Council are in negotiations with Lancashire County Council in this respect and are hoping to re-open the museum for the new season on 1st April 2017.

At the same date Lancashire County Council's website stated that "Negotiations are underway with a potential new operator."

The museum reopened on 14 April 2017. As of 3 June 2017 Lancashire County Council's website stated that:

The county council will manage the museum until the formal transfer to Fleetwood Museum Trust as the new operator is completed, expected to be no later than the start of June.

The museum was open in 2017, 2018 and 2019, but as of June 2020 it had not reopened because of the COVID-19 pandemic. It reopened in May 2021.

== See also ==
- List of museums in Lancashire
- Listed buildings in Fleetwood
