= Richard Gillow =

English architect and businessman

Richard Gillow (1733–1811) was an English architect and businessman from Lancaster. He was the son of the carpenter Robert Gillow, the founder of Gillows of Lancaster and London, a successful cabinet-making firm.

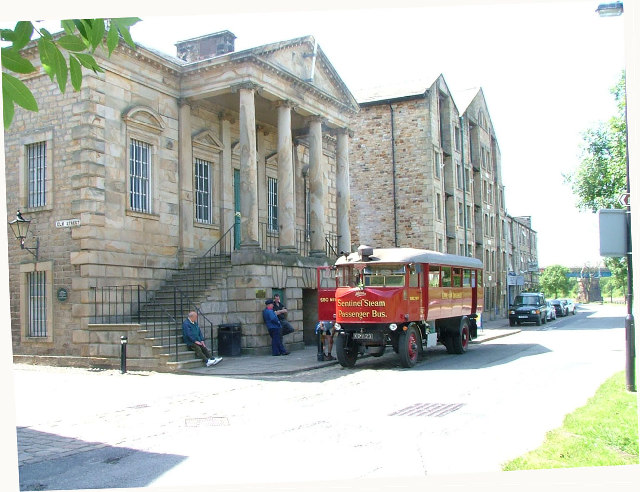
The Custom House Lancaster. Designed by Richard Gillow

Richard trained as an architect in London. In 1757 he became a partner in the family firm, which took the name Robert Gillow & Son. He continued to undertake architectural work, including Lancaster's Custom House of 1764. The building has been described as "a notable and complete example of an eighteenth-century custom house, of Palladian design".

Richard Gillow was designing 'semis' or pairs of houses in that town as early as 1757, in Moor Lane. The earliest identifiable surviving pair is that built in 1759 on Cable Street (now facing the bus station and partly demolished) for Captain Henry Fell and Samuel Simpson.

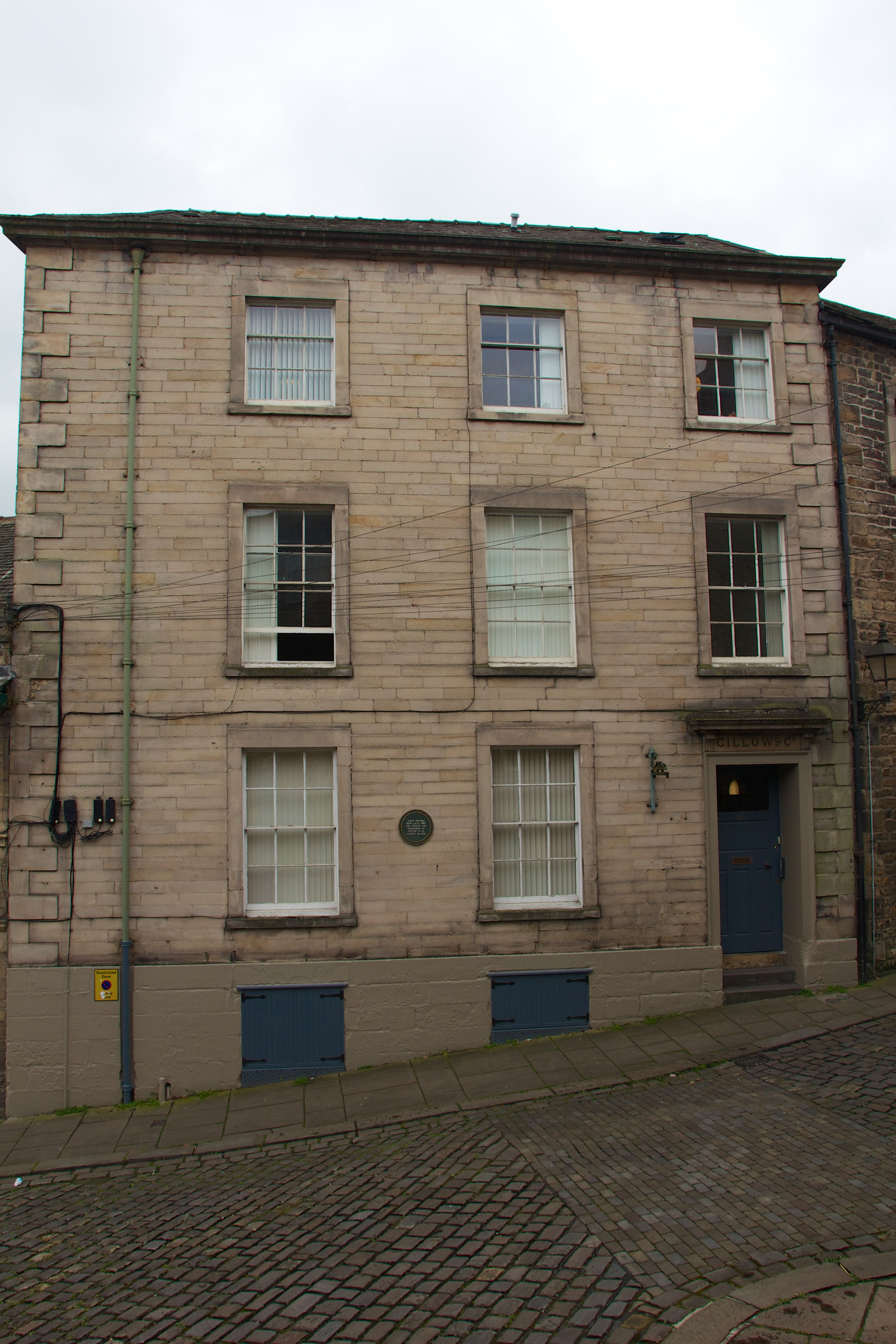
1 Castle Hill c.1770, former offices and workshops of the Gillow firm in Lancaster. Probably designed by Richard Gillow

Richard and his wife Sarah had eight children, five daughters and three sons; Robert [iii] Gillow; George [ii] Gillow; and Richard [iii] Gillow, all joined the family firm.

== See also ==
- Robert Gillow
- Joseph Gillow
- Paulyn Gillow
