= Custom House, Lancaster =

Museum building in Lancashire, England

Custom House
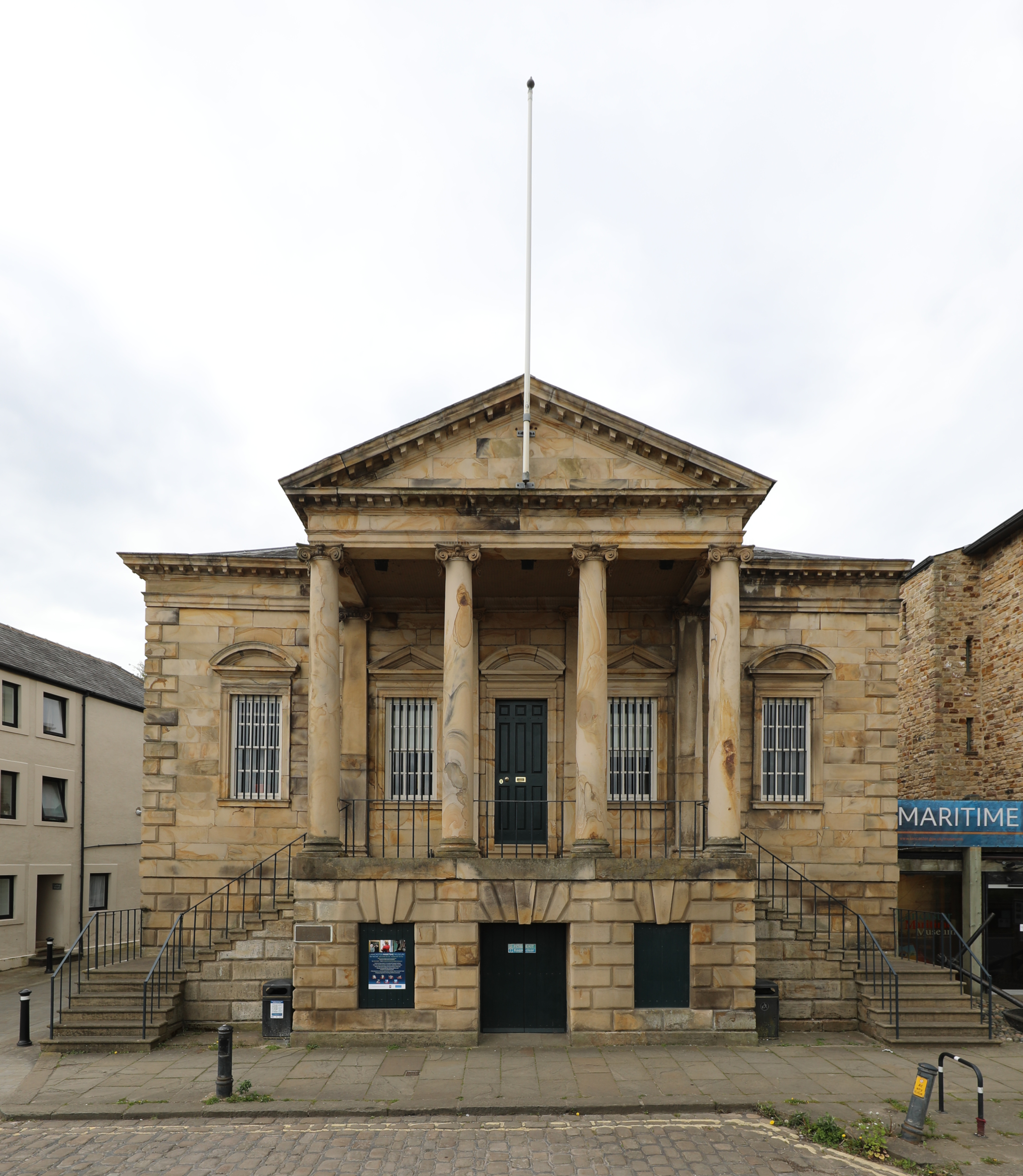
- The front of the Custom House

- Location within Lancaster
- Alternative names: Maritime Museum

General information
- Architectural style: Palladian
- Location: St George's Quay, Lancaster, Lancashire, England
- Coordinates: 54.0537°N 2.8053°W
- Year built: 1764
- Renovated: 1983–84 (restored)

Design and construction
- Architect: Richard Gillow

Website
- www.lancaster.gov.uk/sites/museums/maritime

Listed Building – Grade II*
- Official name: Maritime Museum
- Designated: 22 December 1953
- Reference no.: 1289088

The Custom House is a Grade II* listed building located on St George's Quay in Lancaster, Lancashire, England. The architect was Richard Gillow of the Gillow furniture making family. Designed in 1764 for the Port Commissioners, it was used for its original purpose until 1882 when the Customs were transferred to Barrow-in-Furness.

== Lancaster Maritime Museum ==
The Custom House has housed the Lancaster Maritime Museum since 1985. Adjacent to the Custom House is a later bonded warehouse, which forms part of the Maritime Museum.

The museum's exhibits include local fishing vessels, ship models, area merchants and trade, including the slave trade, the Lancaster Canal, area fishing industry, the development of the local ports of Glasson, Heysham, Sunderland Point, and Morecambe, and the social and natural history of Morecambe Bay.

== See also ==
- Grade II* listed buildings in Lancashire
- Listed buildings in Lancaster, Lancashire
- Sandside, Beetham
