= Covel =

Covel may refer to:

== People ==
- John Covel (1638–1722), Master of Christ's College, Cambridge
- Michael Covel, author and film director
- Sean Covel (b. 1976), American film producer
- Toby Keith, born Toby Keith Covel, (1961–2024), American country musician

== Places ==
United States

- Covel, former name of Easton, California

== See also ==
- Covell (disambiguation)
