= Gillows of Lancaster and London =

English furniture-making firm

Coordinates: 54.0500°N 2.8035°W

Gillows of Lancaster and London, also known as Gillow & Co., was an English furniture making firm based in Lancaster, Lancashire, and in London. It was founded in Lancaster in about 1730 by Robert Gillow (1704–1772).

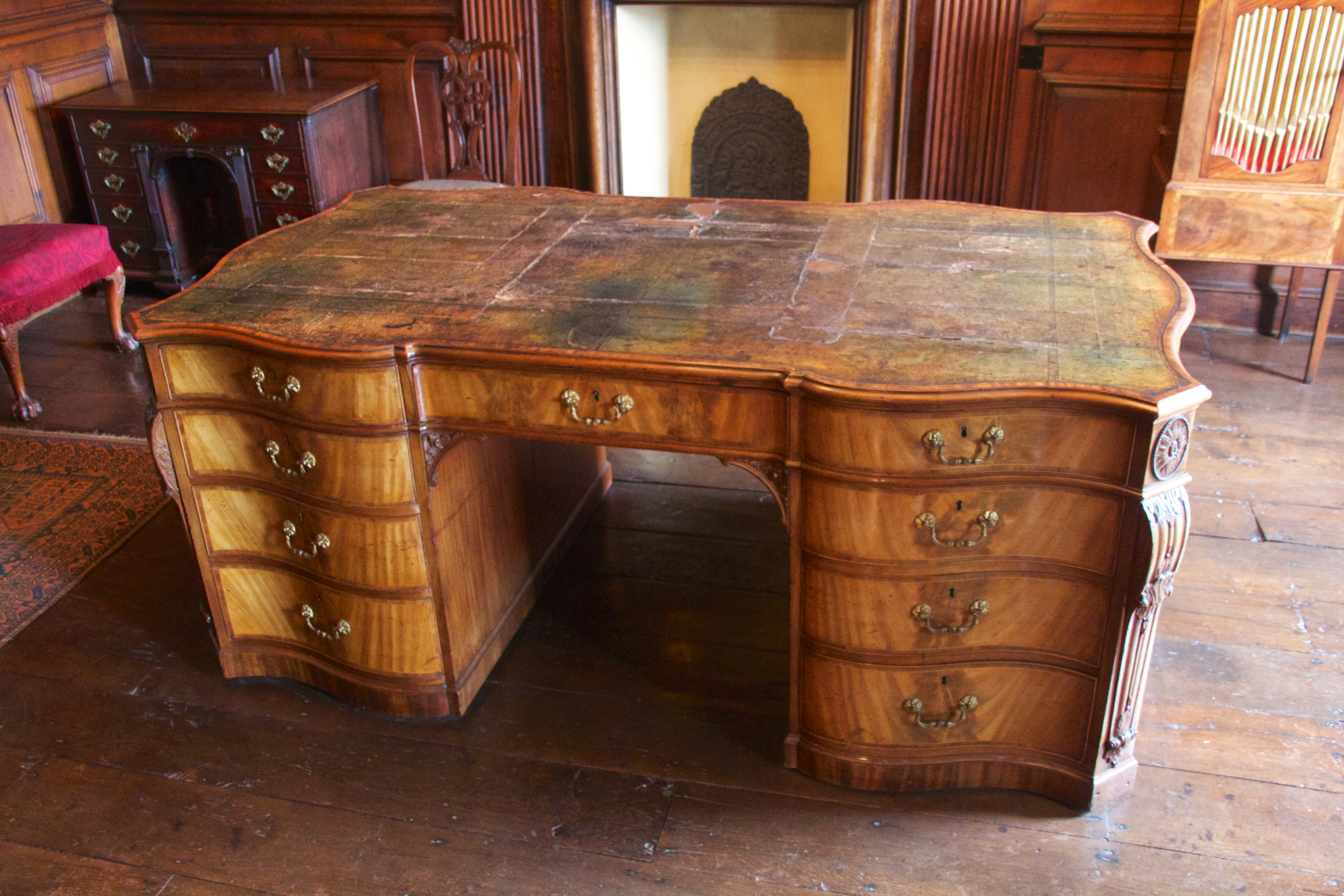
Library table, made by Gillow to a Chippendale design, on display in the Judges' Lodgings, Lancaster.

Gillows was owned by the family until 1814 when it was taken over by Redmayne, Whiteside, and Ferguson; they continued to use the Gillow name. Gillows furniture was a byword for quality, and other designers used Gillows to manufacture their furniture. Gillows furniture is referred to by Thackeray and the first Lord Lytton, and in one of Gilbert and Sullivan's comic operas. (Note: H.M.S. Pinafore (1878): Josephine, Captain Corcoran's daughter, sings of "papa's luxurious home" full of "rich oriental rugs, luxurious sofa pillows, and everything that isn't old, from Gillows".) In 1903 Gillows merged with Warings of Liverpool to become Waring and Gillow and although the furniture remained of a high quality it was not as prestigious.

== History ==
By the mid-18th century the firm was one of the leading cabinet-makers in Lancaster. They had a reputation for manufacturing very high quality furniture. By the end of the 1700s most of the firm's partners were based in London. The firm merged with a Liverpool firm in 1897 to form Waring & Gillow.

=== Gillow family (1728–1814) ===
In 1728 Robert Gillow began trading in Lancaster as a joiner, builder, house carpenter, furniture maker and overseas merchant. By the summer of 1731 he had entered into a partnership with a fellow catholic, George Haresnape, which had ended by 1735. By 1734 six other names appeared on their staff list. Gillows notably made heavy use of mahogany wood, which is indigenous to the Americas, from the early 1730s. In the early 1740s, Gillow owned a twelfth share of the ship Briget, which he partially used to import mahogany from the West Indies. The success of the firm was partly due to his ability to directly import mahogany; by 1742 Gillow was exporting finished mahogany furniture back to the West Indies.

On 1 January 1757 Robert entered into an equal partnership with his son Richard Gillow (1733–1811), and the firm was known as Robert Gillow & Son. Richard was also the architect for several buildings in Lancaster. He financed the building of the Catholic church in Dalton Square, Lancaster in 1798. The family's Catholic history (Note: Robert Gillow's father had been imprisoned in Lancaster Castle during the 1720s for hiding a priest) was important in building up a customer base within Lancashire's gentry, and their subsequent purchase of Leighton Hall, Lancashire from a cousin in 1822. On 31 December 1768 Robert Gillow I retired and left his share of the firm to his other son, Robert Gillow II (1747–1795). In 1769 and 1770, a shop at 176 Oxford Street, London, was sent up by the brothers' cousin, Thomas Gillow (1736–1779), to sell their furniture. (Gillow & company's London branch remained on this site until 1906, when the newly-merged Waring & Gillow built a new store nearby; Selfridges now stands on the site of the vacated store).

By 1775 the Lancaster branch had 42 employees, and by 1789 there were about 50 employees.

=== Leonard Redmayne, Whiteside, and Ferguson (1814–1897) ===
By 1814 the firm had been taken over by a partnership of Leonard Redmayne, Whiteside, and Ferguson; they continued to use the Gillow name. Redmayne was mayor of the City of Lancaster in 1824, and then in 1826 he became the first chairman of the Lancaster Banking Company, a position he held until 1860. The Lancaster Banking company, after a series of acquisitions and mergers would eventually form part of NatWest, who still occupy the original Lancaster Banking Company building. Under the direction of Redmayne, Whiteside, and Ferguson the company expanded from furniture design and bespoke manufacture to being an interior design company that would manufacture furniture and supply other manufacturers products. They were the largest company of its type outside London, where they maintained showrooms and workshops. They had a solid reputation for quality.

The company won commissions to furnish and decorate public buildings in Australia, South Africa, India, Russia, Germany, France and the United States. It provided furniture for aristocratic houses, such as Tatton Hall, where some 150 extant pieces complement the work of the architect Lewis William Wyatt. Details of the commissions can be found in the Pattern Books in the Gillow archives.

By 1897, they were over extended and formed an informal partnership with Warings of Liverpool. In 1903 they were bought out by Warings and the two companies became Waring & Gillows.

=== Waring & Gillows (1903–1990) ===
Waring and Gillow marked their work using a brass plate instead of stamping the piece: in the merger they lost their reputation for quality. The company survived by fitting out luxury liners until health and safety concerns reduced the use of wood on-board ships. They made Art Deco furniture. In 1953 they were taken over by Great Universal Stores and the Lancaster workshops closed. In 1980 Maple & Co. merged with Waring & Gillow to form Maple, Waring & Gillow, which became part of the Allied Maples Group in 1990.

== Legacy ==
Pieces of Gillow furniture can now be seen in museums in London, Leeds, Adelaide, Melbourne, and Auckland, as well as a collection in the Gillow Museum in the Judges' Lodgings, Lancaster. The furniture can also be seen in houses open to the public such as Tatton Park.

=== Gillow Archive ===
The Gillow archives are one of the largest and longest collection of records of any cabinet-maker to have survived. The Gillow pattern book was never published, while Thomas Chippendale's published his pattern book in 1754, Hepplewhite (posthumously) in 1788 and Sheraton in 1791; Gillows would supply pieces in any of these styles. The archive includes their sketches and detailed estimates written in a phonetic north country English.

== People ==
- Robert Gillow I (1704–1772), founded the firm, and retired at the end of 1768.
- Richard Gillow (1733–1811), son of Robert I, trained as an architect, became partner at the start of 1757.
- Robert Gillow II (1747–1795), son of Robert I, became partner at the start of 1769.
- Thomas Gillow (c.1736–1779), son of George Gillow, who was a brother of Robert I, set up London branch of firm.

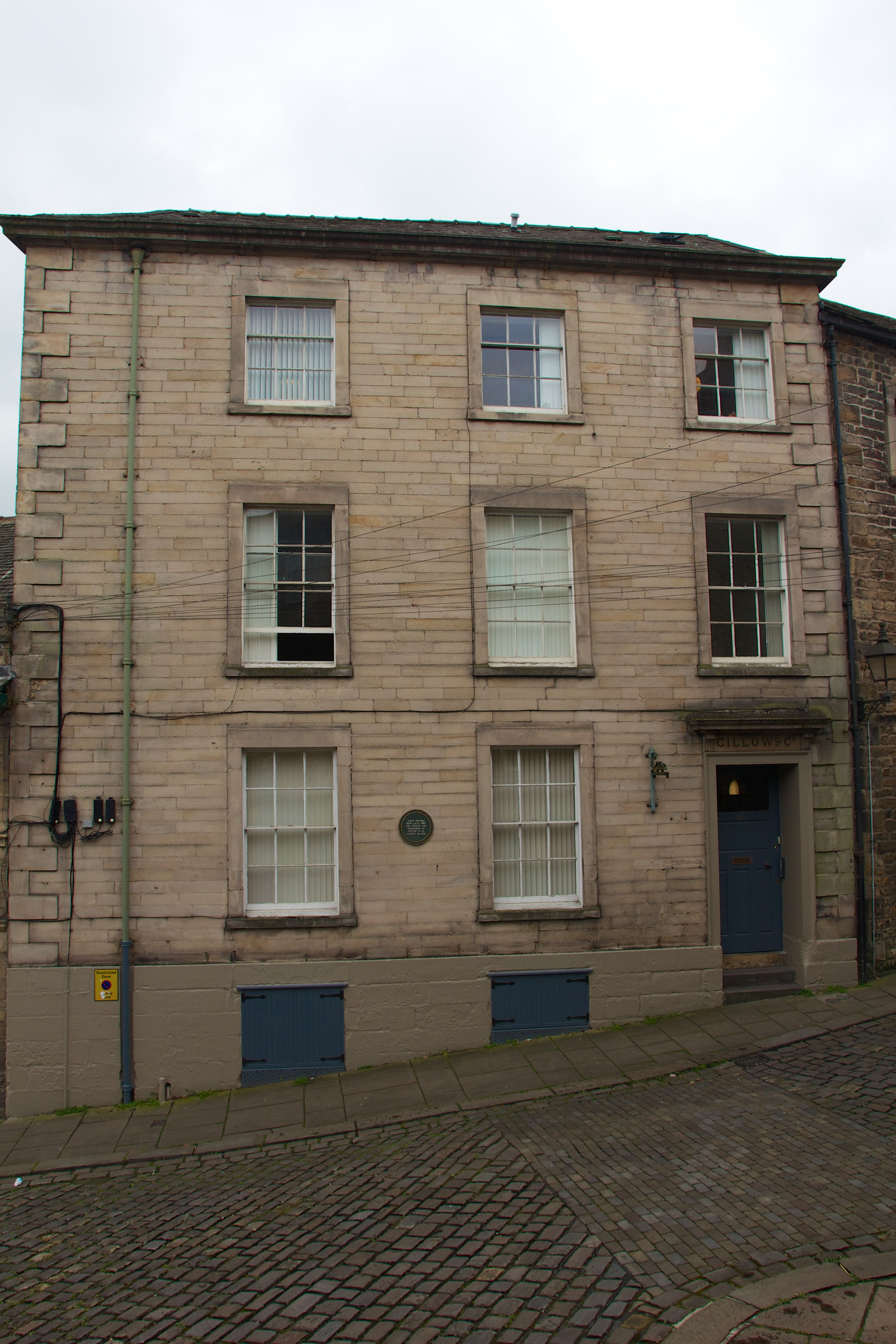
1 Castle Hill, c.1770, the firm's former offices and workshops in Lancaster. Probably designed by Richard Gillow

Between 1731 and 1850 about 137 apprentices were bound almost exclusively to the firm in Lancaster. George Hepplewhite may have started his working life in the 1750s as an apprentice to Robert Gillow.

== Stamps ==
Gillow stamped much of the furniture they produced, although some items were not stamped, for example picture frames.

Dates	Stamp
1770–1780	Gillow and Taylor
1780–c.1850	"Gillows Lancaster"
c.1850–c.1870	"Gillow"
c.1870–c.1890	L, followed by a reference number then, "Gillows Lancaster"
c.1890–c.1903	"Gillow & Co"
1903 onwards	"Waring & Gillow" on thin brass plaque

Gillows stamps.

== See also ==
- Leighton Hall, Lancashire

== Bibliography ==
- Apter-Fredericks (2014). "18th Century Memorable Pieces". 265 - 267 Fulham Road, London, SW3 6HY: Apter-Fredericks. Archived from the original on 24 September 2014.
- Boynton, Lindsay (1995). Gillow Furniture Designs: 1760–1800. The Bloomfield Press.
- Dunn, Judith (2008). "Gillows of Lancaster Two Centuries of English Furniture". New England Antiques Journal. Palmer, MA 01069. Archived from the original on 18 February 2012.
- Stuart, Susan E (2008). Gillows of Lancaster and London. Antique Collectors' Club.
- Colvin, Howard (1995), A Biographical Dictionary of British Architects, 1600–1840 (3rd ed.), New Haven and London: Yale University Press, ISBN 978-0-300-12508-5
