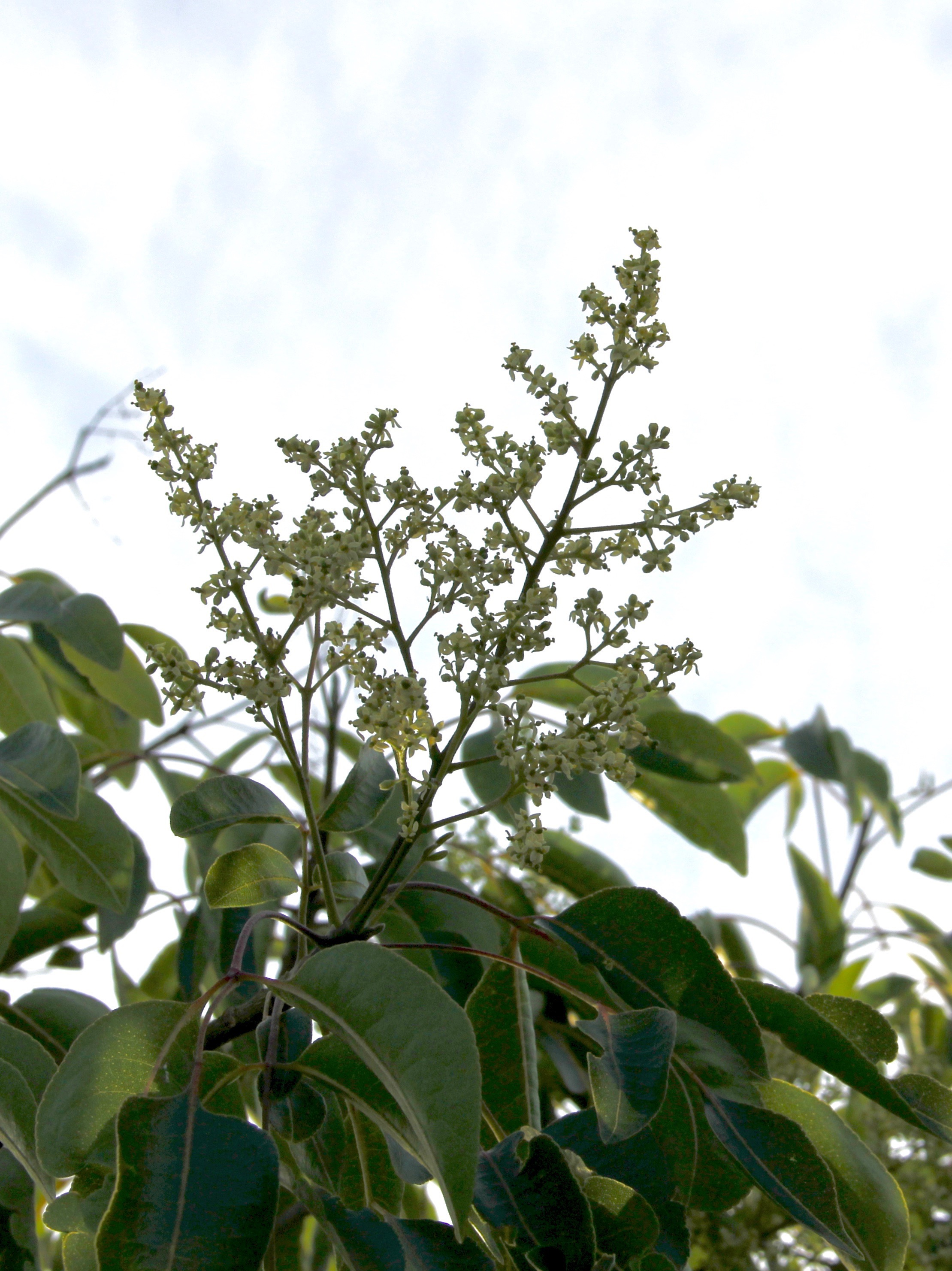

Conservation status
- Vulnerable (IUCN 3.1)

Scientific classification
- Kingdom: Plantae
- Clade: Embryophytes
- Clade: Tracheophytes
- Clade: Spermatophytes
- Clade: Angiosperms
- Clade: Eudicots
- Clade: Rosids
- Order: Sapindales
- Family: Rutaceae
- Genus: Zanthoxylum
- Species: Z. flavum

Binomial name
- Zanthoxylum flavum Vahl

= Zanthoxylum flavum =

Species of tree

Zanthoxylum flavum is a medium-sized tree in the family Rutaceae. Common names include noyer, West Indian satinwood, yellow sanders, tembetaria, and yellow sandalwood. It is native to Anguilla, Antigua and Barbuda, the Bahamas, Bermuda, Cuba, the Dominican Republic, Guadeloupe, Haiti, Jamaica, Puerto Rico, and the Florida Keys, exclusive of Key West where it has been extirpated. It is threatened by habitat loss and harvesting for its dense, durable wood used in fine woodworking.

== Habitat ==
In its native subtropical range Z. flavum grows in areas with average to high rainfall year-round or with defined dry seasons. It grows on a variety of soils with different drainage regimes, from rapidly draining volcanic derived soils to well-draining clay soils. The tree can grow on serpentine soils.

== Description ==
It grows with a straight bole, producing a limited canopy of pinnately compound leaves, clusters of small pale yellow to cream-coloured flowers and small black seeds. The species epithet flavum is Latin for yellow and indicates its flower colour. Pollination is probably from bees, and the seeds are thought to be dispersed by birds and bats, as with the closely related species, Z. martinicense.
