= HM Prison Lancaster =

Former prison in Lancaster, England

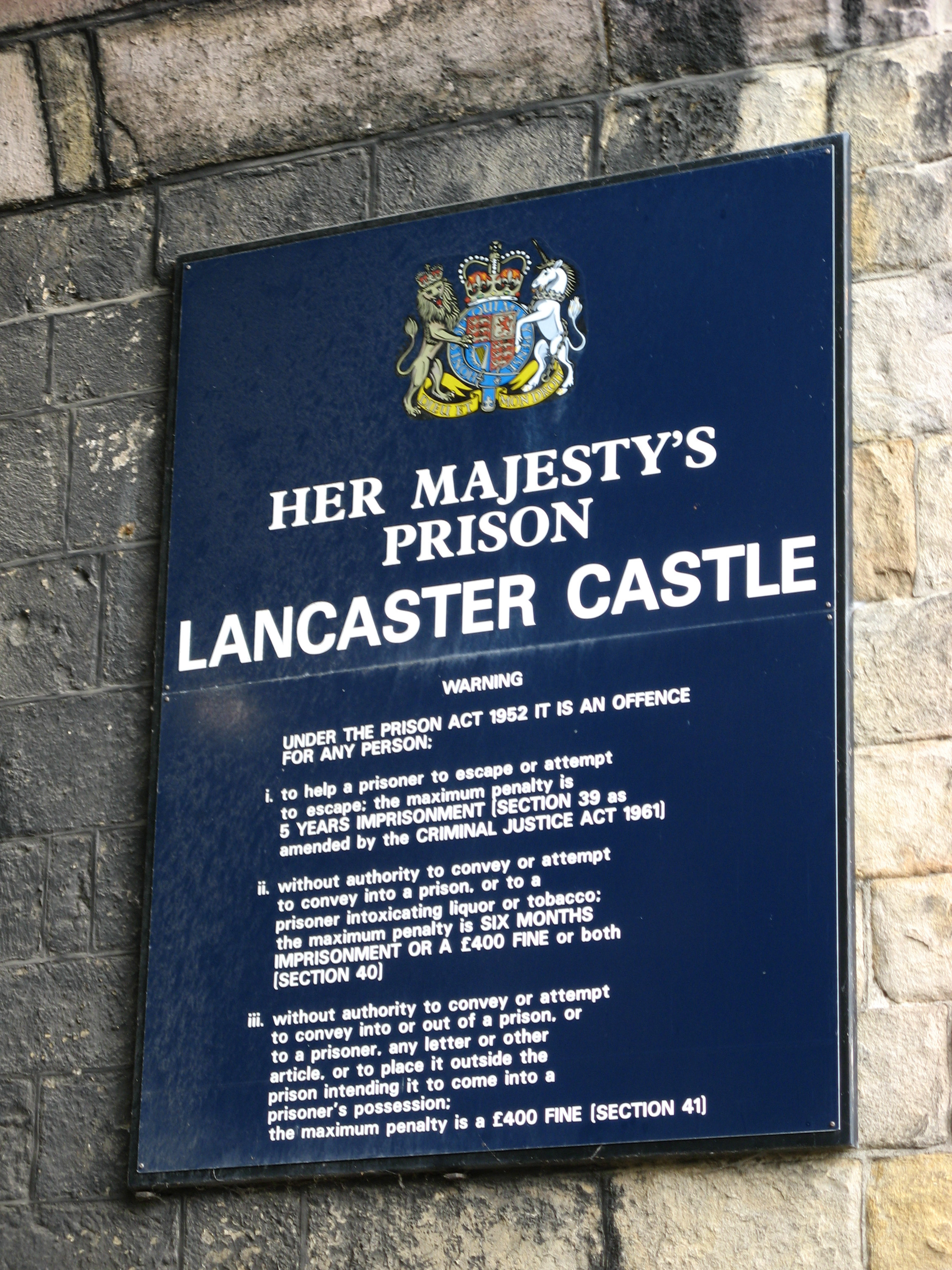
HM Prison Lancaster entrance sign

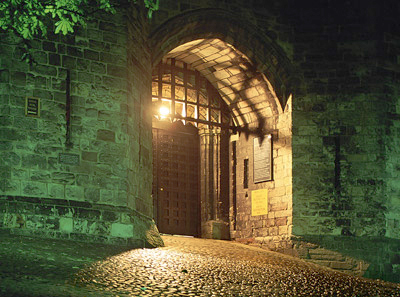
HM Prison Lancaster entrance

HM Prison Lancaster was an English prison located in Lancaster Castle, Lancaster from 1955 to 2011.

HM Prison Lancaster was a small category C male training prison.

Judge Stephen Tumim, in his capacity as Her Majesty's Chief Inspector of Prisons conducted an unannounced short inspection, the report of which was published in 1991.

Terence Bond of the Probation service based at HM Prison Lancaster received the MBE in the 2008 new Year Honours list.

== Closure ==
When closure was announced 30 Members of Parliament signed an Early Day Motion regretting the decision and pointing out that the prison ranked second in national statistics for the resettlement of offenders, which in turn had a significant impact on the crime rate in North East England. Final closure of the prison occurred on 8 February 2012, at which time the associated Independent Monitoring Board was also closed. Closure of the prison was incurred costs of £1.5M, including the costs of the exit programme team and payments to staff affected by the closure. A further £105k were incurred to cover the travel expenses of relocated staff, covering a three-year period. Other decommissioning costs included £56k as regards IT, and £108k as regards education. There was additionally a Lancashire Probation Trust notice payment of £42k.

HMP Lancaster Castle was reopened to become a visitor attraction, where you can now visit the prison.

== See also ==
- HM Prison Lancaster Farms
- Lancaster Castle § Gaol
