= Gillow archives =

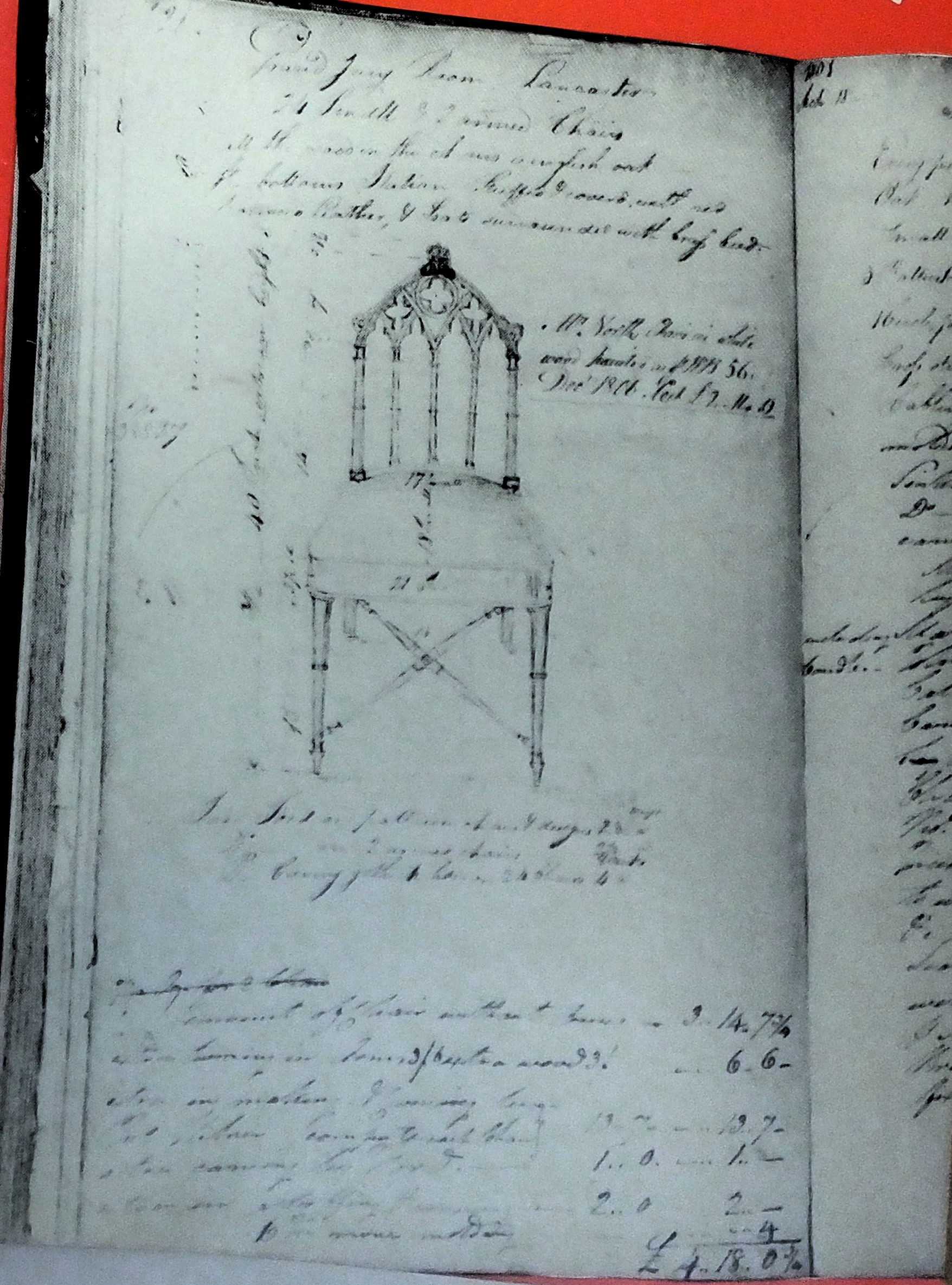
A sample page

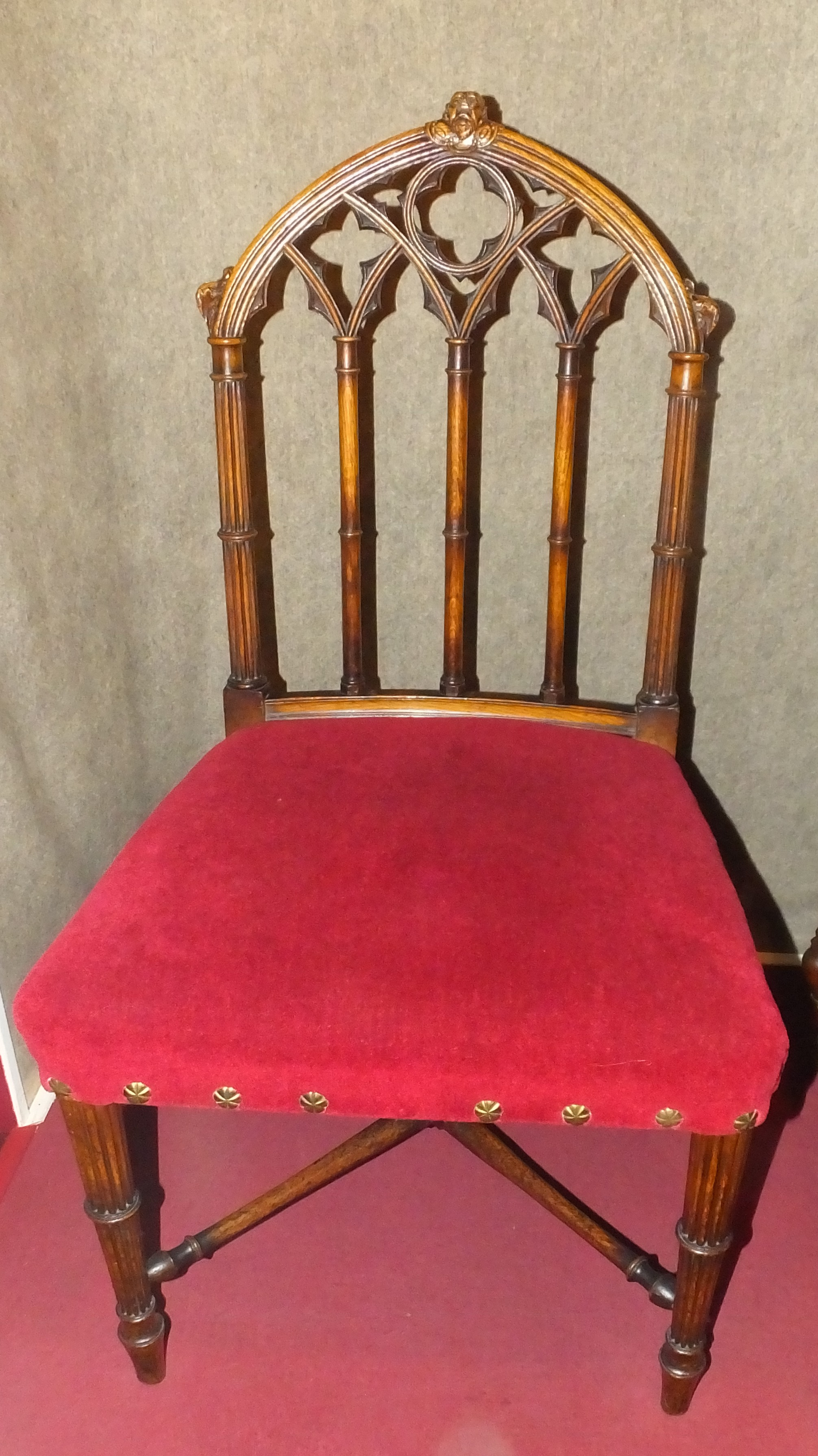
A chair built to the design above

The Gillow archives are the commercial records and design books of Gillows of Lancaster and London; they are one of the largest and longest collection of records of any cabinet-maker to have survived.

They consist of Estimate books, Estimate sketch-books and accounts.

Between 1731 and 1850 about 137 apprentices were bound almost exclusively to the firm in Lancaster.

The record books remained in Lancaster from 1729 to 1961. In 1966 the announcement that the archive was to be sold to a private buyer, and the records were to leave the country caused a storm of protest. PK Thornton, of the Department of furniture at the Victoria and Albert Museum, successfully organised an objection to the export licence. They were then purchased by Westminster City Libraries, and they are divided between the City of Westminster Archives Centre and the Lancashire Archives.
