= Robert Gillow =

English furniture manufacturer (1704–1772)

- Born: 2 August 1704; Singleton, Lancashire, England
- Died: 1772
- Occupation: Furniture maker
- Spouse: Agnes Fell

Robert Gillow (1704–1772) was an English furniture manufacturer, who founded Gillow & Co.

== Early life ==
Robert Gillow was born on 2 August 1704 in Singleton, Lancashire to a prominent English recusant Roman Catholic family. He served an apprenticeship as a cabinet maker.

== Career ==
He joined with a family of traders called Sattersthwaite and sailed with them to the West Indies as a ships carpenter. In Jamaica, he became interested in mahogany and brought samples of the wood back to Lancaster in 1720. This may have been the first mahogany to be imported to England.

He founded the luxury furniture and furnishings firm Gillow of Lancaster in 1730. During the 1730s, he began to exploit the lucrative West Indies trade exporting mahogany furniture and importing rum and sugar, in addition to fitting out ships cabins and doing finishing work in construction. The firm rapidly established a reputation for supplying high quality furniture and furnishings to the richest families in the country. They also had a London workshop in Thames Street.

In 1764, a permanent London branch of Gillow's was established at 176 Oxford Road, now Oxford Street, by Robert's son, Thomas Robert Gillow (1745–1793), and William Taylor. Following Robert's retirement in 1769, the business was continued by his two sons, Richard (1734–1811) and Thomas Robert (his other children were Alice, Edward and John). Richard Gillow was the architect for the Custom House, Lancaster, and he is credited with originating the telescopic dining-table. For over a century, the firm was known for its luxury furniture and furnishings. During the final years of the nineteenth century, the company ran into financial difficulty and from 1897 began a loose financial arrangement with Waring of Liverpool, an arrangement legally ratified by the establishment of Waring & Gillow in 1903.

== Personal life ==
He married Agnes Fell (1708–1757) in 1730 in Lancaster. Fell was the daughter of James and Agnes Fell of Swarthmoor Hall.

== Death ==
He died in 1772.

== See also ==
- Leighton Hall, Lancashire
- Paulyn Gillow
- Richard Gillow
- Joseph Gillow
