= Lancaster Castle =

Castle in Lancaster, Lancashire, England

- Lancaster, Lancashire, England
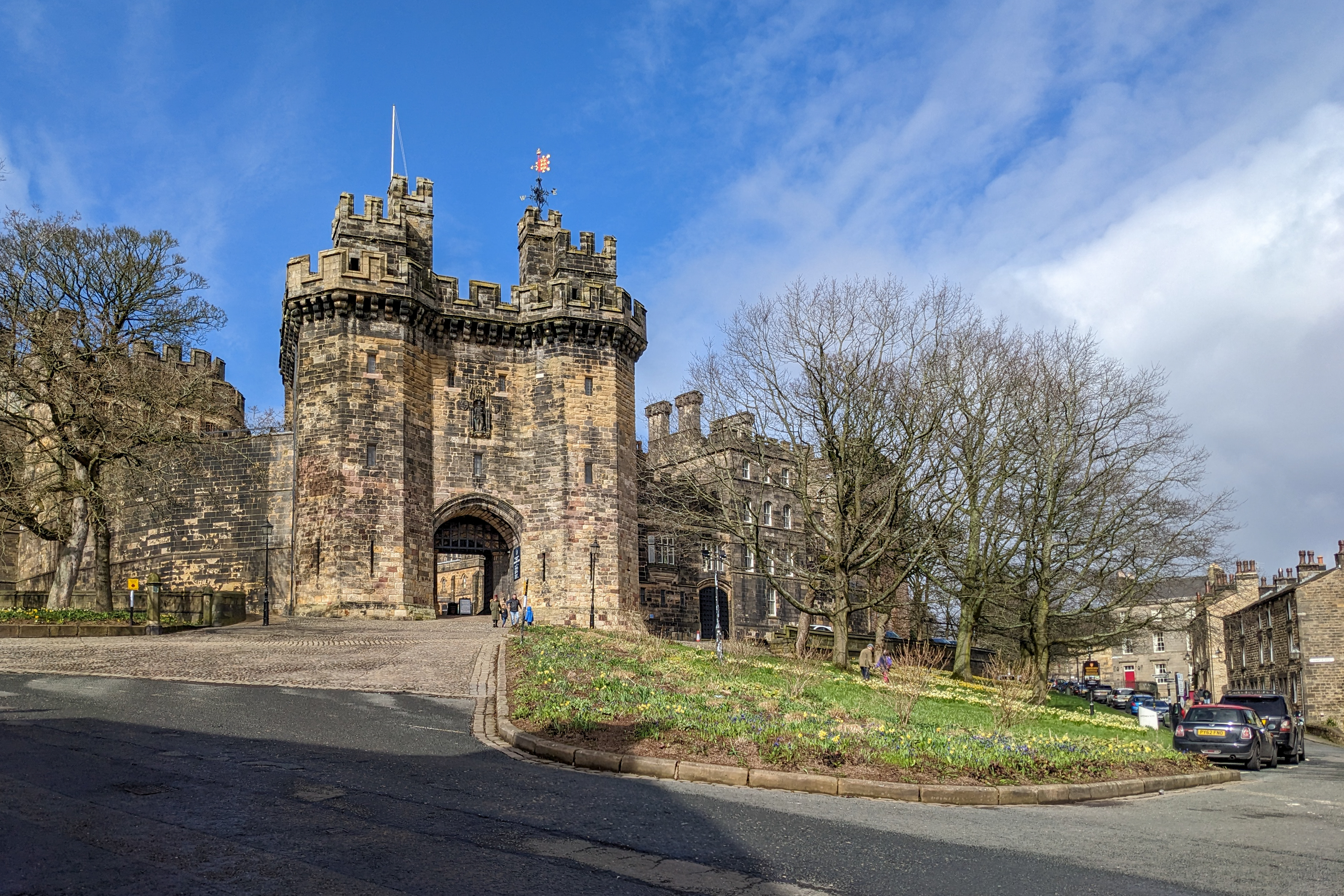
- Lancaster Castle's entrance

Site information
- Type: Castle
- Website: www.lancastercastle.com

Location
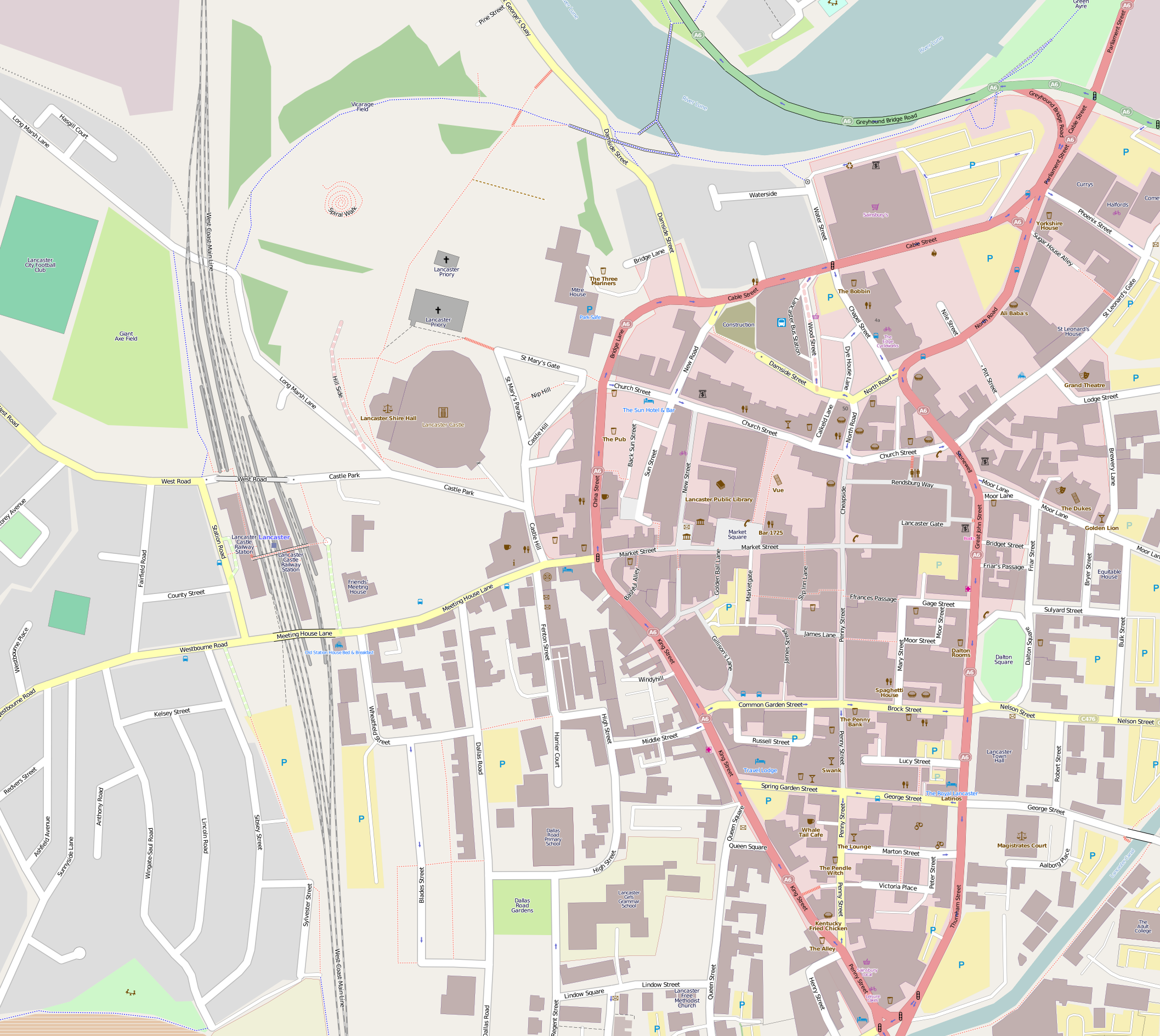
- Location within Lancaster city centre
- Coordinates: 54.04981°N 2.80562°W grid reference SD473619

Lancaster Castle is a medieval castle and former prison in Lancaster in the English county of Lancashire. Its early history is unclear, but it was most likely founded in 1092-4 on the site of a Roman fort overlooking a crossing of the River Lune. In 1164 the Honour of Lancaster, including the castle, came under royal control. In 1322 and 1389 the Scots invaded England, progressing as far as Lancaster and damaging the castle. It was not to see military action again until the English Civil War. The castle was first used as a prison in 1196 although this aspect became more important during the English Civil War. The castle buildings are owned by the British sovereign as Duke of Lancaster; part of the structure is used to host sittings of the Crown Court.

Until 2011 the majority of the buildings were leased to the Ministry of Justice as HM Prison Lancaster, after which the castle was returned to the Duchy's management. The castle is now open to the public seven days a week and is undergoing a large-scale refurbishment. There is a large sweeping public piazza, allowing access to the cloistered area, renovated in 2019. A new section of the café has been built, against the old outer curtain wall, which was reduced in height to afford views of the neighbouring Lancaster Priory. This is the first 21st-century addition to the castle. Another renovated building adjoining the café is leased to Lancaster University as a campus in the city with small conference facilities.

== Background ==
Between 60 and 73 AD, a Roman fort was built at Lancaster on a hill commanding a crossing over the River Lune. Little is known about Lancaster between the end of the Roman occupation of England in the early 5th century and the Norman Conquest in the late 11th century. The layout of the town was influenced by the Roman fort and the associated civilian settlement; the main road through the town was the route that led east from the fort. After the Norman conquest of England in the second half of the 11th century, Lancaster was part of the Earldom of Northumbria; it was claimed by the kings of England and Scotland. In 1092, William II established a permanent border with Scotland further to the north by capturing Carlisle. It is generally thought that Lancaster Castle was founded in the 1090s on the site of the Roman fort in a strategic location. The castle is the oldest standing building in Lancaster and one of the most important. The history of the structure is uncertain. This is partly due to its former use as a prison, which has prevented extensive archaeological investigation.

== History ==
=== Foundation ===
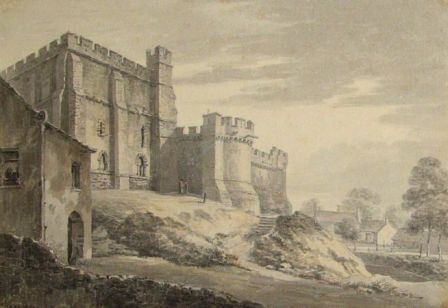
A watercolour by Thomas Hearne from 1778 of the west of Lancaster's keep. The round tower next to the keep was demolished in 1796.

As there are no contemporary documents recording the foundation of the castle, it is not certain when and by whom it was started. There are two candidates, firstly, and in light of architectural evidence the far more likely, is Roger de Poitou, the Norman lord in control of the Honour of Lancaster. Secondly there is King David I of Scotland during his occupation of Lancaster during the anarchy.

The architectural evidence for Roger de Poitou is the two romanesque windows in the lower part of the northern elevation of the keep. These windows have been stylistically compared to those at the Exchequer Hall at Caen, now thought to have been constructed circa 1090. The Exchequer Hall at Caen is thought to have been built under the auspices of King William II of England by masons of a “southern Norman origin”. Roger de Poitou was of the Montgomerie family, being a son of Roger de Montgomery, Earl of Shrewsbury. His mother was Mabel de Bellême, therefore his paternal and maternal origins in Normandy lay in the south of the duchy. In 1092 King William II of England is known to have pushed the north western border of England northward to Carlisle and built a castle there. In 1094 Roger de Poitou founded Lancaster Priory. The accumulation of this evidence strongly points to the keep at Lancaster being begun in the period 1092-4 by masons known to both Roger de Poitou and William II of England by masons recruited in the south of Normandy.

Roger de Poitou fled England in 1102 after participating in a failed family rebellion in support of Robert Curthose against the new king, Henry I. As a result, the king confiscated the Honour of Lancaster, which included the castle. The Honour changed hands several times. Henry granted it to Stephen of Blois, his nephew and later king. When the Anarchy erupted in 1139 – a civil war between Stephen and Empress Matilda for the English throne – the area was in turmoil. Stephen secured his northern frontier by allowing David I of Scotland to occupy the Honour in 1141. It is possible that David refortified the castle at this time. Due to a lack of investigation, there is little evidence to suggest additions to Lancaster in the mid-12th century. However, the uncertain construction date of the keep means that the King of Scotland could have been responsible for building it. The war came to an end in 1153. It was agreed that after Stephen died, he would be succeeded by Henry Plantagenet (later King Henry II), Matilda's son. Part of the agreement was that the King of Scotland would relinquish the Honour of Lancaster, which would be held by William, Stephen's son. After William's death in 1164, the Honour of Lancaster again came under royal control when Henry II gained possession of the Honour.

On the death of Henry II, the Honour passed to his son, Richard the Lionheart, who gave it to his brother, Prince John, in the hope of securing his loyalty. One of the functions castles served was as a prison; the first record of the castle being used in this way was in 1196, although the role became much more important after the English Civil War. Since the 12th century, the monarch appointed a sheriff to maintain the peace in Lancashire, a role usually filled by the duke and based at the castle. In the late 12th and early 13th century, many timber castles founded during the Norman Conquest were rebuilt in stone. Lancaster was one such castle. Building in stone was expensive and time-consuming. For example, the late 12th-century stone keep at Peveril Castle in Derbyshire cost around £200, although something on a much larger scale, such as the vast Château Gaillard cost an estimated £15,000 to £20,000 and took several years to complete. For many castles, the expenditure is unknown. However, work on royal castles was often documented in Pipe Rolls, which began in 1155. The Rolls show that John spent over £630 on digging a ditch outside Lancaster's south and west walls, and for the construction of "the King's lodgings". This probably referred to what is now known as Adrian's Tower. His successor, Henry III also spent large sums on Lancaster: £200 in 1243 and £250 in 1254 for work on the gatehouse and creating a stone curtain wall.

=== 14th and 15th centuries ===
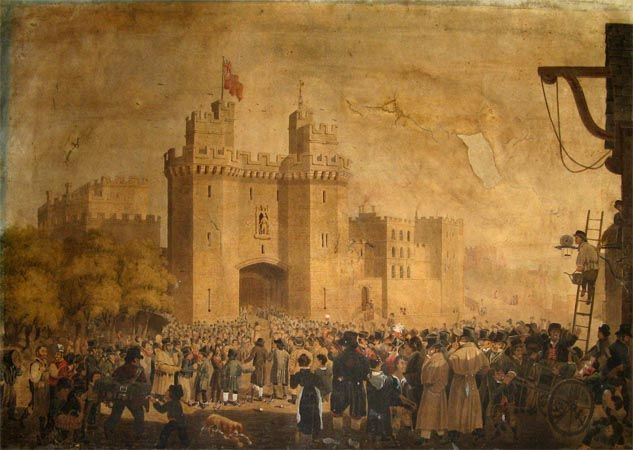
The castle's 15th-century gatehouse, in a 19th-century depiction by an unknown artist, with new inmates arriving at the castle when it was used as a prison.

For the next 150 years, there is no record of building work, although accounts are incomplete. The Well Tower is thought to date from the early 14th century. If there was no work on the castle, this may indicate that it was not important enough to warrant expenditure beyond upkeep, as Lancaster was not near a border. Though the region was generally peaceful, the Scots invaded in 1322 and 1389, reaching Lancaster and damaging the castle. The holdings of the Duchy of Lancaster extended beyond the county, and Lancaster was not especially important. However, when Henry Duke of Lancaster ascended the throne as King Henry IV in 1399, he almost immediately began adding the monumental gatehouse. A further devastation of the town, as had been inflicted in 1389, would have been an embarrassment for the new king; his expensive programme of building at the castle helped protect against this. The gatehouse Henry replaced was probably a simple structure, no more than a passage between two towers, but the rebuilt structure rivalled the keep as the strongest part of the castle. Records show that between 1402 and 1422, the year Henry V died, over £2,500 was spent on building work. While most of this sum would have been spent on the gatehouse, some may have been used to make alterations to the top storey of the keep. Since then, the castle has remained in the ownership of the Crown.

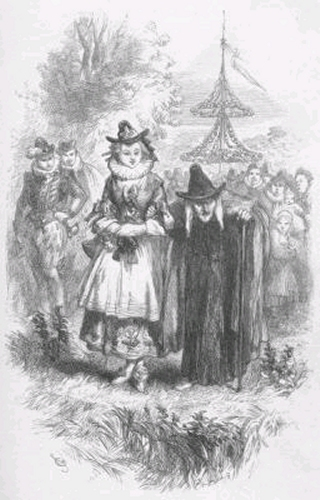
Two of the Pendle witches, tried at Lancaster in 1612, in an illustration from William Harrison Ainsworth's 1849 novel The Lancashire Witches

After the Scottish invasion of 1389, Lancaster saw no further military action until the English Civil War. A survey in 1578 led to repairs to the keep costing £235. With the threat of a Spanish invasion, the castle was strengthened in 1585. After Elizabeth I was excommunicated in 1570, she retaliated by declaring Roman Catholic priests guilty of high treason. Any discovered in Lancashire were taken to Lancaster Castle for trial. During the period 1584-1646 fifteen Catholics were executed in Lancaster for their faith. The notorious Pendle witches trial took place at Lancaster Castle in 1612.

=== Civil War ===
At the outbreak of the Civil War Lancaster was lightly garrisoned. A small Parliamentarian force captured the castle in February 1643, established a garrison and set about building earthworks around the approaches to the town. In response, the Royalists dispatched an army to retake Lancaster. The outer defences fell in March; a siege of the castle lasted just two days as Parliamentarian reinforcements were heading to Lancaster from Preston. The Royalists unsuccessfully tried to recapture Lancaster in April and again in June; the town and castle remained under Parliament's control until the end of the war. Orders were given that "all the walls about [Lancaster Castle] should be thrown down". The instruction was not followed, and in August 1648 the town withstood a siege from the Royalist Duke of Hamilton who led an army south from Scotland. King Charles was executed in January 1649 and shortly after Parliament again ordered the slighting of the castle, apart from buildings necessary for administration and use as a county gaol. The monarchy was restored in 1660, and Charles II visited Lancaster on 12 August and released all the prisoners held in the castle. Lancashire's High Sheriff and Justices of the Peace petitioned the king to repair the castle. The buildings were surveyed and repair work estimated at £1,957. After the slighting of the castle, including the demolition of the Well Tower, it was militarily redundant.

=== Gaol ===
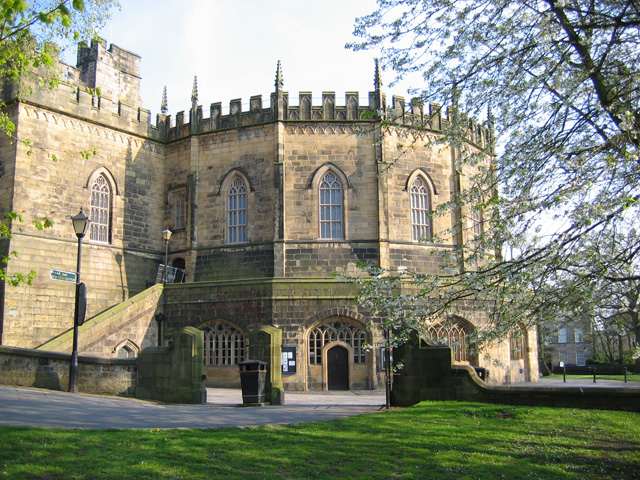
The Shire Hall

In 1554, the martyr George Marsh was held at the castle before standing trial at Chester Cathedral. Some Quakers, including in 1660 George Fox, were held at the castle for being politically dangerous. County gaols, such as this one, were intended to hold prisoners for short periods immediately before trial. The castle also served as a debtors' prison. In the 18th century it became more common for county gaols to hold longer-term prisoners; as a result they began to suffer from overcrowding.

Prison reformer John Howard (1726–1790) visited Lancaster in 1776 and noted the conditions in the prison. His efforts to instigate reform led to prisoners in gaols throughout the country being separated by gender and category of their crime. Improvements were also made to sanitation; in the 18th century more people died from gaol fever than by hanging. In the last two decades of the century, around £30,000 was spent rebuilding Lancaster's county gaol. Architect Thomas Harrison was commissioned to complete the work. Under his auspices, the Gaoler's House was built in 1788 in a Gothic style. Separate prisons were built for men and women. The Shire Hall and Crown Court were complete by 1798. Harrison had to divide his time between Lancaster and designing and building Chester Castle's Shire Hall and Courts; work at Lancaster slowed, partly because of dwindling funds due to war with France, and Harrison was released from the work as the Justices of the Peace felt it was taking too long. The artist Robert Freebairn was paid £500 to paint twelve watercolours of the work in 1800 to be presented to the Duke of Lancaster, King George III. In 1802 the castle received more funding and Joseph Gandy was commissioned to complete the interiors of the Shire Hall and Crown Court.

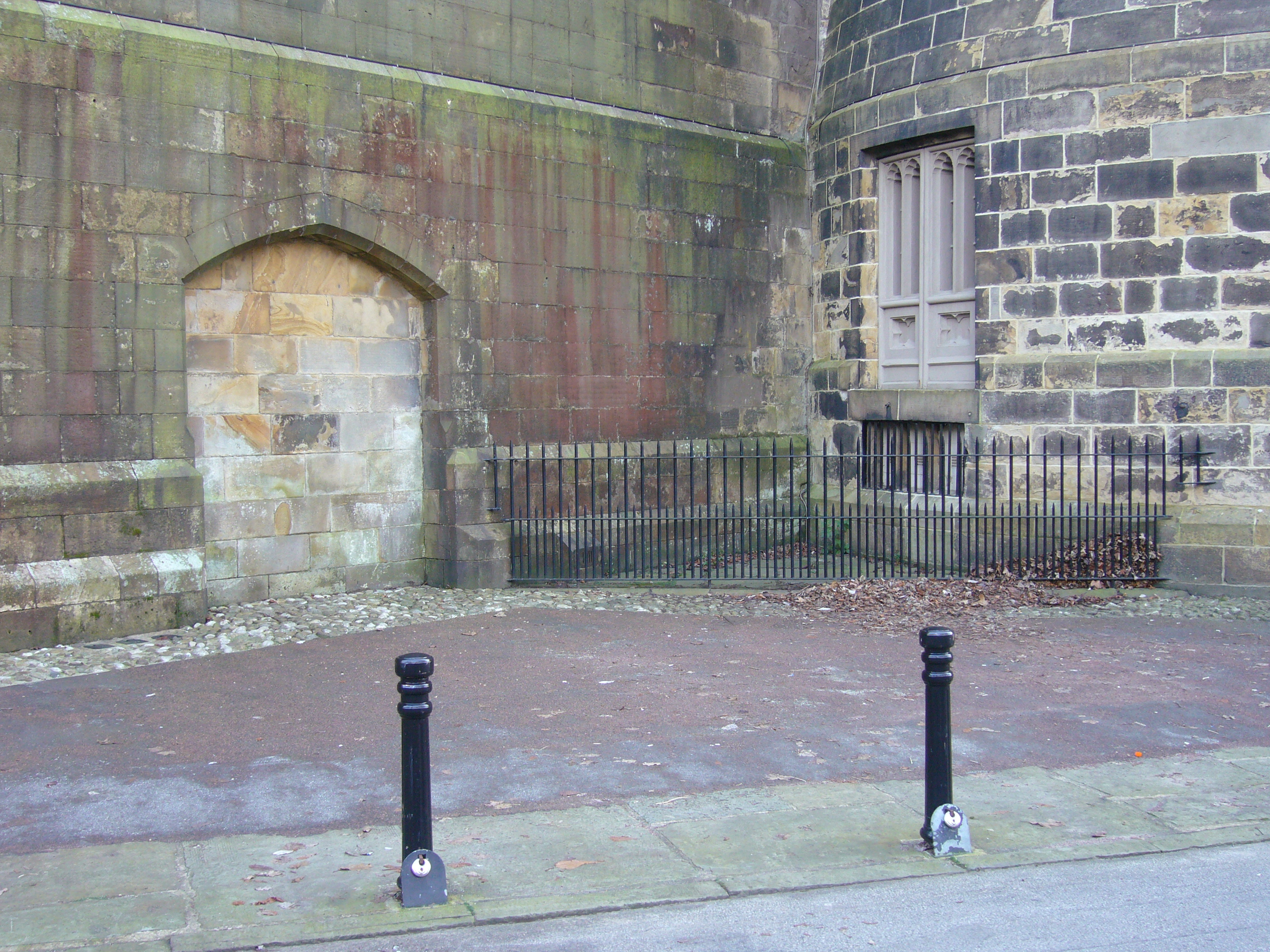
"Hanging Corner" – the site of public executions until 1865. The double doors on the right led to the gallows situated in front of the sealed archway.

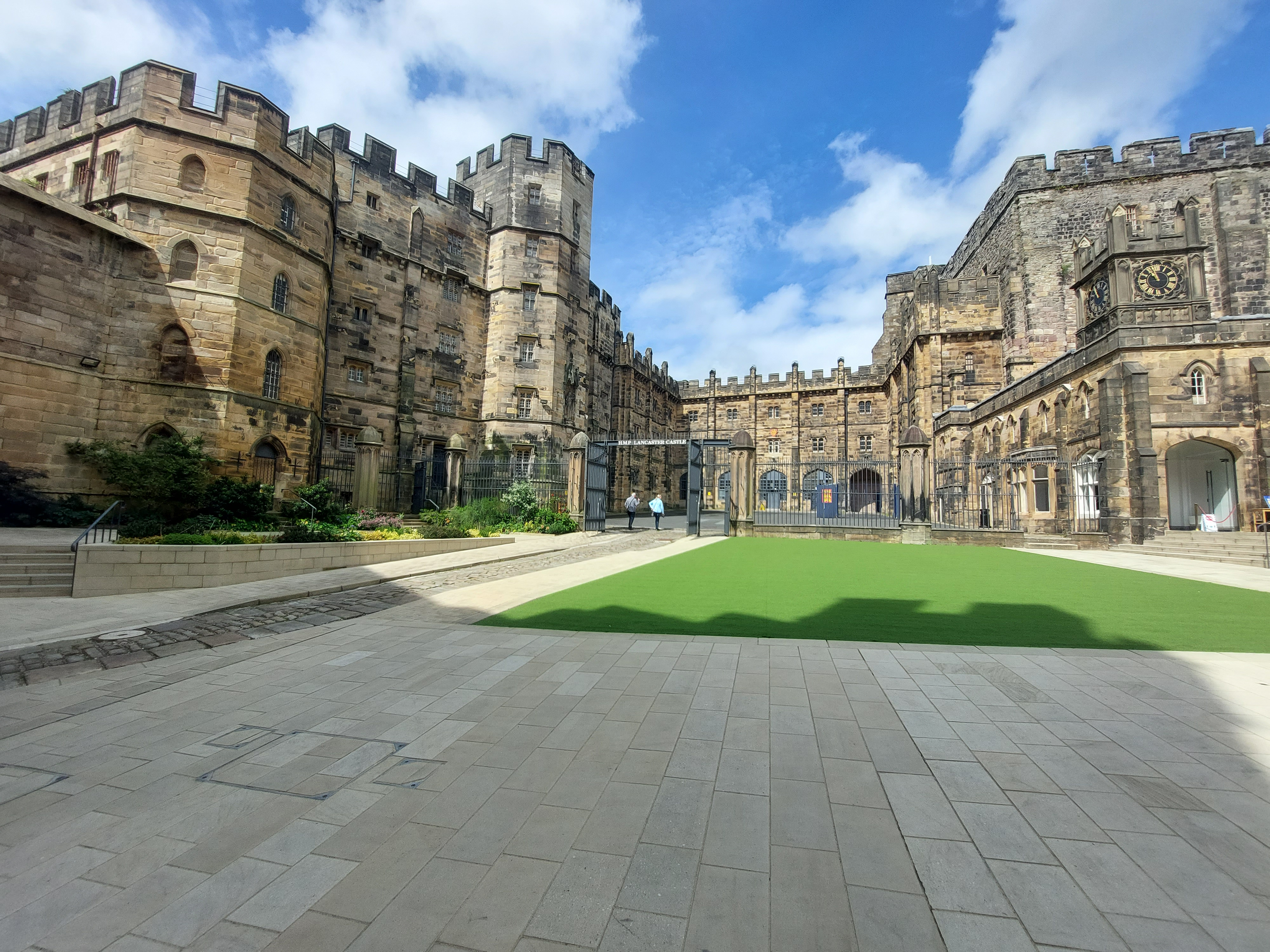
The courtyard of Lancaster Castle (2021)

Those sentenced to death before c. 1800 at the castle were usually taken to Lancaster Moor, near where the Ashton Memorial now stands, to be hanged. After the Georgian remodelling of the castle, it was decided it would be more convenient to perform executions nearer the castle. The spot chosen became known as Hanging Corner. Lancaster has a reputation as the court that sentenced more people to death than any other in England. This is partly because until 1835 Lancaster Castle was the only Assize Court in the entire county and covered rapidly growing industrial centres including Manchester and Liverpool. Between 1782 and 1865, around 265 people were hanged at Lancaster; the executions were frequently attended by thousands of people crowded into the churchyard. The Capital Punishment Amendment Act 1868 ended public executions, requiring that criminals be put to death in private, after which 6 executions were performed inside the castle, at first from the Chapel steps, then later in a purpose-built execution shed, on the inside wall of Hanging Corner. This shed remained until the mid-20th Century, allegedly still containing the Gallows. The last execution (of Thomas Rawcliffe, murderer) at Lancaster took place in 1910. The prison closed in 1916 due to a national decrease in the number of prisoners, although for part of the First World War it held German civilians and military prisoners of war.

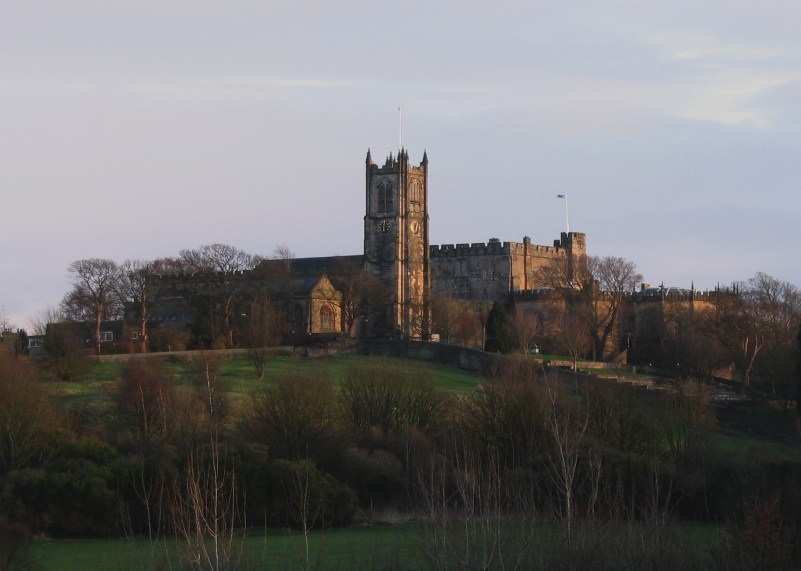
The rear of the castle and the adjacent Priory

Between 1931 and 1937 the castle was used by the county council to train police officers. Lancaster was once again designated for use as a prison from 1954 onwards when the council leased the castle to the Home Office. The last Assizes were held at Lancaster in 1972. As the court and prison were so close, and contained within the castle walls, Lancaster was used for high-security trials.

The castle formally opened as HM Prison Lancaster in 1955, becoming a Category C prison for male inmates, and a venue for the Crown Court. In July 2010 the Ministry of Justice announced it was intending to close it, stating it was outdated and costly. The prison closure was confirmed for March 2011.

== Current status ==
The Crown Court continues to sit at the castle. Closure of the prison will eventually allow the castle to be opened to visitors and tourists as a permanent attraction. The Lancashire Police Museum, housed within A Wing of the former prison, opened in June 2022.

To commemorate the 400th anniversary of the trials of the Pendle witches, a new long-distance walking route called the Lancashire Witches Walk has been created. Ten tercet waymarkers, designed by Stephen Raw, each inscribed with a verse of a poem by Carol Ann Duffy have been installed along the route, with the tenth located here, to mark the end-point.

=== Refurbishment ===
A large-scale refurbishment of the castle has been underway since 2011. In 2016 Historic England commissioned a tree-ring analysis of oak and pine timbers in the Keep and Gatehouse. The oak timbers in the Keep's undercroft were shown to have been felled in the 1380s, whilst those from the Great Hall were probably felled slightly later, towards the end of the fourteenth century or very early-fifteenth century. The oak timbers in the Gatehouse were probably felled in, or around, AD 1404.

The latest phase, started in September 2017 and completed in November 2019, has opened up the former prison kitchen yard. This phase created a new teaching centre, as well as more than 5,000 sq ft of space, in which the Duchy has leased a section of the old kitchen to local coffee roasters and tea merchants, J. Atkinson & Co. (established 1837) to run a café.

== Layout ==
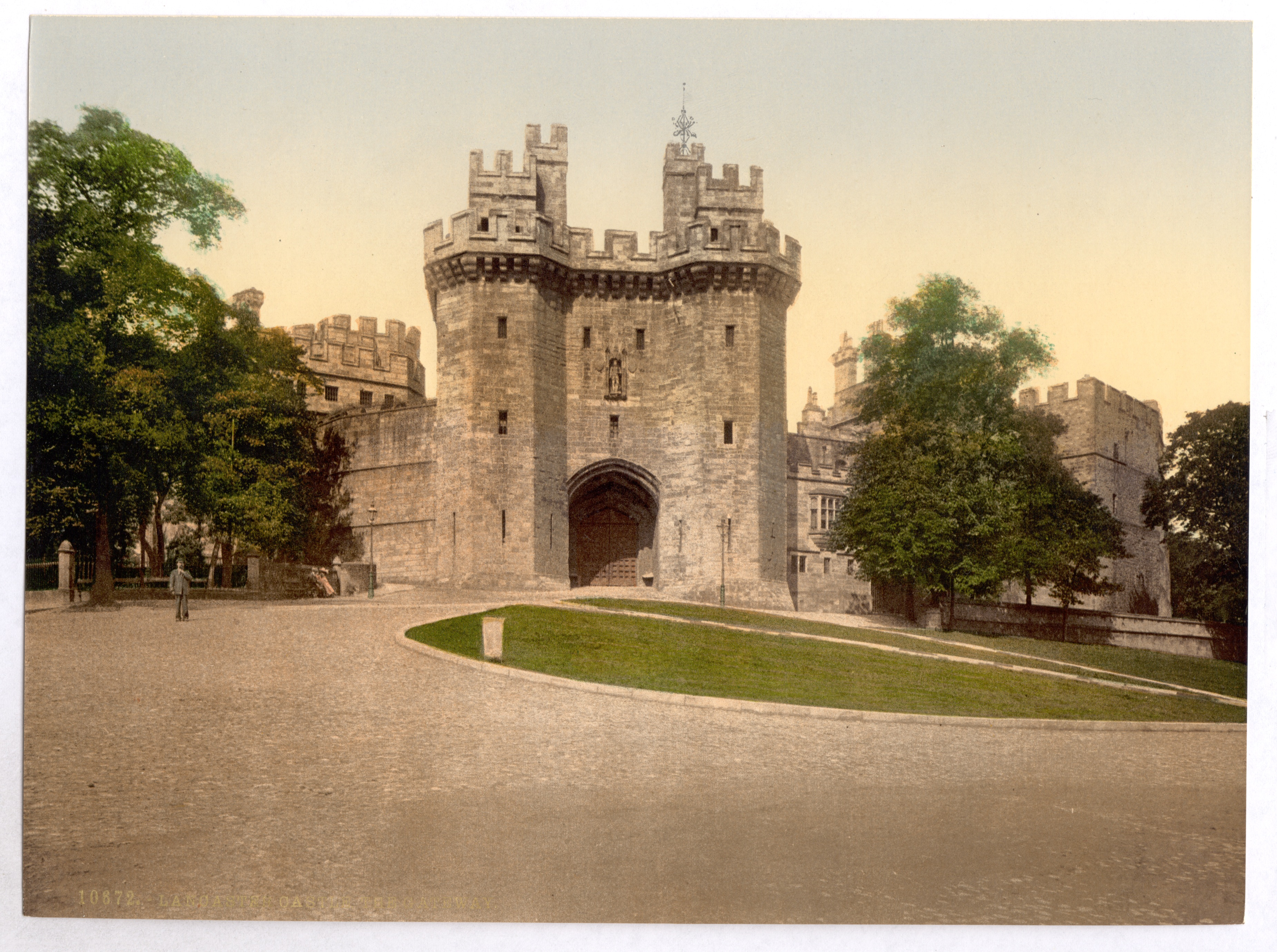
Lancaster's gatehouse in 1905. The castle was used as a prison until March 2011.

The keep is the oldest part of the castle. It is uncertain when the keep was built, although it probably dates to the 12th century when it was the residence for the lord of the castle—the owner or his representative. In the event of an assault, the keep formed the last line of defence. It is 20 metres (66 feet) high with four storeys; each floor divided into two rooms. The outer wall is 3 metres (9.8 ft) thick; along the exterior are buttresses at each corner and in the middle of each wall. Like most Norman keeps, Lancaster's would have been entered at first floor level. Construction in stone would have been a costly and time-consuming exercise, taking around five years and costing about £1,000. The medieval hall stood south-west of the keep and was dismantled in 1796 during the remodelling of the castle. The late-18th- to early-19th-century Shire Hall next to the keep is a large ten-side room.

In the south-west corner of the castle is a cylindrical tower named Adrian's Tower from the popular legend that it was built by the Roman Emperor Hadrian. The tower was, however, built in the early 13th century, probably during the reign of King John. Although the exterior was refaced in the 18th century, medieval stonework is visible in the interior.

The main entrance is through a 20-metre-high (66 ft) gatehouse built at the start of the 15th century. It was instigated by King Henry IV, although legend attributes the work to John of Gaunt, Duke of Lancaster from 1362 to his death in 1399. Two semi-octagonal towers flank a passageway protected by a portcullis. Battlements project over the gatehouse, and would have allowed defenders to rain missiles on attackers immediately below. Above the gate is a niche which would originally have contained a statue of a saint, flanked by a coat of arms of the kings of England. Because of the legend, a statue of John of Gaunt was placed in the empty niche in the 19th century. Three storeys high, the apartment on the ground floor would probably have been used by the Constable of the castle; the two floors above had three rooms each. After the English Civil War, most of the gatehouse rooms were filled with debtors. The sophistication of the gatehouse prompted John Champness, who wrote Lancaster Castle: A Brief History, to remark "it is perhaps the finest of its date and type in England".

During the Roman era in the 4th century, the fort was surrounded by the "Wery Wall" which is believed to translate as the 'green wall'. The wall, described as being a 3-metre-thick (9.8 ft) 'indestructible mass' with a defensive ditch, now only remains visible on the east slope of Castle Hill. In his book The Historic Lands of England, Sir Bernard Burke suggests the wall may have been visible in more places 100 years prior to his writing in 1849. However, it is unclear where the wall would have been. The remaining Wery Wall measures 4m × 3m × 3m and consists of only rubble due to the facing stones having been reused elsewhere.

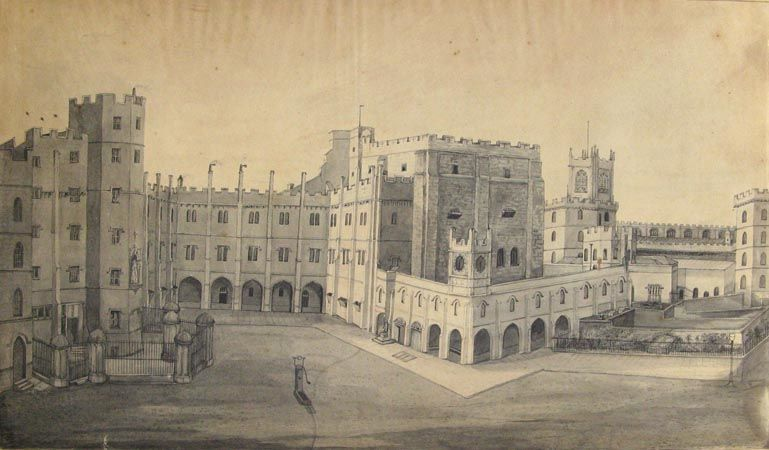
An interior view of Lancaster Castle in 1824, pen and ink drawing by J. Weetman. The keep is right of centre.

== In Art and Literature ==
Letitia Elizabeth Landon's poetical illustration Lancaster Castle., to a picture by Thomas Allom showing the Shire Hall and the Priory, was published in Fisher's Drawing Room Scrap Book, 1837.

== List of constables ==
- 1225: Ranulph de Blundeville
- 1268: Roger de Lancaster
- 1285: Edmund Crouchback 1st Earl of Lancaster (died 1296)
- ?1296: Thomas, 2nd Earl of Lancaster (executed 1322)
- 1326: Henry, 3rd Earl of Lancaster (died 1345)
- 1345: Henry of Grosmont
- c.1394: Thomas Radcliffe
- c.1401: William Rygmayden
- 1600: Richard Warburton
- 1803: Alexander Butler of Kirkland
- 1811: Sir Richard Clayton, 1st Baronet
- 1840: William Hulton
- 1860: Edmund George Hornby
- 1865: Thomas Greene
- 1872: Thomas Batty Addison
- 1874: Robert Townley Parker
- 1879: John Wilson-Patten, 1st Baron Winmarleigh
- 1892: Sir William Hulton, 1st Baronet
- 1907: John Tomlinson Hibbert
- 1908: Edward Bousfield Dawson
- 1916: Sir William Scott Barrett
- 1920: James Williamson, 1st Baron Ashton
- 1930: Sir James Travis-Clegg
- 1942: Hugh Molyneux, 7th Earl of Sefton
- 1972: John Stanley, 18th Earl of Derby
- 1995: Michael J. Fitzherbert-Brockholes
- 1998: Eric Jones
- 2004: Gordon Johnson
- 2014: Pamela G. Barker

== See also ==
- Grade I listed buildings in Lancashire
- Listed buildings in Lancaster, Lancashire
- Castles in Great Britain and Ireland
- List of castles in England
- List of works by Thomas Harrison
