= Landport Drapery Bazaar =

Former department store in Portsmouth

Coordinates: 50.7999°N 1.0899°W

Landport Drapery Bazaar was a department store located on Commercial Road, Portsmouth.

== History ==
In 1870 Robert E Davies, the three time Mayor of Portsmouth opened a department store on what is now called Commercial Road (previously Union Road and Landport Road). He called his new enterprise the Landport Drapery Bazaar after the district that the store was located in. The store was also known to locals as the "LDB".

The original store was destroyed by fire in 1908, and subsequently rebuilt. However, in 1941 the store received a direct hit from a German Bomber which left a giant crater in the middle of the store.

The business however returned as part of the Portsmouth rebuilding programme, with a new store within the re-constructed Town centre during the 1950s. But in 1965 the store was purchased by the United Drapery Stores and subsequently in 1982 the store was converted to an Allders.

The Allders store was sold in 2005 to Debenhams. The Debenhams store was permanently closed in March 2020 after Debenhams was liquidated.
