= Allders =

British department store

Coordinates: 51.3744°N 0.1003°W

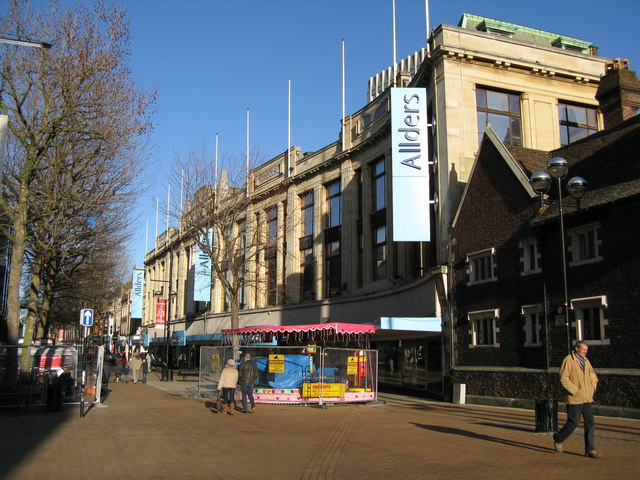
- Allders Croydon, in 2010
- Industry: Retail
- Genre: Department store
- Founded: 1862
- Headquarters: Croydon, Greater London, England
- Parent: Jaeger (2012-2017) Hanson Trust (1983-1993) United Drapery Stores (1958-1983)

Allders was an independent department store operating in the United Kingdom.

The original store was established in 1862 in Croydon by Joshua Allder. In the second half of the 20th century, this parent store was developed into a chain of department stores across England and Wales. By the turn of the millennium, the flagship store in Croydon was the third-largest department store in the United Kingdom. The chain was broken up and sold after it went into administration in 2005, although the Croydon store continued trading until 2012, having been purchased by Harold Tillman, the then-owner of the Jaeger clothing company. On 17 January 2013, the company closed the store along with the website, and the brand ceased to exist. In 2018 the brand relaunched with a department store in the former Co-op Department Store in the Paisley Centre in Paisley, Renfrewshire, but this closed in 2021.

== Joshua Allder ==
Allders was opened in 1862 at 102 and 103 North End, Croydon, as a "linen draper and silk mercer" by Joshua Allder (1838–1904) from Walworth, who had served his apprenticeship in Croydon. His shop was diverse, with special offers on silk dresses and also a morning dress section, and departments offering lower-cost items such as buttons and ribbons. This diversity showed a shrewdness in business and an understanding of his mostly female customers.

Croydon was a growing town, and Allder's business grew with it. In 1870, the shop expanded into 104, 106 and 107 North End, although he had to wait for some 20 years to acquire 105, a bakery. The wealth Allder made allowed him to play a prominent part in the local community, on the Local Board of Health, on the council of the County Borough of Croydon for nine years, and in the non-conformist church community. He supported greater rights for his workers, being instrumental in getting local stores closed for a half-day on Wednesdays. Allder died in 1904 leaving a store which had expanded beyond clothing and haberdashery to sell glass and porcelain, among other items.

His main residence in Pampisford Road, South Croydon, now houses Regina Coeli RC school, and two cul-de-sacs nearby are named Allder Way and Joshua Close.

== Growth ==
In 1908 Allder's family sold the business to J. W. Holdron and F. C. Bearman, owners of stores in Balham and Leytonstone respectively. They developed the store into 50 departments with 500 staff and owned the business until 1921. It then passed to the Lawrence family, under whose control it became a limited company.

In 1926, the famous North End facade was erected, uniting the frontage of the Croydon premises for the first time. In 1932 an Arcade from North End to George Street was completed, proving a very popular addition to the store. An extension to the restaurant was opened in the same year.

The building suffered considerable damage in World War II but never closed. Improvements during the 1950s included the takeover of a cinema auditorium as the gift department and the installation of Croydon's first escalators, built by J & E Hall, in 1954. By 1958, the Lawrence family was forced to sell as a result of death duties incurred after the death of Daniel Arthur Lawrence, managing director. The store was acquired by Jack & Bernard Lyons' United Drapery Stores (UDS), owners of Richard Shops, John Collier, Alexandre Tailors and several department stores. The son of D. A. Lawrence, S. John Lawrence, was kept on by UDS as managing director. Allders continued to expand, reaching £1 million turnover in 1958 and £3 million by 1963. Fashion's importance declined, with household items taking a greater role.

In the 1960s there was considerable change in Croydon, particularly the construction of the Whitgift Centre to the north of Allders, into which the store expanded, and the creation of the St George's Walk development. Transport and lifestyle changes led to greater competition with the West End and further improvements were required to modernise the store. The section fronting George Street was rebuilt and expanded, retaining a Victorian facade, alongside a new addition. Rebuilding works continued into Dingwall Avenue and by 1976 Allders had 1,700 staff and 500,000 square feet (46,000 m^{2}) of floor space. It was a Croydon landmark and became the third-largest department store in the UK, after Harrods and Selfridges. It had the largest carpet department in Europe, amongst other claims. Croydon was by this time a major retail centre.

Allders' immediate competitor, Kennards, was renamed Debenhams in 1973, along with many other Debenhams stores. To compete with the central buying and advertising of Debenhams and other large groups, the department stores owned by UDS were brought together in a new subsidiary company, Allders Department Stores Limited, in 1978. The stores were gradually renamed Allders. This process began with Shinners of Sutton in 1979 and later Hinds of Eltham, Medhursts of Bromley, James Page of Camberley, Mackross of Cardiff, Willis Ludlow of Hull and Landport Drapery Bazaar (LDB) in Portsmouth. Only Arding & Hobbs at Clapham Junction in London, John Farnon in Newcastle upon Tyne and the Clover furnishing stores in Leeds city centre and Kirkstall retained their original identities. A new geometric logo of ten orange 'A's arranged in a circle on brown and cream-coloured stationery, bags and carpets appeared across the group, together with the phrase "All that a great store should be".

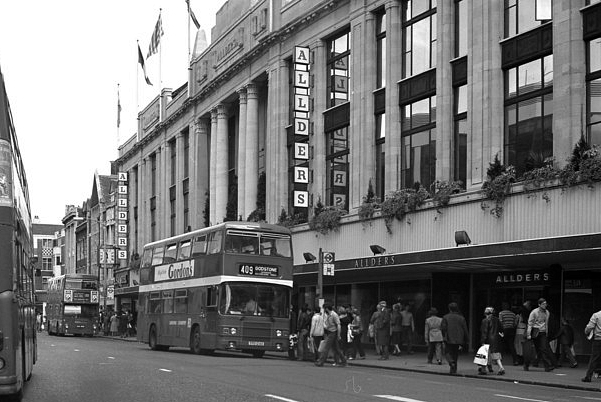
Allders in 1983

In 1983 the Lyons family sold the UDS Group to Hanson plc and Allders became a flagship company of the group, with Lord Hanson appearing on Allders' roof in TV adverts. Allders expanded with new stores opening in Basildon and Chatham and in many international airports as duty-free concessions. A new 'Fourth Floor' was built on the roof of the Croydon store to house a new Audio and Television Department and two new restaurants as well as a link into the staff areas of London House on Dingwall Avenue. The group's brown, cream and orange livery was replaced with a scheme of light blue and gold lettering on a dark blue background.

In 1989 a management buyout saw the international arm spun off as a separate company. There was continued upheaval in Croydon with the complete refurbishment of the Whitgift Centre and of parts of the store. The vast carpet department was contracted to a secondary location allowing for the creation of a new perfumery and cosmetics hall at the centre of the ground floor. A new Allders store of 137,000 square feet (12,700 m^{2}) opened at Woking in 1992. Allders plc was floated on the stock market in 1993.

The growth of the group rapidly accelerated following stock market flotation with the acquisition of existing stores and the building of new ones. This began with the acquisition of Nottingham Co-op's lease on their Broad Marsh Centre store and the development of a chain of stand-alone home furnishing stores. The opening of a second Clover store at Rotherham was succeeded by the development of "At Home with Allders" a concept for new stores in out-of-town retail parks, the first of which opened at Aylesford in Kent in 1994. The Clover stores were both rebranded.

In September 1996 Allders purchased a number of department stores from the Owen Owen group that traded under the Lewis's and Owen Owen names. This included branches in Basingstoke, Coventry, Ilford, Leeds, Oxford, Redditch and Slough.

In 1997 Allders acquired the bankrupt Maples furniture brand and seven of its retail outlets. These stores were integrated into the Allders At Home portfolio and brought the brand to town centre locations in Bromley, Chelmsford, Crawley, Kingston upon Thames, Reading, Sutton Coldfield and Watford. The Bromley outlet, in direct competition with the town's main Allders store, was soon disposed of. The Kingston store, offering a range focussed solely on furniture, beds and carpets, struggled to compete with Bentalls and John Lewis. This competition in the town and the frontage of the store being obscured for some time whilst work on the Kingston Bridge was carried out led to the store's closure within two years. A second Kingston store was later opened in the former C & A building, offering a broader range of merchandise for the home.

== Decline ==
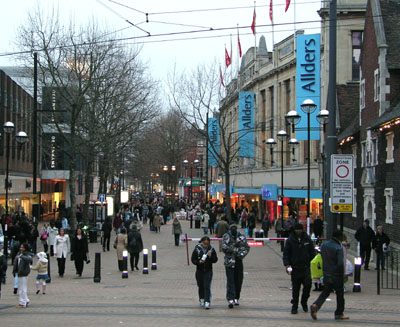
North End and Allders in 2005

Shares in Allders crashed in 1998 after disappointing sales and difficulties integrating the Maples furniture group. Nevertheless, it continued a policy of expansion, acquiring the premises of the former C & A stores at Guildford, Kingston upon Thames, Leicester, Sheffield (Meadowhall), and York in 2000 and later the large C & A building on the south side of Oxford Street in London. The "At Home with Allders" trading name was replaced with "Allders At Home" on conversion of a number of the C&A stores to an expanded home format. Problems continued, however. In Croydon, there were plans to build a new shopping centre, Park Place, on the store's site and much of the area to the south. A new Allders would be built opposite the Town Hall. Croydon Council's partner in this plan was developer Minerva plc. In late 2002 Minerva was part of a new group called Scarlett Retail, named after Terry Green's daughter, that bid for Allders, with Lehman Brothers investment bank and a management team including Terry Green, the former chief executive of Debenhams and BHS.

Some felt at the time that Scarlett's bid was based on Minerva's intention to acquire Allders' site for its Park Place project, in order to sell the plot to another retailer, probably John Lewis. The bid was felt by many to be overpriced. Nevertheless, Scarlett paid Tom Hunter an improved price and they landed the company in early 2003 for about £162m ($316m). Green became chief executive and set about an overhaul of Allders' image. It was claimed that some of the traditional homeware, haberdashery and clothing for middle-aged, middle-income women was reduced, with a new emphasis on young fashion and beauty products, though this was denied by Terry Green.

== Administration, 2004–2005 ==
In September 2004, Minerva announced that Allders had made a loss of £22.6m for the year to 30 June 2004, blaming the speed of the transformation of the business. In December 2004, it announced the business was up for sale. There was some early interest that Primark was to purchase some of the stores but no interest was found in taking on the company as a whole and it was placed in administration on 26 January 2005. It was revealed that there was a pensions deficit of £15 million. 130 of the staff at the Croydon headquarters were laid off, including Green and other senior managers. An under-construction store at the Drake Circus Shopping Centre in Plymouth was never opened and was split into stores for Next and Primark when the centre opened in October 2006.

Kroll, the administrators, searched for buyers for the chain or individual stores. Of Allders' 50 stores, only 35 received offers, with rival retailers such as House of Fraser, BHS, Debenhams and Primark said to have expressed an interest. The ten remaining stores, including the Oxford Street branch, began closing-down sales on 5 February and had started to close from March 2005: all had closed by May 2005 with the Leeds store being the last to close down on 22 May 2005, with the exception of Croydon.

== Croydon store, 2005–2013 ==
In May 2005 it was announced that the owners of Jaeger would take on the flagship Croydon store and that it would continue to trade as Allders. In the first year of operation the new managing director, Andrew MacKenzie, turned the fortunes of the company around and projected a £1 million gross profit. Significant investment was made to attract back to the store its Croydon audience. It was the only Allders store to survive the 2005 administration.

In April 2006 it was announced that Allders had secured an extension to their lease through to 2008. The land and store that Allders leased had regular break clauses to the benefit of the "virtual freehold leaseholder" held by Minerva plc subsidiary companies for 250 years. The freehold interest was held by the Whitgift Foundation. Development plans by Minerva for a 1.08 million sq.ft shopping centre were complicated by uncertainty over its tenancy, and competition from the new 1.615 million sq.ft Westfield development at White City, and the 1.3 million sq.ft shopping development at Bluewater to the east of London.

In December 2011, Allders director Max Menon was named as new chairman of Croydon Business Improvement District.

Allders of Croydon was placed into administration on 15 June 2012. It was blamed on the "tough market conditions of the retail sector" at the time. The administrators Duff & Phelps failed in their search for a new investor and Allders finally closed down after the last day of trading on 22 September 2012. It was reported in Scotland on Sunday that Metis, a Glasgow-based intellectual property firm were looking to sell brands that were owned by Allders. Along with the Allders name, the administrators were seeking to sell furniture brands Maples and Waring & Gillow. Allders ceased trading on 17 January 2013. Later that year the Croydon building reopened as "Croydon Village Outlet".

In July 2019, Croydon Council took possession of the site as part of the proposed redevelopment of the Centrale and Whitgift Centre shopping malls. Businesses and franchises within the Village Outlet had to move or close altogether.

In 2018 Allders purchased the rights to the Co-op Department Store in Paisley, Renfrewshire, at the Paisley Centre and set up a department store on three floors. In May 2021 it was announced by Allders that the Paisley Store was to close down and a closing down sale began, closing in July 2021

== Former locations ==
=== Department stores ===
- Basildon (opened 1985; now Debenhams) Closed 2021.
- Basingstoke (former Owen Owen; now Primark)
- Bromley, 162 High Street (formerly Medhursts / F Medhurst; now Primark)
- Camberley (formerly Pages / James Page; now partly occupied by British Heart Foundation)
- Cardiff (formerly Mackross; site redeveloped as Queens Arcade)
- Chatham (opened November 1979; became Debenhams, closed 15 January 2020)
- Clapham Junction (formerly Arding & Hobbs; building divided and subsequently occupied by Debenhams and T K Maxx with a section of the Ilminster Gardens range redeveloped for residential use; Debenhams closed 23 March 2020)
- Coventry (former Owen Owen; now Primark)
- Croydon (flagship store, traded until September 2012; building since occupied by Croydon Village Outlet, closed 2019)
- Eltham (formerly Hinds; building since occupied by Sports Direct, Carpetright, Peacocks and Bathstore)
- Horsham (building since occupied by Beales, 2006–2019; now Dunelm)
- Hull (formerly Willis Ludlow / Willis Brothers; now Primark)
- Ilford (former Owen Owen; now Debenhams)
- Ipswich (former Owen Owen; became T J Hughes, since redeveloped for T K Maxx and Empire Cinema)
- Lakeside (former Bentalls; now Primark)
- Leeds (former Lewis's; building repurposed as office and retail space for tenants including Sainsbury's, Argos, T K Maxx and Clas Ohlson)
- Leicester (former C&A; now Primark)
- London, Oxford Street (former C&A flagship store; originally the 489–497 Oxford Street branch of Gamages; now Primark)
- Newcastle upon Tyne, John Farnon
- Nottingham (former Nottingham Co-operative Society department store; became T K Maxx; now vacant)
- Oxford (opened 1996). Originally G R Cooper, bought by Selfridges in 1966. Original store demolished 1973 as part of Westgate development and replaced with new store. Rebranded Lewis's in 1989. Later Primark 2006-2016 when they relocated to a larger unit in the extended part of the centre; original store partially demolished in 2016, now smaller units
- Paisley former Co-op Department Store
- Portsmouth (formerly Landport Drapery Bazaar; now Debenhams)
- Redditch (former Owen Owen; now Primark)
- Romford (became Boundary Mill Stores; now Iceland and The Range)
- Slough (former Owen Owen; originally Suters; became Debenhams, closed 23 March 2020)
- Southport (now The Range)
- Sutton, High Street (formerly Shinners; closed 1992 on relocation to St Nicholas Shopping Centre; main building demolished with redeveloped site partly occupied by Woolworths 1994–2008 and now Waterstones; former furniture building now occupied by Wilko; Hill Road building now occupied by Wetherspoons). This store featured in the second episode of the ITV comedy series Mr. Bean from 1990, where in the episode titled "The Return of Mr. Bean", Mr. Bean shops in the department store, with the name Allders clearly seen throughout.
- Sutton, St Nicholas Shopping Centre (opened 1992 on relocation from High Street; now Debenhams)
- Woking (opened 1992; now Debenhams)

=== Home stores ===
- Aylesford (Allders at Home / At Home with Allders; became BHS until closure in 2016, since redeveloped for Smyths Toys and M&S Food Hall)
- Bolton
- Bromley, 44 High Street (former Maples)
- Broughton, Flintshire (opened 1999; became BHS until closure in 2016, since redeveloped for Primark and OUTFIT)
- Chelmsford (former Maples; became Dansk Design, since redeveloped for multiple tenants including The Gym Group)
- Chichester (opened 1999; became BHS until closure in 2016)
- Chineham (building redeveloped for multiple tenants; now occupied by Matalan, M&S Foodhall and Poundland)
- Crawley (former Maples, Became T.K.Maxx)
- Guildford (former C&A; became Primark)
- Handforth (became BHS until closure in 2016)
- Kingston upon Thames, 2 Clarence Street (former Maples; now T K Maxx)
- Kingston upon Thames, 76 Eden Street (former C&A; now Primark)
- Kirkstall (Allders at Home / At Home with Allders / Clover / Ludlows / Thrift Stores; became BHS until closure in 2016, since demolished)
- Knaresborough (became BHS until closure in 2016)
- Leeds, Clover (formerly Ludlows)
- Lincoln (became BHS until closure in 2016)
- Northampton (became BHS until closure in 2016, since redeveloped for Iceland and The Range)
- Reading (building demolished; the site forms part of that now occupied by IKEA)
- Rotherham (At Home with Allders / Clover; closed to coincide with the opening of Meadowhall location)
- Sheffield, Meadowhall (Allders at Home; former C&A)
- Slough, Clover (former Grange furnishing store; opened 1981; closed 1983)
- Southampton (now Wickes)
- Sutton Coldfield (former Maples; now Aldi)
- Thornaby-on-Tees
- Watford (former Maples)
- York, Clifton Moor (now Wilko and Pets at Home)
- York, Coppergate (former C&A; now TopShop and Primark)

== Bibliography ==
- Huitson, Muriel; Gent, John B. (1988) [1970]. "Shopping and commerce: market town to modern city". In Gent, John B. (ed.). Croydon: the story of a hundred years (6th ed.). Croydon: Croydon Natural History & Scientific Society. pp. 24–28 (26–27). ISBN 0-906047-02-1.
- McInnes, Paula; Sparkes, Bill (1991). "The development of the retail trade in Croydon". One Hundred Years of Croydon at Work. Croydon: The Croydon Society/Croydon Chamber of Commerce and Industry. pp. 24–36 (24–27). ISBN 0-9512713-3-4.
- [Various authors] (1999). Memories of Croydon. Elland: True North Books. ISBN 1-900463-19-9.
