= Maple & Co. =

Furniture shop

Coordinates: 51.524°N 0.137°W

- Trade name: Maple & Co; Maple & Company; Maples
- Industry: Manufacture of furniture
- Founded: 1841; 185 years ago
- Founder: John Maple
- Defunct: 1997
- Headquarters: Tottenham Court Road, London

Maple & Co. was a British furniture and upholstery manufacturer established in 1841 which found particular success during the Victorian and Edwardian eras. The company became one of the prime makers and suppliers of furniture to the aristocracy and royalty in both the United Kingdom and around the world.

For the duration of their trading, the company resided in Tottenham Court Road in London but had trading locations as far as Paris, Buenos Aires, Montevideo and Smyrna.

== History ==
=== 1840s–1850s ===
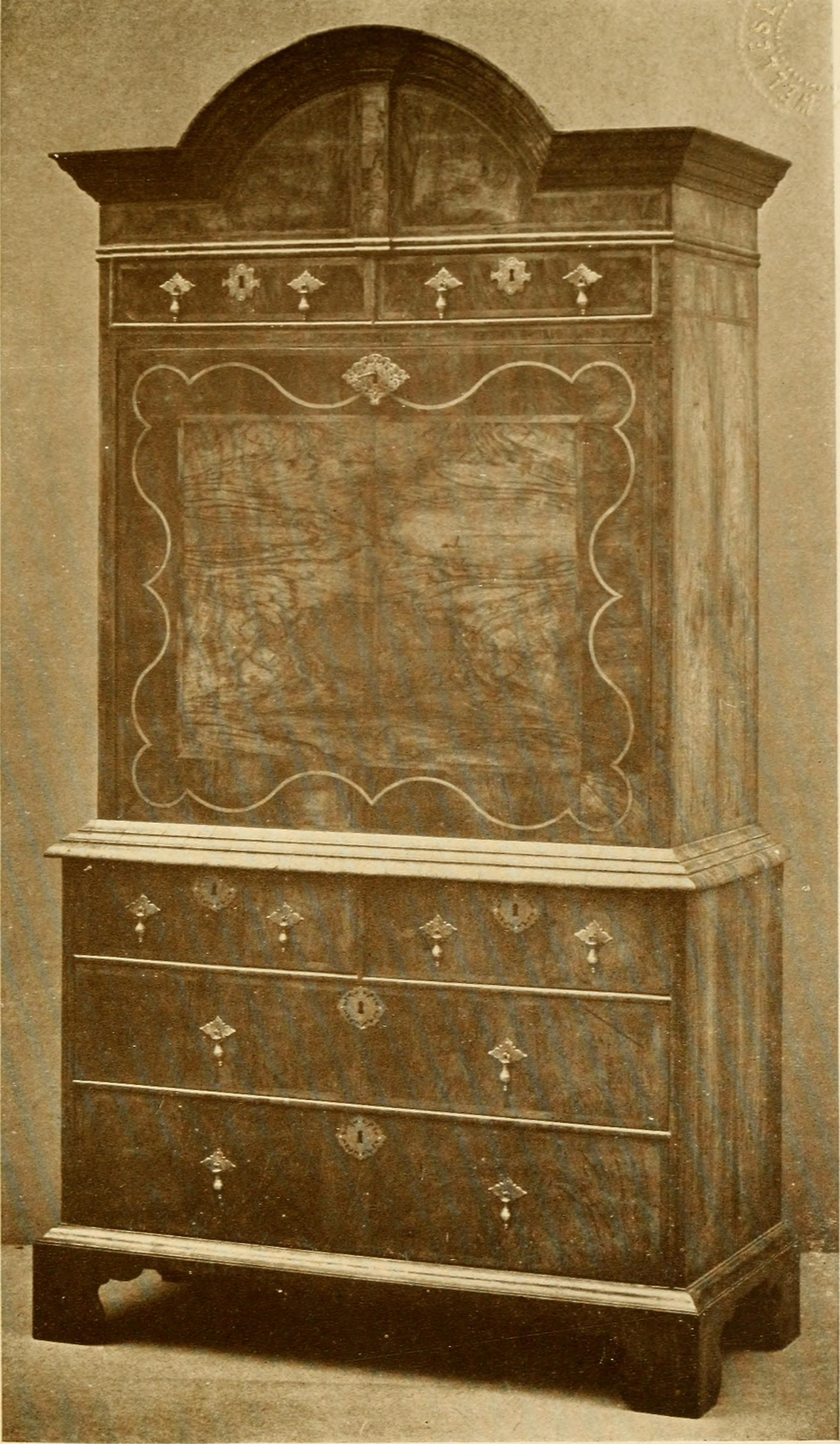
William and Mary walnut drop-front secretary with single hood top by Maple, around 1910

The company was founded by John Maple (28 February 1815 – 4 March 1900) in the early 19th century. After completing his apprenticeship with shopkeeper James Constable in Surrey, Maple partnered with his former co-worker James Cook and in the Spring of 1841 they opened Cook & Maple at 145 Tottenham Court Road. The company was set up as wholesale and retail drapers, carpet factors, cabinetmakers, and furnishing warehousemen.

In 1851, the partnership between John Maple and James Cook dissolved, leaving Maple as sole proprietor of the company. After the separation Cook managed his own store at number 22 & 23 Queens Buildings, London.

=== 1860s–1870s ===
Maple and his wife, Emily Blundell, gave birth to their first son Blundell Maple in 1845. In 1861, when he was 16, Blundell was already involved in his father's business. Blundell and his brother Harry were made partners of the firm in 1870. Harry would contract typhoid fever in 1879 and pass away aged 28 leaving Blundell as an equal partner in the business with his father.

From the 1850s, changes in distribution and marketing occurred which divided London into the retail district in the West End and the wholesale market of the East End. While at the end of the 18th century much of London's furniture was crafted in the West End, throughout the 19th century this experienced a shift and by the 1870s a market for less expensive goods led to large production from the East End. More of the West End retail companies began to outsource their goods and "by the late 1880s, for instance, Maple & Co. made less than 10 per cent of the goods they sold under their own label". One of the suppliers that produced bedroom and dining cabinets for Maple was Harris Lebus, a prolific East End furniture manufacturer.

=== 1880s–1910s ===
In order to cut out the middleman in the form of the wholesaler, furniture retailers sometimes went straight to the makers to purchase their goods. However, this could lead to circumvention of laws and underhand dealings. In 1888, Blundell Maple, now serving as a member of parliament, was brought for questioning by the Select Committee on the Sweating System after a series of allegations were brought forward accusing Maples of sweating. These accusations involved Maples taking advantage of the craftsmen by overcharging for materials, delaying payment for items and offering loans to small companies to cover the cost of completing large orders from Maples themselves. In the hearing, Maple admitted to purchasing goods from about 1,000 shops that were located around Tottenham Court Road and the East End.

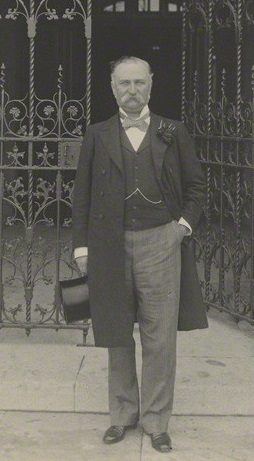
John Maple's son, John Blundell Maple was made a co-partner of the company with his brother in 1870; image by John Benjamin Stone, 1901.

Despite this controversy, Maples continued to grow and in the 1883 edition of A Dictionary of Common Wants, the entry for Maple & Co. read:

"MESSRS. MAPLE & CO., 145, 146, 147, 148, 149, Tottenham Court Road, W.C., undertake, in both town and country, every description of Artistic Decorations, Parquet Flooring, Solid Oak Doors, Dadoes, &c., and complete House Furnishing. The showrooms cover an area of more than five acres which will give some idea of the extent of the business carried on; but no adequate conception can be formed of the magnitude and variety of the stock without the intending purchaser pays a personal visit to the establishment”.

By 1889, Maple & Co. occupied the block surrounded by Tottenham Court Road, Euston Road, Gower Street and Grafton Way.

Maples association with the royal family was strong and throughout its history the company furnished numerous royal palaces and cottages. By 1892, Maples held the title of 'Upholsterers by special appointment to her majesty Queen Victoria'. The Royal connection continued and in 1910, when Edward VII died, Maples were appointed 'Upholsters and Decorators to his majesty George V'. Maples used this prestige to their advantage and printed the royal crest in the corner of their trade cards along with their royal title. This was used until at least the 1950s and is evidenced by a trade card held by the Brotherton Library Special Collections archive at the University of Leeds. The trade card is held as part of the John Evan Bedford Library of Furniture History and shows an inscription reading 'Upholsterers and decorators by appointment to the late King George V'. Maples' clients also included the Russian emperor and kings of other countries in Europe as well as Siam (Thailand) and the Grand Vizier of Persia.

== Charity work ==
In 1897, John Blundell Maple provided £150,000 for the construction of an almshouse (later known as Maple Flats) and a convalescent home designed specifically for Maple & Co. workers. These were designed as accommodation which would look after the loyal workers and a way to give something back for their hard work. The building, now converted to flats inside, still stands under its original title, Akrill House.

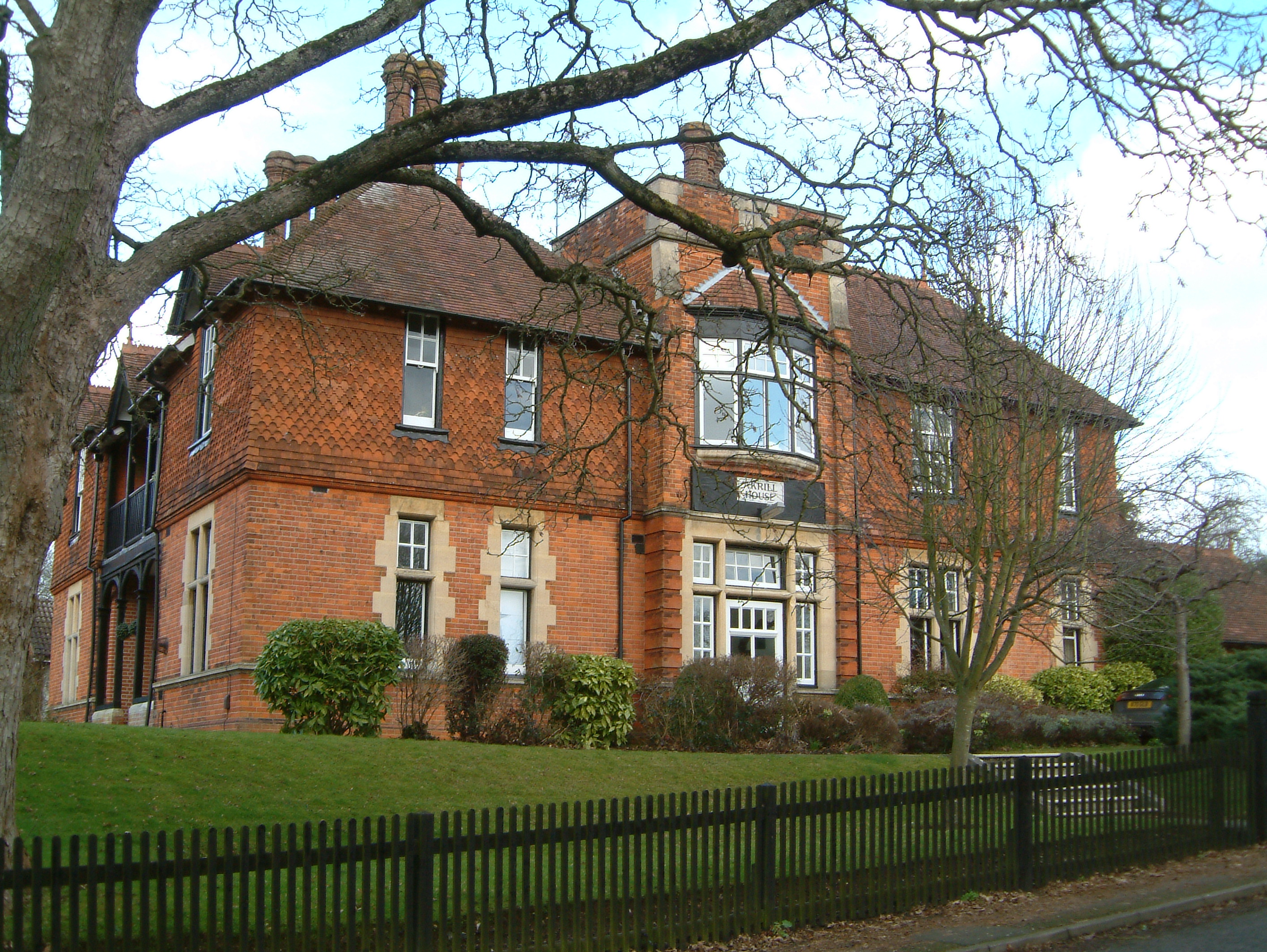
Akrill House - Harpenden

== Incidents ==
Maple & Co. suffered a number of unfortunate incidents throughout the course of their development. On the morning of 11 May 1857, the walls between the Maples' store and the adjoining house suffered a collapse. The destruction killed six people, some of whom were employees of Maples who were residing on the top floors ready for work in the morning. When John Maple arrived at the scene he told reporters that the collapse had caused around £10,000 worth of damage in addition to the £2,400 of destroyed furniture.

Furthermore, in December 1871, a fire broke out in the store causing £45,000 worth of damage to buildings and stock which included 80 fine wardrobes. The only reason the fire did not cause more damage was due to the iron doors installed throughout the building which were closed each night and which stopped the fire from advancing.

In 1897, another fire broke out in the Maple's Camden Depository destroying most of the building including the stock inside.

A store was destroyed in the 1993 Bournemouth bombing.

== Decline ==
After the end of World War II, a change in tastes and the cost manufacturing factors contributed to a decline in sales. In 1980, the furniture maker Waring & Gillow joined with Maple & Co., to become Maple, Waring & Gillow. It subsequently became part of Allied Maples Group Ltd, which included Allied Carpets when it was acquired by supermarket chain Asda in 1988. A management buyout from Asda took place in 1993. In 1997 the company went into administration; put down by receivers Deloitte & Touche to poor trading and high debts. At the time, the business had 24 stores and employed 340 staff. It was taken over by the retailer Allders.

From 1901, electrical power to the London shop was supplied by a 140-bhp three-cylinder Willans engine steam generating set. This was retired in 1957 and placed on display at the original Willans factory in Rugby. In 2011 it was recognised with an Engineering Heritage Award. In 2017 it was transferred to the Internal Fire Museum of Power in West Wales.

== List of notable commissions ==
Maple & Co. became one of the most fashionable brands in Victorian and Edwardian Britain and supplied furniture and interior decoration to a number of high status individuals, including various strains of royal families.

This list is a selection of particularly notable commissions held by Maple & Co. and the date of the commission.

- White Lodge, Richmond Park (1870)
- The Grand Hotel, Trafalgar Square, London (1885)
- Constitutional Club, London (1885)
- York Cottage, Sandringham Estate, Norfolk, England
- Supplied furniture for the ships: QE1 (1938), QE2 and the Queen Mary
- Crossrigg Hall, Penrith, Cumbria
- Rashtrapati Niwas (formerly known as the Viceregal Lodge), residence of the Viceroy of India, Simla (1892)

== See also ==
- Waring & Gillow
- Gillows of Lancaster and London
- Druce & Co.
- National Amalgamated Furnishing Trades Association
