= Arding & Hobbs =

Former department store in Battersea, London

Coordinates: 51.463475°N 0.167371°W

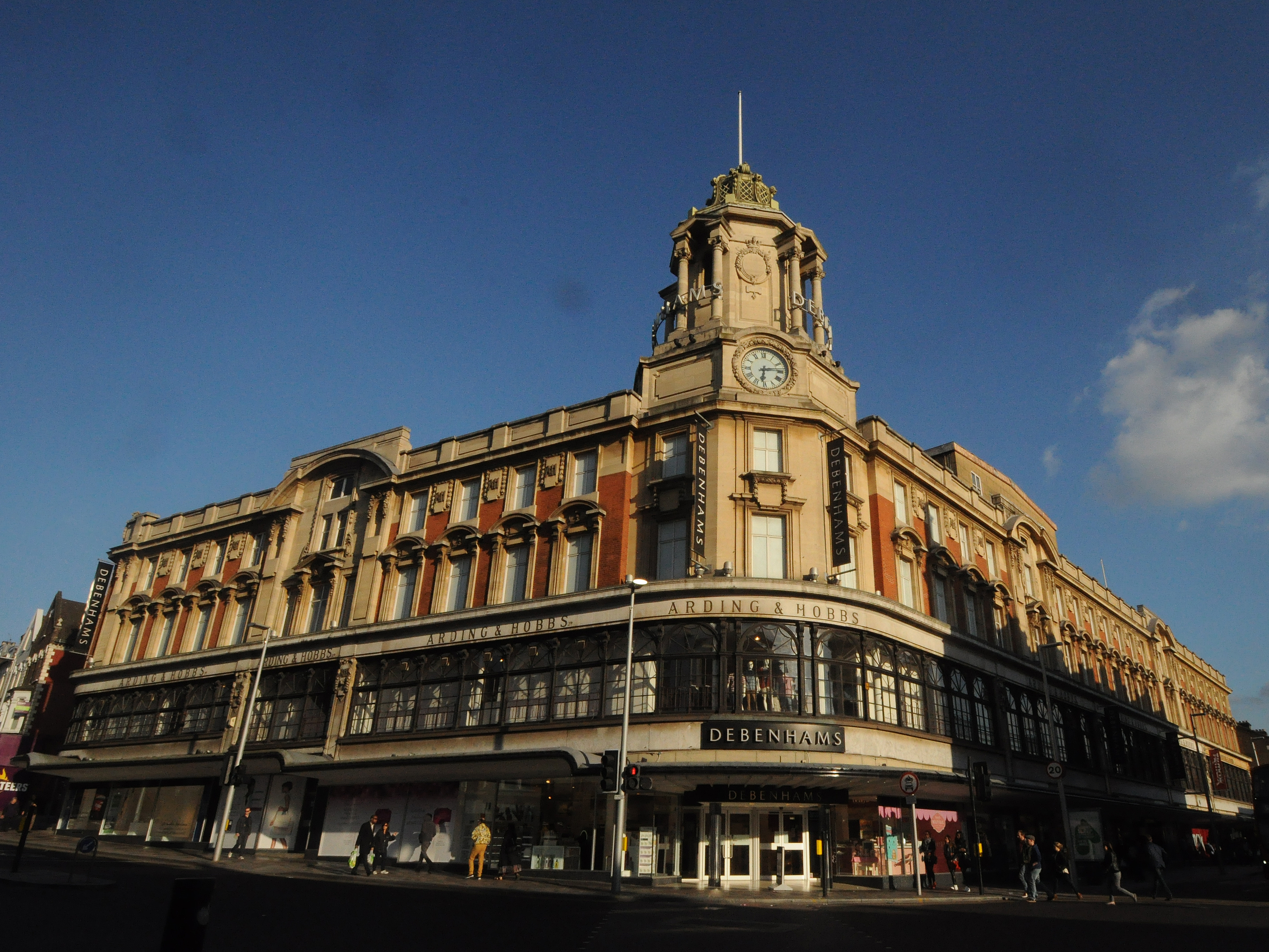
Arding & Hobbs

Arding & Hobbs is a former department store and Grade II listed building at the junction of Lavender Hill and St John's Road, Battersea, in the London Borough of Wandsworth.

Arding & Hobbs was established in 1876. A second store was established on the corner of Falcon Road, Battersea, known as the Falcon Road Drapery Store, but this was sold to former employees Mr. Hunt & Mr. Cole in 1894. The original building was destroyed by a fire on 20 December 1909. The present building was constructed in 1910 in an Edwardian Baroque style, and the architect was James Gibson.

The department store was sold to the John Anstiss Group in 1938, however, John Anstiss was purchased by United Drapery Stores in 1948. The store was added to the Allders group in the 1970s and continued to operate until Allders went into administration in 2005. The building was subsequently broken up and sold, with the building split between a branch of Debenhams department store and TK Maxx retail. As of 9 June 2020, the Debenhams section of the building had been permanently closed.

The store and building are featured in a number of films and television programmes including the 1981 action-thriller Nighthawks, where the shop was bombed, and the 1994 Mr. Bean episode "Do-It-Yourself Mr. Bean". It is very prominent in the video "Life On Your Own" by the band The Human League which is set in a future, apocalyptic London where the lead singer is the only person left alive and lives in the building.

The building underwent a major refurbishment by architects Stiff + Trevillion which won a 2026 RIBA National Award.
