= Charles Clore =

British businessman (1904–1979)

Sir Charles Clore
- Born: 26 December 1904; London, England
- Died: 26 July 1979 (aged 74); Westminster, London, England
- Occupation: Financier
- Spouse: Francine Halphen (m. 1943; dissolved 1957)
- Children: 2 (Alan, Vivien)

Sir Charles Clore (26 December 1904 – 26 July 1979) was a British financier, retail and property magnate, and philanthropist.

== Biography ==
Clore was of Lithuanian Jewish background, the son of Israel Clore, a Whitechapel tailor who had emigrated to London, and later to Palestine. Clore moved to Birmingham and went to Montgomery Street School. He worked at his father's textile business but then moved to South Africa at the age of 20.

Clore first made money buying and selling South African film rights to a world championship boxing match between Gene Tunney and Jack Dempsey in 1926. In 1930 he bought Cricklewood ice rink but sold this to acquire the Prince of Wales Theatre near Leicester Square. He also invested in Lyndenburg Estates, a South African gold mining company. In 1939, he led a syndicate to acquire London Casino.

After the war, he made more acquisitions, including a shareholding in Park Royal Vehicles, a textile mill in Yorkshire, and Richard Shops (a women's fashion retailer). In 1949, he sold Richard Shops to United Drapery Stores for £800,000, an increase of £755,000 on his initial investment. From 1945 to 1947, he owned Jowett Cars Ltd, where he was known as "Santa Clore" for his much anticipated financial investment. In 1951, he acquired the Furness Shipbuilding Company and in 1954, bought J. Sears & Co for £4 million. Through Sears, Clore came to form the British Shoe Corporation, which became the biggest shoe retailer in the United Kingdom. He also owned Lewis's department stores (which included Selfridges), jewellers Mappin & Webb and Garrard & Co, as well as investing heavily in property. In 1960, his City and Central Investments merged with Jack Cotton's City Centre Properties, uniting two of the country's largest property companies. City and Central had just acquired 40 Wall Street and City Centre Properties was constructing the Pan Am Building over the Grand Central Terminal in New York City.

In 1959, Clore acquired Stype Grange in Berkshire, near Hungerford, from Lord Rootes; he lived there for 20 years. In 1961, he acquired 16,000 acres of land in Herefordshire between Hereford and Ross-on-Wye, which had previously been owned by Guy's Hospital. Clore owned several good racehorses, notably Valoris which won the Epsom Oaks in 1966.

Clore was knighted in the 1971 Queen's Birthday Honours List for his philanthropic work.

Clore and his wife Francine had two children, Vivien and Alan Evelyn Clore. Clore Shipping Company had two oil tankers, the Vivien Louise and the Alan Evelyn. In 1957, the Clore and Francine marriage came to an end.

Clore was one of Britain's richest men and became a tax exile in Monaco in 1976, after his retirement as chairman of Sears. He died of cancer in 1979 at The London Clinic. He wanted his fortune, worth almost £100 million, to go to his charitable foundations but, upon his death, the Inland Revenue sued, claiming he was British domiciled (he had claimed Monaco domicile), in order to collect inheritance taxes. His son Alan also challenged the will claiming that he was entitled to a share of the estate. The court upheld the Inland Revenue position.

== Philanthropy ==
In 1964, he created the Clore Foundation, a philanthropic trust providing support in Israel and the United Kingdom for hospitals, universities and cultural organisations. In 1967, he provided the Charles Clore Pavilion for Mammals at London Zoo. In 1976, he provided the lion terraces there too. After his death, his daughter Vivian became the chair of the foundation and, in 2000, she merged her foundation with the Clore Foundation to create the Clore Duffield Foundation, which is a donor to arts and Jewish community projects in Britain and abroad. The first major project after Charles' death was the creation of the Clore Gallery at Tate Britain in London, which houses the world's largest collection of the works of J. M. W. Turner, and was built in 1980–87 with £6 million from Clore and his daughter and £1.8 million from the British government.

== Legacy and commemoration ==
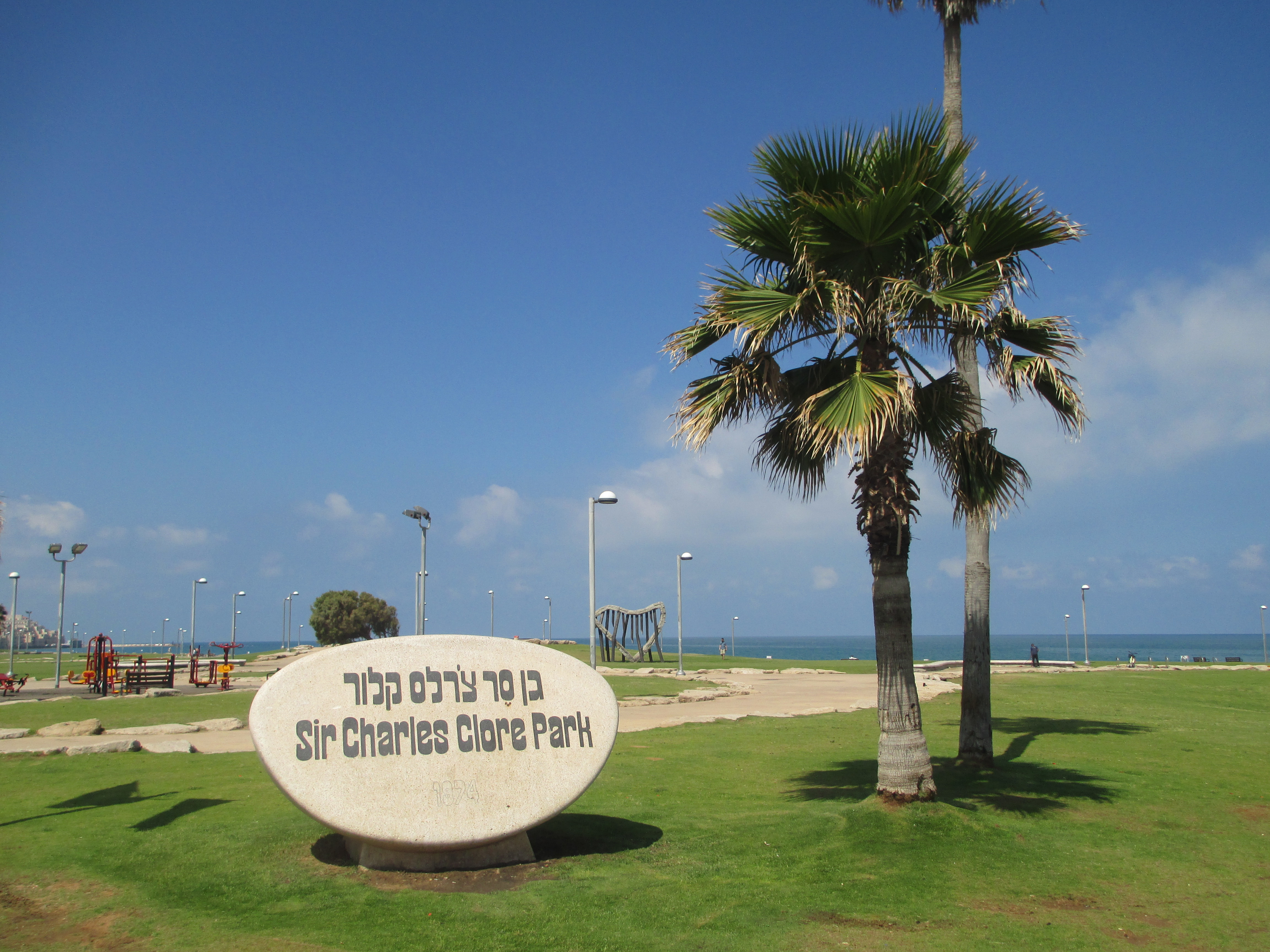
Charles Clore Park, Tel Aviv

The beachfront Charles Clore Park in Tel Aviv is named after Clore. It stretches across 30 acres, and families use the seaside park to celebrate birthdays and host barbecues, or even attend city-wide events such as Tel Aviv Pride. His father, who died in 1933, is buried in nearby Petah Tikvah.

In September 1980 thieves stole 19 paintings worth £3 million from Clore's Monaco apartment, including works by Renoir, Monet, Pissarro and Utrillo. Clore's former butler, Ronald Headford, was found lying on the floor of the apartment after the theft, claiming that he had been attacked by the thieves, but was later found to have collaborated with them. Headford later committed suicide in Monaco's prison.

Clore was depicted in Stephen Ward the Musical, Andrew Lloyd Webber's musical based on the Profumo affair; he was loosely connected, having been a client of Christine Keeler. In 2014 Clore's daughter, Vivien Duffield, saw the musical with William Astor, whose father, William Astor, 3rd Viscount Astor, was also depicted.

== See also ==
- London Zoo: zoo exhibits funded by Charles Clore.
- Charles Clore Park
