= Richard Shops =

British fashion retailer

- Company type: Private
- Industry: Retail
- Founded: 1936
- Defunct: 1999
- Fate: Dormant company
- Successor: Arcadia Group
- Headquarters: London, UK
- Key people: John Sofio, Charles Clore, Joseph Collier

Richard Shops was a British high street retailer of women's fashion.

== History ==
Richard Shops was founded in 1936 by John Sofio, who modelled the business on the US company Lerner Brothers. The company was bankrupt by 1941 and was purchased by Charles Clore for £45,000, who subsequently expanded the business before selling it on for £800,000 in 1949 to United Drapery Stores.

Richards was managed by Rudy Weil until his retirement in the mid-1970s. From the 1960s to the 1990s, an expansion of the number of stores saw it as a ubiquitous part of almost every British high street and shopping centre, selling fashion clothing designed to appeal to young women. In the 1970s a hugely popular television advertisement began to appear with a memorable jingle, also used for radio advertisements on Capital Radio.

In 1983 UDS was sold to Hanson plc. Hanson started selling off parts of UDS to pay for its purchase. Fellow UDS bedfellow John Collier was purchased in a management buyout, but Richard Shops' management were unable to raise the capital and it was bought by the newly formed retail group Habitat/Mothercare plc, and became part of Storehouse plc after the merger of Habitat/Mothercare with British Home Stores in 1986.

With the financial troubles suffered by the Storehouse group in the late 1980s, Richard Shops began to lose direction at a time when the high street was becoming a more competitive place for fashion retailers. Since 1972 the men's clothing retailer Burton had been expanding its chain of women's fashion stores under the TopShop brand, and in 1979 it acquired Richard Shops' long-time rival Dorothy Perkins. A more direct assault on Richard Shops came in 1984 from the Burton Group, as Burton was now called, when it launched the unisex fashion chain Principles. Not only did Principles manage to capture something of the mood of the late 1980s in its designs, but it represented the most direct assault to date by Burton on the largely middle-class customer base of Richard Shops. In 1985, Richard Shops had to cancel a contract with South African suppliers over campaigns against apartheid.

In 1988 Storehouse appointed a new chief executive, Michael Julien, with Sir Terence Conran becoming chairman, and the group was reorganised into three divisions, with Richard Shops sharing 'Speciality Retailing' with the group's brands Mothercare, Blazer, Anonymous, and Jacadi.

In 1992 Richard Shops was sold to Clore's former company, the British retailing giant Sears plc (not to be confused with the American stores of the same name), the then owner of the London department store Selfridges, and the women's clothing retailers Wallis, Miss Selfridge and Outfit. In 1999 Sir Philip Green, who had acquired Sears plc, transferred Richard Shops, along with Wallis, to the Arcadia Group which immediately announced the closure of all branches of Richard Shops, or their conversion to other Arcadia brands.
