= Sir Henry Price, 1st Baronet =

British businessman and philanthropist

Sir Henry Price
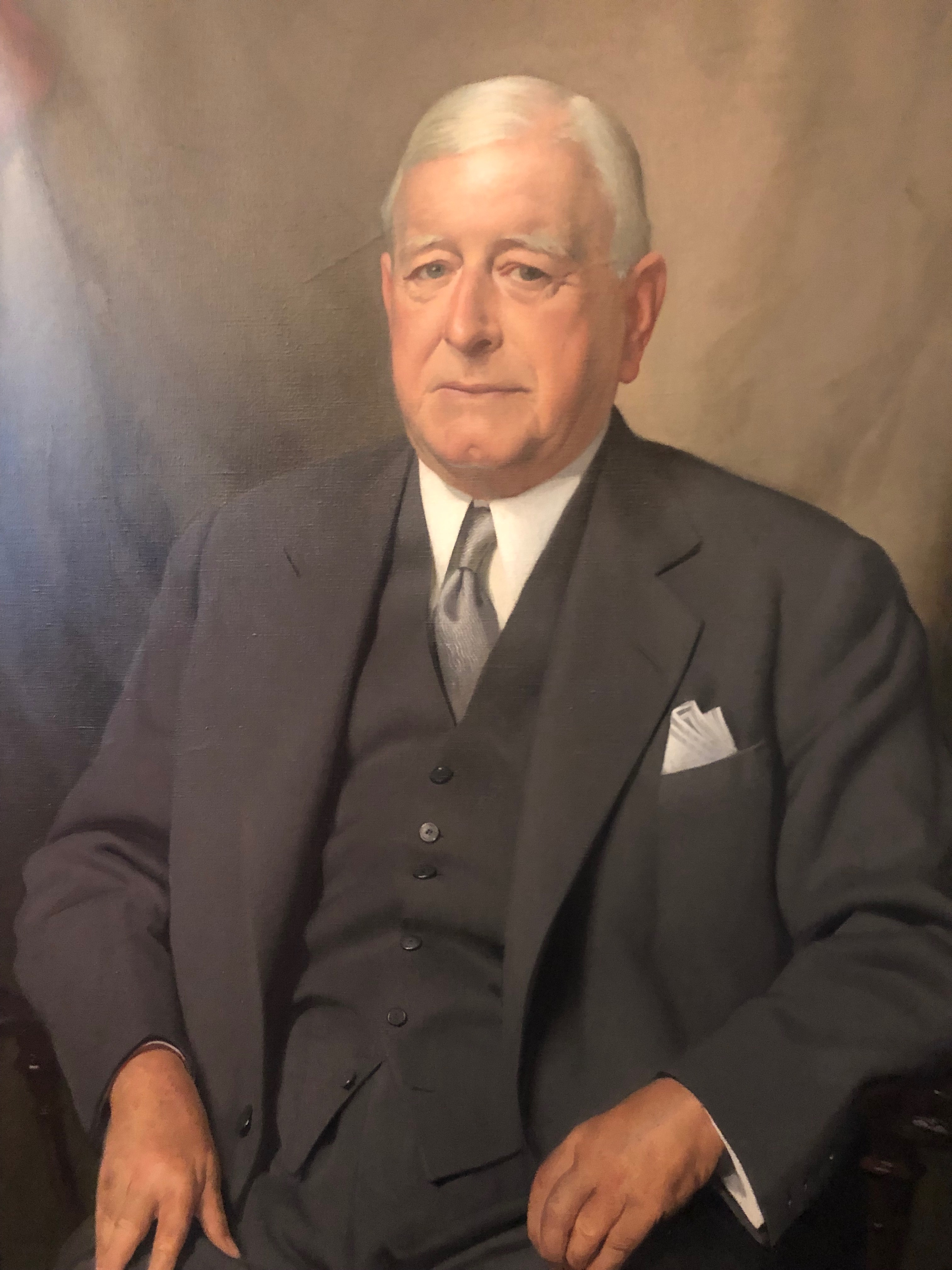
- Born: Henry Philip Price; 17 February 1877; Leeds, Yorkshire, England
- Died: 12 December 1963 (aged 86); At sea en route to Jamaica
- Occupations: Tailor, businessman, philanthropist
- Spouse: Annie Craggs
- Children: 2

Sir Henry Philip Price, 1st Baronet (17 February 1877 – 12 December 1963) was a British businessman and philanthropist.

Price was born in Leeds to Joseph Price and Elizabeth Helen Price. In 1919, he opened a tailor's shop in Silsden, then in the West Riding of Yorkshire now West Yorkshire.

He prospered by introducing the suit to those who previously could not afford one. A factory in Leeds produced the suits, which were ordered by customers from the company's branches. The company was known as the Fifty Shilling Tailors, £2.50 in current terms but not current monetary worth; for example, 50 shillings in 1940 had a purchasing value of approximately £70.00 in today's financial market (value as of 2005).

In 1953, the company was bought by United Drapery Stores, who used one of the Price group's trade names, John Collier.

Sir Henry Price used part of his fortune in the promotion of botany and has a garden named after him at Kew Gardens. In 1938, he bought Wakehurst Place, an Elizabethan mansion built in 1590 and set in 500 acres, which he left to the nation in 1963 and the Royal Botanic Gardens, Kew took a lease on it from the National Trust in 1965. It is now the home of the Millennium Seed Bank as well as a number of National Collections of trees (birch, beech and Skimmia family of shrubs).

A University of Leeds student accommodation built in the 60s on Clarendon Road, Leeds was named after him.

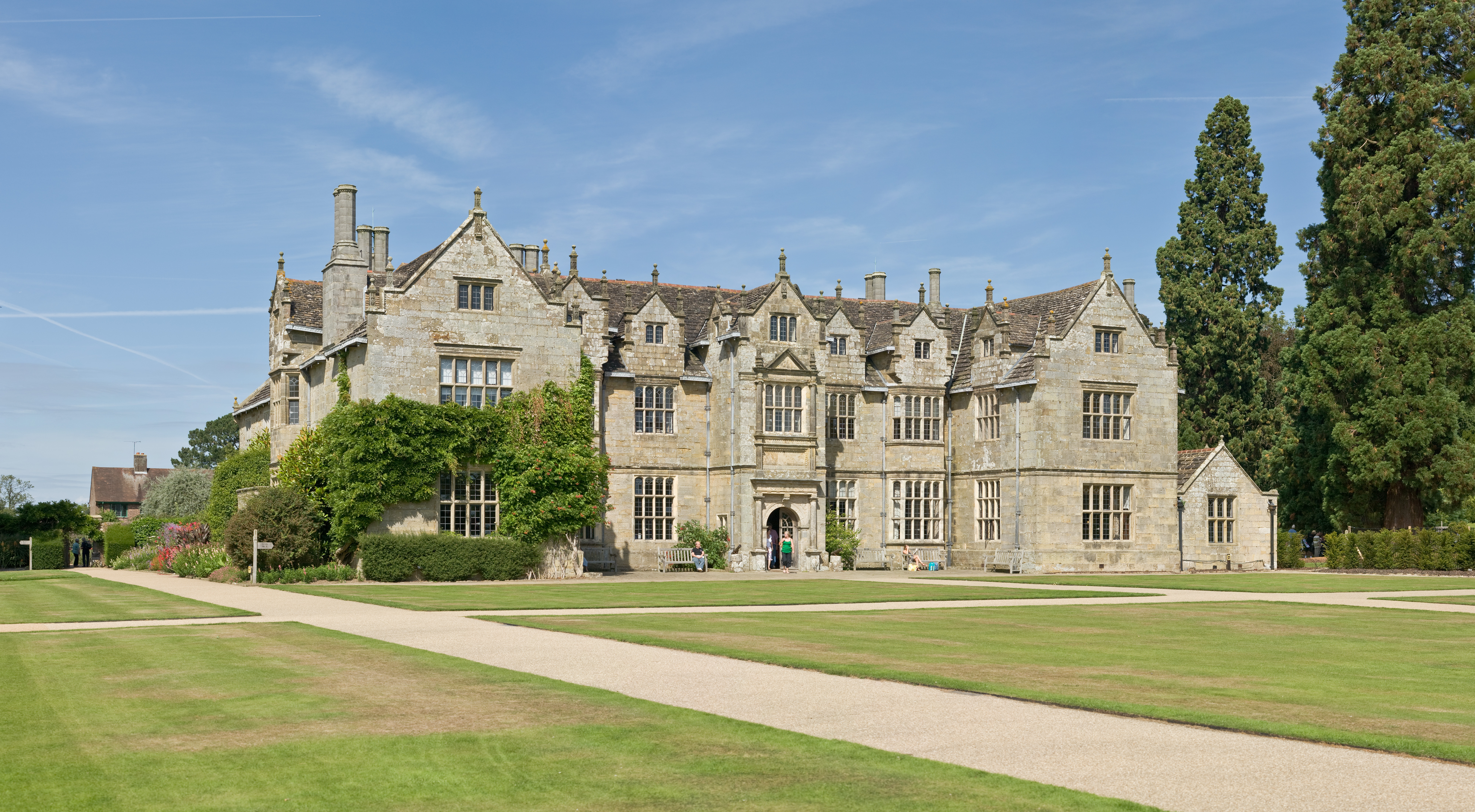
Wakehurst Place that he left to the National Trust, leased by Kew

He was also a generous benefactor of Chatham House (the Royal Institute of International Affairs) at 10 St James's Square and provided the funds in 1943 for The Institute to acquire the adjoining freehold of 9 St. James's Square (formerly the Portland Club) to expand its premises. Chatham House's Henry Price Room was named in gratitude for his support over the years.

In 1953, he was created a Baronet of Ardingly, in the Baronetage of the United Kingdom.

He married Annie Craggs in 1899. They adopted two children. The baronetcy became extinct upon his death.

Baronetage of the United Kingdom
New creation	Baronet (of Ardingly); 1953–1963	Extinct
