= Wheeler baronets =

Baronetcy in the Baronetage of the United Kingdom

The Wheeler Baronetcy, of Woodhouse Eaves in the County of Leicester, is a title in the Baronetage of the United Kingdom. It was created on 7 February 1920 for the stockbroker and financier Arthur Wheeler.

== Wheeler baronets, of Woodhouse Eaves (1920) ==
- Sir Arthur Wheeler, 1st Baronet (1860–1943)
- Sir Arthur Frederick Pullman Wheeler, 2nd Baronet (1900–1964)
- Sir John Hieron Wheeler, 3rd Baronet (1905–2005)
- Sir John Frederick Wheeler, 4th Baronet (born 1933)

The heir apparent is the present holder's son John Radford Wheeler (born 1965).
