= Heidelberg Materials UK =

British building materials company

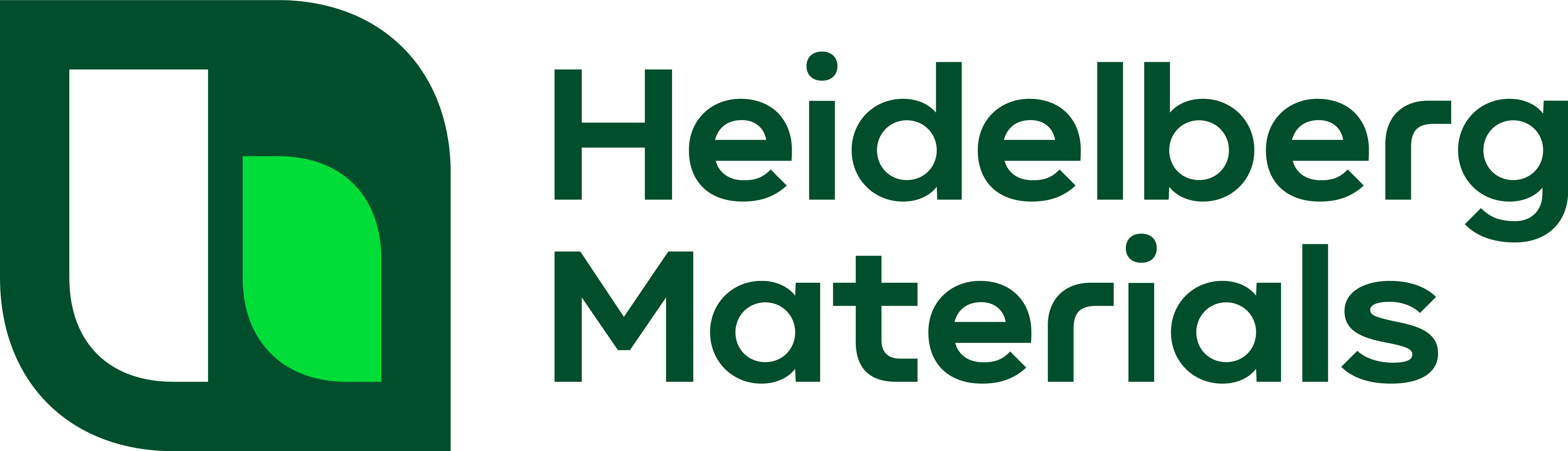
- Type: Subsidiary
- Traded as: (as Hanson) LSE: HAN
- Industry: Minerals
- Founded: 1964; 62 years ago as Hanson Trust Ltd
- Headquarters: London, England
- Key people: Simon Willis (Chief executive officer)
- Products: Building materials
- Revenue: £4,133m (2006)
- Operating income: £563m (2006)
- Net income: £401m (2006)
- Number of employees: 3,500 (2019)
- Parent: HeidelbergCement
- Website: heidelbergmaterials.co.uk

Heidelberg Materials UK is a British-based building materials company, headquartered in Maidenhead. Previously known as Hanson UK, the company has been a subsidiary of the German company HeidelbergCement since August 2007, and was formerly listed on the London Stock Exchange and a constituent of the FTSE 100 Index.

Originally trading as Wiles Group; the company was transformed into Hanson Trust Ltd by James Hanson and Gordon White in 1964. Over a thirty year period, Hanson pursued a principal strategy of raising shareholder value through a series of acquisitions. Several large businesses were purchased throughout the 1980s, such as the United Drapery Stores in 1983, Imperial Tobacco in 1986 and Kidde in 1987. Some of these acquisitions drew criticism and opposition. During 1991, Hanson Plc attempted its largest-yet acquisition of Imperial Chemical Industries (ICI), but this was hotly contested and ultimately unsuccessful.

By the start of the 1990s, Hanson Plc had become a sizable conglomerate and one of the largest firms based in Britain. However, amid negative perceptions of the conglomerate model, the company was reorganised into four separate listed firms during the mid 1990s, these being: Hanson plc, Imperial Tobacco, The Energy Group and Millennium Chemicals. In 2007, HeidelbergCement purchased Hanson Plc in exchange for £8 billion to create the second largest cement and building materials company in the world. In October 2023, the company announced that it was rebranding as Heidelberg Materials.

== History ==
=== Growth through acquisition ===
Originally known as Hanson Trust plc, the company was built up by James Hanson, later Lord Hanson, and Gordon White, later Baron White of Hull, who created Hanson Trust out of the former Wiles Group in 1964.

Hanson and White were willing to take a wide range of measures to maximise value, including mass redundancies, and therefore attracted opposition and accusations that they were asset strippers. From 1979, the company was successful from the shareholders' point of view and respected during the early 1980s; Hanson (who donated millions of pounds to the Conservatives) was given a life peerage by Britain's then-Prime Minister, Margaret Thatcher, in June 1983. It has been alleged that Hanson benefitted from political favouritism that may have swayed decisions made by the Monopolies and Mergers Commission (MMC).

One of the most notable takeovers, at least to the general public, was the acquisition in 1983, of the United Drapery Stores (otherwise known as UDS Group), which owned many of Britain's most well known high street clothes shops and department stores, including John Collier, Richard Shops and the chain of Allders department stores. To fund this purchase, Hanson broke up UDS and sold John Collier via a management buyout and Richard Shops to Habitat, keeping only the core department store business. In January 1986, Hanson bought SCM, an American chemicals to typewriters business, which included the paper division that was formerly the Allied Paper Corporation. Hanson promptly sold most of the SCM business units and the headquarters building in New York City for a significant profit.

Hanson's most significant single purchase was probably its takeover of Imperial Tobacco Group in 1986. Hanson paid £2.5 billion for the group then undertook a major reorganisation; divestitures netted £2.3 billion, leaving Hanson with the hugely profitable tobacco business for "next to nothing." Hanson sold off the food brand, Golden Wonder, to Dalgety plc in 1986. Hanson was also involved in the politically charged Westland affair of the mid-1980s, giving its backing to the successful British Government-backed bidder for the British aerospace firm Westland Helicopters.

In mid 1987, the firm acquired the American consumer products group Kidde at a cost of $1.7 billion; during October of that year, Black Monday hit and stock valuations plunged, leading to criticism that Hanson had allegedly overpaid for Kidde. In November 1988, Hanson bought Consolidated Gold Fields in exchange for £3.5 billion. The Gold Survey was taken on by a new company, now known as GFMS.

During mid 1991, the company attempted to acquire Imperial Chemical Industries (ICI), a business that was once viewed by many in Britain as the nation's leading company but was by then in decline. Hanson had acquired a 2.8 per cent stake in the company as part of its hostile takeover attempt, which ICI's management team chose to oppose. The envisioned acquisition became hotly contested and controversial, partially as it would have been the biggest takeover in British history at that point. In October 1991, Hanson opted not to proceed with the deal.

During September 1991, Hanson acquired Beazer, a major British housebuilder, in exchange for $609 million. Two years later, it also purchased a portion of the Watt Housing Corporation under a £116 million (£76 million) deal.

During the mid-1990s, conglomerates were falling out of favour with the investment community. Some of the manufacturing businesses were spun off as US Industries in February 1995. In January 1996, Hanson ended its time as a diversified conglomerate by breaking itself up into four separate listed companies: Hanson plc, Imperial Tobacco, The Energy Group and Millennium Chemicals. This restructuring had reportedly cost the group £95 million in professional fees by August 1996.

=== Building materials focus ===
During December 1997, Lord Hanson stepped down as chairman. Led by Andrew Dougal, chief executive from 1997 until 2002, the company focused on building materials. By December 1999, Hanson had become the world's biggest aggregates supplier and the second largest supplier of ready-mixed concrete. In November 1999, Hanson acquired Australian building materials business Pioneer International.

In early 2002, Dougal parted ways with Hanson, leaving with a controversially large pay-off (variously reported at between £400,000 and £660,000, plus a pension top-up of £636,700).

=== Acquisition by HeidelbergCement ===
In May 2007, HeidelbergCement announced its intent to purchase Hanson Plc for £11 per share, which valued it at approximately £8 billion. This deal made the combined company the second largest cement and building materials company in the world. The transaction was completed through Heidelberg subsidiary Lehigh UK on 22 August 2007. In December 2014, Heidelberg Cement agreed to sell its Hanson Building Products division to the private equity firm Lone Star for £900 million.

During 2023, Hanson was reportedly planning the construction of a new carbon capture facility that was aimed at reducing the emissions from their Padeswood cement works. The British government chose Hanson, along with other companies, to present progress plans for carbon reduction solutions.

In October 2023, the company announced that it was rebranding as Heidelberg Materials, as part as a branding rationalisation by its parent company.

== Operations ==
The principal markets of Heidelberg Materials UK are the major conurbations in England and Wales and the central belt of Scotland. The company supplies heavy building materials such as ready-mixed concrete, asphalt and cement to the UK construction industry.

== See also ==
- Hanson Cement
- Heidelberg Materials
- Hanson plc
- Mineral Products Association
- Ready-mix concrete
