= Herbert Druce =

English entomologist (1846–1913)

FLS Herbert Druce
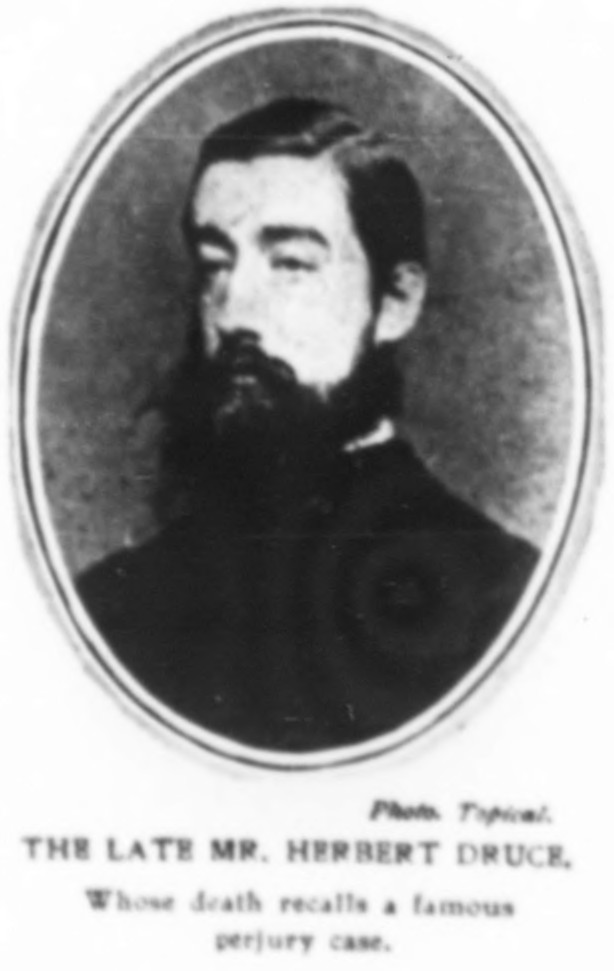
- Born: July 14, 1846; London
- Died: April 11, 1913 (aged 66); London
- Occupation: Entomologist

Herbert Druce, FLS (14 July 1846 in London – 11 April 1913 in London) was an English entomologist. His collections were acquired by Frederick DuCane Godman (1834–1919), Osbert Salvin (1835–1898), and James John Joicey (1870–1932) before being bequeathed to the Natural History Museum in London.

== Career ==
He operated The Baker Street Bazaar, or Druce & Co., after the death of his father Thomas Charles Druce in 1864.

He was an incidental participant in the Druce-Portland affair, in which his father was alleged to be the same person as John Bentinck, 5th Duke of Portland. He was accused of perjury for stating that he had witnessed his father's death. However, the case failed and he was vindicated.

== Family ==
He is not to be confused with his son, the English entomologist Hamilton Herbert Druce (1869 – 21 June 1922), who also worked on Lepidoptera.

== Death ==
He died on 11 April 1913 at his residence, The Beeches, Circus Road, St John's Wood, aged 66. He was buried on 14 April in a family vault at Highgate Cemetery.

== Partial list of publications ==
- Druce, H., 1872 with Arthur Gardiner Butler (1844–1925), Descriptions of new genera and species of Lepidoptera from Costa Rica. Cistula entomologica, 1 : 95–118. (1872)
- Druce, H., 1873. A list of the Collections of Diurnal Lepidoptera made by Mr. Lowe in Borneo. Proceedings of the Zoological Society of London 1873: 337–361, 2 pls. text plates.
- Druce, H., 1874. A list of the lepidopterous insects collected by Mr. L. Layard in Siam Proceedings of the Zoological Society of London1874(1): 102–109, pl. 16
- Druce, H. 1875 A list of the collection of diurnal lepidoptera made by Mr. J.J. Monteiro, in Angola, with descriptions of some new species. Proceedings of the Zoological Society of London 1875:406–417.
- Druce, H. 1887 Descriptions of some new species of Lepidoptera Heterocera, mostly from tropical Africa. - Proc. Zoological Society of London 1887:668–686, pl. 55
- Druce, H. 1894 Descriptions of some new species of Heterocera from Central America Ann. Mag. Nat. Hist. (6) 13 : 168-182
- Druce, H. 1894. Descriptions of new species of Agaristidae. - Annals and Magazine of Natural History (6)14:21–24.
- Druce, H. 1889 Descriptions of new Species of Lepidoptera, chiefly from Central America Ann. Mag. Nat. Hist. (6) 4 (19) : 77–94
- Druce, H. 1910a. Descriptions of some new species of Heterocera from tropical Africa. - Annals and Magazine of Natural History (8)5:393–402.
- Druce, H. 1911b. Descriptions of some new species of Heterocera, chiefly from tropical South America. - Annals and Magazine of Natural History (8)8:136–150
- Druce, H. 1912a. Descriptions of seven new species of Heterocera belonging to the subfamily Ophiusinae. - Annals and Magazine of Natural History (8)9:552–554.

== Sources ==
Translation from French Wikipedia.

Joicey, J. J.; Talbot, G., eds. (1924). The Bulletin of the Hill Museum: A Magazine of Lepidoptera. 1. London: John Bale, Sons and Danielsson Ltd. p. 3.
