= United Drapery Stores =

Former British retail group

United Drapery Stores (UDS)
- Type: Private
- Industry: Retail
- Founded: 1927
- Defunct: 1983
- Fate: Dormant company
- Successor: Hanson plc / Allders
- Headquarters: London, UK
- Key people: Sir Arthur Wheeler, 1st Baronet; Joseph Collier; Jack Lyons; Bernard Lyons
- Products: Retailers
- Subsidiaries: Allders; Richard Shops; John Collier; William Timpson; Whiteleys; Arding & Hobbs

United Drapery Stores, or UDS, was a British retail group that dominated the British high street from the 1950s to the early 1980s.

== Early history ==
In 1925, Charterhouse Bank set up Charterhouse Investment Trust. The trust started buying up department stores: Hinds & Co, John Blundell, Shinners, S. Young & Son and Hawes Brothers, as well as retailers Walker & Penistans and Joseph Carton and Co, in the London suburbs under the stewardship of Charterhouse chairman Sir Arthur Wheeler, 1st Baronet. In 1927, the trust floated United Drapery Stores as the holding company for these businesses. In 1928, Henry Glave, a department store in New Oxford Street acquired the business under the management of Sir Arthur Wheeler, 1st Baronet, who had recently resigned from Charterhouse. The company in 1930 reported profits of £102,413. By 1931, this had grown to 112 retail outlets, however Wheeler was declared bankrupt and Martin Price of Viney, Price and Goodyear were instructed to resolve the affairs of Henry Glave, with United Drapery Stores sold to help pay Wheeler's debts. It had transpired that funds from United Drapery Stores had been moved to M.I.G. Trust, a company used in connection with Wheeler's investments. The business was purchased by Eagle Star Insurance Company. In 1932, it acquired the business of Stewart's Clothiers Ltd, bringing its number of outlets to 232. Control of the John Anstiss group of drapery outlets and department stores, including Arding & Hobbs in Battersea and Owles & Beaumont, drapers in Brompton Road London, was secured in 1948. They purchased the Richard Shops chain of ladieswear stores in 1949 from Charles Clore for £800,000. A further thirty-seven shops were added to the business in 1950 when it took over the Scottish clothes chain Claude Alexander, while Reading department store Heelas was bought from Charles Clore, but sold three years later to the John Lewis Partnership. 1953 saw its biggest expansion through the acquisition of Prices Tailors Limited, a Leeds multiple tailoring firm. Prices had been founded in 1907 by Henry Price, and traded under the Fifty Shilling Tailors brand, with 404 stores and 12 factories across the country. After the takeover by UDS, the chain was gradually renamed John Collier.

== Later acquisitions ==
In 1954 UDS acquired Alexandre Limited, a Leeds-based multiple tailor with over 88 stores owned by Bernard and Jack Lyons and their families. Joseph Collier, the United Drapery Stores chairman, was struggling to turn around Prices Tailors and saw the Lyons as the men to turn it around. Bernard Lyons took control of the menswear operations and later became group chairman and chief executive, while Jack moved to London and took on a variety of group roles. A notable takeover by the UDS group came in 1958 when Joseph Collier negotiated a takeover of the Allders department store in Croydon, followed by Newcastle upon Tyne department store John Farnon. The Lyons would eventually start to rebrand United Drapery Stores department store businesses under the Allders name during the 1970s and 80s.

In 1959 the business failed in a takeover of rival department store group Harrods, rivalling Debenhams and eventual winner House of Fraser, after Joseph Collier sold the shares owned by United Drapery Stores to Hugh Fraser. UDS continued the policy of expansion through acquisitions, purchasing Cardiff department store Mackross and Alexander Sloan, an Irish clothing and household retailer in 1959, Portsmouth department store Landport Drapery Bazaar in 1960, credit drapers Lawsons and the Worldwide and Atlas Agency mail order businesses in 1965, with the twenty-seven shops of Brooks Brothers joining the forty-five stores of the Peter Pell clothing chain in 1967. It was reported that in 1966 alone UDS sold over 1,119,000 men's suits in Britain, making it one of the biggest clothing retailers in Britain at that time, rivalled only by the likes of Burtons and Hepworths.

Whiteleys of Bayswater, the now struggling giant department store, was purchased in 1961. In 1968, United Drapery Stores asked Joseph Kaplan from London and County Securities Group to manage the bank they inherited when purchasing Whiteleys, which saw branches opened in other department stores. The fur and leather retailer Swears and Wells was added to the business in 1969. The mail order catalogue business of John Myers was purchased in 1971, however they were beaten by Great Universal Stores to A & S Henry & Co group, owners of mail order catalogue John Noble in 1971. In 1972, UDS made an offer to purchase Debenhams, along with interest from Sears plc and Tesco, but were fought off by chairman Sir Anthony Burney. Although its bid for Debenhams failed, the company purchased Telstar Colour Television and footwear retailer John Farmer in 1972. In 1973, the business officially changed its name from United Drapery Stores to UDS and acquired the shoe repair business of Timpson for £28.6 million. However the company was dragged into the collapse of London and County Securities bank in the same year. In 1975 the company's subsidiaries were:

- Alexandre (menswear)
- Alexander Sloan, Dublin (clothing and household goods)
- John Blundell (department stores / credit drapers)
- Claude Alexander (menswear)
- John Collier Tailoring (menswear)
- The Household Supplies Co
- James Grant (furniture retailer)
- Lawsons (credit drapers)
- Ocean Trading Group (shipping company)
- Richard Shops (ladieswear)
- Masters Stores
- Swears and Wells (fur retailer)
- John Myers Group (mail order catalogue)
- Telstar Colour-vision (TV Rental)
- John Farmer (footwear retailer)
- William Timpson (footwear retailer)
- Grange (furniture retailer)
- Allders (department store)
- Arding & Hobbs (department store)
- John Banner (department store)
- John Farnon (department store)
- Gorringes (department store)
- Hawes Brothers (department store)
- Hinds (department store)
- Hurst & Sandler (department stores)
- Landports (department store)
- Lingards (department store)
- Mackross (department store)
- Medhursts (department store)
- James Page (department store)
- Shinners (department store)
- Whiteleys (department store)
- Youngs (department store)

== Final days ==
However, for the UDS menswear business the main rival was the Burton Group, and there were several attempts by UDS to take over Burton's, most notably in 1967. This attempt was blocked by the British Government's Monopolies and Mergers Commission as being against the public interest. At this time UDS had £24.5 million of sales, compared to Burton's £47 million, and 584 menswear stores including:

- 51 Brook Brothers
- 52 Peter Pell
- 25 Claude Alexander

However, by 1980, the business was starting to struggle with the growing diversification of the business, large amounts of borrowing, high interest rates and inflation and falling sales. The Alexandre and Claude Alexander stores were rebranded under the John Collier chain, with a loss of 100 stores and 500 jobs. The credit operations were sold to Citibank, John Myers was sold to Great Universal Stores while plans were made to sell John Collier to Burtons, although a management buyout was attempted but rebuffed.

In 1983 the group was acquired after a takeover battle by Hanson Trust, beating Gerald Ronson's Heron International with a bid of £264 million and was largely broken up. John Collier was sold to the management in a £47.5 million buyout in September 1983, (before being sold onto the Burton Group in 1985). Richard Shops was sold to Sir Terence Conran's Habitat Mothercare Group plc after a failed management buyout. Along with the sales of William Timpson and Orbit, the total return of £152 million was raised.
