= Jack Cotton =

Jack Cotton (1 January 1903 – 21 March 1964) was a British property developer. He became the dominant figure in the world of property development in Britain. His methods of operation were a model for others involved in the property boom in the years following World War II.

Jack Cotton was born on 1 January 1903 in Birmingham, and was educated at King Edward VI Grammar School, Birmingham, and at Cheltenham College. He left school at the age of 18 to become an articled clerk in a firm of estate agents and surveyors. In 1924, he set up his own firm in Birmingham.

By the 1930s, he was buying farmland to sell to speculative builders of housing estates. In 1932 he began the first of his purely urban developments, starting with blocks of flats and moving on to commercial property. In 1937, he built King Edward House on the site of his old school, which was rebuilt in Edgbaston close to the University of Birmingham. Other office blocks in the centre of Birmingham followed.

During World War II, he realised that there would be a huge demand for new buildings after the war. He moved to London, and bought a property company called Mansion House Chambers Ltd., which he then merged with another company called Chesham House (Regent Street) Ltd., the name of which was changed in 1955 to City Centre Properties. He persuaded the Pearl and the Legal & General insurance companies to become partners in his ventures. Barclays Bank joined in his overseas operations. In October 1960, City Centre Properties merged with Charles Clore's City and Central Investments to create one of the biggest property companies in the world. A year later, the group merged with Walter Flack's Murrayfield Real Estate Company, after previously owning one-third.

Cotton clashed with Clore and others and resigned as chairman in July 1963 following medical advice. He sold his shares for £8.5 million in November 1963 to Sir Isaac Wolfson, the chairman of Great Universal Stores and merchant bank Philp Hill, Higginson, Erlangers and became president but severed links with the group in February 1964.

The most important of Cotton's developments were the Big Top 3.5-acre site in Birmingham, the Notting Hill complex in London, and the Pan Am Building over the Grand Central Terminal in New York City.

Cotton was, like his father and grandfather, a prominent member of the Jewish community in Birmingham. He was vice-president and treasurer of its main synagogue (of which his grandfather was president). He contributed to many charities. The Cotton Terraces of London Zoo are named in his memory. He also founded a chair of architecture and fine arts at the Hebrew University and chairs of biochemistry at the Royal College of Surgeons and the Weizmann Institute.

Cotton died of heart disease on 21 March 1964 in Nassau, Bahamas. His son Derek also became a property developer.
