= 1993 Bournemouth bombing =

Provisional IRA attack in Bournemouth, England

Coordinates: 50°43′N 001°52′W

- Part of the Troubles
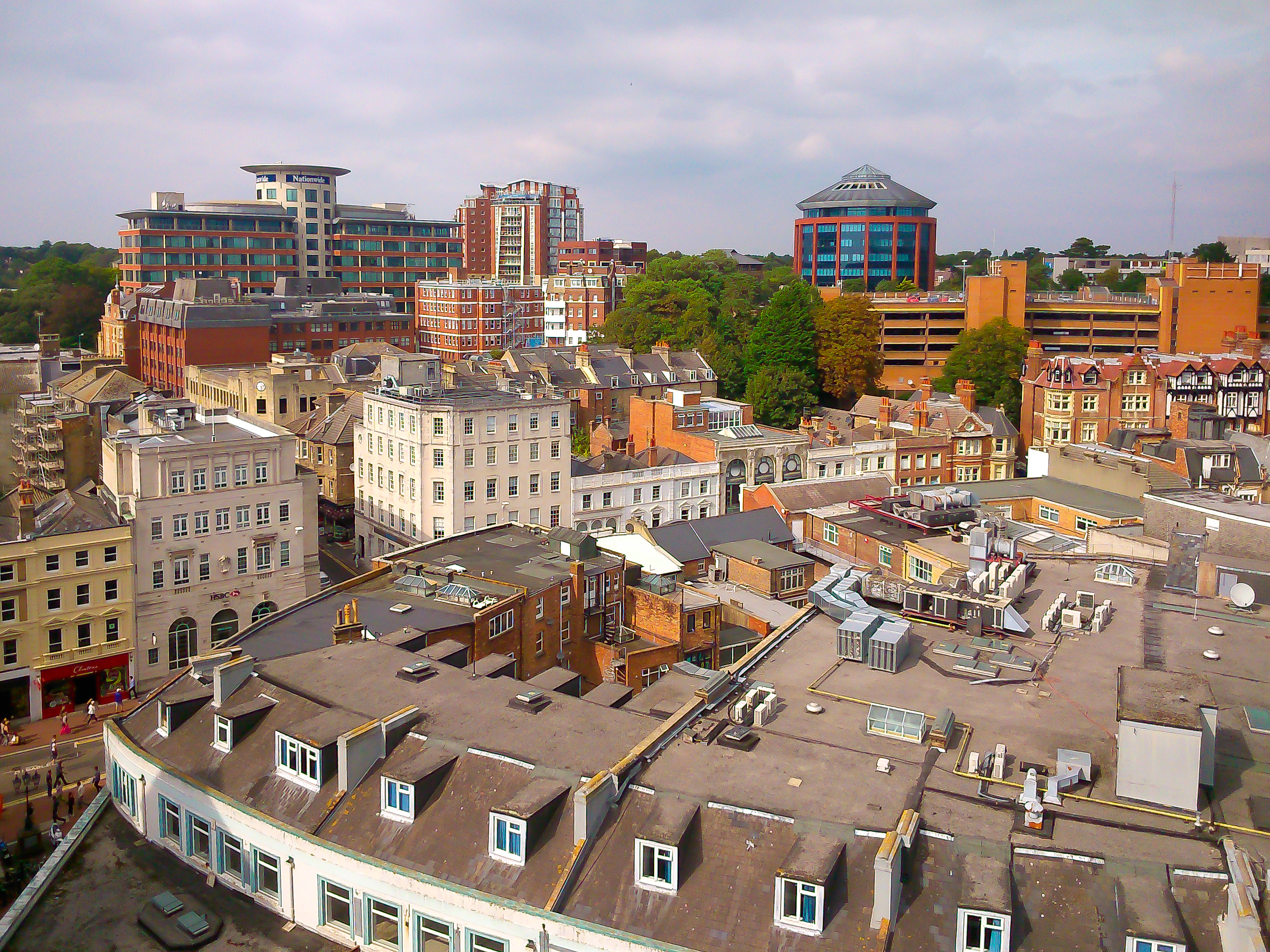
- Bournemouth Town Centre
- Location: Bournemouth, Dorset, United Kingdom
- Date: 13 August 1993; 03:00 GMT – 04:30 GMT (UTC)
- Target: Bournemouth
- Attack type: Bomb
- Deaths: 0
- Injuries: Unknown amount of minor injuries
- Perpetrator: Provisional Irish Republican Army
- No. of participants: Unknown
- Motive: The establishment of a republic, the end of British rule in Northern Ireland, and the reunification of Ireland
- Charges: 0

On Friday 13 August 1993, 6 out of 7 explosive devices planted by the Provisional Irish Republican Army (IRA), went off at locations within Bournemouth, Dorset, including shops and at the pier. Four devices were incendiary devices, whilst the other two were explosive devices. A larger explosive device, that was believed to have been able to destroy the pier, was located underneath the theatre on the pier and made safe by the British Army's bomb disposal team.

The bombings caused thousands of pounds worth of structural damage. There were no fatalities, but members of the public received minor injuries.

== Background ==
Nowhere in Dorset had been subject to a terrorist attack before. The incident was the first and only terrorist incident in both Bournemouth and Dorset. No warnings were given in relation to the devices. It was the first attack on mainland Britain since an attempt was made on a North Shields oil refinery and gas holder in Gateshead in June 1993.

== Bombs ==
=== Bomb types ===
The IRA's preferred weapon was the firebomb, with the devices timed to go off during the night, hoping that the emergency services will arrive after fires have started. This is why stores containing easily flammable items, such as soft furnishings and fabrics, are preferred targets. The first time that a firebomb was used in the England was in April 1991 at Preston railway station, where 20 were located within a holdall.

The IRA planted five incendiary devices, as well as two explosive devices.

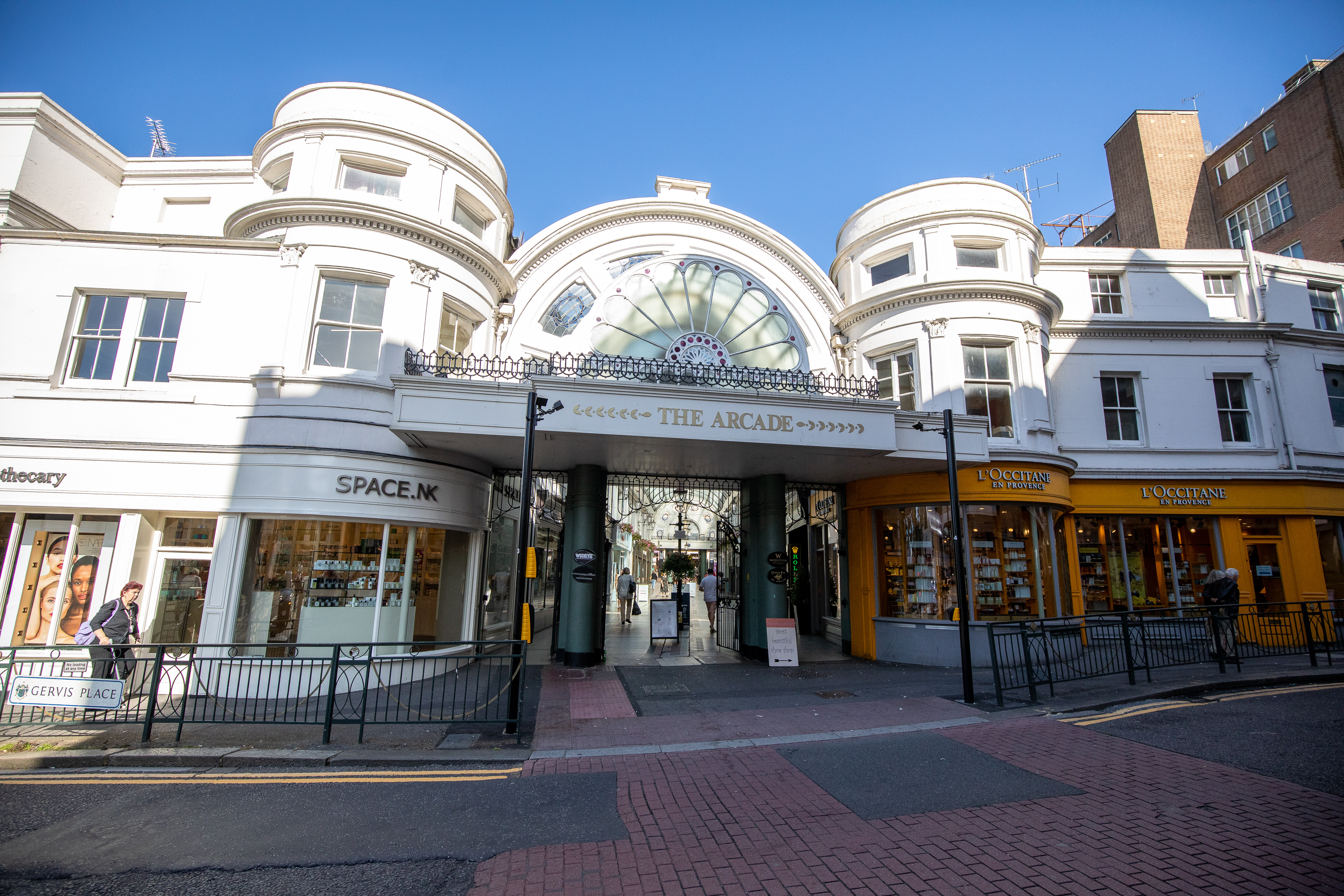
The Bournemouth Arcade, where devices detonated in two shops. A Waterstones is still located inside the Arcade today

=== Bombings ===
7 explosive devices were planted around the vicinity of Bournemouth town centre. The devices went off at intervals during the early hours of Friday 13 August, between 03:00 GMT and 04:30 GMT.

Two firebombs exploded in the basement of Maples furniture store, causing the most significant damage out of all the devices.

Another incendiary device exploded in the Tracks clothing store, with another incendiary device exploding in the Waterstones book shop within the Bournemouth Arcade, an arcade dating back to 1866 that connects Old Christchurch Road and Gervis Place.

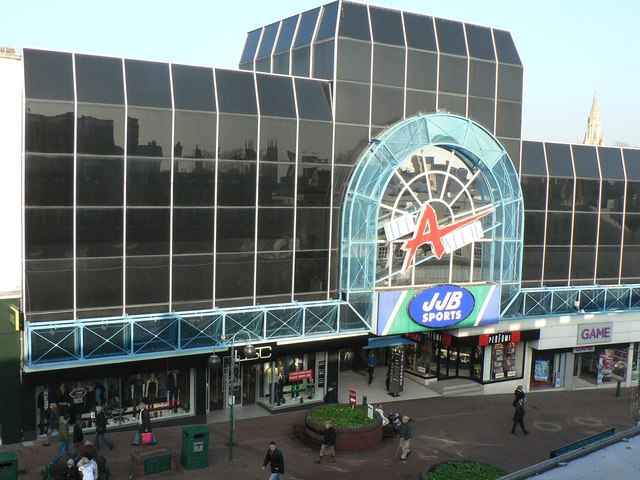
The Avenue Shopping Arcade

Another incendiary device exploded in Renate's clothing store inside The Avenue shopping centre, located on Commercial Road.

At approximately 04:30 GMT, an explosive device, that had been placed amongst a group of deckchairs on Bournemouth Pier, detonated, causing substantial damage to the west side of the pier.

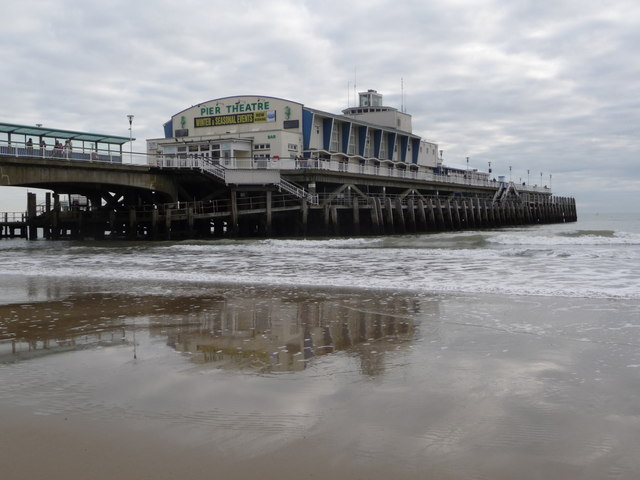
The theatre on Bournemouth Pier

=== Unexploded device located ===
At approximately 09:00 GMT, police discovered an unexploded device under the pier theatre. An army bomb disposal team made the device safe. It was thought the device was strong enough that it could have destroyed the pier and was described as 'substantial'.At the time, the device was under the theatre on the pier, Marc Camoletti's play Don't Dress for Dinner, was being performed, with 800 people in attendance. The performance featured Les Dennis, Lionel Blair, Vicki Michelle, Mandy Perryment and Su Pollard. The cast later joked about their 'explosive' performance that night.

== Investigation ==
Following the Bournemouth attacks, a section of Brighton seafront was sealed off on Thursday 12.The Palace Pier and local branches of Maples and Waterstones were sealed off.

Then Assistant Chief Constable for Dorset Police, Alan Rose, urged vigilance to holidaymakers and residents:

"This is the first time Dorset has had a terrorist incident of this nature and so people have really got to be on their guard. While they're in the stores and the shops in the town centre, although they will have been searched, clearly if you see anything that looks like a video tape, about the size of a video tape and possibly, in some instances, wrapped in blue denim material, then for goodness sake, dial 999 straight away"

— Dorset Police Assistant Chief Constable, Alan Rose, Speaking to 2CRFM (now Heart Dorset & New Forest)

It was believed that the devices in the shops were to be a distraction from the main target of Bournemouth Pier.

Despite hours of video footage and public appeals to find the people of interest, no suspects were ever located.

Dorset Police believed that the attacks in Bournemouth were meant to be part of a larger campaign against seaside towns that was foiled in June 1985.

The IRA later claimed responsibility and confirmed that this device underneath the theatre on the pier did not detonate due to a technical fault.

== Aftermath ==
Thousands of pounds worth of damage was caused to all the stores.

The week after it was attacked, the Maples & Co furniture store on St Peters Road reopened for a clearance sale. The store later went into liquidation in 1997.
