= Waring & Gillow =

British furniture manufacturer

- Trade name: Waring and Gillow; Waring and Gillow Ltd
- Formerly: Gillows of Lancaster; S.J Waring & Sons
- Industry: Furniture manufacturing
- Founded: 1897
- Headquarters: London, United Kingdom

Waring & Gillow (also written as Waring and Gillow) was a noted firm of English furniture manufacturers and antique dealers formed in 1897 by the merger of Gillows of Lancaster and London and Waring of Liverpool.

== Background ==
=== Gillow & Co. ===
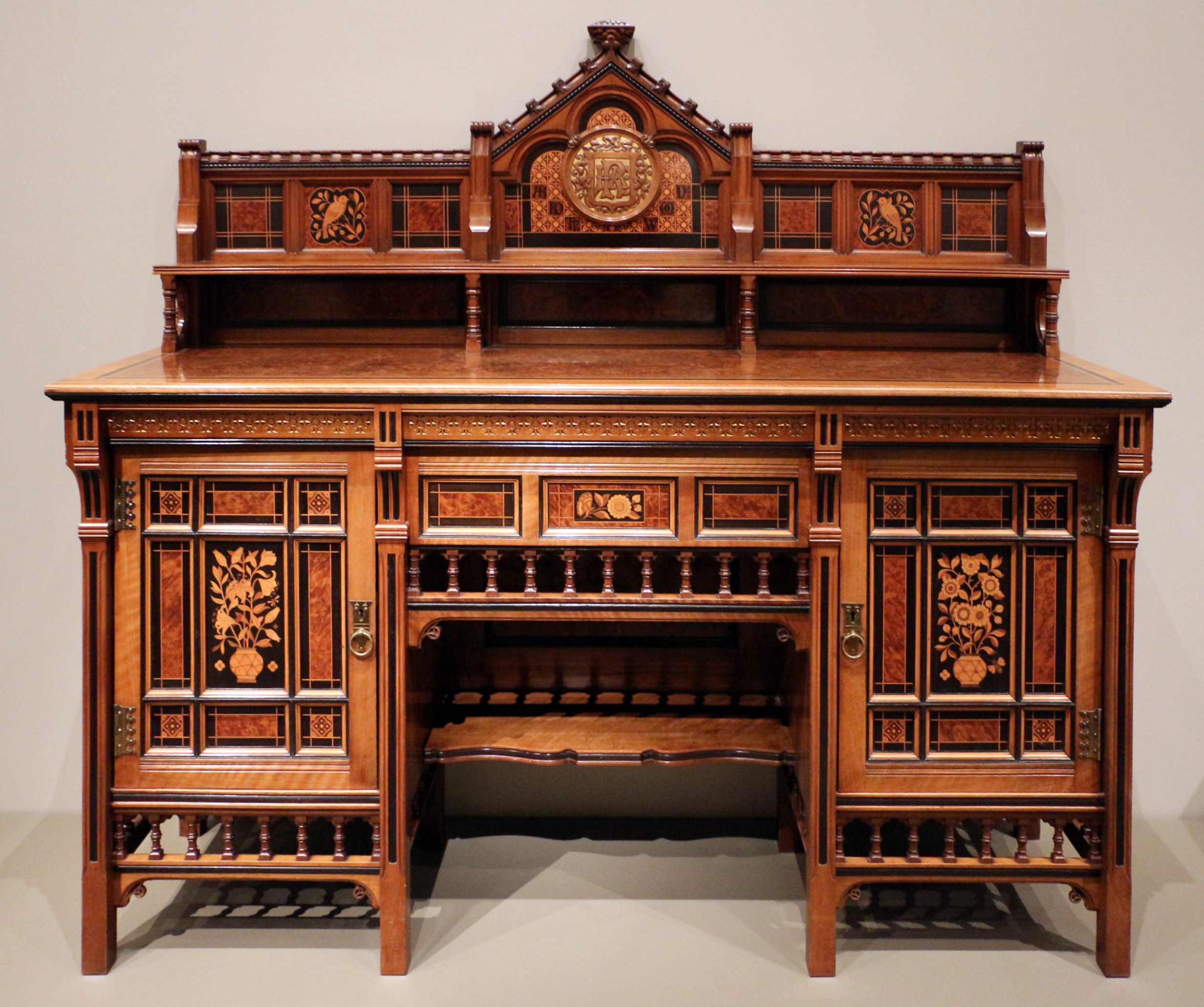
Drawing-Room Cabinet, 1871–72, designed by Bruce James Talbert, made by Gillow & Co., various woods, gilding, lacquered brass

The firm of Gillow's of Lancaster can be traced back to the luxury furniture and furnishings firm founded by Robert Gillow (1704–72) in about 1730. Robert Gillow served an apprenticeship as a joiner. During the 1730s he began to exploit the lucrative West Indies trade exporting mahogany furniture and importing rum and sugar. Following his death in 1772, the business was continued by his two sons, Richard (1734–1811) and Robert (1745–93). In 1764 a London branch of Gillow's was established at 176 Oxford Road, now Oxford Street, by Thomas Gillow and William Taylor. The firm rapidly established a reputation for supplying high-quality furniture to the richest families in the country. Gillow & Co. introduced both the Davenport desk and patented a telescopic dining table yet contemporary critics still called the company's furniture "solid, well made, but unadventurous".

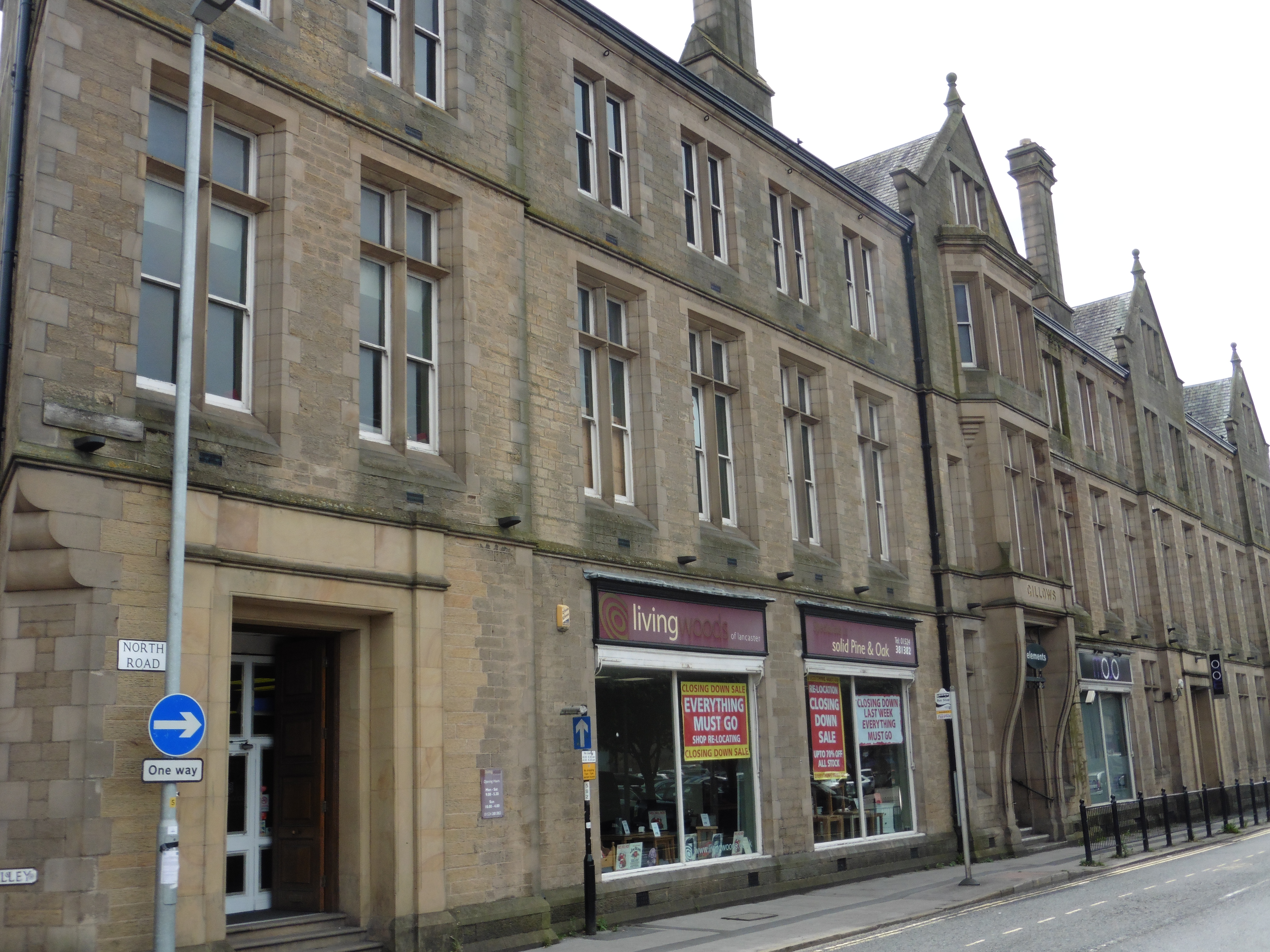
One of Waring & Gillow's former showrooms, Lancaster – A Grade II listed building

=== S. J. Waring & Sons ===
Waring's of Liverpool was founded by John Waring, who arrived in the city from Belfast in 1835 and established a wholesale cabinet making business. He was succeeded by his son Samuel James Waring who rapidly expanded the business during the 1880s, furnishing hotels and public buildings throughout Europe. In 1904, he founded the Waring-White Building Company which built the Liverpool Cotton Exchange Building, Selfridges department store and the Ritz Hotel. Samuel James's son and namesake Samuel James Waring (1860–1940) continued the family business and was elevated to the peerage as Baron Waring in 1922.

== History ==
=== Waring & Gillow ===
During the final years of the 19th century Gillow & Co. ran into financial difficulty and from 1897 began a loose financial arrangement with Waring of Liverpool, an arrangement legally ratified by the establishment of Waring & Gillow in 1903. The merger was complex and involved the purchase of cabinetmakers Collinson and Lock and carpet dealers T.J Bonter and Company. The firms combined with a capital of £1 million.

On 10 July 1897 The Times published news of the acquisition. The companies continued to use their own labels and stamps on their furniture even after the merger. The Lancaster factory continued to use the historic name Gillows & Co. and stamped work with the 'Gillows' stamp. Some pieces were affixed with a 'S.J Waring & Sons' label and others 'Waring & Gillow'.

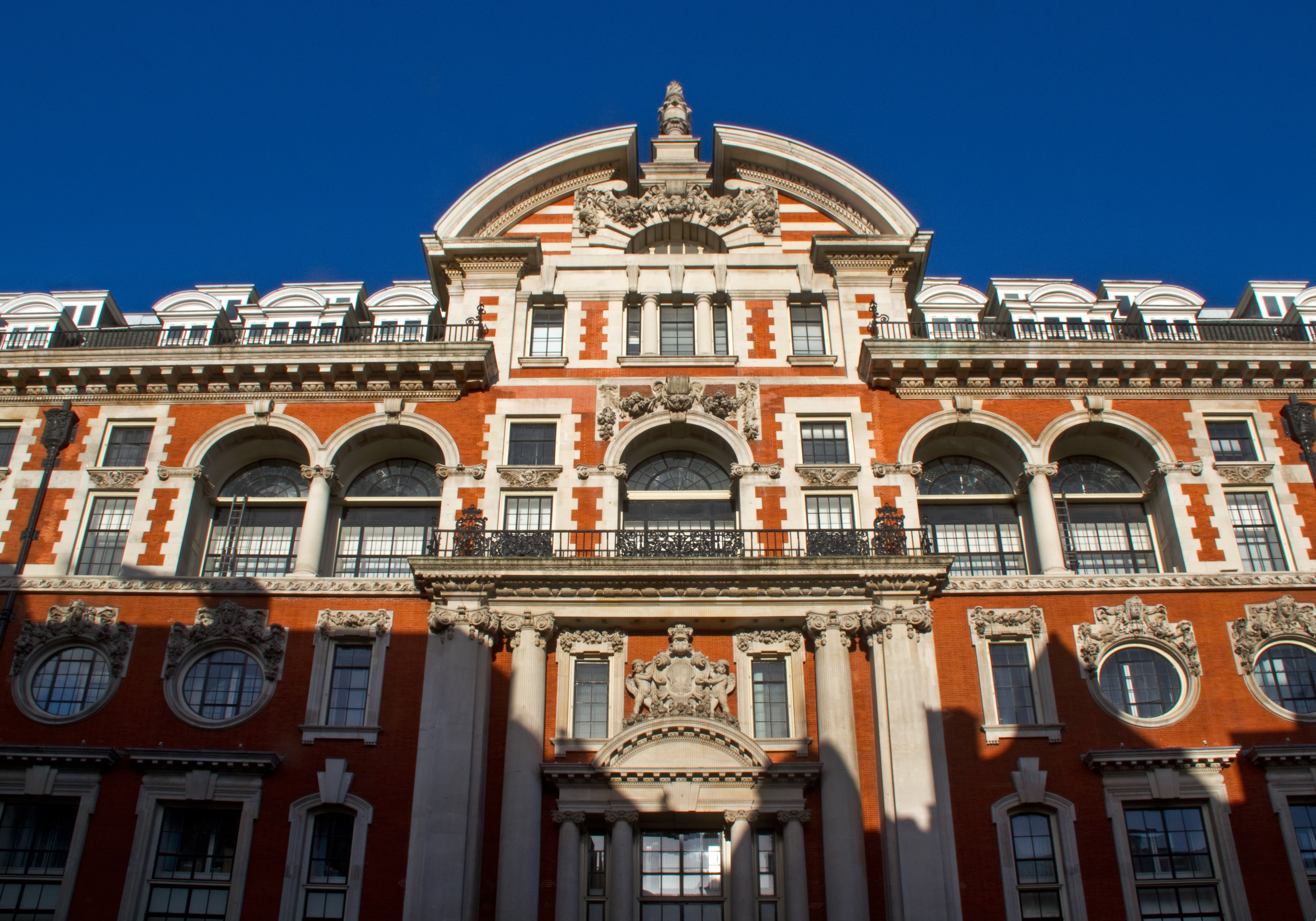
Waring & Gillow's Oxford Street store, which it occupied until 1973.

A new Waring & Gillow building was opened in 1906 on Oxford Street and signalled a true integration of both companies. The inauguration event took place from 11 to 16 June 1906. The Brotherton Library Special Collections archive at Leeds University houses the John Evan Bedford Library of Furniture History. This collection, collected by antiques dealer John Bedford, contains a ticket from the inaugural Waring & Gillow event (below right). The ticket shows that there had been music and entertainment during the evening as well as demonstrating the general grandeur of the affair, with separate entrances for guests using carriages.

A contemporary newspaper stated the impressive new premises covered 40,000 ft^{2} (3,700 m^{2}) and included a domed Georgian Rotunda (also mentioned on the reverse of the ticket) which measured 85 ft × 54 ft (26 m × 16 m). This building would remain the company's headquarters for the next 65 years.

Throughout their history, Waring & Gillow secured contracts for a number of luxury yachts and liners. These included the interior fittings of HM Alberta (1901) after Queen Victoria's death, the royal steam yacht Victoria and Albert III, the interior of the Princesse Alice (1895) for Prince Albert of Monaco, the Lysistrata (1901) for James Gordon Bennett, the P&O liner Viceroy of India (1929), and RMS Queen Mary (1936).

Like other prestigious furniture retailers of the Victorian era, Waring & Gillow also secured furnishing contracts for a number of new luxury hotels that were being constructed in the capital. These included the Carlton Hotel, the Waldorf and the Ritz.

The company designed the interior of the Helsinki Bourse Club in the 1910s.

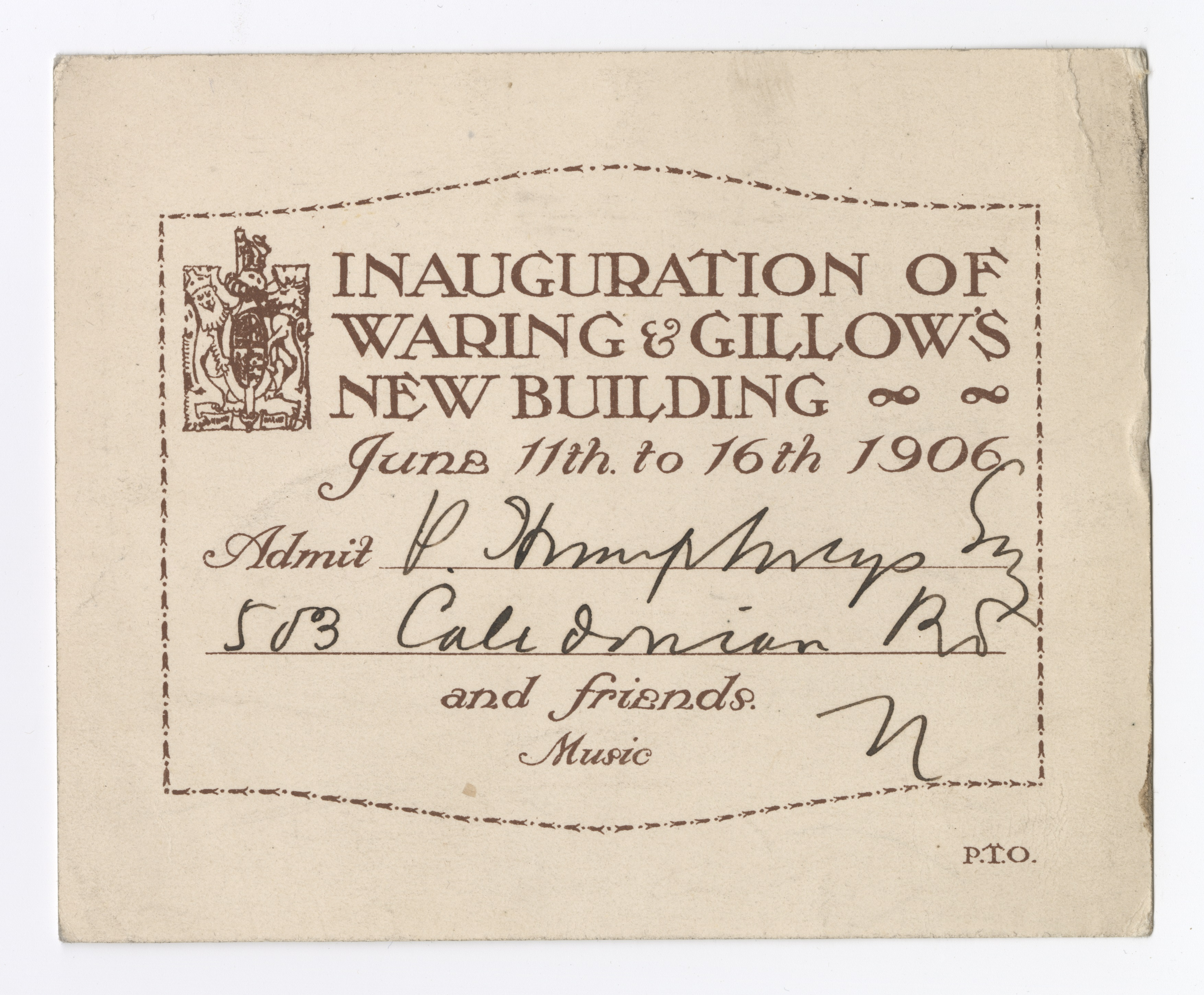
Ticket from the inauguration event of Waring & Gillow's new building in Oxford Street (1906)

=== 1900 Great Exhibition ===
In 1900 Waring & Gillow were tasked with the decoration of the British pavilion of the Paris Exhibition which was being overseen by British architect Edwin Lutyens. The success of their presentation cemented professional relationships with makers and clients around the world in addition to new workshops in Paris.

=== First World War ===
During the First World War the Lancaster factory was turned over to war production, making ammunition chests for the Navy and propellers for De Havilland DH9 aircraft. They also established a large tent-manufacturing facility of 8,000 workers on the now closed former exhibition site at White City (the former Machinery Hall), London.

From a manufacturing base in Cambridge Row workers made tents, gas masks for horses and aircraft wings. The company also manufactured ammunition belts for use with machine guns, nosebags for horses and protective clothing for use during gas attacks.

It still provided their services during the conflict, being in charge of decorating the majority of the interiors of the Ortíz-Basualdo Palace in Buenos Aires, Argentina, property of Daniel Ortíz-Basualdo and his wife, Mercedes Zapiola-Eastman de Ortíz-Basualdo, between 1912-1918 (now the French Embassy in Buenos Aires).

=== 1920s ===
Towards the end of the 1920s Waring & Gillow opened a new, experimental modern art department and enlisted Russian designer Serge Chermayeff as director. Chermayeff partnered with French designer Paul Follot who was working as the head of Waring & Gillow in Paris. Together they attempted to bring a progressive Art Deco edge to the company and in 1928 they opened the large exhibition Modern Art in Decoration and Furnishing in London. It consisted of 68 decorated and furnished rooms situated on the 4th and 5th floors of the Oxford Street building. The exhibition ran from November 1928 to January 1929.

=== Decline and administration ===
In the 1930s the Great Depression combined with Lord Waring spending outside his means during the previous decade caused financial problems for the company and Waring was forced to resign as chairman in September 1930, though he remained as President. The first liquidation meeting occurred in 1932 and the company was restructured as Waring & Gillow (1932) Ltd.

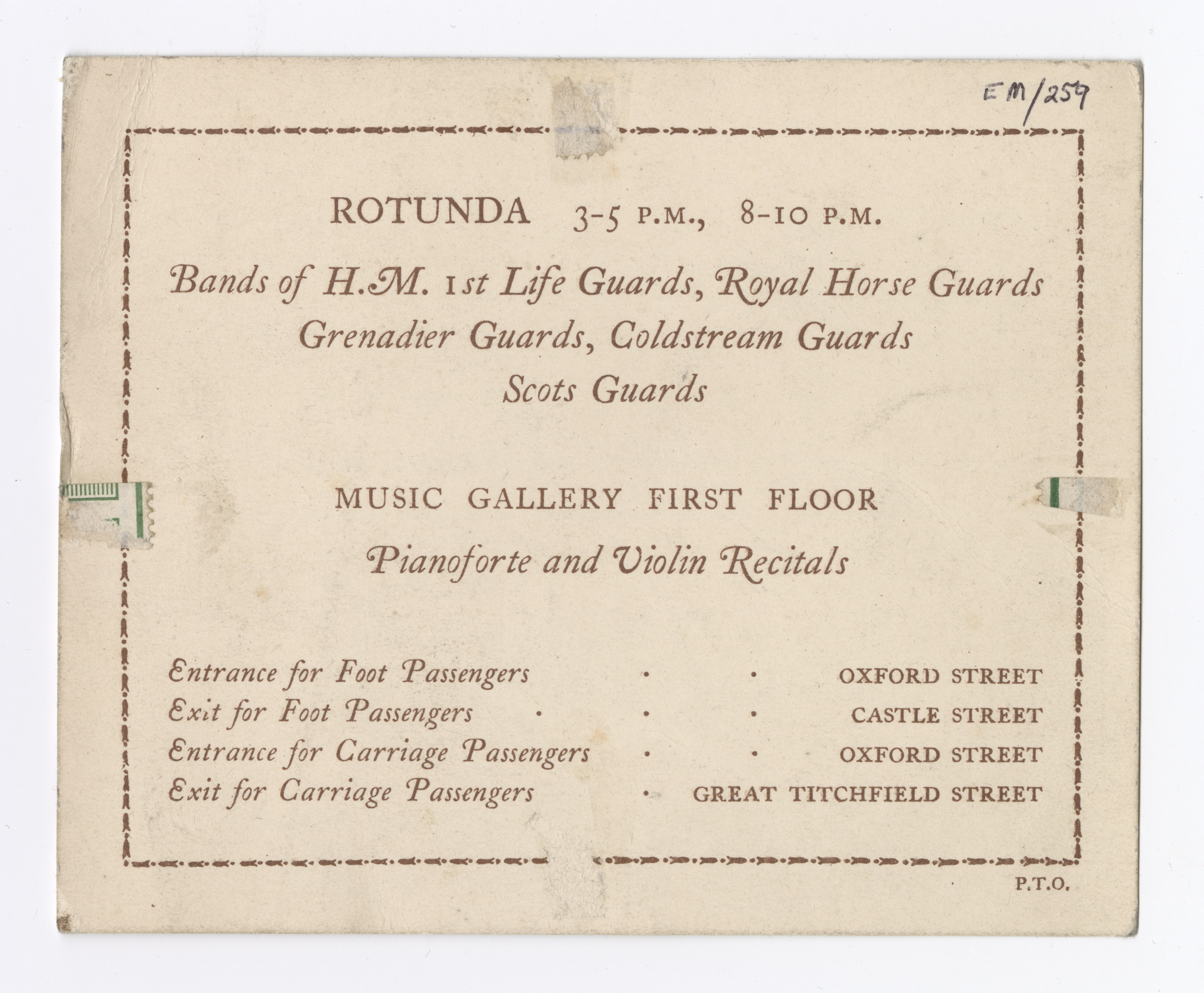
Reverse of the inauguration ticket

=== Second World War ===
During the Second World War the factory in Cambridge Grove, Hammersmith, produced parts for gliders and the Mosquito aircraft, while kit-bags, tents and camouflage nets were made by the upholstery department.

Waring died in 1940, in the early months of the war.

=== Post-War ===
The business was bought by retail conglomerate Great Universal Stores in 1953, however a large share of the business was sold to rival furniture chain "John Peters", run by Manny Cussins for cash and shares in 1960, with John Peters company renamed Waring and Gillow (Holdings) Ltd. After the war the business of the firm began to decline and the Lancaster workshops closed on 31 March 1962 to provide, two years later, the first home of the newly founded University of Lancaster. In 1980 Waring & Gillow approached rival furniture company Maple & Co. for discussions about a takeover. Initial offers were rejected by Maple directors but Waring & Gillow continued to buy shares of the company until eventually they had purchased 50.4% of ordinary shares which gave them control and in the process the company became Maple, Waring and Gillow. In 1988 Allied Carpets purchased 48 out of the 87 Gillows stores and the company subsequently became part of Allied Maples Group Ltd, which includes Allied Carpets.

== See also ==
- Joseph Gillow
- Maple & Co.
- Druce & Co.
- Cabinetry
- Upholstery
