= Stiff + Trevillion =

British architectural firm

Practice information
- Founders: Michael Stiff, Andrew Trevillion
- Founded: 1981
- Location: London, UK

Website
- www.stiffandtrevillion.com

Stiff + Trevillion is a London-based architectural practice founded in 1981 by Michael Stiff and Andrew Trevillion. By 2014, the firm had 40 staff members and had worked on over 2,000 projects. Designing both buildings and interiors their work covers the commercial, residential, restaurant and retail sectors, primarily in London but also across the UK and overseas. Some of their projects include the first Wagamama restaurant in 1992 and the first in the chain of Giraffe Restaurants. They have also designed various Italian restaurants for Jamie Oliver. Their residential clients have included Adele and Blur (band) and Gorillaz frontman Damon Albarn.

== Background ==
Michael Stiff and Andrew Trevillion were graduates when they founded Stiff + Trevillion in the spring of 1981. In 1991 Stiff and Trevillion designed the first Wagamama restaurant in Bloomsbury which opened in 1992. After Wagamama was finished the practice was asked to create a restaurant with a similar concept of Japanese dining called Satsuma. The dark-stained timber back wall and the black and white terrazzo floor reflected Japanese and Scandinavian influences.

Stiff and Trevillion have designed a few buildings abroad. One of their projects was designing Aspria Health Club in Hamburg. They collaborated with Colwyn Foulkes & Partners to fit out a large building. The architects created a two-storey enclosure within the space, the overall approach was to give a sense of arrival to a welcome hub, providing glimpses of the sporting activities on offer.

Stiff and Trevillion were chosen to design Jamie's Italian flagship restaurant in Bath. This subsequently led to the firm designing a Jamie's Italian in Guildford and in other cities across the UK.

Further work for clients has included Portobello Dock for Derwent London who acquired the site in 2004. Stiff and Trevillion were commissioned to refurbish the building on the north side of the canal and to revitalise the nineteenth century dock site with a mixture of restaurant, office and residential buildings. They completed the construction on the building in 2008.

In April 2010 the practice designed the office interiors for Innocent Drinks after winning the competitive creative pitch. In 2012 the practice designed the new interiors for the food and drink chain Eat (restaurant).

The practice won a competition in early 2010 to design and implement the new concept of the Metropolitan Costa Coffee. The aim was to refresh the brand image through interior design, emphasising the use of the existing elements such as exposed brick walls and ceilings coupled with concrete flooring and statement lighting.

The architect's completed Sloane Street for the Cadogan Estate in 2016. Stiff and Trevillion have designed 5,500sq m of retail space across the ground floor. The other five floors are office spaces.

== Awards ==
- Shortlisted for the RIBA South Regional 2013 Awards
- Office Architect of The Year 2013
- Restaurant or Bar in a Retail Space Winner 2013 Restaurant & Bar Design Awards (The Corner, Selfridges)
- New London Awards 2013 (Queens Building)
- Time Out Runners up of Restaurant Design of The Year 2008 (Le Cafe Anglais)
- RBKC Conservation and Design Best New Building Award 2008
- Winner RIBA London Award 2015, Queens
- Civic Trust Awards Regional Finalist 2016, Queens
- WAF Finalist 2015 Queens, 131 Sloane Street 2016 Portobello 2017
- BCO London and National Award winner, 20 Eastbourne Terrace 2017
