= Sir Arthur Wheeler, 1st Baronet =

English stockbroker and financier

Sir Arthur Wheeler Bt JP DL
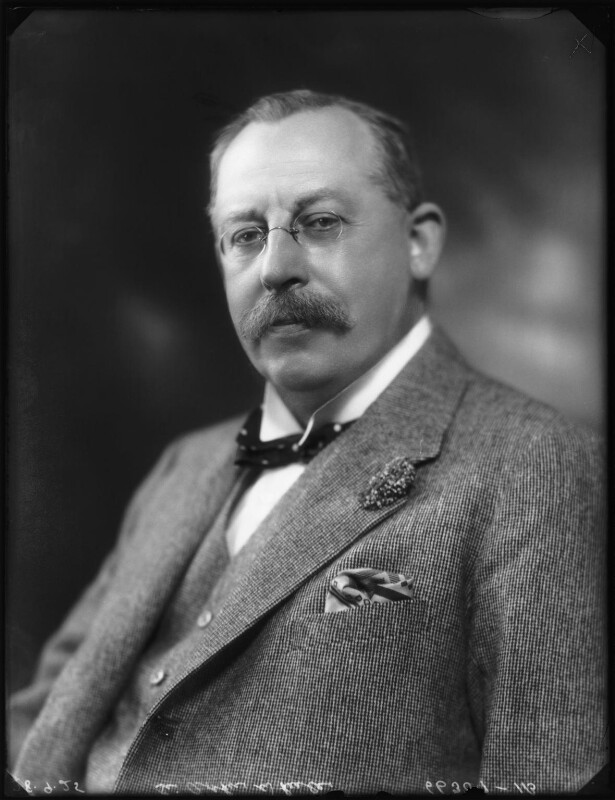
- Wheeler in 1925
- Born: 18 September 1860; Nottingham, England
- Died: 20 May 1943 (aged 82)
- Occupation(s): Stockbroker, financier

Sir Arthur Wheeler, 1st Baronet (18 September 1860 – 20 May 1943) was an English stockbroker and financier.

Wheeler was born in Nottingham. He was educated at Nottingham High School and joined Simon, Meyer & Co, a lace exporter, as a clerk. He rose to be chief clerk and in 1899 launched his own stockbroking firm in Leicester, concentrating on serving Midlands firms which were too small to launch themselves in the City of London.

During the First World War, Wheeler dedicated his energies to selling war bonds, and for this he was created a baronet in the 1920 New Year Honours. He was also sometime Justice of the Peace and Deputy-Lieutenant of Leicestershire.

He was ruined by the Depression, was declared bankrupt, and in 1931 was jailed for twelve months for fraud. After his release he retired from business.

== Footnotes ==
Baronetage of the United Kingdom
New title	Baronet (of Woodhouse Eaves); 1920–1943	Succeeded by Arthur Frederick Pullman Wheeler
