= John Collier (clothing retailer) =

Defunct British clothing retailer

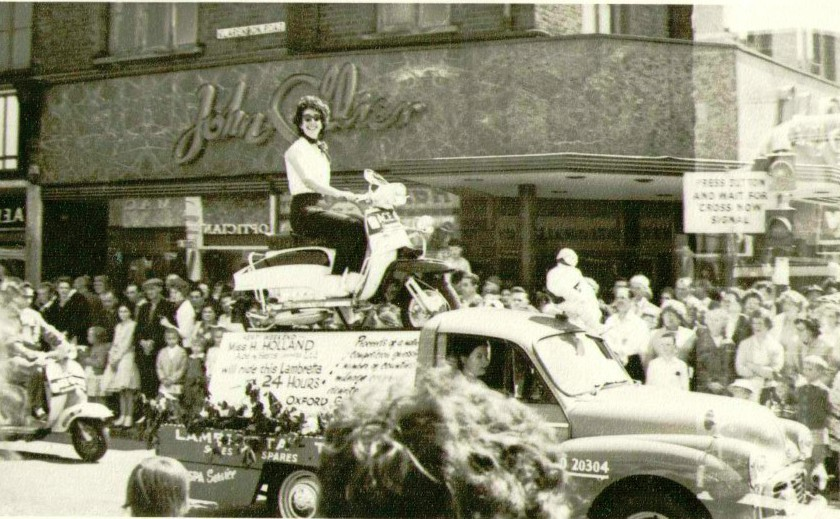
- John Collier store in the background, Watford, 1963
- Industry: Clothing retailer
- Founded: 1907
- Founder: Henry Price
- Defunct: 1980s
- Headquarters: Leeds, West Yorkshire, England
- Number of locations: More than 400 stores in the UK
- Area served: United Kingdom
- Products: Men's clothing

John Collier was a British chain of shops selling men's clothes.

Founded in Leeds, West Yorkshire in 1907 by Henry Price, the chain expanded to over 400 stores across the country, most of which traded under the Fifty Shilling Tailors brand.

In 1953, the company was sold to UDS, which renamed it John Collier. It continued to trade within the UDS empire until 1983 when UDS was sold to Hanson plc. In order to recoup the cost of the purchase Hanson sold on a number of UDS assets, including John Collier, for £47.5 million to a management buy-out team. In 1985 the company was sold on to the Burton Group, but the brand was discontinued and no longer exists today.

On 17 December 1975, the Prince of Wales visited for the formal opening of the head office extension. The huge complex in Kirkstall Road, Leeds, had two factories, No. 1 factory and No. 2 factory, in Evanston Avenue. This is now occupied by the Cardigan Fields Leisure and Entertainment complex. There were other factories in Westland Road, Leeds; Powlett Road, Hartlepool; Middlesbrough, South Shields and Peterlee. One by one they closed, leaving only Hartlepool and Middlesbrough by the late 1970s. The last factory to remain open was Hartlepool, after the closure of the Middlesbrough factory.

The advertising tagline, used in a number of variations over the years, was "John Collier – The Window to Watch".
