= McLeish =

McLeish is a surname. Notable people with the surname include:

- Adam McLeish, British sportsman in Snowboarding
- Alex McLeish (born 1959), Scottish former professional football player and manager
- Archibald McLeish (1892–1982), American poet, writer, and the Librarian of Congress
- Cindy McLeish (born 1962), Australian politician, member for Seymour in the Victorian Legislative Assembly since 2010
- David McLeish (Australian footballer) (born 1950), former Australian rules footballer
- Henry McLeish (born 1948), Scottish Labour Party politician, author and academic
- Hugh McLeish (1948–2004), Scottish former professional footballer
- Iona McLeish, London Theatre Award-winning British theatre designer and author
- Sue McLeish (born 1954), retired field hockey player from New Zealand

== See also ==
- McLeish Executive or Government of the 1st Scottish Parliament, formed following the 1999 election
- MacLeish (disambiguation)
- McLish
