= MacLeish =

MacLeish is a Scottish surname and may refer to:

== People ==
- Andrew MacLeish (1838–1928), Scottish-American merchant; father of Archibald MacLeish
- Archibald MacLeish (1892–1982), American poet, writer, and Librarian of Congress; Pulitzer Prize winner
- Kenneth MacLeish (1894–1918), American naval aviator; Navy Cross winner
- Rick MacLeish (1950–2016), Canadian ice hockey player

== Other uses ==
- Peter MacLeish and Beth MacLeish, characters in the TV series, Designated Survivor
- USS MacLeish (DD-220), U.S. Navy Clemson-class destroyer 1920–1946

== See also ==
- McLeish (disambiguation)
