= Martha Hillard =

American educator (1856–1947)

Martha Hillard MacLeish (née Hillard; August 17, 1856 – December 19, 1947) was an American educator and community leader.

== Biography ==
Hillard was born in Hadlyme, Connecticut, daughter of Rev. Elias Brewster Hillard (Preston, Connecticut, September 6, 1825 - Farmington, Connecticut, March 1, 1895, bur. Plymouth, Connecticut) and wife Julia Whittlesey (January 24, 1835 - 1899).

She graduated from Vassar College, where she became an assistant professor of mathematics. Between 1884 and 1888 she served as the principal of Rockford Seminary and was influenced by the writings of Milicent Washburn Shinn. She formed the West Side branch of the Visiting Nurse Association in Chicago and was an early contributor to the school that later became the University of Chicago. She also served as a board member, vice-president, and president of the Women's American Baptist Foreign Mission Society of the West and, after its merger with another group, as vice-president for its home administration.

She married on August 2, 1888, as his third wife Andrew MacLeish and had two daughters and three sons, including Norman Hillard MacLeish (1890–1975), married to Lenore Adale McCall (1899–1981). Their son, Archibald became Librarian of Congress. Another son, Kenneth, was an officer in the United States Navy during World War I. A naval aviator, he received the Navy Cross posthumously for his combat actions.

She died in Chicago.

== Sources ==
- Addams, Jane. My friend, Julia Lathrop. Campaign-Urbana: University of Illinois Press, 2004. ISBN 0-252-07168-9
- James, Edward T. Notable American Women, 1607–1950 : A Biographical Dictionary. Cambridge. Publisher: Harvard University Press, 1971 ISBN 0-674-62734-2
- Lisle, Laurie. Westover: Giving Girls a Place of Their Own. Middletown: Wesleyan University Press, 2009. ISBN 0-8195-6886-4
