= Bruce Dern =

American actor (born 1936)

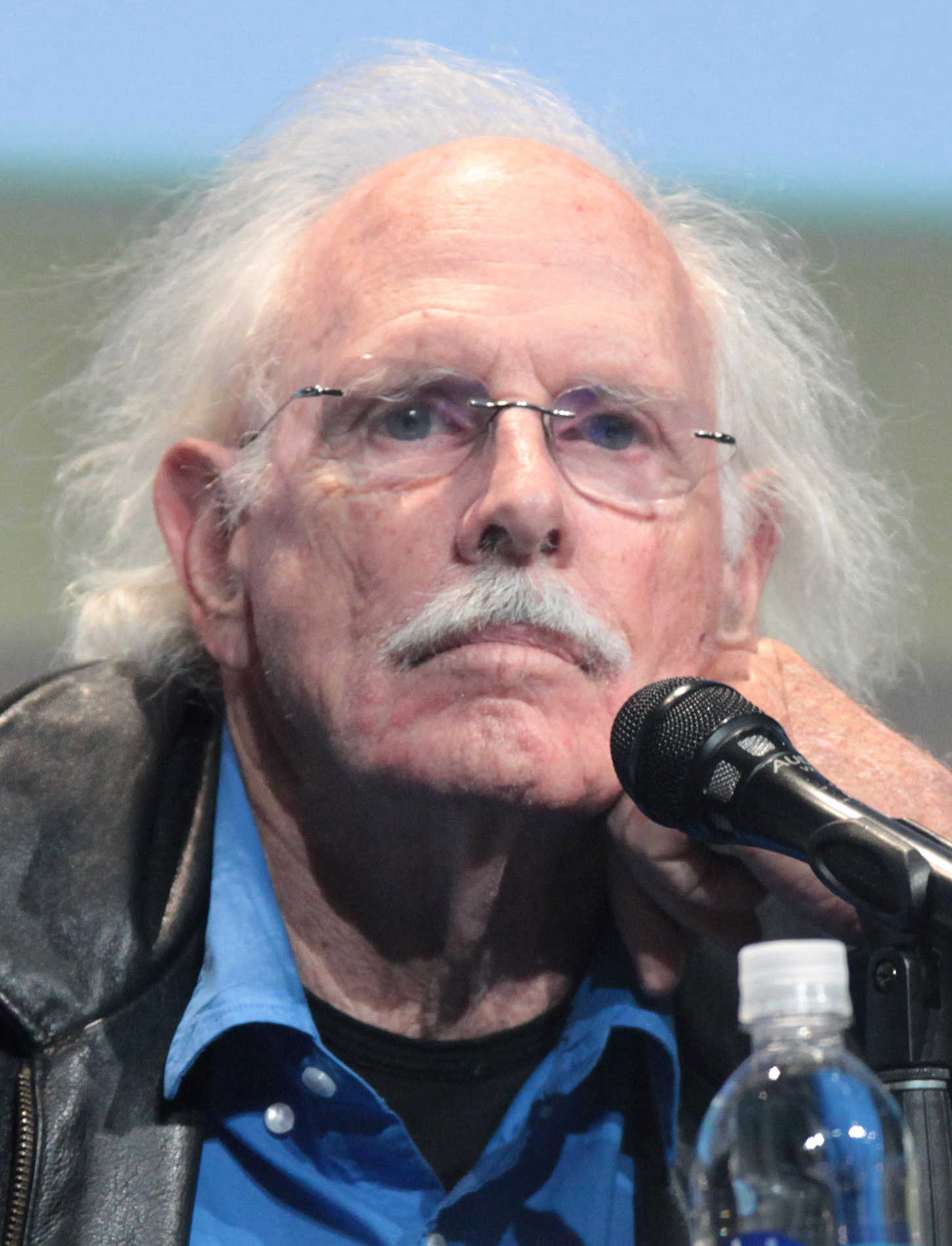
- Dern in 2015
- Born: Bruce MacLeish Dern; June 4, 1936 (age 90); Chicago, Illinois, U.S.
- Occupation: Actor
- Years active: 1960–present
- Spouses: Marie Dawn Pierce (m. 1957; div. 1959) Diane Ladd (m. 1960; div. 1969) Andrea Beckett (m. 1969)
- Children: 2, including Laura
- Relatives: George Dern (grandfather); Andrew MacLeish (great-grandfather); Archibald MacLeish (grand-uncle)

Bruce MacLeish Dern (born June 4, 1936) is an American actor. He has received several accolades, including the Cannes Film Festival Award for Best Actor for Nebraska (2013), which also earned him a nomination for the Academy Award for Best Actor, and won the Silver Bear for Best Actor for That Championship Season (1982). He was also Oscar nominated for the Academy Award for Best Supporting Actor for Coming Home (1978). He is also a BAFTA Award, two-time Genie Award, and three-time Golden Globe Award nominee.

A member of the Actors Studio, after portraying small roles in films like Marnie (1964) and Hush...Hush, Sweet Charlotte (1964), he rose to prominence during the New Hollywood era. His notable film credits The Trip (1967), They Shoot Horses, Don't They? (1969), The Cowboys (1972), Silent Running (1972), The Great Gatsby (1974), Family Plot (1976), Black Sunday (1977), The Driver (1978), Tattoo (1981), The 'Burbs (1989), Monster (2003), The Hateful Eight (2015), and Once Upon a Time in Hollywood (2019). He also starred in the HBO series Big Love (2006–2011).

He is the father of actress Laura Dern.

== Early life ==
Dern was born in Chicago on June 4, 1936, the son of Jean (née MacLeish; 1908–1972) and John Dern (1903–1958), a utility chief and attorney. He grew up in Kenilworth, Illinois. His paternal grandfather, George Dern, was a Utah governor and Secretary of War (he was serving in the latter position at the time of Bruce's birth). Dern's maternal grandfather was a Vice President of the Carson, Pirie and Scott stores, which were established by his own father, Scottish-born businessman Andrew MacLeish. Dern's maternal granduncles were poet Archibald MacLeish and Naval aviator Kenneth MacLeish. His godfather was governor and two-time presidential nominee Adlai Stevenson II. Dern graduated from New Trier High School, where he was a track star and sought to qualify for the Olympic Trials in 1956. Dern attended the University of Pennsylvania, but dropped out after two years. Dern studied alongside Elia Kazan and Lee Strasberg at the Actors Studio, New York City.

== Career ==
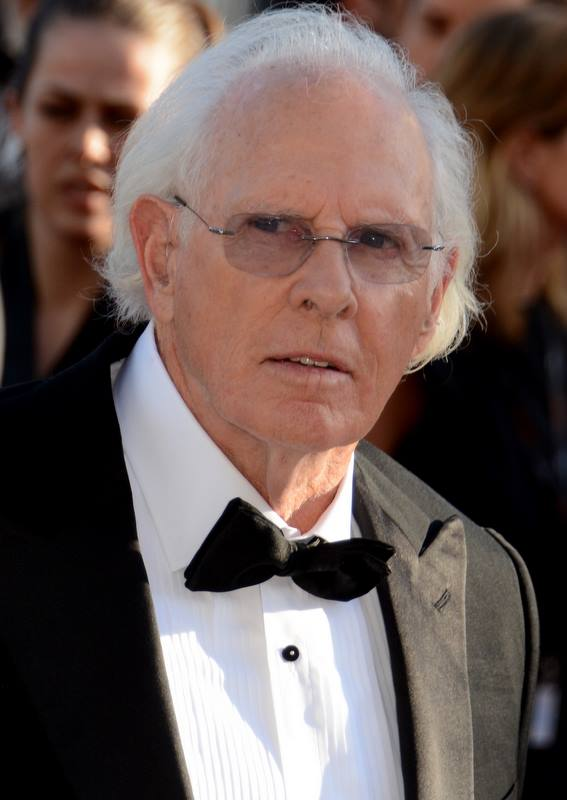
Dern at the 2013 Cannes Film Festival

Dern starred with Lyle Kessler in the Philadelphia premiere of Samuel Beckett's Waiting for Godot, and starred with Paul Newman and Geraldine Page in the original Broadway run of Tennessee Williams' Sweet Bird of Youth.

In the 1960s, Dern played the sailor in a few flashbacks in Marnie, and a murdered lover in Hush...Hush, Sweet Charlotte. He played a murderous rustler in Hang 'Em High, a gunfighter in Support Your Local Sheriff!, and an impoverished farmer in the film adaptation of Horace McCoy's novel They Shoot Horses, Don't They?.

In 1963, Dern starred in the episode "The Zanti Misfits" for the television series The Outer Limits.

In Mark Rydell's western film The Cowboys, he played a cattle thief who kills a rancher (John Wayne). Dern had a leading role in the ecological science-fiction film Silent Running, and co-starred with Jack Nicholson in The King of Marvin Gardens. Dern played Tom Buchanan in the film adaptation of F. Scott Fitzgerald's novel The Great Gatsby (1974). In Kirk Douglas' Revisionist Western film Posse, Dern played a train-robber who uses his wiles to turn the tables on his captor, an ambitious, politically minded marshal. Dern starred in the beauty pageant satire film Smile, and in Alfred Hitchcock's final film Family Plot. He played a detective on the trail of a getaway driver (Ryan O'Neal) in the neo-noir film The Driver. In John Frankenheimer's thriller film Black Sunday, Dern played a vengeful Vietnam War veteran and Goodyear Blimp pilot who launches a massive terrorist attack at the Super Bowl. Dern played another Vietnam veteran and the disturbed husband of a perplexed woman (Jane Fonda) in Hal Ashby's war film Coming Home, and was nominated for an Academy Award for Best Supporting Actor.

In Bob Brooks' erotic thriller film Tattoo, Dern played an increasingly-deranged tattoo artist who imprisons a fashion model (Maud Adams). The film was dogged by controversy throughout its post-production and pre-release phase - the film's release was delayed by nearly a year - and for his lead performance, Dern was nominated for the Golden Raspberry Award for Worst Actor. However, he bounced back by winning the Silver Bear for Best Actor at the 33rd Berlin International Film Festival for his performance in Jason Miller's That Championship Season (1982).

Over the next few decades, Dern played a Vietnam veteran and neighborhood survivalist in Joe Dante's suburban satire The 'Burbs, a local crime boss in Michael Ritchie's Diggstown, a rival of Wild Bill Hickok in Walter Hill's Wild Bill, and George Spahn in Quentin Tarantino's Once Upon a Time in Hollywood. Dern's autobiography, Things I've Said, But Probably Shouldn't Have: An Unrepentant Memoir, was published in 2007.

In Alexander Payne's film Nebraska, Dern played a resident believing he has won a million dollars, and undertakes a road trip from Billings, Montana to Lincoln, Nebraska to get the prize. He won the Best Actor Award at the 2013 Cannes Film Festival and was nominated for the Academy Award for Best Actor.

=== Directors and craft ===
In the course of his long and prolific career, Dern collaborated with film directors, including Walter Hill (The Driver, Wild Bill and Last Man Standing), Joe Dante (The 'Burbs, Small Soldiers and The Hole), and Quentin Tarantino (Django Unchained, The Hateful Eight and Once Upon a Time in Hollywood). In an interview for The A.V. Club, Dern said: "I always say that I feel like I've worked for six geniuses in my career... And the six directors, not in any order, would be Mr. Kazan, Mr. Hitchcock, Douglas Trumbull, Alexander Payne, Quentin Tarantino, and Francis Coppola." In an interview with Josh Olson and Joe Dante for the podcast series The Movies That Made Me, and while discussing his career, Dern cited the films of David Lean (specifically, Lawrence of Arabia, Great Expectations and The Bridge on the River Kwai), as among the films that inspired him. When asked if he has ever contemplated retirement, Dern said: "If you think I'm gonna retire so Jimmy fucking Caan can get another part from me, you're dead wrong. Because I'm gonna go till I'm 100. My goal is to do stuff with older characters that people never got the chance to do, because they never lived long enough... And because I don't have anything else I can do."

== Personal life ==
Dern was married to Marie Dawn Pierce from 1957 to 1959. He married Diane Ladd in 1960. Their first daughter died from head injuries after falling into a swimming pool in 1962 at 18 months old. The couple's second daughter is actress Laura Dern, born in 1967. After his divorce from Ladd, Dern married Andrea Beckett in 1969.

Dern has been an avid runner his whole life. In high school, he recorded a half-mile best time of 1:55.8, and he later was on the track team at the University of Pennsylvania. He said that between the ages of 28 and 70 he ran between 2,500 and 4,000 miles per year. In the 1986 film On the Edge, he played a runner seeking redemption in a contest based on the Dipsea Race, and the 1978 film Coming Home both begins and ends with scenes of Dern running. In a 2014 interview at age 77, he said he still ran nearly every day, albeit more slowly.

== Filmography ==
Key
†	Denotes works that have not yet been released

=== Film ===
Year	Title	Role	Notes
1960	Wild River	Jack Roper	Uncredited
1962	The Crimebusters	Joe Krajac	
1964	Marnie	Sailor	
1964	Hush...Hush, Sweet Charlotte	John Mayhew	
1966	The Wild Angels	Joe "Loser" Kearns	
1967	The War Wagon	Hammond	
1967	The St. Valentine's Day Massacre	John May	
1967	The Trip	John	
1967	Waterhole No. 3	Deputy Sam Tippen	
1967	Will Penny	Rafe Quint	
1968	Psych-Out	Steve Davis	
1968	Hang 'Em High	Miller	
1969	Support Your Local Sheriff!	Joe Danby	
1969	Castle Keep	Lt. Billy Byron Bix	
1969	Number One	Richie Fowler	
1969	The Cycle Savages	Keeg	
1969	They Shoot Horses, Don't They?	James Bates	
1970	Bloody Mama	Kevin Dirkman	
1970	The Rebel Rousers	J.J. Weston	
1971	The Incredible 2-Headed Transplant	Dr. Roger Girard	
1971	Drive, He Said	Coach Bullion	
1972	The Cowboys	Asa Watts (Long Hair)	
1972	Silent Running	Freeman Lowell	
1972	Thumb Tripping	Smitty	
1972	The King of Marvin Gardens	Jason Staebler	
1973	Pat Garrett and Billy the Kid	Deputy	Uncredited
1973	The Laughing Policeman	Leo Larsen	
1974	The Great Gatsby	Tom Buchanan	
1975	Posse	Jack Strawhorn	
1975	Smile	Big Bob Freelander	
1976	Family Plot	George Lumley	
1976	Won Ton Ton, the Dog Who Saved Hollywood	Grayson Potchuck	
1976	The Twist	William Brandels	
1977	Black Sunday	Michael Lander	
1978	Coming Home	Captain Bob Hyde	
1978	The Driver	The Detective	
1980	Middle Age Crazy	Bobby Lee Burnett	
1981	Tattoo	Karl Kinsky	
1982	That Championship Season	George Sitkowski	
1982	Harry Tracy, Desperado	Harry Tracy	
1986	On the Edge	Wes Holman	
1987	The Big Town	Mr. Edwards	
1987	World Gone Wild	Ethan	
1988	1969	Cliff Denny	
1989	The 'Burbs	Mark Rumsfield	
1990	After Dark, My Sweet	Garrett "Uncle Bud" Stoker	
1992	Diggstown	John Gillon	
1995	Wild Bill	Will Plummer	
1996	Down Periscope	Admiral Yancy Graham	
1996	Mulholland Falls	The Chief	Uncredited
1996	Last Man Standing	Sheriff Ed Galt	
1998	Small Soldiers	Link Static (Voice)	
1999	The Haunting	Mr. Dudley	
1999	If... Dog... Rabbit...	McGurdy	
2000	All the Pretty Horses	The Judge	
2001	The Glass House	Alvin Begleiter	
2003	Masked and Anonymous	Editor	
2003	Milwaukee, Minnesota	Sean McNally	
2003	Monster	Thomas	
2005	Madison	Harry Volpi	
2005	Down in the Valley	Charlie	
2006	Believe in Me	Ellis Brawley	
2006	Walker Payne	Chester	
2006	The Astronaut Farmer	Hal	
2006	The Hard Easy	Gene	
2007	The Cake Eaters	Easy Kimbrough	
2007	The Death and Life of Bobby Z	Hippy Narrator	Uncredited
2008	Swamp Devil	Howard Blame	
2008	The Golden Boys	Captain Perez Ryder	
2009	American Cowslip	Cliff	
2009	The Hole 3D	Creepy Carl	
2009	The Lightkeepers	Bennie	
2010	Trim	Dale Banks	
2011	Choose	Dr. Ronald Pendleton	
2011	Inside Out	Vic Small	
2011	Twixt	Bobby LaGrange	
2012	From Up on Poppy Hill	Yoshio Onodera (voice)	English dub
2012	Hitting the Cycle	James	
2012	Django Unchained	Curtis Carrucan	
2013	Coffin Baby	Vance Henrickson	
2013	Northern Borders	Austin Kittredge Sr.	
2013	Nebraska	Woody Grant	
2013	Fighting for Freedom	Christian Dobbe	
2014	Cut Bank	Georgie Wits	
2015	The Hateful Eight	General Sanford Smithers	
2017	American Violence	Richard Morton	
2017	Class Rank	Oswald Flannigan	
2017	The Lears	Davenport Lear	
2017	Hickok	Doc Rivers O'Roark	
2017	Our Souls at Night	Dorlan Becker	
2017	Chappaquiddick	Joseph P. Kennedy Sr.	
2018	Nostalgia	Ronnie Ashemore	
2018	White Boy Rick	Ray Wershe	
2018	Freaks	Alan/Mr. Snowcone	
2018	Warning Shot	Calvin	
2018	American Dresser	King	
2018	Lez Bomb	Grandpa	
2019	The Mustang	Myles	
2019	The Peanut Butter Falcon	Carl	
2019	Once Upon a Time in Hollywood	George Spahn	
2019	Remember Me	Claude	
2019	Swing Low (subsequently titled Ravage)	Mallinckroft	
2019	Inherit the Viper	Clay Carter	
2019	QT8: The First Eight	Himself	Documentary
2019	The Artist's Wife	Richard Smythson	
2019	Badland	Reginald Cooke	
2020	Emperor	Levi Coffin	
2020	Death in Texas	Reynolds	
2021	Last Call	Coach Finnegan	
2021	Buck Alamo	Death	
2021	Overrun	Arkadi Dubkova	
2021	The Gateway	Marcus	
2021	Hands That Bind	Hank	
2021	Christmas vs. the Walters	Cliff Walters	
2021	Last Shoot Out	Blair Callahan	
2022	The Hater	Frank	
2022	Hellblazers	Bill Unger	
2022	Mid-Century	Emil Larson	
2022	The Most Dangerous Game	Whitney Tyler	
2023	The Weapon	Doris	
2023	Butch Cassidy and the Wild Bunch	Mike Cassidy	
2023	Accidental Texan	Scheermeyer	
2023	Butch vs. Sundance	Mike Cassidy	
2023	Hunting Games	Henry	
2023	Old Dads	Richie Jacobs	
2024	Bloodline Killer	Dr. Lucien	
2024	The Devil's Trap	Mr. Cohen	
2025	The World's Happiest Man	Tom	
2025	Bad Men Must Bleed	George Wells	
2025	Fractured	Papa Joe	
2026	Dernsie: The Amazing Life of Bruce Dern	Himself	Documentary
TBA	Northbound †	Arthur	Post-production

=== Television ===
Year	Title	Role	Notes
1960	Route 66	Albert	Episode: "The Man on the Monkey Board"
1961	Naked City	Nicky	Episode: "Bullets Cost Too Much"
1961	Naked City	Hollis	Episode: "The Fault in Our Stars" (uncredited)
1961	Sea Hunt	FBI Agent John Furillo	Episode: "Crime at Sea"
1961	Surfside 6	Johnny Page	Episode: "Daphne, Girl Detective"
1961	Thriller	Johnny Norton	Episode: "The Remarkable Mrs. Hawk"
1961	Ben Casey	Billy Harris	Episode: "A Dark Night for Billy Harris"
1961	The Detectives	Jud Treadwell	Episode: "Act of God"
1961	Cain's Hundred	Joe Krajac	Episode: "Crime and Commitment: Part 1"
1962	Cain's Hundred	Eddie Light	Episode: "The Left Side of Canada"
1962	The Dick Powell Show	Deering	Episode: "Squadron"
1962–1963	Stoney Burke	E.J. Stocker	17 episodes
1963	The Dick Powell Show	Hank Fairbrother	Episode: "The Old Man and the City"
1963	Kraft Suspense Theatre	Maynard	Episode: "The Hunt"
1963	The Outer Limits	Ben Garth	Episode: "The Zanti Misfits"
1963	Wagon Train	Seth Bancroft	Episode: "The Eli Bancroft Story"
1963	The Fugitive	Deputy Martin	Episode: "The Other Side of the Mountain"
1964	The Virginian	Pell	Episode: "First to Thine Own Self"
1964	The Virginian	Lee Darrow	Episode: "The Payment"
1964	Wagon Train	Jud Fisher	Episode: "Those Who Stay Behind"
1964	The Fugitive	Charley	Episode: "Come Watch Me Die"
1964	77 Sunset Strip	Ralph Wheeler	Episode: "Lovers' Lane"
1964	The Greatest Show on Earth	Vernon	Episode: "The Last of the Strongmen"
1964	The Alfred Hitchcock Hour	Roy Bullock	Episode: "Night Caller"
1964	The Alfred Hitchcock Hour	Jesse	Episode: "Lonely Place"
1964	12 O'Clock High	Lieutenant Michaels	Episode: "Golden Boy Had Nine Black Sheep"
1965	12 O'Clock High	Lieutenant Danton	Episode: "The Lorelei"
1965	12 O'Clock High	Lieutenant Michaels	Episode: "The Mission"
1965	12 O'Clock High	Technical Sergeant Frank Jones	Episode: "The Jones Boys"
1965	The Virginian	Bert Kramer	Episode: "A Little Learning"
1965	Wagon Train	Wilkins	Episode: "The Indian Girl Story"
1965	The Fugitive	Cody	Episode: "Corner of Hell"
1965	The Fugitive	Hank	Episode: "The Good Guys and the Bad Guys"
1965	Rawhide	Ed Rankin	Episode: "Walk into Terror"
1965	Laredo	Joe Durkee	Episode: "Rendezvous at Arillo"
1965	A Man Called Shenandoah	Bobby Ballantine	Episode: "The Verdict"
1965	The F.B.I.	Private First Class Byron Landy	Episode: "Pound of Flesh"
1965	Gunsmoke	Doyle Phleger	Episode: "Ten Little Indians"
1965	Gunsmoke	Judd Print	Episode: "South Wind"
1966	Gunsmoke	Lou Stone	Episode: "The Jailer"
1966	The Fugitive	Hutch	Episode: "The Devil's Disciples"
1966	Branded	Les	Episode: "The Wolfers"
1966	The Loner	Lud Grant	Episode: "To Hang a Dead Man"
1966	Disneyland	Turk	Episode: "Gallegher Goes West: Crusading Reporter"
1966	Run for Your Life	Alex Ryder	Episode: "The Treasure Seekers"
1966	The Big Valley	Jack Follet	Episode: "Under a Dark Star"
1966	The Big Valley	Harry Dixon	Episode: "By Force and Violence"
1966	The Big Valley	Clovis	Episode: "The Lost Treasure"
1967	The Big Valley	Gabe Skeels	Episode: "Four Days to Furnace Hill"
1967	Run for Your Life	Alex Ryder	2 episodes
1968	Lancer	Lucas Thatcher	Episode: "Julie"
1968	The Big Valley	John Weaver	Episode: "The Prize"
1968	The F.B.I.	Virgil Roy Phipps	Episode: "The Nightmare"
1968	Bonanza	Cully Maco	Episode: "The Trackers"
1969	Lancer	Tom Nevill	Episode: "A Person Unknown"
1969	Gunsmoke	Guerin	Episode: "The Long Night"
1969	Then Came Bronson	Bucky O'Neill	Episode: "Amid Splinters of the Thunderbolt"
1970	Bonanza	Bayliss	Episode: "The Gold Mine"
1970	Land of the Giants	Thorg	Episode: "Wild Journey"
1970	The High Chaparral	Wade	Episode: "Only the Bad Come to Sonora"
1970	The Immortal	Luther Seacombe	Episode: "To the Gods Alone"
1985	Space	Stanley Mott	5 episodes
1985	Toughlove	Rob Charters	Television film
1987	Roses Are for the Rich	Douglas Osborne	Television film
1987	Uncle Tom's Cabin	Augustine St. Claire	Television film
1989	Trenchcoat in Paradise	John Hollander	Television film
1990	The Court-Martial of Jackie Robinson	Scout Ed Higgins	Television film
1991	Into the Badlands	T.L. Barston	Television film
1991	Carolina Skeletons	Junior Stoker	Television film
1993	It's Nothing Personal	Billy Archer	Television film
1994	Dead Man's Revenge	Payton McCay	Television film
1994	Amelia Earhart: The Final Flight	George Putnam	Television film
1995	A Mother's Prayer	John Walker	Television film
1995	Mrs. Munck	Patrick Leary	Television film
1999	Hard Time: The Premonition	Winston	Television film
2003	King of the Hill	Randy Strickland (voice)	Episode: "Boxing Luanne"
2003	Hard Ground	Nate Hutchinson	Television film
2006–2011	Big Love	Frank Harlow	29 episodes
2007	CSI: NY	Vet	Episode: "Boo"
2013	Pete's Christmas	Grandpa	Television film
2016	The Cowboy	Himself	Television documentary
2019	Black Monday	Rod "The Jammer" Jaminski	2 episodes
2019	Mr. Mercedes	John Rothstein	8 episodes
2021	Goliath	Frank Zax	8 episodes
2024	Palm Royale	Skeet Rollins	3 episodes

=== Video games ===
Year	Title	Role
2020	Shadow Stalkers	The Director
2020	MegaRace: DeathMatch	Rabies

== Awards and nominations ==
Year	Title	Award
1972	Drive, He Said	National Society of Film Critics Award for Best Supporting Actor
1973	The Cowboys	Bronze Wrangler for Best Theatrical Motion Picture
1975	The Great Gatsby	Nominated – Golden Globe Award for Best Supporting Actor – Motion Picture
1979	Coming Home	Nominated – Academy Award for Best Supporting Actor; Nominated – Golden Globe Award for Best Supporting Actor – Motion Picture
1983	That Championship Season	Silver Bear for Best Actor
2009	Swamp Devil	Philadelphia Film Festival Jury Prize
2014	Nebraska	AARP Annual Movies for Grownups Award for Best Actor; Boston Society of Film Critics Award for Best Cast; Cannes Film Festival Best Actor Award; Dublin Film Critics Circle Award for Best Actor; Los Angeles Film Critics Association Award for Best Actor; National Board of Review Award for Best Actor; Nominated – Academy Award for Best Actor; Nominated – Alliance of Women Film Journalists Award for Best Actor; Nominated – Alliance of Women Film Journalists Award for Best Ensemble Cast; Nominated – American Comedy Award for Comedy Actor – Film; Nominated – BAFTA Award for Best Actor in a Leading Role; Nominated – Broadcast Film Critics Association Award for Best Actor; Nominated – Broadcast Film Critics Association Award for Best Cast; Nominated – Central Ohio Film Critics Association Award for Best Ensemble; Nominated – Chicago Film Critics Association Award for Best Actor; Nominated – Dallas–Fort Worth Film Critics Association Award for Best Actor; Nominated – Gold Derby Award for Best Actor; Nominated – Golden Globe Award for Best Actor – Motion Picture Musical or Comedy; Nominated – Guardian Film Award for Best Actor; Nominated – Houston Film Critics Society Award for Best Actor; Nominated – Independent Spirit Award for Best Male Lead; Nominated – London Film Critics Circle Award for Actor of the Year; Nominated – San Francisco Film Critics Circle Award for Best Actor; Nominated – Screen Actors Guild Award for Outstanding Performance by a Male Actor in a Leading Role; Nominated – St. Louis Gateway Film Critics Association Award for Best Actor; Nominated – Satellite Award for Best Actor – Motion Picture
2019	Freaks	Best Actor at Horrorant International Film Festival
