= Josette Bushell-Mingo =

Swedish-English actress and director

Josette Bushell-Mingo OBE
- Born: 16 February 1964 (age 62); Lewisham, London, England
- Occupations: Stage actress, theatre director
- Years active: 1989–present
- Spouse: Stefan Karsberg
- Children: 2
- Awards: OBE, H. M. The King's Medal
- Website: josettebushellmingo.com

Josette Bushell-Mingo OBE (born 16 February 1964) is a Sweden-based English theatre actress and director of African descent, who was born in London and has been living and working in Sweden for many years. In February 2021, the Royal Central School of Speech and Drama announced she had been appointed as the incoming Principal of the School. She is the first person of African descent, the first woman since 1942, and the third woman overall to hold this role. Previously, she served as artistic director for the National Touring Swedish Deaf Theatre ensemble TystTeater for 13 years before accepting a position as the Head of the theatre department at the Stockholm University of the Arts in 2019.

== Background ==
Josette Bushell-Mingo was born in 1964 in the Lewisham area of London to Guyanese parents – her father was a bus driver, her mother a nurse – and grew up in Plaistow. She has three sisters. At 17, she auditioned for and was admitted to Barking College, where she did her A levels in Drama, Theatre Design, and Performing Arts. During her last two weeks at Barking, she received two offers: one from Breton University to pursue a BA in theatre and the other from Kaboodle Theatre Company. She chose Kaboodle because "a black girl [was] in it as well". After Kaboodle, she acted with the Royal Shakespeare Company and the Royal National Theatre.

== Career ==
In 1999, she appeared as Solveig in the Royal Exchange Manchester production of Peer Gynt and she returned in 2005 to play Cleopatra in Antony and Cleopatra. Both productions were directed by Braham Murray. She was nominated for a Laurence Olivier Award in 1999 for Best Actress in a Musical for her role as Rafiki in the London production of The Lion King. She has also worked with Doppleganger Theatre Company, Kiss Theatre Company (Holland), Black Mime, Half Moon Young People's Theatre, Lumiere & Son Theatre Company, and Rainmaker Theatre for the Deaf.

In 2001, she founded the Push Arts Festival with the Young Vic Theatre, an event that aims both to empower Black creators as well as to normalize their presence and leadership within major institutions within the theatre community and beyond. She also served as its artistic director. It was because of her efforts with Push that she was awarded an OBE in 2006. In 2010, she was one of several Afro-Swede actors to found TRYCK, a community for Black actors in Sweden.

In 2016, she wrote and performed Nina - A Story About Me and Nina Simone, a "deeply personal and often searing show inspired by the singer and activist Nina Simone, at the Unity Theatre. The show ran at the Young Vic Theatre in July 2017 before moving to the Traverse Theatre in August.

From 2005-2018, she was the Artistic Director for the National Touring Swedish Deaf Theatre ensemble TystTeater. The company's 2008 signed production of The Odyssey received huge critical acclaim in Scandinavia.

After leaving the National Touring Swedish Deaf Theatre, she became the Head of Acting at the Stockholm University of the Arts. She is the first woman to hold this position.

Bushell-Mingo has served as the Chairwoman for CinemAfrica and as a board member for the Swedish Film Institute, Women in Film and Television Sweden, and the Stockholm Academy of Dramatic Arts. She has also given lectures and taught at a number of theatre schools such as London Academy of Music and Dramatic Art, New York University Tisch School of the Arts, Coventry University, London College of Fashion, and Malmö Theatre Academy.

Though she primarily works in theatre, Bushell-Mingo has also appeared in the Swedish show Nudlar och 08:or as Martha in 1997 and in a 2015 episode of Bröllop, begravning och dop as Xamina. She has also starred in the films Girls & Boys (dir. Ninja Thyberg, 2015); Flickan, mamman och demonerna (dir. Suzanne Osten, 2016). She also headlined as Kandia in Dani Kouyaté's award-winning film While We Live.

== Personal life ==
Bushell-Mingo has lived in Sweden for nearly 20 years. She is married to Swedish producer Stefan Karsberg; they have two sons, Ruben and Joshua. She is fluent in Swedish sign language.

== Stage credits ==
=== Directing credits ===
Year	Title	Company	Venue
1989-1990	The School for Wives (with Kathryn Hunter and Neil Bartlett)	Derby Playhouse	
1991	Dreamhouse	Aspects Theatre Company	Oval House Theatre
1992-1993	Trickster's Payback	Black Theatre Co-operative	Warehouse Theatre
1993	Edwina	Aspect Theatre Productions and Barking College	Battersea Arts Centre
1995	The House of Bernarda Alba	Aspect Theatre Productions	Brixton Shaw Theatre and Greenwich Theatre
1996	Fire		Battersea Arts Centre
1998	King Lear (co-director: Lee Beagley)	Kaboodle Theatre Company	Teatro Municipal (Almagro) and UK
1998	The Tango Room	Aspect Theatre Productions	Loughborough Hotel
2004	Mother Courage and Her Children	New Wolsey Theatre, Birmingham Repertory Theatre, and Nottingham Playhouse	Nottingham Playhouse
2004	Simply Heavenly	Young Vic Theatre	Trafalgar Studios and West End theatre
2004	Two Step	PUSH 04	Almeida Theatre
2007	The Penelopiad	National Arts Centre and Royal Shakespeare Theatre	Swan Theatre and National Arts Centre
2008	The Odyssey	National Touring Swedish Deaf Theatre TystTeater	
2008	When We Dead Awaken	Unity Theatre, National Swedish Touring Theatre, and Västerbottensteatern	Västerbottensteatern, Stora Scenen, Unity Theatre, Stadsteatern, Pustervik, Teater 1, Sagateatern (Linköping), Kristianstads Teater, and Bredgatan 3 (Lund)
2008	The Ghost Sonata	People Show, Merseyside Dance Initiative, Liverpool Institute for Performing Arts, and Hope Street	Sefton Park Palm House
2009	A Midsummer Night's Dream	Toi Whakaari	Te Whaea
2009-2010	Oliver Twist	Octagon Theatre	Octagon Theatre
2010	GLO	Volcano Theatre	Fleck Dance Theatre
2011	Zémire et Azor	Royal Swedish Opera and the University College of Opera	Tensta Träff
2011	The Wiz	Birmingham Repertory Theatre and West Yorkshire Playhouse	New Alexandra Theatre and West Yorkshire Playhouse
2011	King Lear	Kaboodle Theatre Company	Unity Theatre and Watermans Arts Centre
2016	A Raisin in the Sun	National Theatre of Sweden	National Swedish Touring Theatre
2017	The Bubbly Black Girl Sheds Her Chameleon Skin	Theatre Royal Stratford East and Belgrade Theatre	Theatre Royal Stratford East
2019	Woza Albert!	The National Black Theatre of Sweden	Kulturhuset Stadsteatern (Vällingby)
2019	The Tempest	Citadel/Banff Centre Professional Theatre	Citadel Theatre

=== Acting credits ===
Year	Title	Role	Director	Venue
1987	PANIC		Hilary Westlake	Chapter Arts Centre
1988	Under the Moon			Institute of Contemporary Arts
1990	Woza Albert!		Alby James	
1990	The Dramatic Attitudes of Fanny Kemble	An Actress, Psyche	Patrick Sandford	Nuffield Theatre
1991-1992	Antigone	Chorus	Adrian Noble	Swan Theatre, West End theatre, Barbican Theatre, and Newcastle Playhouse
1991-1992	The Two Gentlemen of Verona	Silvia, Lucetta	David Thacker	Swan Theatre, Barbican Theatre and Newcastle Playhouse
1991-1992	Oedipus at Colonus	Chorus	Adrian Noble	Swan Theatre, Barbican Theatre and Newcastle Playhouse
1991-1992	Oedipus Tyrannos	Chorus	Adrian Noble	Swan TheatreBarbican Theatre and Newcastle Playhouse
1991-1992	The Virtuoso	Clarinda	Phyllida Lloyd	Swan Theatre, The Pit and Newcastle Playhouse
1992	Metropolis Kabarett	Special Guest	Henry Goodman	National Theatre Terrace Cafe
1993	From the Mississippi Delta		Annie Castledine	Cochrane Theatre
1993	Romeo and Juliet	Juliet	Gwenda Hughes	Birmingham Repertory Theatre
1994	The Threepenny Opera		Annie Castledine	
1995	Women of Troy	Cassandra	Annie Castledine	The National Theatre
1995	A Midsummer Night's Dream	Titania	Karin Beier	Düsseldorfer Schauspielhaus
1996	Fire		Josette Bushell-Mingo	Battersea Arts Centre
1996	Everyman	Charlatan Priest, Death, Kindred, Knowledge	Kathryn Hunter and Marcello Magni	The Other Place
1997	The Creation	Eve, Japheth's wife, Mother Mary	Katie Mitchell	The Other Place
1997	The Passion	Adulterous woman, Esther, Mother Mary	Katie Mitchell	The Other Place
1998	The Mysteries	Bathsheba, Eve, Lot's 2nd daughter, Mary, Noah's daughter	Katie Mitchell	The Pit
1998	Everyman	Charlatan Priest, Death, Kindred, Knowledge	Marcello Magni	Brooklyn Academy of Music Majestic Theater and The Pit
1999	Peer Gynt	Solveig	Braham Murray	Royal Exchange
1999	The Lion King	Rafiki	Julie Taymor	Barbican Theatre
1999	Teenage Elvis	Elvis Presley		Young Vic Theatre and Royal Exchange
2002	The Birds	Hoopoe, Poseidon	Kathryn Hunter	Lyttelton Theatre
2002	The Vagina Monologues			Ambassadors Theatre, Arts Theatre, and Wyndham's Theatre
2005	Antony and Cleopatra	Cleopatra	Braham Murray	Royal Exchange
2011	The Iron Man	Star Spirit	Pete Townshend	Young Vic Theatre
2016	Nina - A Story About Me and Nina Simone	Nina Simone	Josette Bushell-Mingo	Unity Theatre

== Honours and awards ==
Year	Award Body	Award	Work	Notes	Citation
1992	Royal Shakespeare Theatre	Player of the Year	Performance in Two Gentlemen of Verona, The Virtuoso, and The Thebans (dir. David Thacker)		
1993	Manchester Evening News Theatre Awards	Best Actress	Performance in From the Mississippi Delta (dir. Annie Castledine)	Award shared with Joy Richardson and Pauline Black	
1999	Society of London Theatre	Laurence Olivier Award for Best Actress in a Musical	Performance in The Lion King (dir. Julie Taymor)	Nominated	
2004	Women of the Year Lunch	Craymer Award for Enterprise	Excellence in theatre		
2005	Arts Council England	deciBel Visual Arts Award	Excellence in theatre		
2006	United Kingdom	Officer of the Order of the British Empire	Services to the theatre		
2012	Swedish Language Council	Minority Language Award	Promotion of Swedish sign language		
2012		Stockholm City Cultural Prize	Performing arts	Honorary award	
2013	Swedish National Association of the Deaf	Minority Language Award	Promotion of Swedish sign language		
2017	Africa Movie Academy Awards	Best Actress in a Leading Role	Performance in While We Live	Nominated	
2018	Gannevik Foundation/The Swedish Arts Grants Committee	Artist scholarship	Excellence in theatre		
2018		Performing Arts Inspiration Artist	Excellence in theatre		
2018	Women of the World Festival	Outstanding Achievement Award	For writing and performing in Nina - A Story About Me and Nina Simone	Nominee	
2019	Expressens Kulturpris	Theatre Award	Excellence in theatre		
2021	Sweden	H. M. The King's Medal in gold of the 8th size worn on the chest suspended by the Order of the Seraphim ribbon	Significant contributions in Swedish performing arts		
