= Annie Castledine =

British theatre director, teacher and dramaturg

- Born: Ann Castledine; 26 February 1939; Sheffield, Yorkshire, England, UK
- Died: 4 June 2016 (aged 77); Eastbourne, Sussex, England, UK
- Education: University of York, Goldsmiths
- Occupations: Director dramaturg teacher

Ann "Annie" Castledine (26 February 1939 – 4 June 2016), was a British theatre director, teacher and dramaturg.

Described in The Guardian as "one of the arts world's best-known secrets" who "shaped some of the most influential players in British theatre" and had a "genius for doing work that is unfashionable". Peter Brook described her as an "outstanding director of European classical and contemporary plays".

She was regarded as an expert on the dramas of Bertolt Brecht, William Shakespeare, Anton Chekhov and Henrik Ibsen, as well as being noted for her championing of new talent in British theatre and the arts, including work with new playwrights and the training of new directors. In supporting the development of British theatre, she was often likened to Joan Littlewood – the "mother of modern (English) theatre".

== Early life ==
Born in 1939, Ann Castledine grew up in Yorkshire and initially worked as a teacher. She attended the University of York as a mature student and turned to theatre directing in the 1970s.

She was the eldest child of three born to Ida Castledine (née Armstrong) and Walter Cecil Castledine, who worked as an electrical engineer employed by the National Coal Board at coal mines including Kiveton Park Colliery. Her mother worked to run the household and bring up three children, while also donating time to the NSPCC. Ida and Cecil were keen on plays and theatre and placed an emphasis on education as a means of betterment. Castledine claimed to have been well-versed with Greek and Roman mythology and literature at the age of 5. A bright student, she considered her early career prospects to be firmly established by her gender and class – in press interviews she recalled making the choice to work as a teacher, having been presented with a choice between becoming a teacher or becoming a nurse.

Castledine attributed some of her early interest in theatre directing to the influence of Honor Mathews, who had been the head of drama at Goldsmiths College, London, during her own training. After working in London state schools as a teacher, and as senior lecturer in drama at Bulmershe College, Castledine attended the University of York as a mature student and found herself becoming preoccupied with directing plays. This early work was spotted by Michael Winter, the then director of York's Theatre Royal, who offered her the chance to be his Arts Council trainee in 1979.

== Theatres and theatrical companies ==
Much of Castledine's theatrical work was carried out on a freelance basis and involved productions for a great number of British theatres and companies, including the Royal Shakespeare Company and the Royal National Theatre.

Her career also included periods as the artistic director for Derby Playhouse (1987–90). Prior to which she was Associate Artistic Director at Theatr Clwyd (1985–87). She also worked regularly at Chichester Festival Theatre.

While based in York, early in her directing career, Castledine ran her own small production company – Northern Studio Theatre. Later in her career, she frequently collaborated with Complicité.

== Collaborators ==
Repeat collaborators included Stephen Daldry, Neil Bartlett, Simon McBurney, Annabel Arden, Josette Bushell-Mingo, Iona McLeish, Kathryn Hunter, Marcello Magni, Maureen Lawrence, Gillian Wright, Bryony Lavery, Beatrix Campbell, Corin Redgrave, Kika Markham, Jane Birkin, Mark Wheatley Polly Irvin, Roger Allam, Colin Ellwood and Catherine Bailey.

== Theatre productions ==
Selected productions include:

- In 1990, Annie Castledine directed a production of The Caretaker by Harold Pinter at the Sherman Theatre in Cardiff. It was noted as the first-ever production to have the title part played by a woman, Miriam Karlin.
- In 1991, she co-directed with Stephen Daldry "a revelatory, award-winning pair of 1920s plays", Pioneers in Ingolstadt and Purgatory in Ingolstadt, by Marieluise Fleißer, at the Gate Theatre (London). These productions won the Time Out London Award for Best Director (1991).
- In 1992–93, she directed Marching for Fausa by Biyi Bandele, the first African play to be staged at the Royal Court in London since 1966.
- In 1993, she directed From The Mississippi Delta by Endesha Ida Mae Holland at the Cochrane Theatre. Winner of the Bass Charrington London Fringe Award for Best Ensemble and Best Director.
- At the Royal National Theatre in 1995, she directed an "impressive" and "unforgettable" production of the Women of Troy.
- In 2002, she directed Meredith Oakes' play Man for Hire in a season of new plays commissioned by Laura Harvey and Alan Ayckbourn at the Stephen Joseph Theatre.
- Cambridge Arts Theatre on 13–16 October 2004, Oedipus Tyrannus, The Cambridge Greek Play of 2004, in the original language – A tradition that goes back to 1882 (The History of Cambridge Greek Play: https://www.cambridgegreekplay.com/the-history-of-the-cambridge-greek-play). Production team included Designer: Simon Brimson-Lewis, Lighting Designer: Ben Payne, Musical Director / Composer: Sinan Savaskan, Choreographer: Shona Morris. https://www.cambridgegreekplay.com/plays/2004/oedipus-tyrannus
- In 2010, at the Arcola Theatre in 2010, she co-directed with Annabel Arden Thomas Bernhard's last play Heldenplatz. It was reviewed in the British press: "The superb Arcola staging made the case for Bernhard, a major European dramatist, for the first time, in effect, in this country."
- Annie Castledine played a role in the creation of The Encounter, based on the book Amazon Beaming by Petru Popescu. The one-person show was first devised, directed and performed by Simon McBurney in 2015. Castledine had suggested the piece for adaptation to McBurney, with the gift of an inscribed book, 20 years before. It has been performed across the UK and Europe.

== Radio productions ==
By Annie Castledine and Pier Productions:

- Book at Bedtime: Three stories written by Stefan Zweig. Originally broadcast on BBC Radio 4 in January 2005.
- Sister Under the Skin written by Corin Redgrave, starring Corin Redgrave and Kika Markham. Originally broadcast on BBC Radio 4 in March 2005

Directed by Castledine and produced by Catherine Bailey Productions:

- Gaslight written by Patrick Hamilton, starring Juliet Stevenson, Roger Allam and Corin Redgrave. Originally broadcast on BBC Radio 4.
- Lady Audley's Secret written by Mary Bradden, adapted by Bryony Lavery, starring Francesca Annis. Originally broadcast on BBC Radio 4 in 2000.
- Oh Sorry, Were You Asleep? written by Jane Birkin, starring Jane Birkin and Corin Redgrave. Originally broadcast on BBC Radio 4.
- Hymn to Love – Homage to Piaf. Originally broadcast on BBC Radio 3.
- One Small Step written by Mark Wheatley. Originally broadcast on BBC Radio 4.
- One Small Good Thing adapted by Mark Wheatley from a short story by Raymond Carver. Originally broadcast on BBC Radio 4.
- The Lovers of Viorne written by Marguerite Duras, adapted by Bryony Lavery. Originally broadcast on BBC Radio 3 in October 2004.
- Boniface and Me written by Gillian Plowman. Originally broadcast on BBC Radio 4 in December 2007.
- Gracey and Me written by Gillian Plowman. Originally broadcast on BBC Radio 4 in October 2010.
- Gilead adapted by Mike Kenny from the novel by Marilynne Robinson. Originally broadcast on BBC Radio 3 in November 2010.

== Television productions ==
Produced by Annie Castledine:

- Henry IV written by William Shakespeare, adapted and directed by John Caird, starring Ronald Pickup. Originally broadcast on BBC 2 on 28 October 1995.

Directed by Annie Castledine:

- The Colour of Light written by Sheila Yeger, starring Kim Hicks, Barbara Marten and Rob Pickavance. Originally broadcast on BBC 2 on 24 July 1997.

== Teaching ==
- Bulmershe College
- Guildhall School of Music and Drama, including productions of When Nora Left Her Husband by Elfriede Jelinek.
- Rose Bruford College: Placement Tutor from 2004 to 2010; teacher of the 'New Writing Production Module', 'The BAC Final Production Module', 'The Brecht Course', 'The Chekhov Course', and 'Lectures on Classic Texts'. Honorary Fellow.
- University of Manchester/Rose Bruford College: creation (2009–10) of a distance learning course with Polly Irvin, 'Four Contemporary Directors and the Stories They Tell'.
- University of Cambridge, Cambridge Greek plays.

Castledine was also a long-standing Patron of the British Regional Theatre Young Director Scheme, serving alongside fellow Patrons Phyllida Lloyd, Trevor Nunn, Adrian Noble, Michael Boyd, Michael Grade and Michael Billington.

== Books ==
- Plays by Women, Volume 9, first published by Methuen Drama for Bloomsbury Publishing in 1992, edited and introduced by Annie Castledine.
- Plays by Women, Volume 10, first published by Methuen Drama for Bloomsbury Publishing in 1994, edited and introduced by Annie Castledine.
- Interviewed in On Directing: Interviews with Directors, edited by Gabriella Giannachi and Mary Buckhurst, published by Faber & Faber 1999.

== Death ==
She died in June 2016, aged 77, in hospital in Eastbourne.

== Family ==
Castledine was survived by her sister, brother, five nieces and a nephew. This family includes the classicist Helen Morales.

== Quotations by Annie Castledine ==
- "Our priority then and now is to extend our hands across cultural barriers to grasp our common humanity. If we ignore that, we are condemning the whole human race."
- "Too many theatres are driven by caution and a desire to do work that is proven."
- "I hadn't realised regional rep was about money. I thought it was about encouraging the young and being radical."
- "When you spend so many weeks in the presence of a great playwright with a challenging voice and a political consciousness, then your quality of life goes into the stratosphere."
- "If women playwrights are not given enough practice through production and have to snatch what experience they can... it is because their work is not the first choice of those in power in our theatre."
- "The curse of our theatre is the linear, suburban imagination which has to be literal about time and place."
- "In doing it for us, the characters allow us to also experience the scream. Hugely cathartic, hugely important. Classless, timeless, placeless."
- "Theatre is an abused art form here. And it is undervalued because it is underfunded."
- "When you have nothing else you have words, so use those words."

== Quotations about Annie Castledine ==
- Stephen Daldry CBE, director & producer: "A giant, a mother and a force for all that's best in the theatre."
- Sarah Brigham, artistic director and chief executive of Derby Playhouse: "Annie was fearless in her programming of Derby Playhouse, encouraging innovation, work of the highest quality and encouraging audiences to take as many risks as we ask artists to."
- Mike Kenny, playwright: "I don't think they make them like Annie any more... She had a belief in the creativity of ordinary people and never compromised on a parallel belief in excellence. She promoted women's work and diversity when it wasn't fashionable. She threw together volatile groups of creative people and often produced magic and sometimes, it has to be said, chaos. If you were an actor in her rehearsal room, every day was like having a full house – the quality of the attention she paid you was as enormous as she was as a personality. I did smile when I heard that she died on the same day as Muhammad Ali. If those two met at the Pearly Gates, I wouldn't fancy his chances."
- Lyn Gardner, critic and journalist: "[O]ne of the most energising and dynamic talents in the business. She was always a late starter... Castledine's work... combines an English working-class and feminist toughness tempered by a lyric, European sensibility."
- Peter Brook CH CBE, director: "[Castledine] has defined herself as an outstanding director of European classical and contemporary plays, bringing a compelling visionary power to the stage."
