= American Story (radio program) =

American radio anthology program (1944–1945)

American Story is an American radio anthology program that was broadcast on NBC February 5, 1944 - July 15, 1944 and July 13, 1945 - September 7, 1945. It traced "the history, development and fulfillment of the literature of the Americas" as part of the NBC Inter-American University of The Air, the third permanent radio series presented as part of that program. In addition to the NBC presentations, episodes were broadcast in French in Canada and in Spanish in Peru.

== Background ==
Archibald MacLeish, who was then the librarian of Congress, created American Story and developed the concept into a program. He said that people in the Americas did not realize how much their backgrounds had in common, and he thought that lack of understanding was "one reason the Americas find it so difficult to get along, one with the other". MacLeish said, "From Alaska to the tip of South America, every stage of life was the same." He pointed out common stages of development:

- settling on a shoreline
- gradually moving into a wilderness area
- establishing one frontier after another
- having a colonial stage with a foreign government
- gaining freedom via revolution.

MacLeish realized that libraries throughout the Americans contained contemporary accounts of how countries had begun and had developed and that radio could be used to present accounts from those records, bypassing "modern synthesized history". Radio enabled those original accounts to be enhanced with explanations of background information by a narrator and by using sound effects to transport the listener to the appropriate time frame.

== Overview ==
MacLeish created the scripts and narrated the broadcasts, with the format varying by episode, depending on the week's subject matter. MacLeish pointed out that he was not writing scripts in a traditional sense but was using factual records that were dramatic in their own right. As an example he cited the premiere episode, which used excerpts from Christopher Columbus's journals.

Sources used in the series included The Journal of Columbus; The Voyages of Jacques Cartier; The Principal Navigations, Voyages, Traffiques, and Discoveries of the English Nation by Richard Hakluyt; and The First Part of the Royal Commentaries of the Yncas by Garcilaso de la Vega. Real-life characters depicted on broadcasts included William Bradford, Jacques Cartier, and Gaspar de Carvajal, who spoke words from texts that they had written. Some episodes included fictional characters such as Second Narrator, Bronze Voice, and Clerk, who provided perspectives on the events being related.

The series returned by popular request in the summer of 1945 with Arnold Moss as the narrator.

== Episodes ==
1944 Episodes of American Story
Date	Episode
February 5, 1944	"The Discovery"
February 12, 1944	"The Discoverers"
February 19, 1944	"The Amerigo"
February 26, 1944	"The Discovered"
March 4, 1944	"The Indians View the Arrival"
March 11, 1944	"The War on Indians"
March 18, 1944	"The Accounts from the New-Found Land"
March 25, 1944	"The Settlement"
April 1, 1944	"The Colonial Experience"
April 8, 1944	"The Wars of Freedom"
April 15, 1944	"The Westward Thrust"
April 22, 1944	"The Moving Frontier"
April 29, 1944	"Thc Bowed Shapes"
May 13, 1944	"The Infection of Freedom"
May 20, 1944	"Thc Loyalists"
May 27, 1944	"Arms and the Man"
June 3, 1944	"Thc Spiritual Tyranny"
June 10, 1944	"The Industrial Revolution"
June 17, 1944	"Doubling Our Heritage"
July 1, 1944	"Western Waters and Westward Farers"
July 8, 1944	"Oregon and China"
July 15, 1944	"Bastile Day: The Franco-American Amity"

1945 Episodes of American Story
Date	Episode
July 13, 1945	"The Names for the Rivers"
July 20, 1945	"The American Name"
July 27, 1945	"The Discovered"
August 3, 1945	"The American Gods"
August 10, 1945	"The Many Dead"
August 17, 1945	"Ripe Strawberries and Gooseberries and Sweet Single Roses"
August 24, 1945	"Between Silence and the Surf"
August 31, 1945	"Nat Bacon's Bones"
September 7, 1945	"Socorro, When Your Sons Forget"

== Production ==
MacLeish used sound as a way of projecting the listener into scenes. His desire to achieve more realism on American Story led to the creation of new techniques for sound effects. In the first episode, a large block of wood in a tank containing agitated water simulated the sound of a ship turning, causing a change in the pitch of the waves hitting the vessel. A miniature sail and an "artificial wind producer" created the sound of wind blowing into billowing sails.

One episode that focused on the Incas of Mexico and Peru included use of tree trunks and original wooden ceremonial drums. That broadcast involved music based on a pentatonic scale, which was used by the Incas.

Muna Lee supervised research for the series. Frank Papp was the director, and Morris Mamorsky was the musical director. Allan Nevins wrote for the program in April 1944 when MacLeish was away. The series was broadcast on Saturdays from 7 to 7:30 p.m. Eastern Time.

== Critical response ==
Ben Gross, writing in the New York Daily News, called the program's debut episode "an auspicious premiere". He noted that use of excerpts from Columbus's journal "made for a historical accuracy rare in radio".

The Birmingham (England) Gazette described American Story as "eloquent yet almost devoid of advanced dramatic radio technique".

A review of the premiere episode in The New York Times called the project "A prodigious task, clearly" and added, "The talk goes that it will run for years ...". The review complimented the program's simplicity, in contrast to the "vast lot of fanfare" often heard on radio. It said that MacLeish was not a "slick performer", but noted "... his prose sings, and whoever gives it the courtesy of careful attention will appreciate it the more for his very lack of declamation."

Time said in a review after eight episodes had been broadcast that the series was "dignified and resonant rather than compelling". It said that the scripts relied too much on conversation with "little use of advanced, dramatic radio techniques".

The trade publication Variety called the premiere episode "dully comprehensible", saying, "It was notably lacking in the dramatic values by which audience interest could be won, and then developed. The review indicated that the episode had too much of the spoken word from Columbus and the narrator and too little use of sound effects to enhance the production.

== Supplemental material ==
NBC published a handbook compiled by Lee that provided reference material related to the program that was also intended to encourage reading about the subjects covered. Copies were available for 25 cents each from the network.

Denver's public library featured weekly book displays related to American Story broadcasts. An announcement at the end of each broadcast on station KOA encouraged members of the audience to visit the library.

== Book ==
In 1945 Duell, Sloan and Pearce published The American Story, a collection of 10 scripts from the series. A review in the Pasadena Star-News found the reproduction of scripts "nothing to enthuse about", adding that the content would have been communicated more effectively if MacLeish "had rewritten them into the excellent exposition of which he is capable."

A review in the New York Daily Worker newspaper expressed mixed feelings about MacLeish's work. It noted that the program and book allocated "two and a half excellent scripts" to Indian civilizations in Mexico and Peru but did not mention "the forced migrations from Africa which contributed richly to later events and to the blood of our own time." The reviewer also said that sometimes episodes focused too much on historical texts, where more dramatization might have improved the broadcast. Overall, the reviewer expressed gratitude to MacLeish "for taking rich historic minerals out of obscurity, away from the precious scholars, and presenting them not only for future poets and playwrights to fashion their art with, but for each new generation driving forward, as a deathless inspiration."
