= Ravage (film) =

- Directed by: Teddy Grennan
- Written by: Teddy Grennan
- Produced by: Marsha Oglesby; Bennett Krishock; Teddy Grennan
- Starring: Annabelle Dexter-Jones; Bruce Dern
- Distributed by: Brainstorm Media
- Release date: November 15, 2019 (Cucalorus)
- Running time: 84 minutes
- Country: United States
- Language: English

Ravage (formerly titled Swing Low) is a 2019 American horror thriller film written and directed by Teddy Grennan, and starring Annabelle Dexter-Jones and Bruce Dern.

== Plot ==
Alone in the woods, nature photographer Harper witnesses a violent crime. After being captured by the culprits, she uses her survivalist skills to try and make it out alive.

== Cast ==
- Annabelle Dexter-Jones as Harper
- Robert Longstreet as Ravener
- Bruce Dern as Mallincrkrodt
- Michael Weaver as Superintendent Slayton
- Ross Partridge as Sheriff Pendegras

== Release ==
The film was screened at the Cucalorus Film Festival on November 15, 2019. In June 2020, it was announced that Brainstorm Media acquired U.S. distribution rights to the film, which was released in select theaters and on VOD on August 21, 2020.

== Reception ==
The film has a 63% rating on Rotten Tomatoes based on eight reviews.

Alex Saveliev of Film Threat rated the film a 6 out of 10.
