= McLish =

McLish is a surname. Notable people with the surname include:

- Cal McLish (1925–2010), American baseball player
- Rachel McLish (born 1955), American bodybuilder

== See also ==
- McLeish
