= Cafe Istanbul =

American radio program

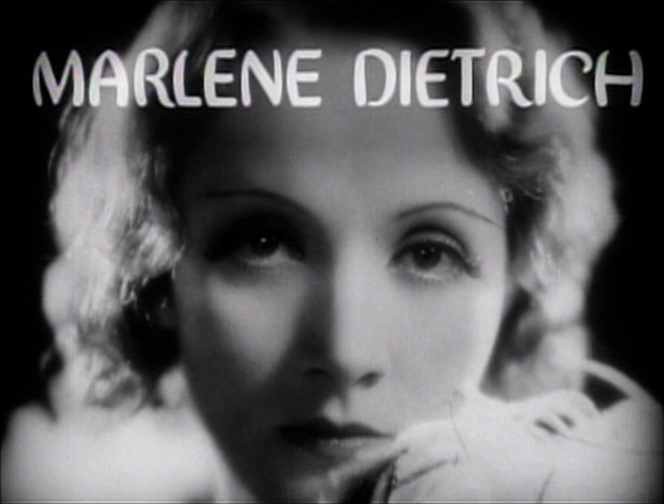
- Marlene Dietrich
- Genre: Foreign intrigue/adventure
- Country of origin: United States
- Language(s): English
- Syndicates: American Broadcasting Company
- Starring: Marlene Dietrich; Ken Lynch; Arnold Moss
- Directed by: Marx Leebe
- Produced by: Leonard Blair
- Original release: January 6 – December 28, 1952

Cafe Istanbul is an old-time radio foreign intrigue and adventure program in the United States. It was broadcast on ABC January 6, 1952 - December 28, 1952.

== Format ==
Mademoiselle Madou was the singer in Cafe Istanbul, a cabaret located somewhere in the Far East. Patrons of the cafe included "spies, criminals and the Secret Police," and Madou became involved with some of them in each episode.

Jack O'Brian, a reviewer for International News Service, wrote in his radio-television column that the program, "which fills the air with a flavor mixed generously of throaty innuendo, sinister and exotic citizens of foreign extraction, is a fairly unbelievable mishmash but we have no complaints much on that score." He concluded that it was an "earful of sultry fun."

== Personnel ==
Marlene Dietrich played Mademoiselle Madou, a role that was "created specifically for" her. Dietrich was apparently the power behind the show. In the book Dietrich Icon, Gerd Gemünden and Mary R. Desjardins wrote, "A radio executive told Colliers: 'The radio show is her package. She got the idea for it — based on the role she played in The Blue Angel — and she hires the actors and writers with her own money." They also cited an article in Time that described Dietrich as sitting up until 3 a.m. "pecking out 17 pages of script revisions for the first show."

Ken Lynch played Christopher Gard, "an American young man of mysterious connections, who holds a unique place in the affections of Mlle. Madou". Arnold Moss played police Colonel Raul Felki, who didn't know "whether to make love to Madou or throw her in jail." Marx Leebe was the director, and Leonard Blair was the producer. Bernard Green provided the music.
