= Arnold Moss =

American actor (1910–1989)

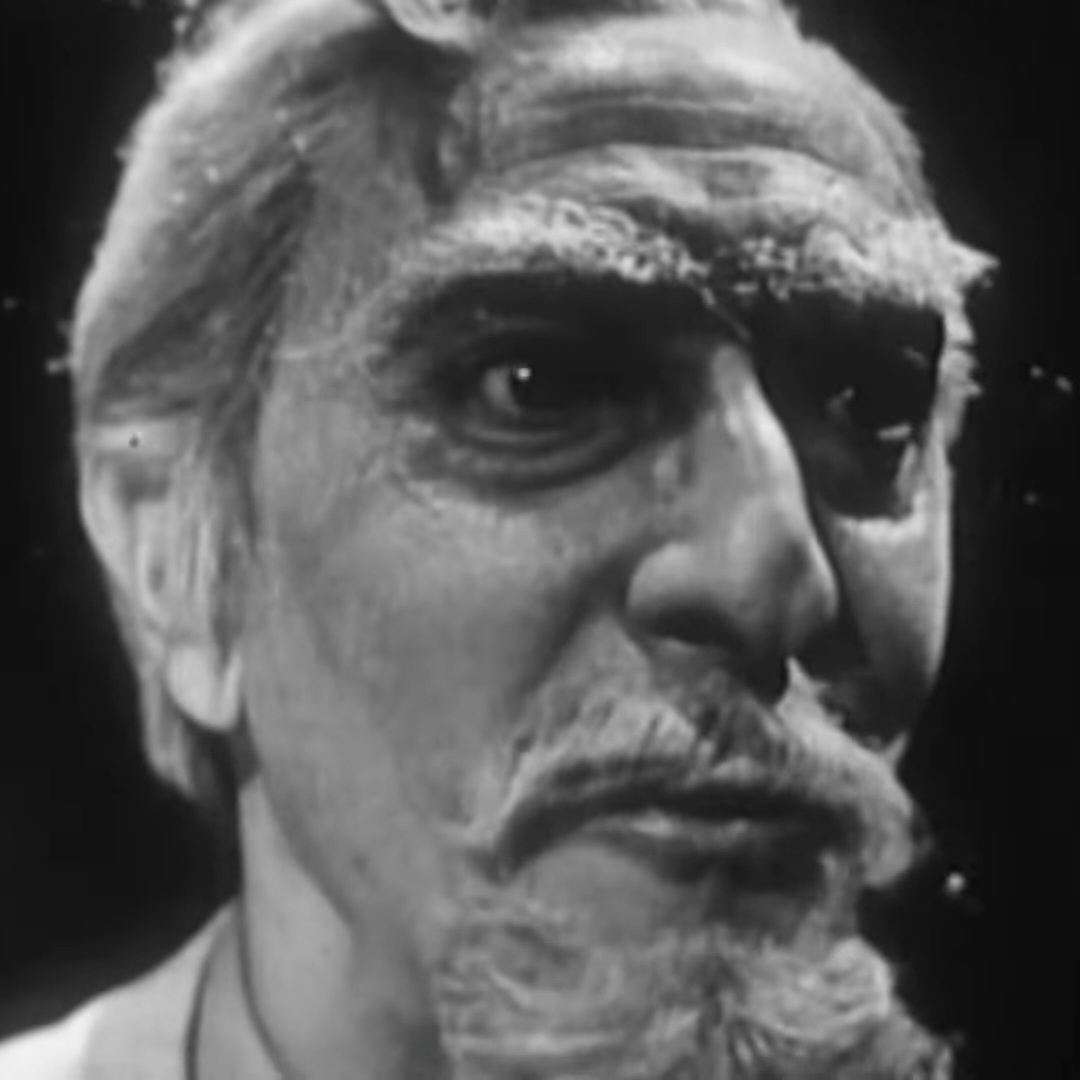
- Moss in a screenshot from the TV series Suspense (1952)
- Born: January 28, 1909; New York City, New York, U.S.
- Died: December 15, 1989 (aged 80); New York City, New York, U.S.
- Education: City College of New York; Columbia University (MA); New York University (PhD)
- Occupation: Actor
- Years active: 1946–1976
- Spouse: Stella Reynolds (m. 1933)
- Children: 2

Arnold Moss (January 28, 1909 – December 15, 1989) was an American classical and character actor, narrator-soloist, director, producer, and writer.

== Early years and education ==
Born in Flatbush, Moss was a third-generation Brooklyn native. He attended Brooklyn's Boys High School. He was a Phi Beta Kappa graduate of City College of New York, majoring in Latin and Greek, and earned a master's degree in Old French from Columbia University. His first involvement with acting came when he was in college, after which he joined the Eva Le Gallienne Apprentice Group for a two-year acting and directing apprenticeship. In the early 1960's, Moss earned a PhD in theater from New York University.

== Career ==
=== Radio ===
Moss was an announcer at two Baltimore, Maryland, radio stations, moving to WCAO in 1931 after having worked at WTAM. In 1932, he was the youngest announcer at CBS.

Moss narrated episodes of American Story in the summer of 1945. He played Dr. Fabian in Cabin B-13 on CBS radio in 1948–49, played in Cafe Istanbul on ABC radio in 1952, was Ahmed on Stella Dallas, was Philip Cameron in Against the Storm and was the first voice of the character of Ted White on the radio serial, The Guiding Light, from April 1948 to May 1949.

=== Teaching ===
In the 1930s, Moss taught speech in the speech and theater department of the Brooklyn branch of City College of New York. The United States State Department sent Moss as an American specialist in theater to Latin America, Africa, and the Far East.

=== Film ===
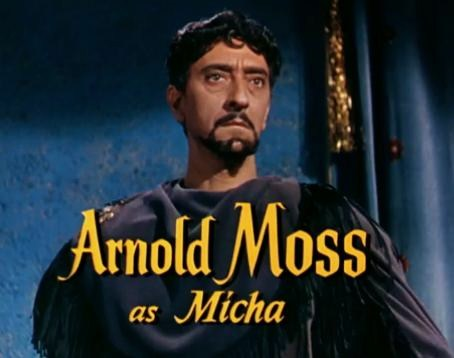
Arnold Moss in the trailer for Salome (1953)

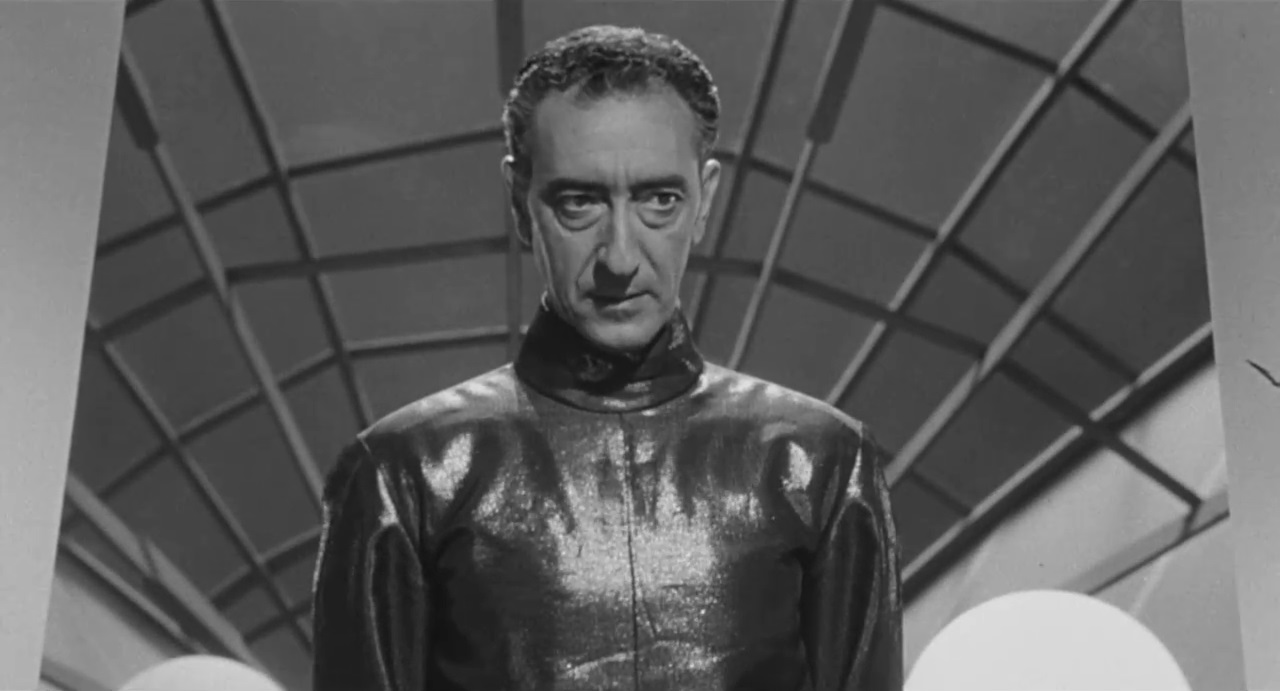
Arnold Moss as The Alien in a screenshot from the trailer for the 1957 film The 27th Day

Moss made two appearances in Bob Hope films, as Hope's Casablanca contact in the espionage spoof My Favorite Spy and as a conniving Venetian doge in Casanova's Big Night. Moss appeared in the feature film The 27th Day (1957) as The Alien. In Kim (1950) he played Lurgan, the shopkeeper and secret spy trainer.

=== Stage ===
Moss's stage career began when he acted and directed for Le Gallienne's Civic Repertory Theatre, with his first production being Peter Pan (1929). He was best known for his perceptive renderings of roles from Shakespeare's King Lear, The Tempest, Twelfth Night, and Measure for Measure. He played Prospero in Margaret Webster's 1945 production of The Tempest for a combined total of 124 performances, the longest run of the play in Broadway history. Lewis Nichols, chief drama critic of The New York Times, defined Moss's performance as "superb". He appeared in the original Broadway production of the Hal Prince/Stephen Sondheim musical Follies, playing impresario Dimitri Weismann, and played Malvolio in Twelfth Night, which performance critic Brooks Atkinson of The Times wrote was "The gem of the performance".

Moss was the spokesman for the New York Philharmonic and had a command performance for the Pope in Rome.

Moss also was narrator for orchestras in Boston, Detroit, and Milwaukee, had his own repertory company, the Shakespeare Festival Players, and toured about 50 U.S. colleges. In addition, he authored articles on theater that were published in The New York Times and other publications.

=== Television ===
Moss appeared in dozens of television programs during the golden age of TV. On June 1, 1949, he starred as the rabbi/exorcist Aesrael in "The Dybbuk", Studio One's adaptation of S. Ansky's like-named Yiddish stage classic. On November 22, 1950, Moss played the title role in Maugham's "Lord Montdrago" on Somerset Maugham TV Theatre. He appeared on television in Star Trek (1966) as mysterious actor Anton Karidian, alter-ego of the tyrannical Gov. Kodos of Tarsus IV, in the episode "The Conscience of the King". He also played in The Rifleman as the school teacher, Mr. Griswald, and as Chief Lonespear in Bonanza episode "In Defense of Honor" in 1968. Other television appearances include The Time Tunnel, The Girl from U.N.C.L.E., The Man from U.N.C.L.E., and the anthology series The Alfred Hitchcock Hour, General Electric Theater, Alfred Hitchcock Presents, Suspense, Tales of Tomorrow, Studio One, and Kraft Television Theatre.

== Personal life and death ==
Moss was awarded the James K. Hackett Medal from City College in 1968 "for distinguished achievement in dramatic arts." He died from lung cancer at his home in New York City on December 15, 1989. He was 80. He was survived by his spouse, Stella Reynolds, an actress who performed with him in the La Gallienne troupe, as well as a daughter and a son.

== Partial filmography ==
- Temptation (1946) - Ahmed Effendi
- The Loves of Carmen (1948) - Colonel
- Studio One (1949) – Rabbi Aesrael (Season 1 Episode 16: "The Dybbuk")
- Reign of Terror (a.k.a. The Black Book) (1949) - Fouché
- Border Incident (1949) - Zopilote
- Kim (1950) - Lurgan Sahib
- Quebec (1951) - Jean-Paul Racelle
- Mask of the Avenger (1951) - Colardi
- My Favorite Spy (1951) - Tasso
- Viva Zapata! (1952) - Don Nacio
- Salome (1953) - Micha
- Casanova's Big Night (1954) - the Doge
- Bengal Brigade (1954) - Rajah Karam
- Jump Into Hell (1955) - General Christian De Castries
- Hell's Island (1955) - Paul Armand
- The 27th Day (1957) - the Alien
- Alfred Hitchcock Presents (1958) (Season 4 Episode 1: "Poison") - Dr. Ganderbay
- The Rifleman (1960, TV Series) - Stevan Griswald
- The Alfred Hitchcock Hour (1962) (Season 1 Episode 5: "Captive Audience") - Victor Hartman
- Route 66 (1963, TV Series) - The King in S4:E23, "I'm Here to Kill a King"
- The Fool Killer (1965) as Reverend Spotts
- Star Trek (1966, TV Series) - Anton Karidian in S1:E13, "The Conscience of the King"
- Gambit (1966) - Abdul
- The Time Tunnel (1967, TV Series) - Kalech, High Priest of Jericho (Walls of Jericho)
- The Caper of the Golden Bulls (1967) - Mr Shanari
- The Monkees (1967) – Vidaru in S2:E3, "Everywhere a Sheik, Sheik"
- Bonanza (1968, TV Series) - Chief Lonespear (In Defense of Honor)
- Serpico (1976, TV Series) - Tiller
