= Hugh McLeish =

Scottish footballer

Personal information
- Full name: Hugh McLeish
- Date of birth: 10 June 1948
- Place of birth: Harthill, Scotland
- Date of death: December 2004 (aged 56)
- Place of death: Fleetwood, England
- Position: Forward

Youth career
- Motherwell: New Blackburn Athletic

Senior career*
Years	Team	Apps	(Gls)
1965–1967	Dundee United	0	(0)
1967	Sunderland	0	(0)
1967–1968	Luton Town	2	(0)
1968	Stevenage Town		
1968–1970	Wimbledon	14	(3)
1970–1971	Berwick Rangers	1	(0)
- * Club domestic league appearances and goals

Hugh McLeish (10 June 1948 – December 2004) was a Scottish professional footballer who played as a forward in the Football League for Luton Town and in the Scottish League for Berwick Rangers. He was on the books of Dundee United and Sunderland without appearing in the league for either, and also played for New Blackburn Athletic, Stevenage Town and Wimbledon.
