= USS MacLeish =

Clemson-class destroyer

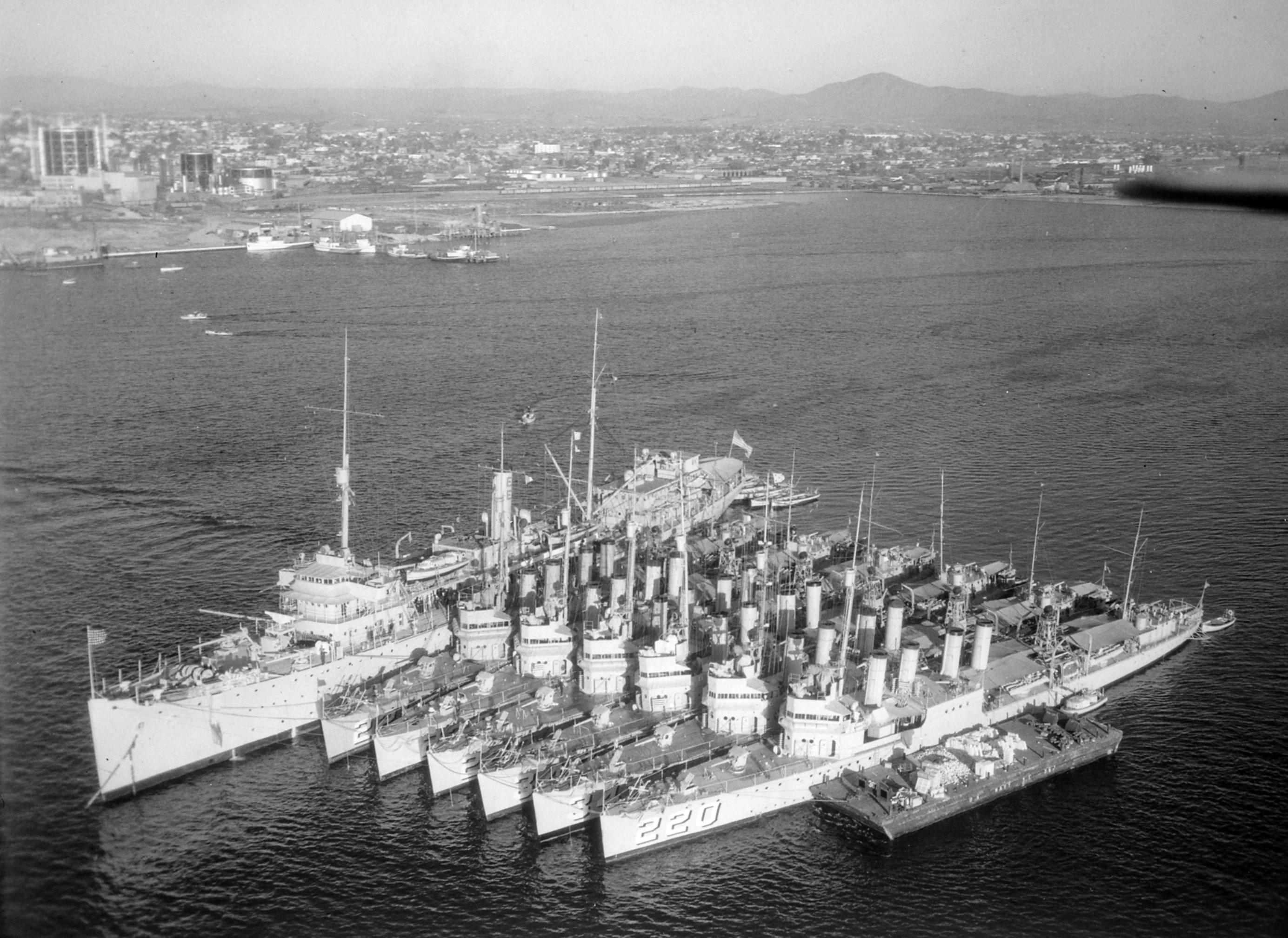
- MacLeish with other destroyers alongside USS Melville, 1932

History

United States
- Namesake: Kenneth MacLeish
- Builder: William Cramp & Sons, Philadelphia
- Yard number: 486
- Laid down: 19 August 1919
- Launched: 18 December 1919
- Commissioned: 2 August 1920
- Decommissioned: 11 March 1938
- Recommissioned: 25 September 1939
- Decommissioned: 8 March 1946
- Reclassified: Miscellaneous auxiliary (AG-87), 5 January 1945
- Stricken: 13 November 1946
- Fate: Sold for scrap, 18 December 1946

General characteristics
- Class & type: Clemson-class destroyer
- Displacement: 1,190 tons
- Length: 314 feet 5 inches (95.83 m)
- Beam: 31 feet 9 inches (9.68 m)
- Draft: 9 feet 3 inches (2.82 m)
- Speed: 35.5 knots (65.7 km/h)
- Complement: 101 officers and enlisted
- Armament: 4 x 4 in (100 mm) guns, 1 x 3 in (76 mm) gun, 12 x 21 inch (533 mm) TT.

USS MacLeish (DD-220/AG-87) was a Clemson-class destroyer in the United States Navy during World War II. She was named for Lieutenant Kenneth MacLeish.

== Construction and commissioning ==
MacLeish was laid down 19 August 1919 and launched 18 December 1919 from William Cramp & Sons; sponsored by Miss Ishbel MacLeish, sister of Lieutenant Kenneth MacLeish; and commissioned 2 August 1920.

== Service history ==
After brief duty with the U.S. Pacific Fleet, MacLeish sailed 5 June 1922 from Philadelphia to join the U.S. Naval Forces in Turkish waters. Until June 1924, she operated in the Black Sea and in the eastern Mediterranean, protecting American interests and assisting in the evacuation of refugees. In October 1922 members of her crew participated in the landings at Smyrna, Turkey. Joining the Scouting Fleet in 1924, the destroyer visited various ports in Europe before returning to the United States in July.

Shortly after arriving at Boston, Massachusetts, MacLeish departed for United States West Coast duty. On 7 May 1925 she sailed for the Asiatic Fleet, arriving at Shanghai 21 June. Operating between ports in China and the Philippines, the destroyer patrolled and trained while protecting American interests. In 1925, while on this station, members of her crew joined a force which landed at Shanghai during the civil disorder following shooting of Chinese students by municipal police. MacLeish remained in Asiatic and Pacific waters until 11 March 1938, when she was decommissioned and entered the Reserve Fleet at San Diego, California.

=== World War II ===
With the outbreak of hostilities in Europe in 1939, MacLeish recommissioned 25 September 1939. Assigned to the eastern sea frontier, she was ready for sea by 1 February 1940 and engaged in maneuvers and patrol duty in the Caribbean before being rearmed in preparation for convoy duty. By the end of January 1941, with new armament and additional fuel tanks, and following intensive training, she escorted several convoys on coastal voyages. In July, she was transferred to North Atlantic patrol and convoy operations, and continued this duty after the United States entered the war. In the spring of 1942, she was reassigned to coastal patrol and on 2 May was credited with a probable kill off the Florida coast. By February 1943, MacLeish had safely escorted 12 convoys between Norfolk, Virginia and Key West and 9 between New York and Guantanamo Bay.

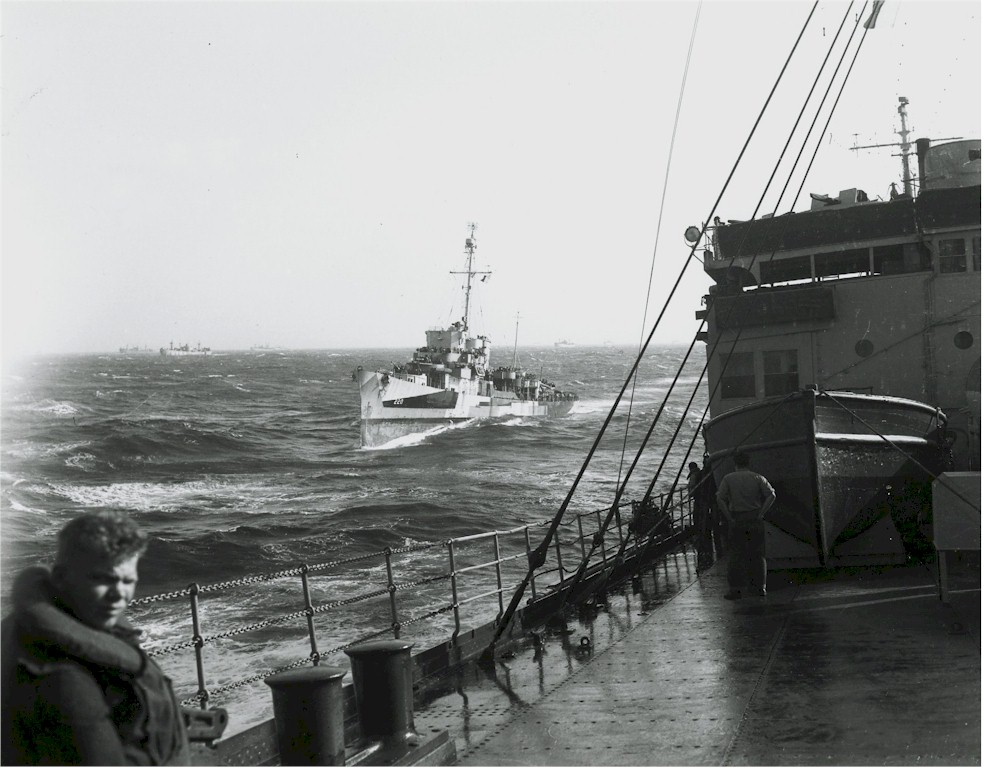
MacLeish as a convoy escort, c. 1944.

With the Allied offensive in north Africa calling for an ever-increasing flow of supplies, by February 1943, every available escort was assigned to transatlantic duty. MacLeish made two voyages between New York and Casablanca. In June she joined one of the first escort carrier groups, and for the next 7 months steamed over 50,000 miles covering the Norfolk - Casablanca convoy route. On the second trip, in July, planes from MacLeish's group made three probable sinkings.

MacLeish served the first 3 months of 1944 as a target ship for marine torpedo planes off Key West. Following overhaul, she returned to convoy duties, departing in May for ports in the Mediterranean as flagship of TF 63. After D-Day, MacLeish escorted one more convoy across the Atlantic, this time to Cherbourg. Next she served as target ship for submarines, passing through the Panama Canal on their way to the Pacific. At Boston on 5 January 1945, she was redesignated AG-87 and her topside armament was removed. Following conversion, she returned to Panama to resume duties as target ship, training 25 submarines before steaming for Rhode Island to tow targets for naval aircraft.

Decommissioned 8 March 1946, MacLeish was struck from the Navy list 13 November, sold 18 December to Boston Metals Company, Baltimore, Maryland, and scrapped.

== Convoys escorted ==
Convoy	Escort Group	Dates	Notes
HX 153		7-13 Oct 1941	from Newfoundland to Iceland prior to US declaration of war
ON 28		25Oct-3 Nov 1941	from Iceland to Newfoundland prior to US declaration of war
HX 161		23 Nov-3 Dec 1941	from Newfoundland to Iceland prior to US declaration of war
ON 43		11-15 Dec 1941	from Iceland to Newfoundland
SC 70		20 Feb-3 March 1942	from Newfoundland to Northern Ireland
ON 75		11–19 March 1942	from Northern Ireland to Newfoundland
ON 148		11-28 Nov 1942	Iceland shuttle

== Awards ==
MacLeish received one battle star for her World War II service.

As of 2019, no other ships have been named MacLeish.
