= Panic (play) =

1935 verse play by Archibald MacLeish

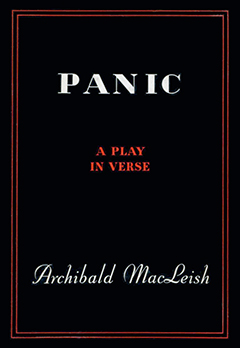
- First edition (1935)
- Original language: English
- Written by: Archibald MacLeish
- Subject: Great Depression
- Genre: Drama

Premiere
- Date: March 14, 1935
- Place: Imperial Theatre, Manhattan, New York City

Panic is a 1935 verse play by Archibald MacLeish. A tragedy that is one of the author's least-known works, it was written during the sixth year of the Great Depression. The drama is set during the bank panic of 1933 and concerns the fall of the world's richest man, a banker named McGafferty. First presented March 14–16, 1935, at the Imperial Theatre in Manhattan, the production featured Orson Welles's first leading performance on the American stage. Panic was produced by John Houseman and Nathan Zatkin as the first project of their new Phoenix Theatre. Sets and lighting were designed by Jo Mielziner; Martha Graham directed the movements of the chorus.

== Production ==
Panic, one of the least-known works of Archibald MacLeish, is a verse play written in the form of a Greek tragedy. It was his first work produced on the stage, written after his return to the United States after living eight or nine years with his family in France. He was happy to find a job at Fortune magazine, one that was flexible enough to allow him to continue his writing.

"I wrote Panic because I was living through that bloody Depression and I began to have rather chilling thoughts about it," MacLeish recalled some 50 years later:

When you talk about it now it apparently conveys nothing. I know of no one in the younger generation who has the faintest idea what the Depression was. They think it was a hard time and so forth. It was murderous. For awhile I lived outside the city. I dreaded coming home, because as I approached Grand Central Station, I would pass well-dressed young men more or less my age. Every now and then I saw friends of mine from Yale, selling lead pencils, and with an expression of shame on their faces. They had no name for shame, but they felt it. The city was full of that whole sense.

Rejected by the Theatre Guild, Jed Harris and others, MacLeish took the play to producer John Houseman, who was setting himself apart by perversely cultivating a reputation for taking on noncommercial or difficult-to-stage plays. Houseman was able to rent the Imperial Theatre—"the most desirable musical-comedy stage in New York"—for ten days, and persuaded Jo Mielziner to work without payment in creating the set and lighting. To the 25 speaking parts called for in the script, Houseman added a chorus of 23 and persuaded Martha Graham to direct their movement.

Casting the leading role of McGafferty, a 60-year-old financier modeled on J. P. Morgan, was difficult. Paul Muni was approached but then, to the exasperation of MacLeish, Houseman offered the part to a young actor he had seen playing Tybalt in Katherine Cornell's production of Romeo and Juliet — 19-year-old Orson Welles. His reading the following day put the author's doubts to rest, Houseman wrote: "Hearing that voice for the first time in its full and astonishing range, MacLeish stared incredulously. It was an instrument of pathos and terror, of infinite delicacy and brutally devastating power."

The play was presented at the Imperial Theatre on the evenings of March 14 and 15, 1935. James Light of the Provincetown Players was director. A third performance was scheduled March 16 when the magazines New Theatre and The New Masses bought out the house at a cost of $1,000 and offered a panel discussion on the stage after the show. MacLeish was cross-examined in a debate with three intellectual voices from the left, and allayed any suspicions that he had become a Marxist.

On March 22, 1935, Welles made his debut on the CBS Radio series The March of Time, performing a scene from Panic for a news report on the stage production He continued to work as a member of the radio show's repertory cast for three years. In April 1937 Welles was the Voice of the Announcer in the CBS broadcast of MacLeish's The Fall of the City, the first American verse play written for radio.

== Cast ==
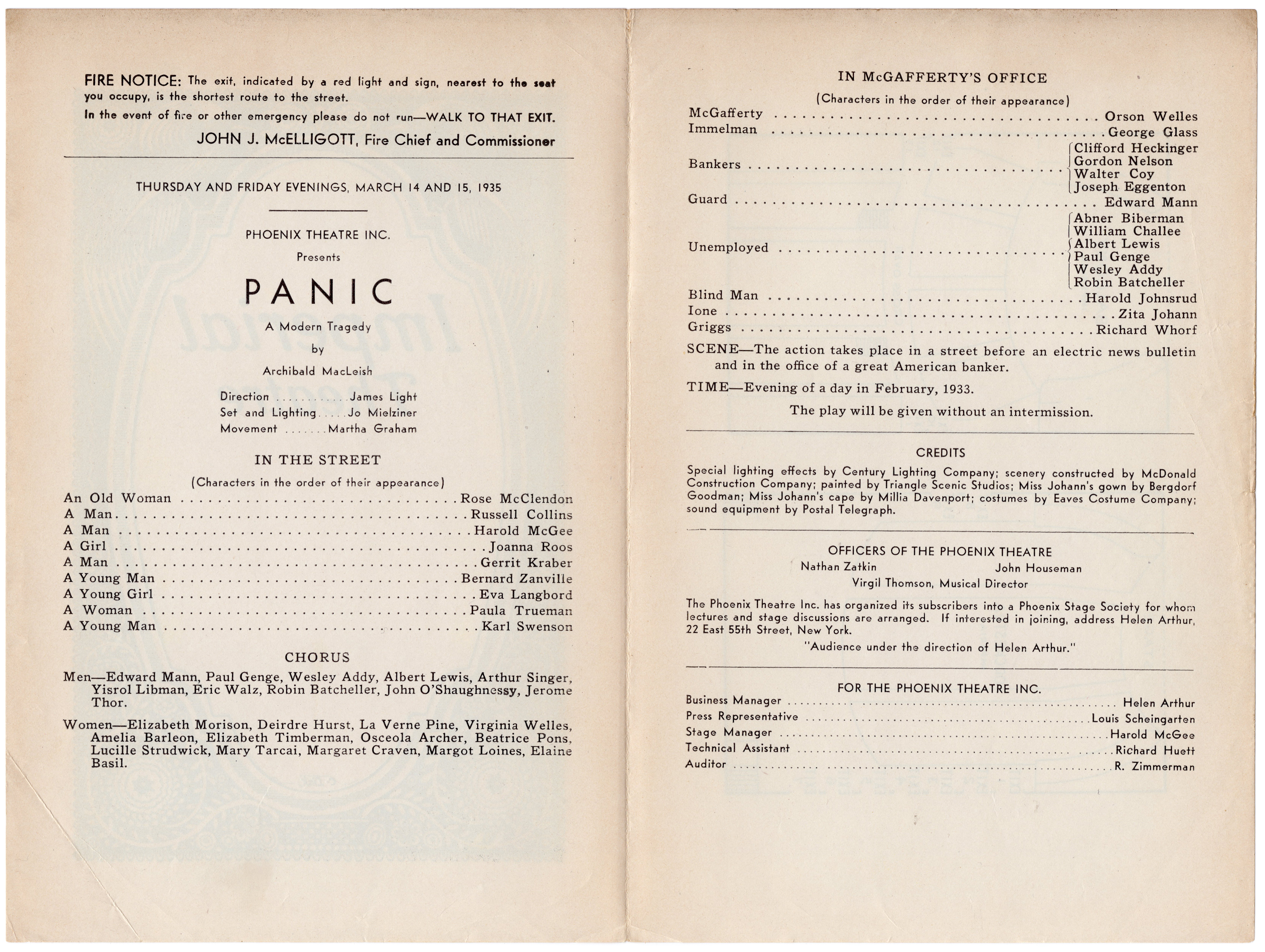
Playbill for Panic (March 14–15, 1935)

Members of the original cast are listed in order of appearance in the Imperial Theatre playbill of March 14–15, 1935.

=== In the Street ===
- Rose McClendon … An Old Woman
- Russell Collins … A Man
- Harold McGee … A Man
- Joanna Roos … A Girl
- Garrit Kraber … A Man
- Bernard Zanville … A Young Man
- Eva Langbord … A Young Girl
- Paula Trueman … A Woman
- Karl Swenson … A Young Man

==== Chorus ====
- Men — Edward Mann, Paul Genge, Wesley Addy, Albert Lewis, Arthur Singer, Yisrol Libman, Eric Walz, Robin Batcheller, John O'Shaughnessy, Jerome Thor
- Women — Elizabeth Morison, Deirdre Hurst, LaVerne Pine, Virginia Welles, Amelia Barleon, Elizabeth Timberman, Osceola Archer, Beatrice Pons, Lucille Strudwick, Mary Tarcai, Margaret Craven, Margot Loines, Elaine Basil

=== In McGafferty's Office ===
- Orson Welles … McGafferty
- George Glass … Immelman

==== Bankers ====
- Clifford Heckinger
- Gordon Nelson
- Walter Coy
- Joseph Eggenton
- Edward Mann … Guard

==== Unemployed ====
- Abner Biberman
- William Challee
- Albert Lewis
- Paul Genge
- Wesley Addy
- Robin Batcheller
- Harold Johnsrud … Blind Man
- Zita Johann … Ione
- Richard Whorf … Griggs

== Revival ==
Panic was revived in 1980, the first production of the play in the United States since its premiere in 1935. Produced by the American Branch of International Artists and directed by Marilyn Tobin, the play was presented in the town square of Greenfield, Massachusetts, with its 1929 Art Deco-style First National Bank and Trust Building as the staging area. New music was composed by Elizabeth Swados in collaboration with Tobin and the show's musical director, Ray Vakel.
