= Iona McLeish =

British theatre designer and author

- Education: Wimbledon College of Arts
- Occupation: Performance Designer
- Website: cargocollective.com/ionamcleish

Iona McLeish is a British theatre designer and costume designer.

== Biography ==
McLeish studied Theatre Design at Wimbledon School of Art under Richard Negri graduating with a 2:1 BA in Theatre Design. She worked immediately as assistant to designer Bruno Santini on operas. She designed for a Theatre in Education touring production for the Welsh Opera and Drama Company of Sir Gawain and the Green Knight. Her productions include: Women of TroyEuripides, Olivier Theatre Royal National Theatre, directed by Annie Castledine The Love of the Nightingale Timberlake Wertenbaker RSC Barbican Pit Directed by Garry Hynes India Song Marguerite Duras at Theatr Clwyd Mold, co-directed by Annie Castledine and Annabel Arden Woyzeck by Brecht, Half Moon Theatre Alie Street, directed by Rob Walker, Hamlet by Shakespeare, Half Moon Theatre, Mile End, directed by Rob Walker, and with Frances de la Tour as Hamlet. The Resistible Rise of Arturo Ui by Brecht, directed by Rob Walker, Half Moon Alie Street with Simon Callow as Ui. Heresies by Deborah Levy RSC, Barbican Pit, directed Lily Susan Todd. Received a London Theatre Award for Best Design.

McLeish designed a production of The Caretaker by Harold Pinter at the Sherman Theatre in Cardiff directed by Annie Castledine.

In 1993, at the Young Vic Theatre, McLeish designed From the Mississippi Delta by Endesha Ida Mae Holland. In 2010, at the Arcola Theatre she designed Thomas Bernhard's last play Heldenplatz

Platonov, Sons Without Fathers, by Chekhov, a co-production with Belgrade Theatre Coventry and Arcola Theatre London, adapted and directed by Helena Kaut Howson.

McLeish has also been costume designer and assistant costume designer for films and TV programmes. Her work has also included teaching and lecturing in theatre design at many BA Programmes (London College of Fashion, Wimbledon College of Art, Central St Martins) She served as head of the BA programme in Theatre Design at the London drama school Rose Bruford College. for some 15 years. From 2007 to 2011 she was Joint Honorary Secretary of the Society of British Theatre Designers (SBTD) She has exhibited her work at SBTD national exhibitions including Collaborators: UK Design for Performance 2003–2007 ISBN 978-0-9529309-4-5; 2011. Transformation & Revelation UK Design for Performance 2007-2011 ISBN 978 - 0 - 9529309 - 5 - 2 Make: Believe - UK Design for Performance 2011 – 2015
