= Polly Irvin =

British actor and theatre director

Polly Irvin is a British Time Out award-winning theatre director, actress and author, and former head of the BA programme in theatre directing at London drama school Rose Bruford College.

== Career ==
Irvin trained as an actress at Central School of Speech and Drama in London, and upon graduating worked as an actress in theatre and television for nearly a decade before turning to directing. She acted in several productions of Les Liaisons Dangereuses by the Royal Shakespeare Company from 1986 to 1991. Her TV appearances include in The Bill, Casualty, and Peak Practice.

She founded Wild Iris theatre company in 1992, for which she directed theatre productions at the Bristol Old Vic theatre, the Tricycle Theatre (including An African Audition for Europe and The Basset Table), the Bush Theatre and the Battersea Arts Centre. In 1994 she directed a production of Oedipus and The Haunted House in a double bill for Fin de Siècle Theatre Company at Bridge Lane Theatre in London. As a freelance director she directed Shakespeare's As You Like It at the Bristol Old Vic and West Yorkshire Playhouse, and devised adaptation of Hansel and Gretel for the Lyric Hammersmith in London.

In 2002, Irvin published her first book, Directing for the Stage, a series of interviews with contemporary theatre directors including Deborah Warner, Robert Lepage and Trevor Nunn.
