= Andrew MacLeish =

Scottish-American businessman (1838–1928)

Andrew MacLeish (June 26, 1838 – January 14, 1928) was a Scottish and American businessman.

== Life and career ==
MacLeish was born in Glasgow, Scotland, to Agnes (Lindsay of Clan Lindsay, born 1812) and Archibald MacLeish of Clan Macpherson (born 1809).

He received his education at the Glasgow Normal Academy, Hardy's English Academy and Flint's Commercial Academy. He worked in Glasgow and London in 1855 and 1856. That same year, he immigrated to the United States, settling in Chicago. He spent six years as an employee of J. D. Sherman and J. G. Shay and was a member of J. B. Shay & Co. from 1864 to 1866. In 1867, he joined Carson, Pirie Scott & Co. and established the firm's retail department store. Along with John D. Rockefeller, MacLeish was a co-founder of the University of Chicago. He remained head of the store until his death in 1928.

MacLeish's great-grandson by his second wife is Bruce Dern (b. 1936), an American film actor, and his great-great-granddaughter is actress Laura Dern (b. 1967).

His third wife was Martha Hillard. They married on August 2, 1888 and had two daughters and three sons, including Norman Hillard MacLeish, married to Lenore Ada McCall. Their son, Archibald became Librarian of Congress. Another son, Kenneth, was an officer in the United States Navy during World War I. A Naval aviator, he received the Navy Cross posthumously for his combat actions.

MacLeish died in Glencoe, Illinois.

Archibald MacLeish, in writing of his father, said: "My father came from a very old country in the north and far away, and he belonged to an old strange race, the race older than any other. He did not talk of his country, but he sang bits of old songs with words that he said no one could understand anymore."
