= Adam McLeish =

British snowboarder

Personal information
- Born: Pointe-Claire, 7 June 1979 (age 46)
- Height: 183 cm (6 ft 0 in)
- Spouse: Caroline Calvé

Sport
- Country: Great Britain
- Sport: Snowboarding
- Event: Parallel Giant Slalom
- Club: Scottish Ski Club

Achievements and titles
- Olympic finals: 24th (Parallel Giant Slalom, 2010)

Adam McLeish (born 7 June 1979) is a British sportsman who specializes in snowboarding. He competed at the 2010 Winter Olympic Games in the "Men's Parallel Giant Slalom" and came 24th with a total time of 1:21.09.
