= Kenneth MacLeish =

Recipient of the Navy Cross

- Born: September 19, 1894; Glencoe, Illinois, U.S.
- Died: October 15, 1918 (aged 24) near Schore, Belgium
- Burial place: Flanders Field American Cemetery, Waregem, Belgium
- Military career
- Allegiance: United States
- Branch: United States Navy
- Rank: Lieutenant
- Conflicts: First World War
- Awards: Navy Cross

Lieutenant Kenneth MacLeish, USNRF (September 19, 1894 – October 15, 1918) was a Naval aviator during World War I.

== Biography ==
Born in Glencoe, Illinois. His father, Scottish-born Andrew MacLeish, worked as a dry-goods merchant and was a founder of the Chicago department store Carson Pirie Scott. His mother, Martha (née Hillard), was a college professor and had served as president of Rockford College.

MacLeish was one of the twenty-eight original volunteers in the First Yale Unit, which he joined as a navy electrician, 2nd class, on 26 March 1917. He was appointed as an ensign in the Naval Reserve Flying Corps 31 August 1917, promoted to lieutenant junior grade on 1 June 1918, and to lieutenant in mid-August of the same year. MacLeish was the brother of Pulitzer Prize-winning poet Archibald MacLeish, and like him, attended Yale College. A member of the class of 1918, he left school to serve in the war. The young officer wrote home constantly, and his letters show the youthful enthusiasm and subsequent weariness of combat that is characteristic of men at war. In France, he participated in many raids over the enemy's lines before he was transferred in September 1918 to Eastleigh, England.

On a raid with the Royal Air Force 14 October, his plane, a Sopwith Camel, was shot down and Lieutenant MacLeish was forced to crash-land near Schore, Belgium; he was found dead the following day. MacLeish was initially buried where he fell, reinterred at the Lyssenthoek Military Cemetery in June 1919, and finally buried at the Flanders Field American Cemetery in Waregem, Belgium at plot B, row 4, grave 1.

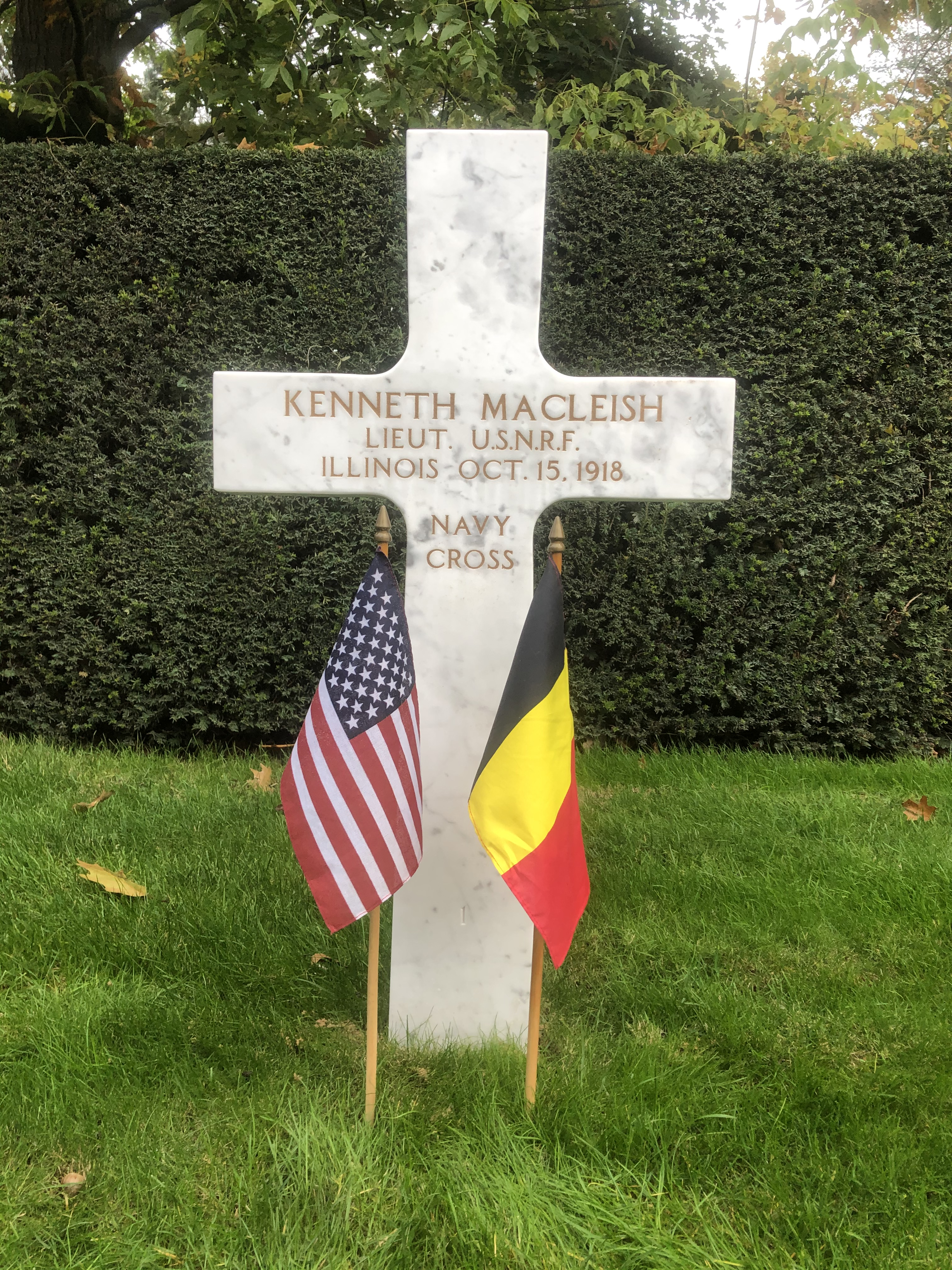
Lieutenant Kenneth MacLeish's headstone at the Flanders Field American Cemetery.

He was posthumously awarded the Navy Cross for his actions. His citation reads, "The Navy Cross is awarded to Lieutenant Kenneth MacLeish, U.S. Navy, for distinguished and heroic service as a pilot attached to the U. S. Naval Aviation Force in the war zone. Lieutenant MacLeish took part in operations against the enemy forces on land and was shot down and killed in the drive in Flanders during October, 1918." The destroyer USS MacLeish (DD-220) was named for him. Kenneth MacLeish's sister, Ishbel, went to Philadelphia at the request of Josephus Daniels, Secretary of the Navy, on 18 December 1919 and sponsored the ship at the launching.
