= Archibald MacLeish =

American poet and 9th Librarian of Congress (1892–1982)

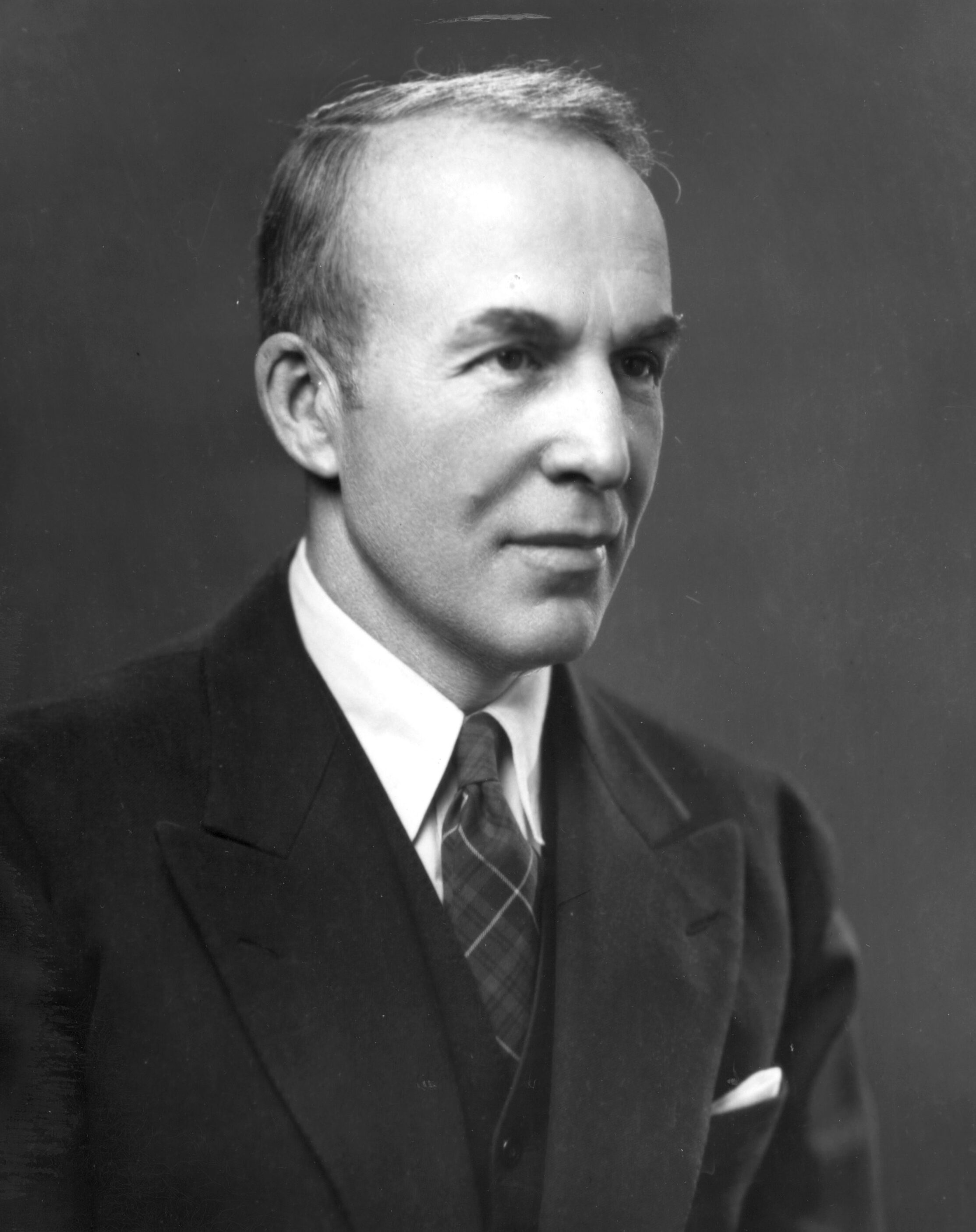

Assistant Secretary of State for Public and Cultural Relations
- In office December 20, 1944 – August 17, 1945
- President: Franklin D. Roosevelt; Harry S. Truman
- Preceded by: Position established
- Succeeded by: William Benton

Librarian of Congress
- In office July 10, 1939 – December 19, 1944
- President: Franklin D. Roosevelt
- Preceded by: Herbert Putnam
- Succeeded by: Luther H. Evans

Personal details
- Born: May 7, 1892 Glencoe, Illinois, U.S.
- Died: April 20, 1982 (aged 89) Boston, Massachusetts, U.S.
- Relatives: Kenneth MacLeish (brother)
- Education: Yale University (BA); Harvard University (LLB)
- Writing career
- Genres: Poetry, drama, essays
- Notable works: Panic (1935); J.B. (1958)

Archibald MacLeish (May 7, 1892 – April 20, 1982) was an American poet and writer, who was associated with the modernist school of poetry. MacLeish studied English at Yale University and law at Harvard University. He enlisted in and saw action during the First World War and lived in Paris in the 1920s. On returning to the United States, he contributed to Henry Luce's magazine Fortune from 1929 to 1938. For five years, MacLeish was the ninth Librarian of Congress, a post he accepted at the urging of President Franklin D. Roosevelt. From 1949 to 1962, he was Boylston Professor of Rhetoric and Oratory at Harvard. He was awarded three Pulitzer Prizes for his work.

== Early years ==
MacLeish was born on May 7, 1892, in Glencoe, Illinois. His father, Scottish-born Andrew MacLeish, worked as a dry-goods merchant and was a founder of the Chicago department store Carson Pirie Scott. His mother, Martha (née Hillard), was a college professor and had served as president of Rockford College. He grew up on an estate bordering Lake Michigan. He attended the Hotchkiss School from 1907 to 1911. For his college education, MacLeish went to Yale University, where he majored in English, was elected to Phi Beta Kappa, and was selected for the Skull and Bones society. He then enrolled in Harvard Law School, where he served as an editor of the Harvard Law Review.

His studies were interrupted by World War I, in which he served first as an ambulance driver and later as an artillery officer. He fought at the Second Battle of the Marne. His brother, Kenneth MacLeish, was killed in action during the war. He graduated from law school in 1919, taught law for a semester for the government department at Harvard, then worked briefly as an editor for The New Republic. He next spent three years practicing law with the Boston firm Choate, Hall & Stewart. MacLeish expressed his disillusion with war in his poem Memorial Rain, published in 1926.

== Years in Paris ==
In 1923, MacLeish left his law firm and moved with his wife to Paris, where they joined the community of literary expatriates that included such members as Gertrude Stein and Ernest Hemingway. They also became part of the famed coterie of Riviera hosts Gerald and Sarah Murphy, which included Hemingway, Zelda and F. Scott Fitzgerald, John Dos Passos, Fernand Léger, Jean Cocteau, Pablo Picasso, John O'Hara, Cole Porter, Dorothy Parker, and Robert Benchley. He returned to America in 1928. From 1930 to 1938, he worked as a writer and editor for Henry Luce's Fortune, during which he also became increasingly politically active, especially with antifascist causes. By the 1930s, he considered capitalism to be "symbolically dead" and wrote the verse play Panic (1935) in response.

While in Paris, Harry Crosby, publisher of the Black Sun Press, offered to publish MacLeish's poetry. Both MacLeish and Crosby had overturned the normal expectations of society, rejecting conventional careers in the legal and banking fields. Crosby published MacLeish's long poem "Einstein" in a deluxe edition of 150 copies that sold quickly. MacLeish was paid $200 for his work. In 1932, MacLeish published his long poem "Conquistador", which presents Cortés's conquest of the Aztecs as symbolic of the American experience. In 1933, "Conquistador" was awarded a Pulitzer Prize, the first of three awarded to MacLeish.

In 1934, he wrote a libretto for Union Pacific, a ballet by Nicolas Nabokov and Léonide Massine (Ballet Russe de Monte-Carlo); it premiered in Philadelphia with great success.

In 1938, MacLeish published as a book a long poem "Land of the Free", built around a series of 88 photographs of the rural depression by Dorothea Lange, Walker Evans, Arthur Rothstein, Ben Shahn, and the Farm Security Administration and other agencies. The book influenced Steinbeck's The Grapes of Wrath.

== Librarian of Congress ==
American Libraries has called MacLeish "one of the 100 most influential figures in librarianship during the 20th century" in the United States. MacLeish's career in libraries and public service began, not with an internal desire, but from a combination of the urging of a close friend, Felix Frankfurter, and as MacLeish put it, "The President decided I wanted to be Librarian of Congress." Franklin D. Roosevelt's nomination of MacLeish was a controversial and highly political maneuver fraught with several challenges.

MacLeish sought support from expected places such as the president of Harvard, MacLeish's current place of work, but found none. Support from unexpected places, such as M. Llewellyn Raney of the University of Chicago libraries, alleviated the ALA letter-writing campaign against MacLeish's nomination." The main Republican argument against MacLeish's nomination from within Congress was that he was a poet and was a "fellow traveler" or sympathetic to communist causes. Calling to mind differences with the party he had over the years, MacLeish avowed, "no one would be more shocked to learn I am a Communist than the Communists themselves." In Congress, MacLeish's main advocate was Senate Majority Leader Alben Barkley, Democrat from Kentucky. With President Roosevelt's support and Senator Barkley's skillful defense in the United States Senate, victory in a roll call vote was achieved, with 63 senators voting in favor of MacLeish's appointment. MacLeish was sworn in as Librarian of Congress on July 10, 1939, by the local postmaster at Conway, Massachusetts.

MacLeish became privy to Roosevelt's views on the library during a private meeting with the President. According to Roosevelt, the pay levels were too low and many people would need to be removed. Soon afterward, MacLeish joined the retiring Librarian of Congress Herbert Putnam for a luncheon in New York. At the meeting, Putnam relayed his intention to continue working at the library, that he would be given the title of librarian emeritus, and that his office would be down the hall from MacLeish's. The meeting further crystallized for MacLeish that as Librarian of Congress, he would be "an unpopular newcomer, disturbing the status quo."

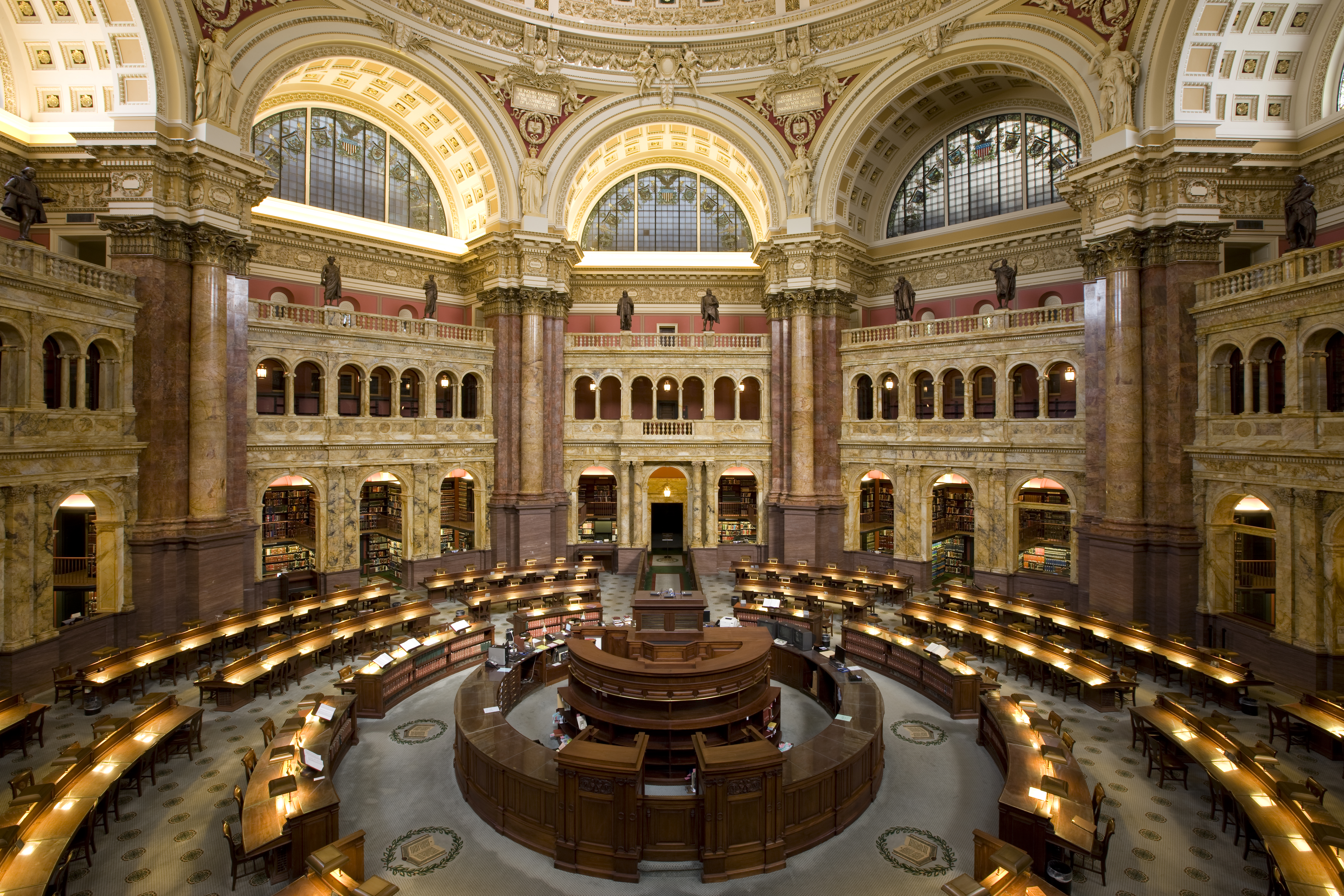
Library of Congress reading room

A question from MacLeish's daughter, Mimi, led him to realize, "Nothing is more difficult for the beginning librarian than to discover [in] what profession he was engaged." Mimi, his daughter, had inquired about what her daddy was to do all day, "...hand out books?" MacLeish created his own job description and set out to learn about how the library was currently organized. In October 1944, MacLeish described that he did not set out to reorganize the library, rather "...one problem or another demanded action, and each problem solved led on to another that needed attention."

MacLeish's chief accomplishments had their start in instituting daily staff meetings with division chiefs, the chief assistant librarian, and other administrators. He then set about setting up various committees on various projects, including acquisitions policy, fiscal operations, cataloging, and outreach. The committees alerted MacLeish to various problems throughout the library. Putnam was conspicuously not invited to attend these meetings, resulting in the librarian emeritus' feelings being "mortally hurt", but according to MacLeish, it was necessary to exclude Putnam; otherwise, "he would have been sitting there listening to talk about himself which he would take personally."

First and foremost, under Putnam, the library was acquiring more books than it could catalog. A report in December 1939, found that over one-quarter of the library's collection had not yet been cataloged. MacLeish solved the problem of acquisitions and cataloging through establishing another committee instructed to seek advice from specialists outside of the Library of Congress. The committee found many subject areas of the library to be adequate and many other areas to be, surprisingly, inadequately provided for. A set of general principles on acquisitions was then developed to ensure that, though it was impossible to collect everything, the Library of Congress would acquire the bare minimum of canons to meet its mission. These principles included acquiring all materials necessary to members of Congress and government officers, all materials expressing and recording the life and achievements of the people of the United States, and materials of other societies past and present that are of the most immediate concern to the peoples of the United States.

Secondly, MacLeish set about reorganizing the operational structure. Leading scholars in library science were assigned a committee to analyze the library's managerial structure. The committee issued a report a mere two months after it was formed, in April 1940, stating that a major restructuring was necessary. This was no surprise to MacLeish, who had 35 divisions under him. He divided the library's functions into three departments: administration, processing, and reference. All existing divisions were then assigned as appropriate. By including library scientists from inside and outside the Library of Congress, MacLeish was able to gain faith from the library community that he was on the right track. Within a year, MacLeish had completely restructured the Library of Congress, making it work more efficiently and aligning the library to "report on the mystery of things."

Last, but not least, MacLeish promoted the Library of Congress through various forms of public advocacy. Perhaps his greatest display of public advocacy was requesting a budget increase of over a million dollars in his March 1940 budget proposal to Congress. While the library did not receive the full increase, it received an increase of $367,591, the largest one-year increase to date. Much of the increase went toward improved pay levels, increased acquisitions in underserved subject areas, and new positions. MacLeish resigned as Librarian of Congress on December 19, 1944, to take up the post of Assistant Secretary of State for Public Affairs.

== World War II ==
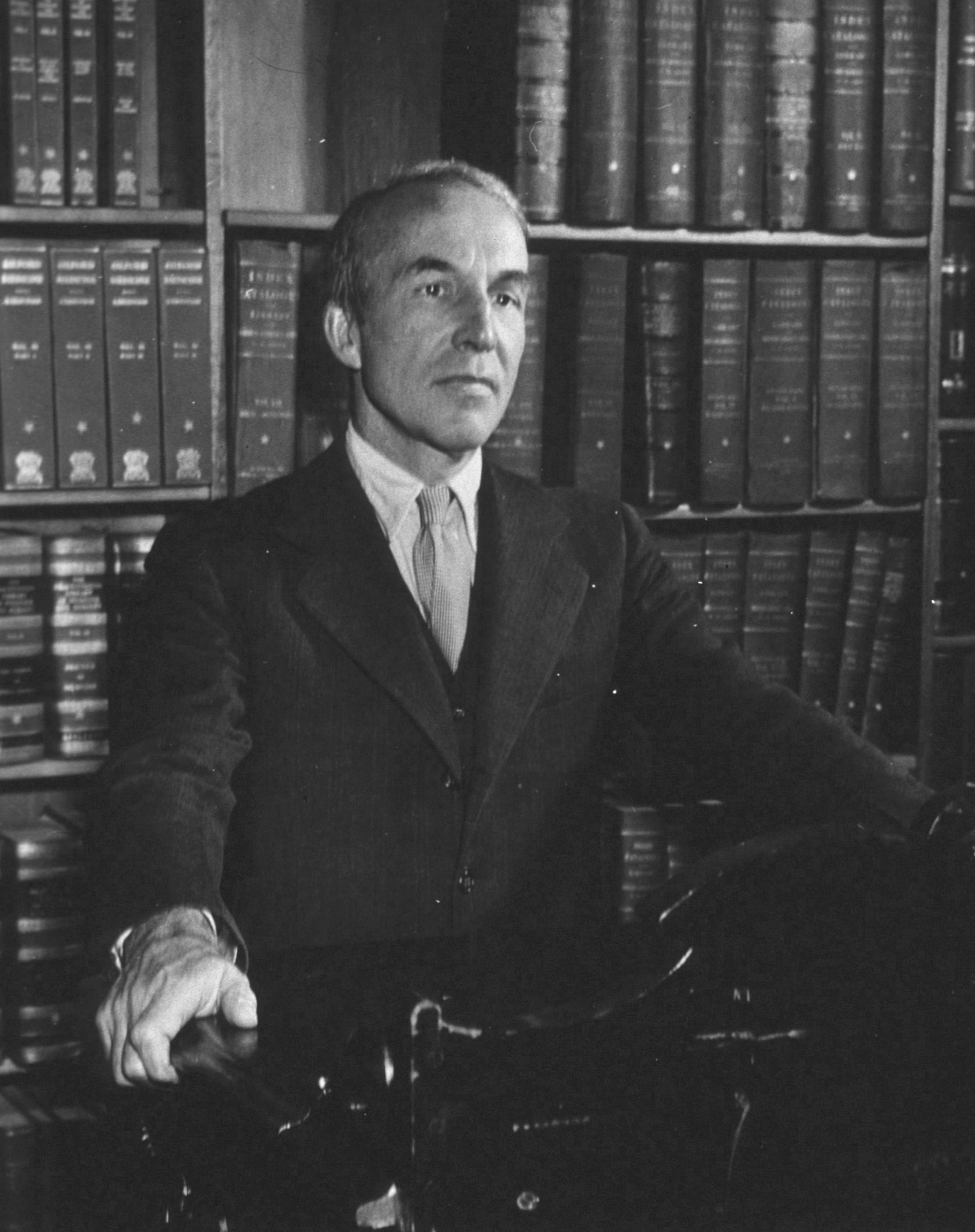
MacLeish in 1944

Archibald MacLeish also assisted with the development of the new "Research and Analysis Branch" of the Office of Strategic Services, the precursor to the Central Intelligence Agency. "These operations were overseen by the distinguished Harvard University historian William L. Langer, who, with the assistance of the American Council of Learned Societies and Librarian of Congress Archibald MacLeish, set out immediately to recruit a professional staff drawn from across the social sciences. Over the next 12 months, academic specialists from fields ranging from geography to classical philology descended upon Washington, bringing with them their most promising graduate students, and set up shop in the headquarters of the Research and Analysis (R&A) Branch at Twenty-third and E Streets, and in the new annex to the Library of Congress."

During World War II, MacLeish also served as director of the War Department's Office of Facts and Figures, and as the assistant director of the Office of War Information. These jobs were heavily involved with propaganda, which was well-suited to MacLeish's talents; he had written quite a bit of politically motivated work in the previous decade. He spent a year as the Assistant Secretary of State for Public Affairs and a further year representing the U.S. at the creation of UNESCO, where he contributed to the preamble of its 1945 Constitution ("Since wars begin in the minds of men, it is in the minds of men that the defenses of peace must be constructed."). After this, he retired from public service and returned to academia.

== Return to writing ==
Despite a long history of debate over the merits of Marxism, MacLeish came under fire from anticommunists in the 1940s and 1950s, including J. Edgar Hoover and Joseph McCarthy. Much of this was due to his involvement with left-wing organizations such as the League of American Writers, and to his friendships with prominent left-wing writers. Time magazine's Whittaker Chambers cited him as a fellow traveler in a 1941 article: "By 1938, U. S. Communists could count among their allies such names as Granville Hicks, Newton Arvin, Waldo Frank, Lewis Mumford, Matthew Josephson, Kyle Crichton (Robert Forsythe), Malcolm Cowley, Donald Ogden Stewart, Erskine Caldwell, Dorothy Parker, Archibald MacLeish, Lillian Hellman, Dashiell Hammett, John Steinbeck, George Soule, many another."

In 1949, MacLeish became the Boylston Professor of Rhetoric and Oratory at Harvard University. He held this position until his retirement in 1962. In 1959, his play J.B. won the Pulitzer Prize for Drama. From 1963 to 1967, he was the John Woodruff Simpson Lecturer at Amherst College. In 1969, MacLeish met Bob Dylan, and asked him to contribute songs to Scratch, a musical MacLeish was writing, based on the story "The Devil and Daniel Webster" by Stephen Vincent Benét. The collaboration was a failure and Scratch opened without any music; Dylan describes their collaboration in the third chapter of his autobiography Chronicles, Vol. 1.

MacLeish greatly admired T. S. Eliot and Ezra Pound, and his work shows quite a bit of their influence. He was the literary figure who played the most important role in Ezra Pound’s release from St. Elizabeths Hospital in Washington, D.C., where he was held between 1946 and 1958, after being found unfit to stand trial for high treason. MacLeish's early work was very traditionally modernist and accepted the contemporary modernist position holding that a poet was isolated from society. His most well-known poem, "Ars Poetica," contains a classic statement of the modernist aesthetic: "A poem should not mean / But be." He later broke with modernism's pure aesthetic. MacLeish himself was greatly involved in public life and came to believe that this was not only an appropriate, but also an inevitable role for a poet.

In 1969, MacLeish was commissioned by The New York Times to write a poem to celebrate the Apollo 11 Moon landing, which he entitled "Voyage to the Moon." The poem appeared on the front page of the July 21, 1969 edition of The New York Times. A. M. Rosenthal, then-editor of theTimes, later recounted: "We decided what the front page of Time would need when the men landed was a poem. What the poet wrote would count most, but we also wanted to say to our readers, look, this paper does not know how to express how it feels this day and perhaps you don't either, so here is a fellow, a poet, who will try for all of us. We called one poet who just did not think much of moons or us, and then decided to reach higher for somebody with more zest in his soul – for Archibald MacLeish, winner of three Pulitzer Prizes. He turned in his poem on time and entitled it 'Voyage to the Moon.'"

== Legacy ==
MacLeish worked to promote the arts, culture, and libraries. Among other impacts, MacLeish was the first Librarian of Congress to begin the process of naming what would become the United States Poet Laureate. The Poet Laureate Consultant in Poetry to the Library of Congress came from a donation in 1937 from Archer M. Huntington, a wealthy ship builder. Like many donations, it came with strings attached. In this case, Huntington wanted poet Joseph Auslander to be named to the position. MacLeish found little value in Auslander's writing. However, MacLeish was happy that having Auslander in the post attracted many other poets, such as Robinson Jeffers and Robert Frost, to hold readings at the library. He set about establishing the consultantship as a revolving post rather than a lifetime position. In 1943, MacLeish displayed his love of poetry and the Library of Congress by naming Louise Bogan to the position. Bogan, who had long been a hostile critic of MacLeish's own writing, asked MacLeish why he appointed her to the position; MacLeish replied that she was the best person for the job. For MacLeish, promoting the Library of Congress and the arts was vitally more important than petty personal conflicts.

In the June 5, 1972, issue of The American Scholar, MacLeish laid out in an essay his philosophy on libraries and librarianship, further shaping modern thought on the subject:

No true book [...] was ever anything else than a report. [...] A true book is a report upon the mystery of existence [...] it speaks of the world, of our life in the world. Everything we have in the books on which our libraries are founded—Euclid's figures, Leonardo's notes, Newton's explanations, Cervantes' myth, Sappho's broken songs, the vast surge of Homer—everything is a report of one kind or another and the sum of all of them together is our little knowledge of our world and of ourselves. Call a book Das Kapital or The Voyage of the Beagle or Theory of Relativity or Alice in Wonderland or Moby Dick, it is still [...] a "report" upon the "mystery of things." But if this is what a book is [...], then a library [...] is an extraordinary thing. [...] The existence of a library is, in itself, an assertion. [...] It asserts that [...] all these different and dissimilar reports, these bits and pieces of experience, manuscripts in bottles, messages from long before, from deep within, from miles beyond, belonged together and might, if understood together, spell out the meaning which the mystery implies. [...] The library, almost alone of the great monuments of civilization, stands taller now than it ever did before. The city [...] decays. The nation loses its grandeur [...]. The university is not always certain what it is. But the library remains: a silent and enduring affirmation that the great Reports still speak, and not alone but somehow all together [...]

Two collections of MacLeish's papers are held at the Yale University Beinecke Rare Book and Manuscript Library. These are the Archibald MacLeish Collection and the Archibald MacLeish Collection Addition. Additionally, more than 13,500 items from his papers and his personal library are held in the Archibald MacLeish Collection at Greenfield Community College in Greenfield, Massachusetts. Smith College's MacLeish Field Station is named after MacLeish and his wife Ada, who were close friends of former Smith president Jill Ker Conway and introduced her to the natural environment around Northampton, Massachusetts.

== Personal life ==
In 1916, he married Ada Hitchcock, a musician. MacLeish had three children: Kenneth, Mary Hillard, and William, the author of a memoir of his father, Uphill with Archie (2001). He died in 1982, at the age of 89.

== Awards and honors ==
- 1933: Pulitzer Prize for Poetry (Conquistador )
- 1946: Commandeur de la Legion d'honneur
- 1950: elected to the American Academy of Arts and Sciences
- 1953: Pulitzer Prize for Poetry (Collected Poems 1917–1952)
- 1953: National Book Award for Poetry (Collected Poems, 1917–1952)
- 1953: Bollingen Prize in Poetry
- 1959: Pulitzer Prize for Drama (J.B.)
- 1959: Tony Award for Best Play (J.B.)
- 1976: elected to the American Philosophical Society
- 1977: Presidential Medal of Freedom

== Works ==
=== Poetry collections ===
- Class Poem (1915)
- Songs for a Summer's Day (1915)
- Tower of Ivory (1917)
- The Happy Marriage (1924)
- The Pot of Earth (1925)
- Nobodaddy (1926)
- Streets in the Moon (1926)
- The Hamlet of A. Macleish (1928)
- Einstein (1929)
- New Found Land (1930)
- Conquistador (1932)
- Elpenor (1933)
- Frescoes for Mr. Rockefeller's City (1933)
- Poems, 1924–1933 (1935)
- Public Speech (1936)
- The Land of the Free (1938)
- Actfive and Other Poems (1948)
- Collected Poems (1952)
- Songs for Eve (1954)
- The Collected Poems of Archibald MacLeish (1962)
- The Wild Old Wicked Man and Other Poems (1968)
- The Human Season, Selected Poems 1926–1972 (1972)
- New and Collected Poems, 1917–1976 (1976)

=== Prose ===
- Jews in America (1936)
- America Was Promises (1939)
- The Irresponsibles: A Declaration (1940)
- The American Cause (1941)
- A Time to Speak (1941)
- American Opinion and the War: the Rede Lecture (1942)
- A Time to Act: Selected Addresses (1943)
- Freedom Is the Right to Choose (1951)
- Art Education and the Creative Process (1954)
- Poetry and Experience (1961)
- The Dialogues of Archibald MacLeish and Mark Van Doren (1964)
- The Eleanor Roosevelt Story (1965)
- A Continuing Journey (1968)
- Champion of a Cause: Essays and Addresses on Librarianship (1971)
- Poetry and Opinion: the Pisan Cantos of Ezra Pound (1974)
- Riders on the Earth: Essays & Recollections (Houghton Mifflin, 1978) ISBN 9780395263822
- Letters of Archibald MacLeish, 1907–1982 (Houghton Mifflin, 1983) ISBN 9780395321591

=== Drama ===
- Union Pacific (ballet) (1934)
- Panic (1935)
- The Fall of the City (1937)
- Air Raid: A Verse Play for Radio (1938)
- Colloquy for the States (1943)
- The American Story: Ten Broadcasts (1944)
- The Trojan Horse (1952)
- This Music Crept By Me on the Waters (1953)
- J.B. (1958)
- Three Short Plays: The Secret of Freedom. Air Raid. The Fall of the City. (1961)
- An Evening's Journey to Conway (1967)
- Herakles (1967)
- Scratch (1971)
- Magic Prison: the Poetry of Emily Dickinson (1975)
- The Great American Fourth of July Parade (University of Pittsburgh Press, 1975) ISBN 9780822933007
- Six Plays (1980)

== See also ==
- List of ambulance drivers during World War I

== Notes ==
Government offices
New office	Assistant Secretary of State for Public Affairs; 1944–1945	Succeeded by William Benton
