= Runesson =

Runesson is a surname. Notable people with the surname include:

- Albin Runesson (born 1996), Swedish ice hockey defenceman
- Carin Runesson (born 1947), Swedish social democratic politician, member of the Riksdag since 2006
- Eric M. Runesson (born 1960), Swedish lawyer, member of the Swedish Academy and Justice of the Supreme Court of Sweden
- Johan Runesson (born 1990), Swedish orienteering competitor, World and Junior World Champion
- Lotta Runesson, Swedish football midfielder

== See also ==
- Renison (disambiguation)
- Ronson (disambiguation)
