= Ronson =

Ronson may refer to:

== People ==
- Barbara Ronson (1942–2018), British Liberal Democrat politician
- Billy Ronson (1957–2015), English footballer
- Charlotte Ronson (born 1977), English fashion designer in New York
- Gail Ronson (born 1946), British philanthropist
- Gerald Ronson (born 1939), British businessman
- Jesse Ronson (born 1985), Canadian mixed martial artist
- Jon Ronson (born 1967), journalist, documentary filmmaker, radio presenter and author
- Len Ronson (1936–2014), Canadian professional ice hockey winger
- Mark Ronson (born 1975), English musician, DJ, singer, songwriter and record producer
- Mick Ronson (1946–1993), English guitarist, songwriter, multi-instrumentalist, arranger, and producer
- Peter Ronson (1934–2007), born Pétur Rögnvaldsson, Icelandic-born athlete and actor
- Samantha Ronson (born 1977), English DJ and singer-songwriter

== Other uses ==
- M4 Sherman, American tank used during World War II allegedly nicknamed Ronson
- Ronson (company)
- Ronson flamethrower
- Ronson system
