= Anthony Parnes =

English businessman convicted of fraud

- Born: Anthony Keith Parnes; 1944 or 1945 (age 80–81)
- Occupation: ex-Stockbroker
- Known for: One of "the Guinness Four"
- Spouse: Denise Ratner (divorced)
- Relatives: Gerald Ratner (brother-in-law)

Anthony Keith Parnes (born 1945) is an English ex-stockbroker, who was convicted and jailed with Ernest Saunders, Gerald Ronson, and Jack Lyons in the Guinness share-trading fraud of the 1980s; they collectively became known as "the Guinness Four". He was sentenced to two-and-a-half years on charges of false accounting and theft.

The son of a London gown manufacturer, Parnes started his working life as an office boy with a stockbroker. Working in the stock exchange as a 'blue button' at A. J. Bekhore, he established a reputation for dealing with the big players of the fringe banking world. His colleagues nicknamed him "The Animal".

Parnes built up the strategic shareholding in Debenhams for Ronson and Sir Philip Harris during Burton's fiercely contested bid for the department store group. That stake helped win the bid for Sir Ralph Halpern, Burton's chairman, in a cliffhanging finish. The vote went in favour of Burton after the bid had been extended from the 3 pm Friday deadline to the following Sunday in a special dispensation by the Takeover Panel. After working at stockbrokers A.J. Bekhor, Rowe Rudd and McNally, he became a "half commission" man (that is, an introducing broker) with Alexander Laing and Cruickshank. As well as having dealt for various clients, Parnes' relations include the former chief executive of the major British jewellery company Ratners Group Gerald Ratner and the restaurateur and club-owner Richard Caring.

== The Guinness Case ==
Parnes and others had manipulated the Guinness share price to enable it to merge favourably with Distillers. Described as "flamboyant" by The Scotsman, he was sentenced to two-and-a-half years on charges of false accounting and theft, but had his sentence reduced to 21 months on appeal.

Parnes' case was that a reasonable man with experience in the City would not at the time have regarded what he did as dishonest. Guinness shares did not reach a price higher than he thought was justified. He did not accept he had any responsibility to make disclosure to the Stock Exchange. He claimed the payments he received were for lawful and valuable services. He also claimed he was not told that the arrangements he made for Guinness plc had not been sanctioned by its board of directors.

Appeals by the Guinness four in 1991 and 1995 resulted in their sentences being reduced. In 1995 Michael Heseltine, the then President of the Board of Trade, lifted a government "gagging order" preventing disclosure of evidence in the appeals of defendants in the Guinness case. While this procedure was unjust, the court felt that it did not outweigh the prosecution's arguments.

The now deceased Patrick Spens, 3rd Baron Spens, a defendant in the second, Guinness II, trial, who campaigned for compensation after the charges against him were dropped, said: "We have tried for years to get the certificate lifted." He said that the Guinness appeal would make "Matrix Churchill look amateurish. In Matrix Churchill three men did not go to prison; in Guinness I, they did." He insisted that there was nothing wrong with the Guinness deal and says the DTI inspectors did not understand the rules of the takeover "game". Lord Spens said that the difference between winning and losing a takeover bid could easily be an executive's job and he said: "Takeovers are not genteel affairs, as the inspectors would have it. They are very, very serious, life and death businesses. Little has changed in the last 10 years. They are just called different names, the practices that went on in the 1980s."

== Personal life ==
Parnes was married to Denise Ratner, sister of jewellery businessman Gerald Ratner.

As a result of the Guinness case and his 17 months in prison, his marriage broke up, he was expelled from the London Stock Exchange, and left a large home in Hampstead for a small flat in central London.
