= Guinness share-trading fraud =

Major business scandal of the 1980s

The Guinness share-trading fraud was a major business scandal of the 1980s. It involved the manipulation of the London stock market to inflate the price of Guinness shares to thereby assist Guinness's £4 billion takeover bid for the Scottish drinks company Distillers. Four businessmen were convicted of criminal offences for taking part in the manipulation. The scandal was discovered in testimony given by the American stock trader Ivan Boesky as part of a plea bargain. Ernest Saunders, Gerald Ronson, Jack Lyons and Anthony Parnes, the so-called Guinness four, were charged, paid large fines and, with the exception of Lyons, who was suffering from ill health, served prison sentences. The case was brought by the Serious Fraud Office.

== Crime ==
The defendants bought shares in Guinness plc to enable Guinness (by supporting its share price) to take over Distillers, a much larger company. The Distillers board favoured Guinness as partners and were facing a hostile bid by Argyll. The Guinness executives guaranteed without limit the defendants' losses if the value of their Guinness shares dropped; this gave the defendants an unfair advantage in what should be a fair market. The prosecution relied on a new law; the defendants claimed that supporting a share price with a guarantee was an unusual but longstanding market practice.

Saunders had invested US$100 million with an American arbitrage expert, Ivan Boesky, to invest in shares; Boesky stated that the fee for managing this amount was his reward for supporting the Guinness share price. Boesky was charged in New York on another matter and mentioned this payment under questioning. This information was passed on to the DTI corporate inspectorate in London, leading to an investigation in which Saunders' other secret share price support arrangements were unveiled. It also emerged that Saunders' arrangements had not been revealed to, nor sanctioned by, the Guinness board. Saunders was said to have misdescribed this sum in Guinness's accounts, though some believed that it was properly an off-balance sheet item. At that time, $100 million was a very large percentage of Guinness's annual profits.

In total, Guinness paid $38 million to 11 companies in at least six countries to buy $300 million of Guinness stock. Half of the stock was bought by Bank Leu. Saunders had formerly been a senior executive at the Swiss firm Nestlé.

When the Distillers takeover was completed, Guinness plc also paid a £5.2 million success fee to a Guinness director, American lawyer Tom Ward, but this was paid in such a way that it was alleged that Saunders had himself been secretly paid much of the fee outside Britain by Ward. The matter was examined in Guinness plc v Saunders, a UK company law case distinct from the criminal cases, and Ward was ordered to return the fee to Guinness plc.

== Principal defendants and sentences ==
Ernest Saunders
Former Guinness chief executive. Jailed for 5 years (a sentence later halved on appeal) for false accounting, conspiracy, and theft.
Jack Lyons
Financier. Fined £4m for theft and false accounting. He was subsequently stripped of his knighthood.
Anthony Parnes
City trader. Jailed for 30 months, reduced on appeal to 21 months, for false accounting and theft.
Gerald Ronson
Businessman. Jailed for a year, and fined £5m, for false accounting, conspiracy and theft.

"Guinness One", presided over by Lord Justice Henry ended in September 1990 with guilty verdicts against all four men and jail sentences for Saunders (five years), Ronson (one year) and Parnes (two-and-a-half years). Ronson was fined £5 million and Lyons £4 million. Ronson, Parnes and Lyons were all ordered to pay £440,000 in costs.

The common factor in this case was that the alleged crimes were committed by businessmen who were outside the banking world but who had extensive financial connections to the City of London. Parnes was their link man to the transactions. The nub of the case was whether the overall arrangements and inducements went too far in distorting the market.

== Appeals ==
In May 1991, Saunders and his co-accused appealed against their convictions. The guilty verdicts were upheld, though his sentence was halved after medical evidence was produced at the Court of Appeal that suggested he was suffering from serious illness. A diagnosis of pre-senile Alzheimer's disease was accepted by the Appeal Court. Alzheimer's is an incurable, progressive degenerative disease of the brain, but Saunders subsequently made a full recovery from his medical condition. Dr Patrick Gallway, a forensic pathologist who was an expert witness at the appeal, explained in 1996 that a diagnosis for the condition is initially "very difficult" and said "so we did not make one; we expressed worries about it."

After work by lawyers for Parnes and Ronson in unearthing material about SFO investigations into other support operations, which they said should have been disclosed before the trial, a second appeal hearing was granted; the appeal court upheld the convictions.

== Secondary trial ==
The professionals accused in "Guinness Four" were Patrick, 3rd Baron Spens, at the time a director of Henry Ansbacher & Company, a bank, and previously a director of Morgan Grenfell & Co. charged with four offences; Roger Seelig, former corporate finance director at Morgan Grenfell & Co., charged with 12 offences and David Green, junior listing broker at Morgan Grenfell & Co., charged with 12 offences. Charges against David Mayhew of Cazenove, a takeover advisor, never came to trial.

The case against Spens and Seelig collapsed in 1992 and charges against Mayhew were dropped after pre-trial challenges by his lawyers. Another defendant, Ward, returned to Britain to stand trial and was acquitted of any dishonesty. Though acquitted, the defendants had to pay lawyers' fees.

== Official report ==
The Department of Trade and Industry finally released in 1998 the report of their investigation started a decade earlier. It clarified that the biggest buyer of Guinness shares to support the bid was J Rothschild Holdings, the investment group then headed by Lord Rothschild. The £28.7 million spent by his company exceeded the £25.1 million support from companies owned by Gerald Ronson, who was jailed for his role, but there was no criticism of J Rothschild. The main reason was that other supporters were paid for their help and were given indemnities against losses, but J Rothschild received no payment. The Report's inspectors said that the firm's motive was to create a favourable climate for obtaining future business from Guinness's City advisers, the stockbrokers Cazenove and the merchant bank Morgan Grenfell. Criticism of Morgan Grenfell at the time had led to several resignations including that of Morgan's chief executive Christopher Reeves.

J. Rothschild issued a statement saying it was pleased that the report had at last been published and making clear that the firm was not a party to the wrongdoings identified in the report. It read: "Guinness shares were purchased for proper commercial motives. J Rothschild was subject to no obligation to disclose the share purchases. The arrangements were, and were regarded as, perfectly normal at the time."

== Financial outcomes ==
After the takeover the Guinness plc share price increased and settled to about three times its value before the takeover. Saunders could argue that he had discharged his duty to his shareholders. While this benefited the Guinness family enormously, their percentage of shares in the reformed company dropped to about 6% and their last director retired in 1992. Guinness plc had also negotiated a compensation package in 1988 for those who owned Distillers shares at the time of the takeover, which was accepted.

Bank Leu, still reeling from its role in a massive insider trading scandal in the United States, was ultimately forced to merge with Crédit Suisse in 1990.

== Final appeals 2000–02 ==
Having had their sentences reduced on appeal, the "Guinness One" trial defendants also tried to reverse their convictions by using the 1997 DTI report and the UK Human Rights Act 1998. In 2000 the European Court of Human Rights ruled that the 1990 trial had been unfair because there had been improper collusion between the DTI inspectors and the prosecuting authorities. A further appeal to the Court of Appeal Criminal Division that sought to have the Human Rights Act 1998 applied retroactively, and claimed that the trial jury had been nobbled, failed in 2001. A final appeal to the House of Lords failed in 2002.
