= Ernest Saunders =

British former Global CEO (born 1935)

- Born: Ernest Walter Schleyer; 21 October 1935 (age 90); Austria
- Occupation: Business manager
- Known for: One of the "Guinness Four"
- Spouse: Carole Ann Stephing
- Children: Two sons and one daughter
- Status: Released after 10 months
- Criminal charges: Conspiracy to contravene section 13(1)(a)(i) of the Prevention of Fraud (Investments) Act 1958, false accounting and theft
- Penalty: Five years' imprisonment

Ernest Walter Saunders (born 21 October 1935) is a British former business manager. He became known in the UK as one of the "Guinness Four", a group of businessmen who attempted fraudulently to manipulate the share price of the Guinness company. He was sentenced to five years' imprisonment, but released after 10 months as he was believed to be suffering from Alzheimer's disease. He subsequently recovered.

== Personal life ==
He was born Ernest Walter Schleyer in Austria and moved to the United Kingdom in 1938 when his parents, a Jewish gynaecologist and an Austrian mother, emigrated to escape Nazi rule. He was educated at Emmanuel College, Cambridge. He married Carole Ann Stephing in 1963, and has two sons and one daughter.

== Professional life ==
He had a career in management with Beecham, Great Universal Stores and Nestlé before becoming chief executive of Guinness plc (now a part of Diageo plc) in 1981, remaining in the position until 1986. He was renowned for his ruthless cost-cutting efficiency, earning from his employees the sobriquet 'Deadly Ernest'.

Under his charge, early in 1986, Guinness plc launched a friendly takeover bid for Edinburgh-based Distillers Company plc, which was being stalked by a hostile bidder. This was effected by quietly boosting the Guinness share price. Subsequent to the bid, which resulted in success for Guinness, Saunders was charged (along with Jack Lyons, Anthony Parnes and Gerald Ronson) and convicted on 27 August 1990 of counts of conspiracy to contravene section 13(1)(a)(i) of the Prevention of Fraud (Investments) Act 1958, false accounting and theft, in relation to dishonest conduct in a share support operation (see Guinness share-trading fraud). A series of appeals was finally dismissed in December 2002, although a ruling by the European Court of Human Rights in Saunders v. the United Kingdom declared that the defendants were denied a fair trial by being compelled to provide potentially self-incriminatory information to Department of Trade and Industry (DTI) inspectors which was then used as primary evidence against them. This breached their privilege against self-incrimination.

While there was no suggestion that Saunders himself sought to or actually did profit from these offences in an immediate or direct manner, the allegation was that they were committed to increase the likelihood of their company's takeover bid succeeding. His board of directors at Guinness plc was not informed of, and had not sanctioned his arrangements, which included indemnities for unknowable amounts. He had passed $100 million to the American Ivan Boesky to invest shortly before Boesky's prosecution and imprisonment for insider trading, and following that investigation Saunders' plans were revealed to the DTI in Britain.

== Sentence and appeal ==
Saunders appealed against his prison sentence of five years and three expert witnesses appeared at the Appeal Court. A consultant neurologist acting for the Crown, Dr Perkins, said that Saunders was suffering from depression rather than Alzheimer's disease. One of the other expert witnesses, another neurologist, used brain scans and other evidence to indicate that Saunders's brain was abnormally small for a man of his age, an observation which he said was consistent with a brain disease diagnosis. He subsequently recovered.

On 16 May 1991, the sentence was reduced to two and a half years.

== European Court of Human Rights ==
By a majority of 16-4 the ECtHR found that there was a breach of Article 6. The court rejected the argument of the British government that the complexity of large fraud cases and the public interest in securing a conviction justified the compulsion; the court also rejected the argument that power of a trial judge to exclude admissions was a defence in this case.

The court stated that "the public interest cannot be invoked to justify the use of answers compulsorily obtained in a non-judicial investigation to incriminate the accused during the trial proceedings" and "the prosecution in a criminal case [must] seek to prove their case against the accused without resort to evidence obtained through methods of coercion or oppression in defiance of the will of the accused." Saunders was awarded legal costs of £75,000.

== See also ==
- Guinness plc v Saunders
