= Saunders v United Kingdom =

Submitted 9 and 13 September 1994 Decided 17 December 1996
- Full case name: Saunders v. United Kingdom
- Case: 43/1994/490/572
- Chamber: Grand chamber
- Nationality of parties: United Kingdom

Court composition
- President [[Mr R. Bernhardt]]

Keywords
- Fair trial

Saunders v. the United Kingdom was a legal case heard by the European Court of Human Rights regarding the right against self-incrimination and the presumption of innocence as included in the European Convention on Human Rights Article 6 paragraphs 1 and 2.

== Facts ==
In R. v. Saunders (1996), Ernest Saunders was convicted on twelve of fifteen counts of conspiracy, false accounting and theft relating to share dealing that occurred in 1986. During the investigation, the police relied on section 434(5) of the Companies Act 1985, which made it an offence to refuse to answer questions posed by Inspectors appointed by the Department of Trade and Industry, and provided that the answers to such questions would be admissible in court (unlike earlier acts (e.g. s.31 Theft Act 1968 or s.72 Supreme Court Act 1981) where the exclusion of the right to avoid self-incrimination was tied to a provision that the answers could not be used in evidence). Giving Saunders the option of either incriminating himself or "the court may punish the offender in like manner as if he had been guilty of contempt of the court." Saunders did answer questions during nine interviews from February to June 1987 and his answers were presented during his trial in 1989-90; the role of this specific evidence in securing his conviction is not clear. The legality of the statements obtained under compulsion was challenged at the trial under sections 76 and 78 of the Police and Criminal Evidence Act 1984 during two occasions when the court was held a voir dire. During the later trial of his co-defendants the interviews were also subject to a challenge of abuse of process. None of these legal challenges succeeded.

== Judgment ==
=== Court of Appeal ===
The case went to the Court of Appeal where it was rejected on 16 May 1991, with the court referring to the earlier dismissal (R. v. Seelig) regarding the legality of the interviews; leave to appeal was refused by the House of Lords. In December 1994 the Home Secretary referred the case to the Court of Appeal under the Criminal Appeal Act 1968. Again the applicant argued that the use at trial of answers given to the DTI Inspectors rendered the proceedings unfair. The Court rejected this argument, deciding that Parliament had clearly provided in the 1985 Act that answers given to DTI Inspectors may be admitted in evidence even though such admittance might override the privilege against self-incrimination.

Saunders had also appealed to the ECtHR, lodging his application on 20 July 1988.

=== European Court of Human Rights ===
By a majority of 16-4 the ECtHR found that there was a breach of Article 6. The court rejected the argument of the British government that the complexity of large fraud cases and the public interest in securing a conviction justified the compulsion; the court also rejected the argument that power of a trial judge to exclude admissions was a defence in this case. The court stated that "the public interest cannot be invoked to justify the use of answers compulsorily obtained in a non-judicial investigation to incriminate the accused during the trial proceedings" and "the prosecution in a criminal case [must] seek to prove their case against the accused without resort to evidence obtained through methods of coercion or oppression in defiance of the will of the accused." Saunders was awarded damages of £75,000, which was paid in June 1997.

But this was tempered by: "[the right to not self-incriminate] does not extend to the use in criminal proceedings of material which may be obtained from the accused through the use of compulsory powers but which has an existence independent of the will of the suspect such as, inter alia, documents acquired pursuant to a warrant, breath, blood and urine samples and bodily tissue for the purpose of DNA testing." The court also stated that "[it was not making a judgement on] whether the right not to incriminate oneself is absolute or whether infringements of it may be justified in particular circumstances."

One of the dissenting judges (Mr. S. K. Martens) pointed out that the court was, in effect, over-ruling the judgement made in Funke v. France, in that it found the prosecution's use of answers given by the defendant unfair, but that the use of documents obtained from the defendant by compulsion was acceptable.

While the judgement appeared decisive the caveats reduced its impact on English law as the majority of affected statutes do not contain any ambiguity over the treatment of information given under compulsory examination. Section 434 was amended in a Schedule to the Youth Justice and Criminal Evidence Act 1999. When Saunders was returned to the Court of Appeals it was held that the wording of section 434 did not allow for the exclusion of evidence solely on the grounds it was obtained under compulsion (R v. Saunders (1996) 1 Cr. App. R. 463), it was confirmed that "Parliament's clear intention... must defeat Convention jurisprudence." Further in British law Brown v. Stott (2003) allowed the admission of answers obtained by compulsory questioning under section 172 of the Road Traffic Act 1988, apparently in direct opposition to the ECtHR's ruling.

During the ECtHR's deliberations, the following case law was considered Deweer v. Belgium, Funke v. France, Fayed v. United Kingdom, John Murray v. United Kingdom.
