= Jack Lyons (financier) =

British financier

Isidore Jack Lyons (1 February 1916 – 18 February 2008), known until 1991 as Sir Isidore Jack Lyons, CBE, was a British financier.

After building up a substantial retail business with his brother Bernard Lyons (1913–2008), he was charged in 1987 in the Guinness share-trading fraud. He was convicted and was heavily fined. Subsequent judgments from the European Court of Human Rights held that his trial was not fair. However, the convictions of Lyons and the other members of the Guinness Four were upheld by the Court of Appeal of England and Wales and the House of Lords. Lyons was a significant philanthropist to the arts in Britain for many decades, donating to the London Symphony Orchestra, the University of York, the Royal Academy of Music and the Royal Opera House among others.

Lyons had been appointed a CBE in 1967 and knighted in 1973 for public and charitable services and services to the arts, but both these honours were rescinded in 1991 in the wake of his conviction. The British Prime Minister John Major wrote him a letter of consolation following the removal of his honours.

== Success in business ==
Lyons was born in Leeds, Yorkshire, the fifth of six children born to businessman Samuel Henry Lyons (1883/4–1959) and his wife Sophie (née Niman; 1885–1971), both Orthodox Jews. Samuel Lyons had emigrated to England from Poland when still a child.

Samuel Lyons had established a men's clothing business, Alexandre. The company had a factory and retail shops. Lyons attended Leeds Grammar School, leaving school at the age of 16, and later moved to the United States to study business at Columbia University. While there, war was declared and Lyons could not return to the UK so he enlisted in the Canadian army but because of his poor eyesight, he was confined to working in the Board of Trade. He met his future wife, singer Roslyn Rosenbaum, in Canada, and, in 1944, he became an assistant director of the country's Prices and Trade Board.

Returning to Leeds in 1945 he and his brother Bernard contributed considerably to the growth of the family business with the expansion of branches and the development of a lucrative export division during the early post-war period. This enabled the business to grow rapidly into a large conglomerate of companies called United Drapery Stores, or UDS. By the 1960s, UDS Group had succeeded in taking the lead as the United Kingdom's top retailer, with a 1,300-strong empire of retail shops. Businesses within the UDS conglomerate included: Richard Shops, Allders of Croydon, John Collier, Timpsons, Alexandre Stores, John Blundell Credit Company, John Myers catalogue mail order business, Brooks Brothers, Peter Pell, Arding & Hobbs and Whiteleys department stores, Fifty Shilling Tailors and other department and duty-free stores. The number of men's suits sold in all UDS menswear shops in the year ending January 1967 was 1,119,000.

Within Allders alone growth continued throughout the 1970s to such an extent that in 1976 it became the third largest department store in the country, beaten only by Harrods and Selfridges. Meanwhile, the UDS Group had entered a new retail arena, that of the duty-free shop, when it acquired the licence to open and operate the shop at London's Heathrow airport. Attached to its Allders department store division, and later operated as Allders International, the UDS Group rapidly built up its network of duty-free shops around the world. In 1983, the UDS Group was sold to Hanson plc.

With a mutual interest in musical endeavours, Lyons became acquainted with the Conservative Party Prime Minister Edward Heath, and remained close to his successor as Conservative leader, Margaret Thatcher. Lyons campaigned politically for lower rates of taxation and for continued state support of the arts.

In 1980 Lyons resigned from UDS and became a senior advisor to Bain & Company, the American management consultants. Lyons' political connections were valuable to Bain, and he worked as a business consultant and lobbyist in the early 1980s.

== Guinness case and appeals ==
Lyons was accused of having used his personal friendship with Prime Minister Margaret Thatcher to ensure the Guinness brewing group's offer for Distillers in 1986 was approved by the Office of Fair Trading. Thatcher replied to a letter from Lyons saying the matter would be passed to the minister then responsible, Paul Channon. The bid was subsequently unblocked. Lyons also bought a substantial block of Distillers and Guinness shares in the lead-up to the bid, with a personal guarantee from Saunders that any future losses in the value of his shares would be paid by Guinness.

He was charged in 1987 in the Guinness share-trading fraud, along with Ernest Saunders, Gerald Ronson, and Anthony Parnes, and the four men became known as "the Guinness Four". He was convicted but not sent to prison because he was suffering from ill-health. However, he lost his knighthood and was fined £3 million plus £1 million prosecution costs.

British prime minister John Major wrote to Lyons after revoking Lyons' knighthood in 1991: "It was painful for me to have to recommend that this be done, and I would not have inflicted this on you lightly. But the rules on forfeiture and the precedents left me, I regret, no alternative. May I assure you that the service which won you the honours in the first place is still appreciated and will never be forgotten."

In 1995, on appeal, one count of conspiracy was quashed and his fine was cut to £2.5 million. (The refund cheque of £500,000 was inadvertently made out to 'Sir Jack Lyons', although by then he had lost his title). Lawyers for the Guinness Four said their clients had lost their right to silence because they were compelled to give evidence to Department of Trade and Industry inspectors.

A third appeal in 2001 held by the European Court of Human Rights had ruled that the defendants were denied a fair trial by being compelled in law to provide potentially self-incriminatory information to Department of Trade and Industry inspectors which was then used as primary evidence against them. This breached their right to silence. At the time of the court of human rights verdict, Lyons said: "I welcome this judgment so that I may yet be able to enjoy a little of my retirement without the cloud of injustice hanging over me." The House of Lords finally ruled in 2002 that the convictions should stand.

== Philanthropy ==
Lyons was a generous philanthropist, and was especially noted for his support of artistic causes. In 1963 Lyons established 'The Sir Jack Lyons Charitable Trust' which continues to make donations in his name. In his native Leeds, Lyons became the chairman of the Leeds Musical Festival in 1955 at the behest of his wife, after it was threatened with closure in 1953 and brought George Lascelles, 7th Earl of Harewood in as the festival's musical director. Lyons chaired the festival's centenary festival in 1958 at which Duke Ellington and his orchestra performed and which was attended by Queen Elizabeth II. Lyons remained chairman of the Leeds Musical Festival for 17 years. Lyons funded the University of York's music department and a concert hall that was named for him.

Lyons became a trustee of the London Symphony Orchestra (LSO) in 1970 and the chairman of the orchestra's trust in 1974. The LSO honoured him by making Lyons their first honorary member who was not a musician in 1973. Lyons was an Honorary Fellow of the Royal Academy of Music and was the principal financial benefactor of a 300-seat theatre at the academy which was named after him. Lyons also funded a recording of the Anthem of Europe (the final movement of Ludwig van Beethoven's 9th Symphony) in 1972 under conductor Carlo Maria Giulini. Lyons also served as deputy chairman of the Fanfare for Europe cultural programme that marked the United Kingdom's membership of the European Economic Community in 1973.

Lyons was chairman of the Shakespeare Exhibition at Stratford-upon-Avon that marked the 400th anniversary of William Shakespeare's birth. Lyons was the chairman of the commemorations for the tenth anniversary of Britain's accession to the European Economic Community in 1983 and served as the chairman of the British Bicentennial liaison committee that staged cultural celebrations to mark the United States Bicentennial in 1976.

== Personal life ==
In 1943 Lyons married Roslyn Rosenbaum (1923–2014), the daughter of a Canadian eye surgeon. Rosenbaum was a singer and had trained under the Canadian opera singer Pauline Donalda. The couple's first child was born in Canada, and they moved to England at the end of World War II; they later had two sons and two daughters. Lyons suffered from bladder cancer and heart problems in his last years, which were spent in Canada, Florida, and Switzerland. Lyons died in Geneva, Switzerland, in February 2008, aged 92. His brother Bernard died a few weeks after him at his home in Buckinghamshire, England, in April 2008 aged 95.
