= Christopher Reeves =

Christopher Reeves may refer to:

- Christopher Reginald Reeves (1936–2007), British banker
- Christopher B. Reeves (born 1958), television dialogue editor
- "Brand New Dance", song by rapper Eminem originally titled "Christopher Reeves", released in 2024.

== See also ==
- Christopher Reeve (1952–2004), American actor, known for Superman films
