= Gail Ronson =

British charity fundraiser (born 1946)

Dame Gail Ronson, Lady Ronson, DBE (born 3 July 1946) is a British charity fundraiser, and the wife of businessman Sir Gerald Ronson whom she married when she was 21 years old. She has four children – Lisa, Amanda, Nicole, and Hayley – and nine grandchildren. She is also an aunt by marriage to Mark, Samantha and Charlotte Ronson.

A former model, Gail Ronson has contributed and supported a number of charitable organisations, including:

- Roundhouse Trust, fundraiser
- Royal National Institute of Blind People (RNIB), President 2012
- Jewish Care (formerly the Jewish Welfare Board), former board member

== Damehood and charitable activity ==
In the early years of her marriage, she became involved in charity work, handing out meals on wheels to elderly Jewish people. She later took part in charitable fund-raising initiatives: her first big project was the 125th anniversary of Jewish Care, in 1983, which was attended by Prince Charles and Princess Diana.

Gail Ronson was honoured for philanthropy and as a donor, especially to Jewish Care and the Royal Opera House. She was appointed Dame Commander of the Order of the British Empire (DBE), in the 2004 New Year's Honours List.
