= John Murray v United Kingdom =

Decided 25 January 1996
- Full case name: John Murray v United Kingdom
- Case: 41/1994/488/570
- Chamber: Grand chamber
- Nationality of parties: United Kingdom

Court composition
- President; Rolv Ryssdal

John Murray v United Kingdom was a legal case heard by the European Court of Human Rights in 1996 regarding the right to silence in the United Kingdom, especially the legality of the reduction in the right so as to allow for adverse inferences to be made.

John Murray was one of eight people arrested on 7 January 1990 in Belfast, Northern Ireland under the Prevention of Terrorism (Temporary Provisions) Act 1989; he was cautioned as specified in the Criminal Evidence (Northern Ireland) Order 1988. Following his arrest and over twelve interviews at Castlereagh, totaling over twenty-one hours in the next two days, Mr Murray refused to answer any questions despite being warned each time that "a court might draw such [common sense] inference[s] as appeared proper from his failure or refusal to do so".

At the trial in May 1991 before the Lord Chief Justice of Northern Ireland, sitting without a jury, Mr Murray chose not to give evidence. As part of his decision the judge drew adverse inferences against the defendant under Articles 4 and 6 of the 1988 Order. Mr Murray was found guilty of aiding and abetting the false imprisonment of a police informer and sentenced to eight years' imprisonment.

Mr Murray appealed to the Court of Appeal in Northern Ireland and lost on 7 July 1992. He had applied to the Commission in 1991, the case was referred to the ECtHR in 1994, heard on 20 June 1995 and the Court gave its opinion on 8 February 1996. Several groups filed written submissions including the Committee on the Administration of Justice, Amnesty International and the Northern Ireland Standing Advisory Commission on Human Rights.

Mr Murray complained that his rights under the European Convention on Human Rights had been breached, notably his right to silence during questioning and at trial, that the inferences from his silence were an integral part of the decision to find him guilty, the lack of access to a lawyer at the beginning of his detention and the different rights under the law in England and Northern Ireland because of the Northern Ireland (Emergency Provisions) Act. In the Convention these complaints refer to Article 6 paragraphs 1, 2, and 3c and also Article 14.

The Commission found the reductions to the right of silence were not in breach of Article 6; the right was not absolute. The Court decided thus as Mr Murray was able to remain silent and this was not a criminal offence or contempt of court. It also found that the inferences could not be regarded as unfair given the presence of sufficient safeguards, the repeated warnings given during the interviews, the prima facie evidence against the accused, and Mr Murray's refusal to provide any explanation, and that the inferences were not a significant part of his conviction. His lack of early access to a lawyer was incompatible with the concept of fairness as it had placed the accused in a situation where his rights might be irretrievably prejudiced.

Mr Murray was awarded £15,000 towards his costs and expenses.

The courts' decisions were by majority – 14–5 in regard of no breach of Article 6(1) and 6(2), 12–7 in regard of a violation of 6(1) with 6(3c), and unanimously that it was not necessary to examine the applicant's complaint of a violation of 6(1) and 14.

== See also ==
- Funke v. France (1993)
- Saunders v. the United Kingdom (1994)
