= Morgan, Grenfell & Co. =

London-based investment bank company

- Industry: Investment bank
- Founded: 1851; 175 years ago (as George Peabody & Co.)
- Founder: George Peabody
- Fate: Acquired
- Successor: Deutsche Bank
- Headquarters: London, England, United Kingdom

Morgan, Grenfell & Co. was a leading London-based investment bank regarded as one of the oldest and once most influential British merchant banks. It had its origins in a merchant banking business commenced by George Peabody. Junius Spencer Morgan became a partner in 1854. After Peabody retired the business was styled J. S. Morgan & Co. In 1910, it was reconstituted as Morgan Grenfell & Co. in recognition of the senior London-based partner, Edward Grenfell, although J. P. Morgan & Co. still held a controlling interest. In the 1930s, it became a commercial bank and the Morgan family relinquished their controlling interest in the business. After a period of retrenchment, it expanded under the management of William Harcourt, 2nd Viscount Harcourt in the 1960s. The link with J. P. Morgan & Co. ended completely in the 1980s. The business also became embroiled in the Guinness share-trading fraud at that time. In 1990, Morgan Grenfell was acquired in an agreed deal by its minority shareholder, Deutsche Bank. The use of the Morgan Grenfell name was discontinued by Deutsche Bank in 1999.

== History ==
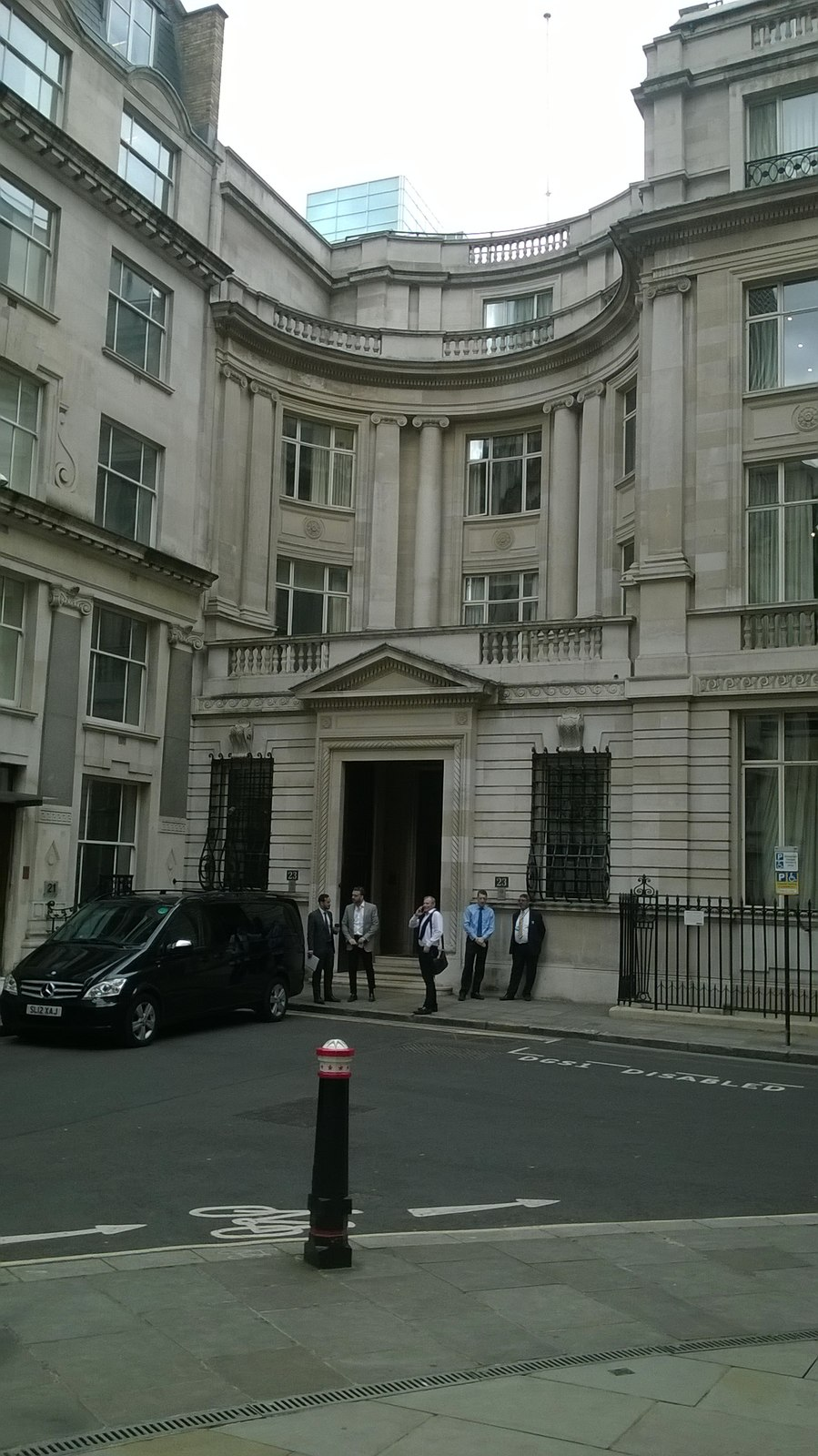
The offices of Morgan, Grenfell & Co. in Great Winchester Street, London

=== The Peabody era ===
The bank emerged from the merchant banking business commenced by George Peabody on his own account when he took up residence in London in 1838 pursuant to his commodities merchanting business (Peabody, Riggs & Co.) in which had already made his fortune. The banking business was formally incorporated in 1851 as George Peabody & Co. and by the time of Peabody's retirement in 1864 had become the largest American merchant bank in London. In 1854 Peabody had taken on Junius Spencer Morgan as a partner with just under a 9% interest in the capital of the firm and a 28% interest in its profits. The firm expanded rapidly especially in the business of extending credits for the transatlantic trade. However, it came under severe strain during the Panic of 1857, principally as a result of the difficulties experienced by and in some cases the bankruptcy of Peabody & Co.'s American agents. In late 1857 Peabody & Co. were obliged to seek help in the form of a loan from the Bank of England. Paradoxically, the fact that the Bank felt it necessary to support Peabody & Co. rather than risk its failure, underlined the important position the firm had by this time achieved and Peabody & Co. emerged from the crisis with reputation intact, if not enhanced, and were able to repay the loan in March 1858.

=== The Morgan era ===
Peabody himself emerged from the crisis tired and ill. While remaining senior partner for the time being, he increasingly withdrew from the business leaving Morgan as its effective head. Peabody's focus became the philanthropic use of his considerable fortune. Peabody, who died in 1869, finally retired in 1864 when his 10-year partnership agreement with Morgan came to an end. Morgan formally assumed control of the business but had to accept Peabody's unwillingness to see the firm (over which he would no longer have any control or influence) continue to trade under the Peabody name benefitting from the reputational goodwill the Peabody & Co. name had in the marketplace. As a consequence the firm was re-styled J. S. Morgan & Co. The firm's New York agency was in due course to become J. P. Morgan & Co., named after Junius' son, John Pierpont ("J. P.") Morgan.

On the death of Junius in 1890 Pierpont became the senior partner of the London firm. By 1910 all the firm's Morgan family partners were resident in the US and to reflect this the London partnership was restructured with J. P. Morgan & Co. in the US assuming a 50% ownership of the London business which was reconstituted as Morgan Grenfell & Co. in recognition of the senior London-based partner, Edward Grenfell.

For many years the business was heavily focused on transatlantic business. This led to the Morgan houses playing an important role in the First World War with J. P. Morgan and Co. acting as the British Government's purchasing and financial agent in the US with purchases and associated loans and exchange business channelled through Morgan Grenfell and J. P. Morgan & Co.. After the war the Morgan houses played a key role in European post-war financial reconstruction in the 1920s. It was also during this period that the firm built a leading corporate finance business organising and advising on the issuance and underwriting of domestic securities.

=== Retrenchment ===
Consequent to the Glass–Steagall Legislation of 1933 J. P. Morgan & Co. had to choose between being a commercial or an investment bank. The partners chose the former and as a result were required to relinquish their controlling interest in Morgan Grenfell which was to continue to conduct both lending and investment banking business. This was achieved in 1934 by incorporating the London firm into Morgan Grenfell & Co. Ltd., with J. P. Morgan and Co. holding a one-third stake and the London partners holding the balance. Although J. P. Morgan's son, J. P. "Jack" Morgan, remained on the Morgan Grenfell board until his death in 1941, the relationship between the London and New York businesses which had to that time been a keystone to the firms' success necessarily became more remote coinciding with and probably contributing to a period of relative hibernation for Morgan Grenfell. Although still possessing a blue-chip client list and first-rate reputation the period from 1934 is regarded as one of drift and inertia.

=== Resurgence ===
Morgan Grenfell started to emerge from its period of retreat in the 1960s when William Harcourt, 2nd Viscount Harcourt, a great-grandson of Junius Morgan (through the daughter of his mistress, he was never married), brought in fresh talent leading to a new period of growth and resurgence. One of the most important arrivals in 1967 was Sir John Stevens whose training as a solicitor and his experience working both at the IMF in Washington and at the Bank of England (where he became a director and was believed to have narrowly been passed over in 1966 for the governorship) as well as his experience as British Economic Minister in Washington made him an ideal recruit. Harcourt needed a younger man to effect needed organisational changes and saw him as a natural successor to the chairmanship of the firm. In 1973 as arrangements were being made for Stevens to succeed Harcourt as chairman he unexpectedly died at the age of fifty-nine.

The Stevens years had nevertheless seen huge changes in the organisation and its culture. The firm became once again one of London's leading advisory and corporate finance businesses with a new emphasis on mergers and acquisitions in which it gained a reputation for innovation and daring, surprising for what was regarded as such a traditional firm. Banking business to date had largely been based on providing short-term finance to companies through the medium of acceptance credits – the process of guaranteeing repayment of companies' bills of exchange by way of the bank, for a fee or commission, providing their countersignature ("acceptance") so that the bills would secure the finest interest rate for the company when sold to the market. This was expanded and new areas of business opened notably in international project and capital goods export finance. In asset management the small private client team was transformed into a predominantly institutional investment division, becoming one of the leading London-based asset managers. By 1980 Morgan Grenfell was by far the largest manager of international assets for US pension funds, having anticipated early the international diversification of US pension investments which would arise as a consequence of the passing into law of the US Employee Retirement Income Security Act 1974. In recognition of the export and capital goods finance department's successes Morgan Grenfell became in 1975 the first merchant bank to be awarded the Queen's Award to Industry for export achievement.

=== End of the J. P. Morgan link ===
Although Morgan Grenfell remained an unquoted company until 1986 capital was raised for expansion during the 1960s and 1970s through private placement of stock with institutional investors. However, the continuing substantial minority ownership by a US commercial bank imposed legal constraints on conducting investment banking business in the US, a clear disadvantage at a time of international growth opportunities. This was eventually resolved by a series of transactions in 1981 and 1982 which resulted in Morgan Guaranty Trust (which J. P. Morgan & Co. had become) selling its shareholding.

=== Securities trading venture and withdrawal ===
Following changes in UK law to eliminate restrictive practices and increase competition in securities trading Morgan Grenfell created new securities sales and trading business in 1984. The bank decided to enter the securities market buying Pinchin Denny, a stock jobber, in April 1984 and Pember & Boyle, a stockbroker, in October 1984.

To raise new capital to finance the new operations new equity was issued through a rights issue to existing shareholders and the introduction of Deutsche Bank as a new shareholder. With a view to facilitating future capital raising in 1986 Morgan Grenfell sought and was granted a listing on the London Stock Exchange. However, the 1987 market crash put great strains on the new securities business which was gaining market share but at the cost of increasing losses. By late 1988 management decided to discontinue the business to protect the firm's overall profitability although the businesses in New York and Singapore were retained.

=== Guinness scandal ===
Morgan Grenfell's aggressive prowess in mergers and acquisitions resulted in it overstepping the rules when acting as advisor to Guinness plc during the Guinness share-trading fraud. Investigations by the Department of Trade and Industry led to several resignations within the firm including the chief executive Christopher Reeves. While this was a severe reputational blow, the impact proved to be relatively short-term.

=== Deutsche Bank era ===
In 1990, Morgan Grenfell was acquired in an agreed deal by 4.9% shareholder Deutsche Bank who had ambitious expansion plans but no significant investment banking operation in London outside bond trading. The deal valued Morgan Grenfell at $1.48 billion, Deutsche stating that the acquisition recognised "...the pre-eminence of the London marketplace within Europe in the fields of corporate finance and asset management." Morgan Grenfell had been seeking a friendly suitor after an unwanted approach from 14.9% shareholder Compagnie Financiere de Suez (who proposed a merger with their banking subsidiary Banque Indosuez) and agreed terms with Deutsche after ending talks with Barclays Bank. Following the acquisition the firm continued to trade as an independent entity but five years later as Deutsche started to exert more explicit control following the discovery of irregularities in the asset management business resulting in a £2 million fine and board resignations, the name became Deutsche Morgan Grenfell. On 4 June 1999 the use of the Morgan Grenfell name was discontinued by Deutsche Bank when Deutsche Morgan Grenfell was merged with Bankers Trust to form Deutsche Asset Management (DAM) with Robert Smith as CEO.

== Notable current and former employees ==
=== Business ===
- Vivian Smith, 1st Baron Bicester, former chairman of Yule Catto & Co.
- Francis Rodd, 2nd Baron Rennell, former non-executive director of British Overseas Airways Corporation
- Thomas Catto, 1st Baron Catto, former governor of the Bank of England
- John Craven, non-executive director, Reuters Group
- Chris Grigg, Chief Executive, British Land
- Nicola Horlick, founder of Bramdean Asset Management
- Professor Michael Mainelli, co-founder of the Commercial think-tank Z/Yen Group and emeritus Gresham Professor of Commerce at Gresham College
- James Murren, president, chairman of the board and chief executive officer, MGM Resorts International
- Christopher Reginald Reeves, group chief executive, Morgan Grenfell; chairman Merrill Lynch Europe, Middle East & Africa
- Ian Wace, founder of Marshall Wace Asset Management
- Bob Wigley, former chairman, Merrill Lynch Europe, Middle East & Africa

=== Politics ===
- Quentin Davies, Minister for Defence Equipment, Support and Technology
- Tan Jee Say, Singaporean politician, regional director ACCA Asia-Pacific
- Edward Grenfell, 1st Baron St Just, also director of the Bank of England and former member of parliament for the City of London
- Tremayne Rodd, 3rd Baron Rennell former member of the House of Lords for the Conservative Party (UK) and Scotland National Rugby Player
- Pat Toomey, US senator from Pennsylvania

== Notes ==
Citations

References

- Burk, Kathleen (1989). Morgan Grenfell 1838-1988: The Biography of a Merchant Bank. Clarendon Press. ISBN 978-0-19-828306-5.
