= R (Green Environmental Industries Ltd) v Hertfordshire CC =

2001 British environmental law case

R v Hertfordshire CC, ex p Green Environmental Industries Ltd
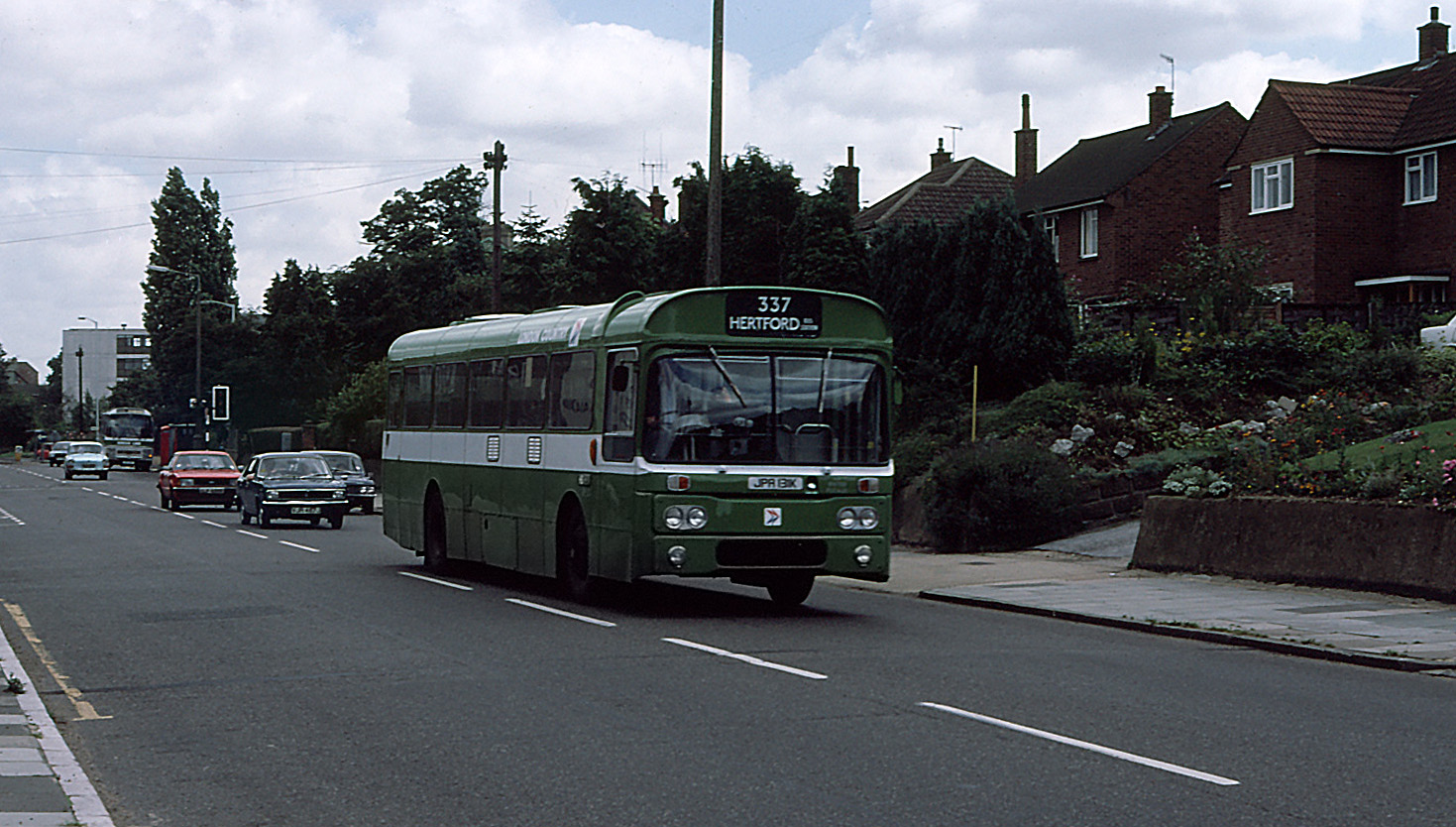
- Ware Road, Hertford
- Court: House of Lords
- Full case name: Regina v Hertfordshire County Council, ex parte Green Environmental Industries Limited
- Citations: [2001] UKHL 11, [2000] 2 AC 412

Keywords
- Environmental protection, human rights

R v Hertfordshire CC, ex p Green Environmental Industries Ltd [2001] UKHL 11 is a UK environmental law and human rights case, concerning the interests of the public in investigating breaches of environmental law, and the right to a fair trial under European Convention on Human Rights (ECHR article 6). It held that the ability of environmental protection authorities to demand information that could potentially be self-incriminating was not the same as requiring people incriminate themselves in trials. Therefore, a company that had been found to have unlawfully stored dangerous clinical waste could be compelled to produce evidence of further breaches.

== Facts ==
In June 1996 Green Environmental Industries Ltd and Mr John Moynihan were charged with offences under section 33 of the Environmental Protection Act 1990. In November 1995 a 100 tonnes of clinical waste (including placenta, needles and glass) was found in trailers and at a warehouse near in the Rookery Transport Cafe near Hatfield, and in the centre of Hertford, on Ware Road at the Addis factory site. The property was leased or licensed to GEI Ltd, which did not have a licence for its storage. Moynihan as director and sole shareholder was asked by the council on 23 November 1995 to remove the waste or the council would under EPA 1990 ss 33 and 59 do it at Moynihan’s expense. Moynihan replied by fax, and the council removed the waste for £200,000. Two weeks later, under EPA 1990 section 71(2) it demanded that Moynihan provide details of (1) people, companies and hospitals hat had supplied waste to Green (2) who carried waste on its behalf (3) staff employed to handle the waste (4) companies Green employed to dispose of the waste (5) suppliers or hirers of the trailers (6) keepers of any vehicles used to collect the waste (7) locations of any other sites Green used and (8) where three bins previously at the site now were. On the advice of his solicitor, Green replied he would give information if he was given the assurance that none of it would be used a prosecution. The council stood its ground and on 6 February 1996 Moynihan lost his case in front of a magistrate, and appeals to the High Court and Court of Appeal were dismissed. Moynihan and GEI Ltd argued that EPA 1990 s 71 breach the right to a fair trial and against self-incrimination under ECHR art 6.

== Judgment ==
Lord Hoffmann held that according to domestic law, and the jurisprudence of the ECHR, the EPA 1990 s 70 did not breach the privilege against self-incrimination, nor ECHR art 6 right to a fair trial. The information that had to be given was only due before any hearing took place, and there was no guarantee that proceedings would ever be brought. The information could be given in the person’s own time and on advice. It was different to being under questioning by a judge in a court. His judgment went as follows.

As Lord Mustill said in R v Director of the Serious Fraud Office, Ex parte Smith [1993] A.C. 1, 30-31, the expression "privilege against self-incrimination" or "right to silence" is used to refer to several loosely linked rules or principles of immunity, differing in scope and rationale. Perhaps the best known example is the rule that a person on trial should not be compelled to undergo inquisition by the prosecution or the court. Such methods were brought into disrepute by the practices of the prerogative courts of the sixteenth and seventeenth centuries and have since been regarded as inconsistent with a fair trial. But the rule plainly has nothing to do with the present case which is not concerned with the trial process at all. There are also associated principles which confer a right to silence or privilege against self-incrimination during the pre-trial investigation, such as the exclusion of involuntary confessions and the prohibition on the questioning of suspects without caution or after charge. These latter prohibitions are prophylactic rules designed to inhibit abuse of power by investigatory authorities and to preserve the fairness of the trial by preventing the eliciting of confessions which may have doubtful probative value: see Lord Templeman in A.T. & T. Istel Ltd v Tully [1993] A.C. 45, 53. There is also a general privilege not to be compelled to answer questions from people in authority; based, as Lord Mustill put it in R v Director of the Serious Fraud Office, Ex parte Smith [1993] A.C. 1, 31, upon "the common view that one person should, so far as possible, be entitled to tell another person to mind his own business."

[...]

Even without express words, the statute may impliedly exclude the privilege on the ground that it would otherwise be largely ineffective. So in In Re London United Investments Plc [1992] Ch. 578 the Court of Appeal decided that the privilege was impliedly excluded by the terms of a statute which conferred power on company inspectors appointed by the Secretary of State to require documents and answers to questions from any person whom they consider may have relevant information. In Bishopsgate Investment Management Ltd v Maxwell [1993] Ch. 1, 20 Dillon L.J. said of the In Re London United Investments Plc. case and a similar decision on investigatory powers conferred on the Bank of England by the Banking Act 1987 (Bank of England v Riley [1992] Ch. 475):

"The essence of both decisions is that if Parliament, in the public interest, sets up by statute special investigatory procedures to find out if the affairs of a company have been conducted fraudulently, with the possibility of special remedies in the light of an inspector's report, or to find out if there have been infringements of certain sections of the Banking Act 1987 which have been enacted for the protection of members of the public who make deposits, Parliament cannot have intended that anyone questioned under those procedures should be entitled to rely on the privilege against self-incrimination, since that would stultify the procedures and prevent them achieving their obvious purpose."

Mutatis mutandis, it seems to me that this reasoning is applicable to the powers of investigation conferred by section 71(2). Those powers have been conferred not merely for the purpose of enabling the authorities to obtain evidence against offenders but for the broad public purpose of protecting the public health and the environment. Such information is often required urgently and the policy of the statute would be frustrated if the persons who knew most about the extent of the health or environmental hazard were entitled to refuse to provide any information on the ground that their answers might tend to incriminate them. Parliament is more likely to have intended that the question of whether the obligation to provide potentially incriminating answers has caused prejudice to the defence in a subsequent criminal trial should be left to the judge at the trial, exercising his discretion under the Act of 1984. For these reasons, I would regard the case for implied exclusion of the privilege as even stronger than it was in the cases under the Banking and Companies Acts.

[...]

The jurisprudence of the European Court of Human Rights on this point is based upon the right to a "fair and public hearing" in Article 6(1) and the presumption of innocence in Article 6(2). The leading case on the privilege against self-incrimination as a part of this right is Saunders v United Kingdom (1996) 23 E.H.R.R. 313. Mr. Saunders was convicted after a long trial on 12 counts of conspiracy, false accounting and theft in connection with a contested take-over bid. Before the trial he had been examined by inspectors appointed by the Secretary of State under the Companies Act 1985 to investigate the affairs of the bidding company. The inspectors examined Mr. Saunders under section 434 of the Act, which conferred compulsory powers and expressly provided in subsection (5) that his answers might be used in evidence against him. Transcripts of his examination were accordingly given in evidence at the trial and the Court of Appeal (Criminal Division) held that the clear words of section 434(5) prevented the discretion under section 78 of the Act of 1984 being used to exclude the evidence merely on the ground that it was obtained under compulsion: see R v Saunders [1996] 1 Cr. App. R. 463, 474-478. The European Court held that the use of the transcripts in this way was a violation of Mr. Saunders' rights under Article 6(1). The court rejected the arguments of the U.K. Government that the complexity of corporate fraud and the public interest in its investigation and punishment could justify the admission of the evidence. It said flatly (in para. 74) that "the public interest cannot be invoked to justify the use of answers compulsorily obtained in a non-judicial investigation to incriminate the accused during the trial proceedings." As a result of this decision, Parliament in a Schedule to the Youth Justice and Criminal Evidence Act 1999 amended section 435 of the Act of 1985 by excluding evidence of the answers in prosecutions for certain offences. Similar amendments were made to other statutes but not to section 71 of the Act of 1990, presumably because it contains no express provision that answers are to be admissible and therefore leaves the discretion under section 78 unimpaired. After the Human Rights Act 1998 comes into force, a judge at a criminal trial at which an answer to a request under section 71 is tendered in evidence will have to consider whether Article 6(1), as interpreted in Saunders v United Kingdom (1996) 23 E.H.R.R. 313, requires him to exercise the discretion to exclude the evidence.

But none of this is relevant to the present case because no answer under section 71(2) has been tendered in evidence against Green or Mr. Moynihan. This case is concerned with the legality of the procedure by which they were required to give answers, corresponding to the examination before the Inspectors in Saunders.

Lord Steyn, Lord Cooke, Lord Hobhouse and Lord Slynn concurred.

== See also ==
- UK company law
- O'Halloran v United Kingdom (2008) 46 EHRR 21, suggest article 6 can be limited if national authorities have a clear and proper public objective, on the Road Traffic Act 1988 s 172, for speeding.
