= Annabelle Dexter-Jones =

British-American actress and director (born 1986)

- Born: 26 October 1986 (age 40); London, England
- Years active: 2012–present
- Father: Mick Jones
- Relatives: Charlotte Ronson (half-sister); Samantha Ronson (half-sister); Mark Ronson (half-brother)

Annabelle Dexter-Jones (born 26 October 1986) is an English-American actress and director known for her roles in Succession, American Horror Story, and Under the Silver Lake. Jones is the daughter of jewellery designer Ann Dexter-Jones and Foreigner guitarist Mick Jones. Through her mother, she is the half-sister of Charlotte Ronson, Samantha Ronson, and Mark Ronson. She was born in London, England.

== Filmography ==
=== Film ===
| Year | Title | Role | Notes |
|---|---|---|---|
| 2012 | Missed Connections | Lauren - Mango Girl | |
| 2012 | Holy Motors | Assistant photographer | |
| 2014 | Asthma | Lilly | |
| 2015 | The Nymphets | Brittany | |
| 2015 | Ava's Possessions | Hazel | |
| 2015 | Hashtag Horror | Molly | |
| 2016 | White Girl | Alexa | |
| 2017 | The Meyerowitz Stories | Gallery girl | Uncredited |
| 2017 | Cecile on the Phone | Cecile | Short film; also director and writer |
| 2018 | Under the Silver Lake | Fannie | |
| 2019 | Ravage | Harper | |
| 2019 | Josie & Jack | Lily / Jack's girlfriend | |
| 2023 | Bad Things | Fran | |
| 2023 | Helen's Dead | Leila | |
| 2025 | Bird In Hand | Leigh | |

=== Television ===
| Year | Title | Role | Notes |
|---|---|---|---|
| 2016 | Red Oaks | Xan | 6 episodes |
| 2016 | Prototype | Donna Neuring | Television film |
| 2018 | The Deuce | Dancer | 4 episodes |
| 2019–2023 | Succession | Naomi Pierce | 8 episodes |
| 2022 | The Calling | Dania Miller | 4 episodes |
| 2023 | American Horror Story: Delicate | Sonia Shawcross / Adeline Harding | Main role |
| 2023–2024 | Based on a True Story | Serena | 6 episodes |
