= The Plumm =

Former nightclub in New York City

- Interactive map of The Plumm
- Address: 246 West 14th Street
- Location: New York City
- Coordinates: 40.7393°N 74.0019°W
- Type: Nightclub

Construction
- Opened: April 28, 2006
- Closed: April 23, 2009

The Plumm was a nightclub that opened on April 28, 2006, near the Meatpacking District of Manhattan. It was co-owned by Noel Ashman, Chris Noth, Samantha Ronson, Joey McIntyre, Damon Dash, Jesse Bradford, Simon Rex, and Rodney Afshari among others.

The Plumm occupied the space that previously housed popular clubs such as Nell's and NA, which was named for Noel Ashman. The club was considered "semi private". Select people were invited to join the club for a fee and they were given what the club described as "membership key chains". Entrance for non-club members was at the discretion of door staff.

Axl Rose and Tommy Hilfiger got into a physical fight at the club in May 2006. Guest DJs at the club included Lindsay Lohan, Agyness Deyn, and Joel Madden.

The club closed in April 2009, citing high rents, debts accrued in running the club, and the Great Recession.
