= Bad Things (film) =

2023 film by Stewart Thorndike

- Official release poster
- Directed by: Stewart Thorndike
- Written by: Stewart Thorndike
- Produced by: Lizzie Shapiro; Lexi Tannenholtz
- Starring: Gayle Rankin; Hari Nef; Annabelle Dexter-Jones; Jared Abrahamson; Molly Ringwald
- Cinematography: Grant Greenberg
- Edited by: Thomas Emmet Ashton; Kathryn J. Schubert
- Music by: Jason Falkner
- Production company: The Space Program
- Distributed by: Shudder
- Release date: June 9, 2023 (Tribeca)
- Running time: 87 minutes
- Country: United States
- Language: English

Bad Things is a 2023 horror-thriller film written and directed by Stewart Thorndike. It stars Gayle Rankin, Hari Nef, Annabelle Dexter-Jones, Jared Abrahamson and Molly Ringwald.

== Plot ==
Ruthie has recently inherited her grandmother's abandoned hotel, and has returned to stay in it for a few days with her girlfriend Cal, their friend Maddie, and tagalong Fran. Despite feeling uncomfortable there, Ruthie is hoping to fix her and Cal's troubled relationship, and reluctantly entertains the idea of running the hotel at Cal's insistence. She watches several hotel management videos on her phone featuring a woman, Ms. Auerbach. The groundskeeper, Brian, arrives, expressing his disappointment that Ruthie's estranged mother, who had been staying at the hotel, has ended things between them before leaving town. Ruthie informs Cal that her mother arranged a meeting for her with a buyer, which upsets Cal.

Privately, Maddie discusses their distaste for Ruthie, questioning why Cal is still with Ruthie after she cheated on her. Ruthie becomes increasingly agitated with Fran's presence, having secretly carried on an affair with her while at the hotel, then attempting to end it. The next morning, Fran encounters disturbing visions of former guests. Hysterical, Fran pleads with the others to all leave, but the group believes Fran is merely seeking Ruthie's attention, and they abandon her at a train station.

Ruthie begins to hallucinate that Ms. Auerbach is speaking to her in her videos and keeps receiving texts from her mother. Cal and Maddie, noticing Ruthie's gradual mental decline, are wary when she insists that Fran has returned and is a murderer. Brian returns and is murdered by a chainsaw-wielding figure in another wing of the hotel. Maddie is later attacked by the figure, who she believes is Ruthie. While waiting for a rideshare, Cal and Maddie find pictures of Ruthie and Fran together, which causes Ruthie to lash out and blame Cal for making her want to cheat. Maddie and Cal lock the unhinged Ruthie out of the hotel.

Ruthie breaks back in, discovering to her surprise the buyers there to discuss their terms, along with Ms. Auerbach, who claims she is a consultant. Encouraged by Auerbach, Ruthie refuses the deal, and they all leave. Trying to find Cal, she discovers Brian's body. Finding her with the body, Maddie and Cal overpower Ruthie and lock her in a room where Ruthie encounters the ghost of her childhood self and white liquid pouring from the ceiling. She is awoken the next morning by Fran, who has returned to rescue her. Cal sees that Fran really has returned, assumes she is threatening Ruthie, and attacks her. Ruthie pushes Fran out of a window, where she falls to her death in the empty pool.

Meanwhile, Maddie awakens and investigates a hotel room that Ruthie had previously forbade them from entering, discovering the body of Auerbach, who is revealed to be Ruthie's mother. Seeing that Ruthie has her mother's phone on her, Cal realizes the truth. Ruthie screams at Cal that she did not want to return here and that she forced her. Maddie and Cal flee the hotel grounds, but Ruthie chases them down with the chainsaw, murdering them in a strip mall parking lot while pedestrians walk by without reacting.

Ruthie returns to the hotel, now shown without windows, where she sees her mother with Brian in one of the rooms. Her mother shuts the door on her, leaving Ruthie to wander the halls alone.

== Cast ==
- Gayle Rankin as Ruthie Nodd
- Hari Nef as Cal
- Rad Pereira as Maddie
- Annabelle Dexter-Jones as Fran
- Molly Ringwald as Ms. Auerbach
- Jared Abrahamson as Brian
- Ariella Josephine as Young Ruthie
- Austin Jones as Ed Halleck

== Production ==
When creating the film, writer and director Stewart Thorndike wanted to feature a predominantly female and LGBTQ cast, as she felt that these groups were not properly represented in horror and thriller cinema. In an interview she stated that she wanted to show female versions of Travis Bickle and Jack Torrance, as well as the feeling of rage itself, opining that "we’re not allowed to explore even though we are feeling it — and maybe we even feel it more because we’re told not to." She further noted that the movie was to be part of a trilogy about motherhood.

Gayle Rankin was brought on to play one of the film's central characters, Ruthie, while Hari Nef was confirmed as portraying Cal. Filming took place in Ithaca, New York; Thorndike chose the specific hotel for filming as "It was very unusual but still modern. It felt like somebody had left it in the '90s during a prom or something."

== Release ==
Bad Things premiered at the Tribeca Film Festival on June 9, 2023. It was given an online release on August 25, 2023, through streaming service Shudder as one of its original programming.

== Reception ==
On the review aggregator website Rotten Tomatoes, 55% of 38 critics' reviews are positive, with an average rating of 4.9/10. The website's consensus reads: "There are good things and there are Bad Things, and while the film may not rise above its potential -- or source of inspiration -- it delivers a memorable experience." Metacritic, which uses a weighted average, assigned the film a score of 53 out of 100, based on 5 critics, indicating "mixed or average" reviews.
