= John Craven (businessman) =

South African businessman (1940–2022)

John Anthony Craven
- Born: 23 October 1940; Leominster, England
- Died: 30 March 2022 (aged 81); Tetbury, England

Sir John Anthony Craven (23 October 1940 – 30 March 2022) was a British financier who was chairman of Deutsche Morgan Grenfell Group plc, and a director of Deutsche Bank and Reuters.

== Early life ==
Craven was born in Leominster on 23 October 1940. He was educated at Michaelhouse and read law at Jesus College, Cambridge. He was a member of the Canadian and Ontario Institutes of Chartered Accountants.

== Career ==
In 1967, Craven joined SG Warburg & Co Ltd, becoming an executive director in 1969 under the tutelage of Siegmund Warburg. He became Group Chief Executive of White Weld & Co Ltd (subsequently Credit Suisse First Boston) from 1975 to 1978 and a vice-chairman of SG Warburg & Co Ltd in 1979. In 1981 he founded Phoenix Securities Ltd which was acquired by Morgan Grenfell Group plc in 1987 when he took on the role of Group Chief Executive of Morgan Grenfell Group plc, succeeding Christopher Reeves. He sat on the board of managing directors of Deutsche Bank from 1990 until 1996.

Craven was chairman of Morgan Grenfell Group plc from 1989, a post he retained when the group was renamed as Deutsche Morgan Grenfell Group plc in 1996. He was a non-executive director of Rothmans International plc and a member of the Supervisory Board, Société Générale de Surveillance SA, Geneva. He was also a Trustee of the Cambridge University Foundation.

Craven was knighted in the 1996 Birthday Honours for his services to banking, as "one of the leading City financiers of the past 30 years".

Craven died on 30 March 2022, at the age of 81.
