= Samantha Ronson =

British DJ and singer-songwriter

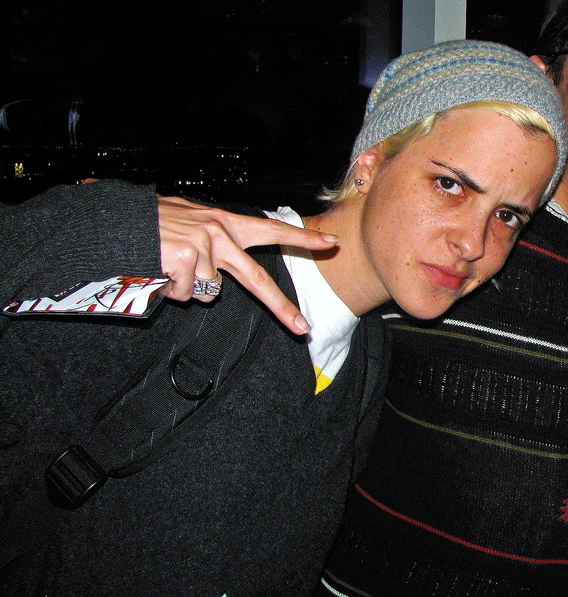
- Ronson in 2008

Background information
- Born: Samantha Judith Ronson; 7 August 1977 (age 49); Camden, London, England, UK
- Origin: Santa Monica, California, U.S.
- Genres: Hip hop, pop rock
- Occupations: DJ, singer-songwriter
- Years active: 1993–present
- Labels: Roc, Interscope
- Website: samantharonson.com

Samantha Judith Ronson (born 7 August 1977) is an English DJ, singer, and songwriter.

== Early life ==
Ronson was born in Camden, London, England, as the daughter of writer and socialite Ann Dexter-Jones, and one-time music executive and real estate entrepreneur Laurence Ronson.

When she was six years old her parents divorced, and she moved with her siblings, her mother, and her mother's new boyfriend, Foreigner guitarist Mick Jones, to New York City. Later, her mother married Jones, who contributed to Ronson's childhood being surrounded by music.

Ronson is the niece of property tycoon Gerald Ronson and is related to British Conservative politicians Sir Malcolm Rifkind and Leon Brittan, as well as to Odeon Cinemas founder Oscar Deutsch. Ronson's older brother, Mark, is a music producer and musician and her fraternal twin sister, Charlotte, is a fashion designer. Ronson has five younger half-siblings: Kenneth and Annabelle (through her mother's remarriage to Mick Jones) and Henrietta, David, and Joshua (by her father's marriage to model Michele First). Ronson also has two stepbrothers, Roman and Chris Jones, from Mick Jones' previous marriage.

Ronson was educated at the Chapin School on Manhattan's Upper East Side. She then studied creative writing and philosophy at New York University. Her parents are of Ashkenazi Jewish descent, with ancestors from Austria, Russia, and Lithuania, and Ronson was brought up in Conservative Judaism. Ronson's family name was originally Aaronson, but her grandfather, Henry Ronson, changed it to Ronson.

== Career ==
=== Early DJ years (2002–2010) ===
Ronson has stated that she fell into DJing by chance. "I got a call one night from a club that I used to hang out at, and they were like, 'Do you want to DJ?'" Ronson remembered. "I was like, 'No way,' [but] my friends were like, 'Come on, just do it.' I was always in the club; I figured I might as well make money off it." Ronson took the gig and quickly started to make a name for herself; eventually becoming a full-time DJ.

She has spun live for MTV's New Year's Eve show, the Super Bowl, Pan American Games, Sundance Film Festival, amfAR, Cannes Film Festival, American Music Awards, and MTV Video Music Awards. She has played private events for celebrities including Stevie Wonder, Jimmy Kimmel, Nicole Richie, Lionel Richie, Jessica Simpson, Ellen DeGeneres, Natalie Portman, Lindsay Lohan, and Jay-Z.

Ronson was the official DJ for Hennessy's Hennessy Black in 2011. In 2009, 2010, and 2014, Ronson designed her own set of sneakers for the company Supra. She appeared in a 2011 campaign for the cult fashion label Boy London in collaboration with The Cobrasnake. She was a co-owner of the New York City nightclub The Plumm, along with actor Chris Noth, film producer Noel Ashman, and others.

Ronson became the first rock act signed to Roc-A-Fella Records. In 2002, it was announced that Duncan Sheik would be co-producing an album for Ronson that would be out in the spring; however, given poor timing and the dissolution of the Roc-A-Fella Records, her first album was never released.

She released four songs on Roc-A-Fella Records: "Pull My Hair Out," "Fool," "If It's Gonna Rain," and "Built This Way," and wrote and recorded her first album, Red. "Built This Way" was featured in the movie Mean Girls. "Pull My Hair Out" was featured on the soundtrack of the movie The Woodsman. "Wanted," by Rhymefest featuring Samantha Ronson, appeared in the movie Half Nelson. In 2004, she opened for JC Chasez on his Schizophrenic Tour.

=== Chasing the Reds (2011) ===
In November 2011, Ronson released the album Chasing the Reds on her own label, Broken Toy Records. The album showcased her songwriting abilities, drawing inspiration from events in her life. In an interview with an American Songwriter, she stated, "I grew up in the studio with songs. My stepdad wrote some pretty incredible songs. My brother [producer and musician Mark Ronson] made his records because he likes making songs. So, the standard was set pretty high for being true to what you want to do. I'm not just going to hand my song over to a producer; I want to be there every step of the way. I feel like when you're doing what you love, instead of fitting yourself into somebody else's box, that comes across".

Guest stars appear on the album, including Wale on "Summer of Sam," Alex Greenwald of Phantom Planet on "Captain Jack," and Slash on the track "Love Song.". The album was produced by former Goudie guitarist Jimmy Messer, with Ronson herself sharing co-production credits. Her brother Mark produced one track, "Skyscrapers", which was co-written by the siblings with Santigold.

=== Ocean Park Standoff (2016–present) ===
In 2016, Ronson, Pete Nappi, and Ethan Thompson formed the band Ocean Park Standoff. The members first met at a songwriting session in 2014. Their debut single "Good News" was released on 7 October 2016, along with its B-side, "Photos & Liquor.". Ocean Park Standoff toured the US in 2017, and their debut EP was released on Hollywood Records on 3 March 2017.

== Legal actions ==
In May 2007, American actress Lindsay Lohan crashed her Mercedes-Benz in Beverly Hills. Police found a "small amount" of cocaine in her car, and blogger Perez Hilton posted on his blog that the drugs belonged to Ronson, using another celebrity gossip blog as a source for the story. Two weeks later, he started selling "Blame Samantha" T-shirts and called Ronson a "lezbot DJ.". Ronson hired Martin Garbus to start a defamation suit against Hilton and the original source for the story, Celebrity Babylon. Celebrity Babylon agreed to issue a retraction and apology on the understanding that Ronson would drop the claim; Hilton's lawyers asked the judge to throw out the case as an assault on his free speech rights. Garbus thought that it would be impossible to produce evidence that Hilton had acted with malice and reached an agreement with Hilton that would have kept Ronson from paying his legal fees. Ronson wanted Hilton's retraction and vetoed the proposal. Around the same time, Garbus presented a $100,000 bill after the $25,000 retainer had been accounted for. Garbus withdrew from the case and neither he nor Ronson appeared at Hilton's hearing, where the judge ruled in Hilton's favour, dismissing the case and ordering Ronson to pay Hilton's $85,000 legal fees.

Two weeks later, Garbus sued Ronson in New York for close to $142,000 in fees and services. He later dropped that suit. In May, Ronson filed a suit against Garbus in Los Angeles County Superior Court, contending that his incompetence had lost the case against Hilton and asking for damages in excess of $300,000. Among the allegations was that Garbus failed to fulfill his duties as her attorney because he was focused on collecting his fees. In response to Ronson's malpractice suit, he countersued to recover his fees.

On 1 August 2011, Ronson was pulled over in Baker, California, while driving her Porsche Targa back home from Las Vegas. She was initially stopped for driving at 89 mph in a 70 mph speed zone but was given a balance test since she seemed impaired. She was arrested for two misdemeanors for driving under the influence.

== Personal life ==
As of 2013, Ronson resides in Santa Monica, California.

About her sexuality, Ronson had initially denied claims that she is a lesbian, stating that she dates both women and men:

"Everyone was like, 'Openly gay DJ Samantha Ronson...' No! Uh, excuse me! I'm not gay! I'm an equal-opportunity player! I still go back-and-forth. But I got called so many things by the press that 'openly gay' was the least of my worries at that point..."

In 2007, media outlets began commenting on Ronson and actress Lindsay Lohan, who were seen being affectionate in public. Several newspapers, including The Times and the Los Angeles Times, published opinion pieces describing their relationship as romantic. Lohan refrained from commenting on the nature of their relationship, stating through her publicist that she "wants to keep her private life private." Ronson stated, in a July 2010 interview with The Times, that she loves Lohan as a human being but the paparazzi's attention grew to be too much.

In February 2022, Ronson appeared on the Queery podcast, where she stated that she had struggled with accepting her sexuality for years. She also stated that she now identifies as gay.

== Cameos ==
Ronson appears in the music videos for Usher and Alicia Keys' "My Boo", Awolnation's "Burn It Down", N.E.R.D's "Everyone Nose", and brother Mark Ronson's "Ooh Wee". Ronson also appeared in a Gap commercial featuring rapper Common.

== Discography ==
=== Albums ===
- Red, Roc-A-Fella Records (2004, unreleased)
- Chasing the Reds – Samantha Ronson & The Undertakers, Broken Toy Records (2011)

=== Mixtapes ===
- Samantha Ronson & DJ AM – Challah (2003)
- Mark Ronson & Samantha Ronson – Get High (2004)
- Mark Ronson & Samantha Ronson – Get S R – The C Ronson Mixtape (2004)
- Samantha Ronson – Chasing the Red Mix CD (2011)

=== Singles ===
- "Fool" (2000)
- "Pull My Hair Out" (2004)
- "Built This Way" (2004)
- "Good News" (with Ocean Park Standoff, 2016)

=== Remixes ===
- Awolnation feat Wale – "Guilty Filthy Soul (Samantha Ronson Remix)" (2012)
- Duncan Sheik – "Kyoto Song (Samantha Ronson Remix)" (2012)
- The Chainsmokers feat. Priyanka Chopra – "Erase (Samantha Ronson Remix)" (2013)
- Natalia Kills – "Saturday Night (Samantha Ronson vs. DK Remix)" (2013)
- Lady Gaga feat R. Kelly – "Do What U Want (Samantha Ronson Remix)" (2014)
