= Charlotte Ronson =

English fashion designer

- Born: Charlotte Julia Ronson; Camden, London, England
- Education: New York University
- Occupation: Fashion designer
- Label: Charlotte Ronson
- Partner: Nate Ruess (2014–present)
- Children: 3
- Relatives: Samantha Ronson (twin sister); Mark Ronson (brother); Annabelle Dexter-Jones (half-sister)

Charlotte Julia Ronson is an English fashion designer, based in Los Angeles, US.

== Career ==
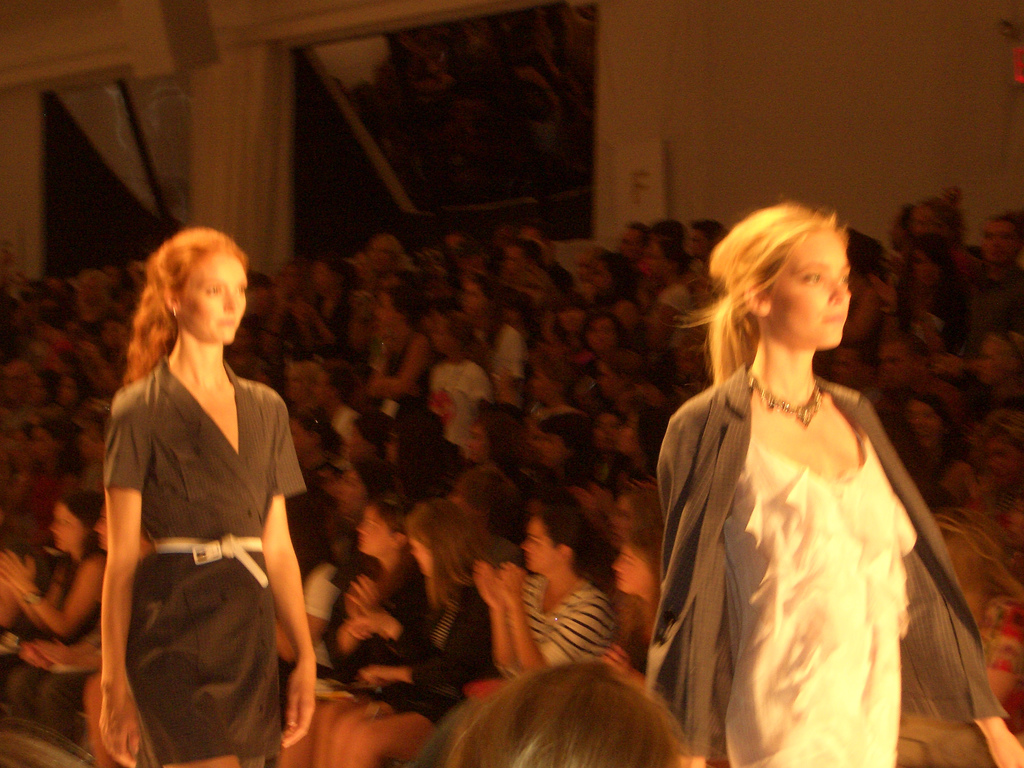
Charlotte Ronson designs, 2008

Charlotte Ronson always had an interest in fashion; however, she began designing after friends asked her to create pieces for them. She graduated from New York University (NYU) after majoring in Studio Art and interned at Harper's Bazaar, Rolling Stone, and with designer Cynthia Rowley.

In 2001, she began garnering attention from popular fashion magazines such as Vogue. By May 2002, Ronson had opened her flagship store on Elizabeth Street in New York. The Charlotte Ronson brand is partnered with Japanese apparel company, The Wall.

=== Charlotte Ronson ===
The original line of C. Ronson is now an offshoot of the larger Charlotte Ronson brand and the current New York store is now located on Mulberry Street. In 2008, Ronson designed a collaboration called "Play" by C. Ronson for Urban Outfitters, named after a mixtape her sister, Samantha Ronson, made for her.

Charlotte Ronson's brand has been worn by celebrities such as Mischa Barton, Gisele Bündchen, Andy Dick, Jennifer Love Hewitt, Lindsay Lohan, Kate Moss, Ellen Pompeo, Nicole Richie, Winona Ryder, Jessica Simpson, and Gwen Stefani.

== Personal life ==
Ronson was born on 7 August 1977 as the daughter of writer and socialite Ann Dexter–Jones and real estate mogul Laurence Ronson. She has said that her mother was strict when she was growing up and would not let her attend concerts.

She is related to politicians Malcolm Rifkind and Leon Brittan, and is a niece of businessman Gerald Ronson. Her parents are of Ashkenazi Jewish descent, with ancestors from Russia, Lithuania and Austria and Ronson was raised in Conservative Judaism. Ronson's family name was originally Aaronson but her grandfather Henry Ronson changed it to Ronson.

She has two siblings, fraternal twin sister Samantha Ronson, who is a DJ, and older brother Mark Ronson, who is a music producer, singer/songwriter, and DJ as well. Ann Dexter-Jones and Laurence Ronson divorced. Ronson's mother remarried, to Mick Jones of Foreigner, and the family relocated to New York. Ronson has five half-siblings by her parents' remarriages.

Ronson began dating American singer and songwriter Nate Ruess in March 2014. They had their first child, a son, Levon, in early 2017. They had their second child, a daughter, Olympia, in March 2019. They adopted their third child, another daughter, Delphine, in July 2023.
