= Jewish Care =

British charity

Jewish Care is a British charity, working mainly in London and South East England, providing health and social care support services for the Jewish community.

The charity runs over 70 centres and services which include care homes, community centres, independent living and other services such as support groups, a family carers team and telephone helpline.

The organisation cares for more than 12,000 people every week, stating that they operate with the belief that Jewish people should have access to specialist services that are designed to meet their needs. Jewish Care claims this is reflected in the care it provides which recognises traditions, beliefs and cultures, which are frequently shared by Jews. Jewish festivals, including the weekly Sabbath, are celebrated in Jewish Care homes, independent living communities and community centres.

Care and services are provided without assessment of the level or nature of an individual's religious observance. The charity has over 1,200 staff made up of over 70 nationalities and 3,000 volunteers.

== Services ==
Jewish Care provides services for:

- Older people
- People caring for others
- People living with dementia
- People with a physical or sensory disability, including those who are visually impaired
- Holocaust survivors and refugees
- People with mental health problems
- Younger people
- People who are facing end of life

The charity also has a dedicated helpline providing support, information, advice and signposting for health and social care issues.

== Board of trustees ==
- Chairman: Marcus Sperber
- Vice Chairs: Gayle Klein, Leah Hurst
- Trustees: Michael Brodtman, Darren Braham, Harold Gittelmon, Leah Hurst, Jonathan Rose, Amy Woolf, Stephanie Cooper, Dr Charles Daniels, Dr Abigail Swerdlow, Tessa Arnold
- Chief Executive: Daniel Carmel-Brown
- Life President: Lord Levy
- President: Steven Lewis MBE
- Honorary Presidents: Dame Gail Ronson DBE, Jonathan Zenios, Stephen Zimmerman
- Senior Vice Presidents: Debra Fox, Nicola Loftus, Linda Bogod, Arnold Wagner OBE

== Quotes ==
Prime Minister, The Rt Hon Rishi Sunak MP, said: “This is my first Jewish community dinner as Prime Minister and having heard so much about this incredible organisation, I’m absolutely delighted that I’m here with you at Jewish Care because your culture of service represents not just the best of our Jewish community, but the very best of Britain.”

Tony Blair, when he was British Prime Minister, said of the charity: "Jewish Care is not just Jewish values in action; it is actually the best of British values in action. You can be really, really proud of the work that you do."

Former Chancellor Sajid Javid praised communal organisations like Jewish Care and said "One thing that distinguishes the Jewish community is the way you look after each other in so many ways..It could teach many other communities about how much they can do for each other".

Jewish Care is one of the 100 largest UK charitable organisations ranked by annual expenditure.

== History ==
The charity was formed in 1990 by the merger of:

- Jewish Welfare Board
- Jewish Blind Society

Since then, nine more charities have merged with it, including:

- The Jewish Home and Hospital at Tottenham
- Food for the Jewish Poor (a soup kitchen)
- British Tay–Sachs Foundation
- Clore Manor (Friends of the London Jewish Hospital)
- Hyman Fine House
- Stepney Jewish (B'nai B'rith) Clubs and Settlements
- Sinclair House — Redbridge Jewish Youth and Community Centre

Jewish Care operates in association with:

- Otto Schiff Housing Association
- JAMI (The Jewish Association For Mental Illness)

The Jewish Board of Guardians, founded in London in 1859, was one of the oldest of the charities from which Jewish Care has descended. Gail Ronson took part in organising the celebration of the 125th anniversary of Jewish Care, in 1983, which was attended by Prince Charles and Princess Diana.
