= Guinness plc v Saunders =

- Court: House of Lords
- Citation: [1990] 2 AC 663

Court membership
- Judges sitting: Lord Keith of Kinkel, Lord Brandon of Oakbrook, Lord Templeman, Lord Griffiths, Lord Goff of Chieveley

Keywords
- Director remuneration, takeover bid, company constitution

Guinness plc v Saunders [1989] UKHL 2 is a UK company law case, regarding the power of the company to pay directors. It required that whatever rules exist for payment in the company's articles, they must be strictly observed.

== Facts ==
Guinness plc appointed a committee of three directors in January 1986, Ernest Saunders (the chairman), Olivier Roux and Tom Ward (who was an American attorney), to handle the company's affairs during a takeover bid for Distillers Company. Guinness was successful in its bid, though only after (among other things) Ward had been paid £5.2m. Ward claimed that this "fee" was agreed among the committee of three directors. Guinness plc's articles of association gave power to fix directors' remuneration to the whole board, which could then delegate any of its powers. It was not apparent that such power had ever been delegated.

Ward argued that the company's articles should be construed so that the committee could be vested with power to pay remuneration to its members. The new owners of Guinness plc argued that there had been no such power and the £5.2m had to be paid back.

== Judgment ==
The House of Lords held that the power to pay remuneration under the articles of the company should be strictly followed.

Lord Templeman gave the leading judgment. He stated the following.

Mr Ward admits receipt of £5.2 m from Guinness and pleads an agreement by Guinness that he should be paid this sum for his advice and services in connection with the bid. Mr Ward admits that payment was not authorised by the board of directors of Guinness.

The articles of association of Guinness provide:

'Remuneration of directors.

90. The board shall fix the annual remuneration of the directors provided that without the consent of the company in general meeting such remuneration (excluding any special remuneration payable under article 91 and article 92) shall not exceed the sum of £100,000 per annum. . . .

91. The board may, in addition to the remuneration authorised in article 90, grant special remuneration to any director who serves on any committee or who devotes special attention to the business of the company or who otherwise performs services which in the opinion of the board are outside the scope of the ordinary duties of a director. Such special remuneration may be made payable to such director in addition to or in substitution for his ordinary remuneration as a director, and may be made payable by a lump sum or by way of salary, or commission or participation in profits, or by any or all of those modes or otherwise as the board may determine.'

Articles 90 and 91 of the articles of association of Guinness depart from the Table A articles recommended by statute, which reserve to a company in general meeting the right to determine the remuneration of the directors of the company. But by article 90 the annual remuneration which the directors may award themselves is limited and by article 91 special remuneration for an individual director can only be authorised by the board. A committee, which may consist of only two or, as in the present case, three members, however honest and conscientious, cannot assess impartially the value of its work or the value of the contribution of its individual members. A director may, as a condition of accepting appointment to a committee, or after he has accepted appointment, seek the agreement of the board to authorise payment for special work envisaged or carried out. The shareholders of Guinness run the risk that the board may be too generous to an individual director at the expense of the shareholders but the shareholders have, by article 91, chosen to run this risk and can protect themselves by the number, quality and impartiality of the members of the board who will consider whether an individual director deserves special reward. Under article 91 the shareholders of Guinness do not run the risk that a committee may value its own work and the contribution of its own members. Article 91 authorises the board, and only the board, to grant special remuneration to a director who serves on a committee.

It was submitted that article 2 alters the plain meaning of article 91. In article 2 there are a number of definitions each of which is expressed to apply 'if not inconsistent with the subject or context.' The expression 'the board' is defined as

'The directors of the company for the time being (or a quorum of such directors assembled at a meeting of directors duly convened) or any committee authorised by the board to act on its behalf.'

The result of applying the article 2 definition to article 91, it is said, is that a committee may grant special remuneration to any director who serves on a committee or devotes special attention to the business of the company or who otherwise performs services which in the opinion of the committee are outside the scope of the ordinary duties of a director. In my opinion the subject and context of article 91 are inconsistent with the expression 'the board' in article 91 meaning anything except the board. Article 91 draws a contrast between the board and a committee of the board. The board is expressly authorised to grant special remuneration to any director who serves on any committee. It cannot have been intended that any committee should be able to grant special remuneration to any director, whether a member of the committee or not. The board must compare the work of an individual director with the ordinary duties of a director. The board must decide whether special remuneration shall be paid in addition to or in substitution for the annual remuneration determined by the board under article 90. These decisions could only be made by the board surveying the work and remuneration of each and every director. Article 91 also provides for the board to decide whether special remuneration should take the form of participation in profits; the article could not intend that a committee should be able to determine whether profits should accrue to the shareholders' funds or be paid out to an individual director. The remuneration of directors concerns all the members of the board and all the shareholders of Guinness. Article 2 does not operate to produce a result which is inconsistent with the language, the subject and the context of article 91. Only the board possessed power to award £5.2m. to Mr. Ward.

Lord Templeman then ruled that none of the other articles gave the committee the power to pay directors, Ward was not entitled to pay as any kind of professional as a solicitor. Mr Saunders, even though he was chairman, had no actual or ostensible authority to agree that Ward should be paid. Finally, because the articles had an express procedure for pay, there could be no claim for quantum meruit by the court.

Lord Keith, Lord Brandon and Lord Griffiths concurred.

Lord Goff gave a concurring opinion. He noted that a Boardman v Phipps type quantum meruit can be made only ‘where it cannot have the effect of encouraging trustees in any way to put themselves in a position where their interests conflict with their duties as trustees.’ His judgment went as follows.

I believe that I am not the only person concerned with these proceedings who has been startled by the size of that sum, which Mr. Ward has claimed to have been paid to him under a contract binding on Guinness. But, for present purposes, the amount is irrelevant. For since Guinness is seeking a judgment without a trial in proceedings in which Mr. Ward is protesting his good faith, he must be treated as, ex hypothesi, an innocent man, who has acted throughout in complete good faith, under what he believed to be a contract binding on Guinness, and indeed as one who claims to have rendered valuable services to Guinness, performed with great skill, which have contributed significantly, perhaps crucially, to the success of Guinness's bid for the shares in Distillers, thereby very substantially enriching the shareholders of Guinness. It is on this basis that Guinness's claim to be entitled to judgment against Mr. Ward has to be considered. It has also to be borne in mind that Mr. Ward claims that, if by any chance he is not entitled to the sum of £5.2m. under a contract binding on Guinness, then he is entitled to some recompense for the services which ex hypothesi he has rendered to Guinness, either by way of an equitable allowance, or on a quantum meruit, or under section 727 of the Act of 1985.

What course has the action taken? Before the Vice-Chancellor, judgment was given against Mr. Ward on admissions, on the basis that he had received the money in breach of his fiduciary duty as a director of Guinness, by reason of his failure to disclose his interest in the agreement under which he performed the services, as required by section 317(1) of the Companies Act 1985. In the Court of Appeal [1988] 1 WLR 863, Mr. Ward's appeal against that decision was dismissed. It was said of him, at pp 870-871, that he had 'succeeded in getting his hands on the company's money,' and that the company had never ceased to own the money which he had been paid. Accordingly Mr. Ward was constructive trustee of the money which he had received, and must pay it back. If he wished to make a claim for remuneration in respect of the services which he claimed to have rendered to Guinness, he must bring a separate action.

The matter then came before your Lordships' House, by leave of the House. Mr. Ward's submissions were presented to the Appellate Committee, in an argument conspicuous for its moderation as well as for its skill, by junior counsel, Mr. Crow. It gradually became clear that Mr. Crow's criticisms of the decisions of the courts below were well founded, and that (quite apart from very serious difficulties arising upon the construction of section 317) they were inconsistent with Hely-Hutchinson v Brayhead Ltd [1968] 1 QB 549, a decision of an exceptional Court of Appeal consisting of Lord Denning MR, Lord Wilberforce and Lord Pearson. The decision in that case proceeded on the basis that the statutory duty of disclosure (then embodied in section 199 of the Companies Act 1948) did not of itself affect the validity of a contract. The section had however to be read with provisions in the articles imposing a duty of disclosure upon directors of the company. If a director enters into, or is interested in, a contract with the company, but fails to declare his interest, the effect is that, under the ordinary principles of law and equity, the contract may be voidable at the instance of the company, and in certain cases a director may be called upon to account for profits made from the transaction: see per Lord Wilberforce, at p 589, and Lord Pearson, at p 594. Perhaps the matter is put most clearly by Lord Pearson, who said:

'It is not contended that section 199 in itself affects the contract. The section merely creates a statutory duty of disclosure and imposes a fine for non-compliance. But it has to be read in conjunction with article 99. The first sentence of that article is obscure. If a director makes or is interested in a contract with the company, but fails duly to declare his interest, what happens to the contract? Is it void, or is it voidable at the option of the company, or is it still binding on both parties, or what? The article supplies no answer to these questions. I think the answer must be supplied by the general law, and the answer is that the contract is voidable at the option of the company, so that the company has a choice whether to affirm or avoid the contract, but the contract must be either totally affirmed or totally avoided and the right of avoidance will be lost if such time elapses or such events occur as to prevent rescission of the contract . . .'

On this basis I cannot see that a breach of section 317, which is not for present purposes significantly different from section 199 of the Act of 1948, had itself any effect upon the contract between Mr. Ward and Guinness. As a matter of general law, to the extent that there was failure by Mr. Ward to comply with his duty of disclosure under the relevant article of Guinness (article 100(A)), the contract (if any) between him and Guinness was no doubt voidable under the ordinary principles of the general law to which Lord Pearson refers. But it has long been the law that, as a condition of rescission of a voidable contract, the parties must be put in statu quo; for this purpose a court of equity can do what is practically just, even though it cannot restore the parties precisely to the state they were in before the contract. The most familiar statement of the law is perhaps that of Lord Blackburn in Erlanger v New Sombrero Phosphate Co (1878) 3 App Cas 1218, when he said, at p. 1278:

'It is, I think, clear on principles of general justice, that as a condition to a rescission there must be a restitutio in integrum. The parties must be put in statu quo... It is a doctrine which has often been acted upon both at law and in equity.'

However on that basis Guinness could not simply claim to be entitled to the £5.2m. received by Mr. Ward. The contract had to be rescinded, and as a condition of the rescission Mr. Ward had to be placed in statu quo. No doubt this could be done by a court of equity making a just allowance for the services he had rendered; but no such allowance has been considered, let alone made, in the present case.

Faced with these problems, Mr. Oliver was driven, in the last resort, to submit that Hely-Hutchinson v Brayhead Ltd was wrongly decided. I have to confess that I would hesitate long before holding that a decision of such a court was erroneous. Careful study of the decision, with the assistance of counsel, merely served to reinforce my natural expectation that the case was rightly decided.

This being so, it followed that the decisions of the courts below in the present case, founded as they were upon a breach of section 317 by Mr. Ward, were erroneous. In ordinary circumstances, this conclusion would have led to the appeal being allowed. But Mr. Oliver then sought to justify the judgment on other grounds. It was first suggested by him quite simply that Mr. Ward, having received the money as constructive trustee, must pay it back. This appears to have formed, in part at least, the basis of the decision of the Court of Appeal. But the insuperable difficulty in the way of this proposition is again that the money was on this approach paid not under a void, but under a voidable, contract. Under such a contract, the property in the money would have vested in Mr. Ward (who, I repeat, was ex hypothesi acting in good faith); and Guinness cannot short circuit an unrescinded contract simply by alleging a constructive trust.

The next suggestion was that it was unnecessary to have regard to section 317 at all. There was a simpler solution to the problem. The committee which Mr. Ward claimed to have agreed to his remuneration, thereby binding the company, had no power to do so, either under article 91 or under article 100(D) of the articles of association. It followed that the contract upon which Mr. Ward relied was void for want of authority, and that Guinness was therefore entitled to recover from Mr. Ward the money paid under it on the ground of total failure of consideration, or alternatively on the basis that he had received the money as constructive trustee. On this basis, it was suggested, summary judgment should be entered against Mr. Ward for the full sum.

Having had the benefit of the assistance of counsel, I have reached the conclusion that article 91 does not empower a committee of the board of Guinness to authorise special remuneration for services rendered by directors of the company. It is true that the articles of Guinness are conspicuous neither for their clarity nor for their consistency. In particular there is no sensible basis upon which it is possible to reconcile article 91 with article 110 without doing violence to the language of one or other article. But I am satisfied that I should accept Guinness's argument on this point.

But what about article 100(D)? Plainly, on its express words, it is outside the ambit of article 91. For under it a director who acts for the company in a professional capacity is to be remunerated as if he were not a director.

Mr. Crow told your Lordships that Mr. Ward claims that he was acting in a professional capacity, in that he was acting as a business consultant. Your Lordships' House has to consider whether that submission should be rejected without hearing any evidence upon it. I have been troubled whether it would be proper to do so. There is a tendency among elderly professional men to restrict the meaning of the word 'profession' to the older professions, such as the church, medicine and the law. But, in the course of this century, the meaning of the word has expanded, and I suspect that it is still expanding at an accelerating rate. For my part, I would be unwilling to hold, without evidence, what are the modern professions today. Even so, as is demonstrated in the speech of my noble and learned friend, Lord Templeman, there are the most formidable difficulties which would in any event have to be surmounted if business consultancy as such were to be recognised as a profession; and, especially as the expression 'business consultant' is capable of more than one meaning, I am satisfied that a bare assertion of the proposition cannot of itself be enough to justify a trial on this point in the present case.

The matter may be more appropriately approached in another way. Mr. Ward's profession was undoubtedly that of an American attorney, he being the senior partner in a law firm in Washington D.C.; and I can find no allegation in the pleadings that he was acting as a professional business consultant. Let it be supposed that he was not an American attorney but an English solicitor. It is well known that English solicitors may develop the most formidable negotiating skills, which they may deploy in the course of their profession as solicitors. No doubt the same is true of many experienced American attorneys. Had an English solicitor, who was also a non-executive director of Guinness, acted as Mr. Ward claims to have done, there might be circumstances in which he could claim to have acted in his professional capacity as a solicitor in this country. But it appears that Mr. Ward was not acting, in the context of a purely English take-over bid, in the course of his profession as an American attorney. He appears to have been simply deploying, as a non-executive director of Guinness, an incidental (though no doubt important) skill which he had acquired in the exercise of his profession. On this basis, on his pleaded case, Mr. Ward could not have been acting in the course of his profession and article 100(D) has no application in the present case.

But the matter does not stop there. Let it be accepted that the contract under which Mr. Ward claims to have rendered valuable services to Guinness was for the above reasons void for want of authority. I understand it to be suggested that articles 90 and 91 provide (article 100 apart) not only a code of the circumstances in which a director of Guinness may receive recompense for services to the company, but an exclusive code. This is said to derive from the equitable doctrine whereby directors, though not trustees, are held to act in a fiduciary capacity, and as such are not entitled to receive remuneration for services rendered to the company except as provided under the articles of association, which are treated as equivalent to a trust deed constituting a trust. It was suggested that, if Mr. Ward wishes to receive remuneration for the services he has rendered, his proper course is now to approach the board of directors and invite them to award him remuneration by the exercise of the power vested in them by article 91.

The leading authorities on the doctrine have been rehearsed in the opinion of my noble and learned friend, Lord Templeman. These indeed demonstrate that the directors of a company, like other fiduciaries, must not put themselves in a position where there is a conflict between their personal interests and their duties as fiduciaries, and are for that reason precluded from contracting with the company for their services except in circumstances authorised by the articles of association. Similarly, just as trustees are not entitled, in the absence of an appropriate provision in the trust deed, to remuneration for their services as trustees, so directors are not entitled to remuneration for their services as directors except as provided by the articles of association.

Plainly, it would be inconsistent with this long-established principle to award remuneration in such circumstances as of right on the basis of a quantum meruit claim. But the principle does not altogether exclude the possibility that an equitable allowance might be made in respect of services rendered. That such an allowance may be made to a trustee for work performed by him for the benefit of the trust, even though he was not in the circumstances entitled to remuneration under the terms of the trust deed, is now well established. In Phipps v Boardman [1964] 1 WLR 993, the solicitor to a trust and one of the beneficiaries were held accountable to another beneficiary for a proportion of the profits made by them from the sale of shares bought by them with the aid of information gained by the solicitor when acting for the trust. Wilberforce J. directed that, when accounting for such profits, not merely should a deduction be made for expenditure which was necessary to enable the profit to be realised, but also a liberal allowance or credit should be made for their work and skill. His reasoning was, at p 1018:

'Moreover, account must naturally be taken of the expenditure which was necessary to enable the profit to be realised. But, in addition to expenditure, should not the defendants be given an allowance or credit for their work and skill? This is a subject on which authority is scanty; but Cohen J., in In re Macadam [1946] Ch. 73, 82, gave his support to an allowance of this kind to trustees for their services in acting as directors of a company. It seems to me that this transaction, i.e., the acquisition of a controlling interest in the company, was one of a special character calling for the exercise of a particular kind of professional skill. If Boardman had not assumed the role of seeing it through, the beneficiaries would have had to employ (and would, had they been well advised, have employed) an expert to do it for them. If the trustees had come to the court asking for liberty to employ such a person, they would in all probability have been authorised to do so, and to remunerate the person in question. It seems to me that it would be inequitable now for the beneficiaries to step in and take the profit without paying for the skill and labour which has produced it.'

Wilberforce J's decision, including his decision to make such an allowance, was later to be affirmed by the House of Lords: sub nom. Boardman v Phipps [1967] 2 AC 46.

It will be observed that the decision to make the allowance was founded upon the simple proposition that 'it would be inequitable now for the beneficiaries to step in and take the profit without paying for the skill and labour which has produced it.' Ex hypothesi, such an allowance was not in the circumstances authorised by the terms of the trust deed; furthermore it was held that there had not been full and proper disclosure by the two defendants to the successful plaintiff beneficiary. The inequity was found in the simple proposition that the beneficiaries were taking the profit although, if Mr. Boardman (the solicitor) had not done the work, they would have had to employ an expert to do the work for them in order to earn that profit.

The decision has to be reconciled with the fundamental principle that a trustee is not entitled to remuneration for services rendered by him to the trust except as expressly provided in the trust deed. Strictly speaking, it is irreconcilable with the rule as so stated. It seems to me therefore that it can only be reconciled with it to the extent that the exercise of the equitable jurisdiction does not conflict with the policy underlying the rule. And, as I see it, such a conflict will only be avoided if the exercise of the jurisdiction is restricted to those cases where it cannot have the effect of encouraging trustees in any way to put themselves in a position where their interests conflict with their duties as trustees.

Not only was the equity underlying Mr. Boardman's claim in Phipps v Boardman clear and, indeed, overwhelming; but the exercise of the jurisdiction to award an allowance in the unusual circumstances of that case could not provide any encouragement to trustees to put themselves in a position where their duties as trustees conflicted with their interests. The present case is, however, very different. Whether any such an allowance might ever be granted by a court of equity in the case of a director of a company, as opposed to a trustee, is a point which has yet to be decided; and I must reserve the question whether the jurisdiction could be exercised in such a case, which may be said to involve interference by the court in the administration of a company's affairs when the company is not being wound up. In any event, however, like my noble and learned friend, Lord Templeman, I cannot see any possibility of such jurisdiction being exercised in the present case. I proceed, of course, on the basis that Mr. Ward acted throughout in complete good faith. But the simple fact remains that, by agreeing to provide his services in return for a substantial fee the size of which was dependent upon the amount of a successful bid by Guinness, Mr. Ward was most plainly putting himself in a position in which his interests were in stark conflict with his duty as a director. Furthermore, for such services as he rendered, it is still open to the board of Guinness (if it thinks fit, having had a full opportunity to investigate the circumstances of the case) to award Mr. Ward appropriate remuneration. In all the circumstances of the case, I cannot think that this is a case in which a court of equity (assuming that it has jurisdiction to do so in the case of a director of a company) would order the repayment of the £5.2m. by Mr. Ward to Guinness subject to a condition that an equitable allowance be made to Mr. Ward for his services.

Finally, I cannot see any prospect of success in a claim by Mr. Ward to relief under section 727 of the Act of 1985. Given that Guinness's claim must be one for the recovery of money paid to Mr. Ward under a void contract and received by him as a constructive trustee, there is no question of his being able to claim relief from liability for breach of duty, as might have been the case if Guinness's claim had been founded upon breach by Mr. Ward of his duty of disclosure.

I have been very conscious, throughout this case, that Guinness is seeking summary judgment for the sum claimed by it, without any trial on the merits. Even so, I have come to the conclusion that Mr. Ward has no arguable defence to Guinness's claim. The simple fact emerges, at the end of the day, that there was, in law, no binding contract under which Mr. Ward was entitled to receive the money and that, as a fiduciary, he must now restore that money to Guinness. For these reasons, I would dismiss the appeal.

== See also ==
- Ex parte James (1803) 8 Ves 337, Lord Eldon, ‘This doctrine as to purchases by trustees, assignees, and persons having a confidential character, stands much more upon general principle than upon the circumstances of any individual case. It rests upon this, that the purchase is not permitted in any case, however honest the circumstances, the general interests of justice requiring it to be destroyed in every instance; as no court is equal to the examination and ascertainment of the truth in much the greater number of cases.’ (see also, Ex parte Lacey (1802) 6 Ves 625)
