= Renison =

Renison may refer to:

- Renison Bell, underground tin mine and locality on the West Coast of Tasmania, Australia
- Renison University College, is a public university college located in Waterloo, Ontario and affiliated with the University of Waterloo
  - Renison University College School of Social Work, one of the schools that compose the University of Waterloo
