= Albin Runesson =

Swedish ice hockey player

- Born: April 15, 1996 (age 29) Sweden
- Height: 5 ft 10 in (178 cm)
- Weight: 176 lb (80 kg; 12 st 8 lb)
- Position: Defence
- Shoots: Left
- Allsv team: Modo Hockey
- Playing career: 2014–present

Albin Runesson (born April 15, 1996) is a Swedish ice hockey defenceman. He is currently playing with Modo Hockey of the HockeyAllsvenskan (Allsv).

Runesson made his Swedish Hockey League debut playing with Modo Hockey during the 2014–15 SHL season.
