= Funke v. France =

Funke v. France was a legal case heard by the European Court of Human Rights (ECtHR) in September 1992, with the court publishing its judgement on 25 February 1993. The case was given to the Court in December 1991, the application had been made in February 1984, and related to events occurring in 1980.

== Background ==
Jean-Gustave Funke had brought a case against France, arguing that the nation had breached the European Convention on Human Rights. The demand that he produce documents was an attempt to compel self-incrimination and breached his right to silence (Article 6 paragraphs 1 and 2), and the search of his home was conducted without sufficient safeguards to prevent a breach of his right to privacy (Article 8). Following his death in July 1987, the case was continued by his wife Ruth.

Funke, in 1980 a resident of Lingolsheim, had been visited on 14 January of that year by three customs officers and an officier de police judiciaire. They were investigating tax evasion claims raised by government authorities in Metz. After questioning Funke they spent five and a half hours searching his home; a number of financial documents, a car-repair bill, and two cameras were seized.

The customs officials' seizures did not lead to proceedings in regard to the cause of their investigations (the possible breach of regulations concerning financial dealings with foreign countries), but did result in the officials demanding further document disclosure by Funke - of financial statements relating to specific accounts in the proceeding three years (1977-79) and to the purchase of a house in Schonach. Funke initially promised to provide the documents but shortly afterwards declined to do so.

In April 1982, customs authorities applied to the Strasbourg District Court for an attachment to Funke's property of 100,220 French franc (FRF). This was in part in lieu of the confiscation of undeclared funds, and in part for the payment of a fine due to breaches of the Custom Code. The court granted the order five days later.

== Legal challenges ==
Funke then began two separate legal challenges, one against the demand for document disclosure, and one against the attachment. The legal clash over the demand for documents was the case considered by the ECtHR.

In May 1982, Funke was summoned to the police court in Strasbourg. The customs authorities were demanding a fine, a daily incrementing penalty, and a term in prison for Funke due to his failure to cooperate without good reason. In September 1982, the court imposed a fine of 1,200 FRF on Funke and ordered that he deliver the requested bank documents or face a daily penalty (astreinte) of 20 FRF. Funke appealed the decision.

Funke's appeal was based on the ECHR Article 6 and Article 8. His arguments were dismissed by the Colmar Court of Appeal in March 1983 - a public authority can interfere with the rights "so long as it is in accordance with the law and ... is necessary in ... the interests of the economic well-being of the country or for the prevention of disorder or crime." The court increased the daily fine for non-compliance to 50 FRF. Funke appealed again and his case was dismissed by the Court of Cassation (Criminal Division) in November 1983, on identical grounds to the Colmar Court of Appeal.

== European Court of Human Rights ==
In February 1984 Funke applied to the ECtHR. He complained that his conviction for a refusal to produce documents was a breach of his right to a fair trial (Article 6-1), the initial demand was a violation of the right not to give evidence against oneself and the subsequent proceedings against him were an attempt to compel him, when the French government could have sought other means to obtain any documents. Funke also held that the trial was not held within a reasonable time (6-1) and did not regard the presumption of innocence (6-2). He also claimed that the search was a breach of his right to respect for his privacy (Article 8).

In the interim Funke refused to pay the pecuniary penalty for non-compliance and in January 1985 a garnishment notice was served to retrieve 10,750 FRF from Funke's bank account, covering fines for May-December 1984. He contested this decision at the Strasbourg District Court in March 1985. That court upheld the notice but Funke appealed. In February 1989 the Colmar Court of Appeal reversed the decision of the district court and removed the notice. The custom authorities appealed this decision on points of law to the Court of Cassation, which upheld the decision that a garnishment notice could not be used for customs penalties.

=== Verdict ===
The application to the ECtHR was accepted as admissible in October 1988 and the Commission reported in October 1991. They expressed the opinion that there had been no breach of 6-1 (7-5 on fair trial and 8-4 on timely proceedings), no breach of 6-2 (9-3), and no breach of 8-1 or 8-2 (4-4, with the President using a casting vote).

The Court agreed that the initial request for documents and the subsequent penalties were not unreasonable or contrary to the right of a fair trial - the request was a balanced part of a declaratory regime which saved individuals from strict and systematic investigation in return for their accepting certain duties and requirements; the subsequent penalties were a consequence of the refusal to cooperate.

However the Court decided that the customs authorities using the conviction of Funke in order to compel him to produce documents they believed to exist, without trying to procure the documents by other means, was a breach of Article 6-1. Despite the Custom Code allowing the authorities' actions, they were clear infringement of the individual's right to remain silent and not to contribute to incriminating himself. The Court saw no need to also investigate if there had been a breach of 6-2, relating to the presumption of innocence or if the interim orders had been made within a reasonable time.

The Court also found that the French government had breached Article 8-1 in respect to Funke's right to "respect for his private... life, his home and his correspondence," but that the breaches were reasonable under 8-2 as the Custom code had been tightened by case-law and subsequently amended (reform of 1986-89), further there was no requirement in the Convention disputing the ex post facto supervision of searches. There had however been a breach under Article 8 due to the lack of sufficient safeguards in the Custom Code legislation to prevent disproportionate interference in an individual's rights.

The Court awarded the applicant 50,000 FRF for non-pecuniary damages (Article 50) and 70,000 FRF towards his legal costs.

The Court decisions were by majority. There had been a breach of Funke's right to a fair trial (8-1 Article 6-1); that the other complaints under Article 6 should not be examined (8-1); and there had been a breach of Funke's right to privacy (8-1, Article 8).
