= Christopher Reginald Reeves =

British banker

Christopher Reginald Reeves (14 January 1936 – 20 November 2007) was a British banker who helped transform Morgan Grenfell from a conservative City bank into a major force in international finance.

== Life ==
After receiving his education at Malvern College, Reeves did National Service with the Rifle Brigade in Kenya and Malaya.

He joined the Bank of England in 1958, moving to Hill Samuel in 1963 where he worked closely with his mentor Lord Keith.

It is widely recognised that Reeves played a central role in the transformation of Morgan Grenfell and Merrill Lynch, both prominent City of London investment banks, from conservative to meritocratic institutions. In his Times obituary, it was stated that he was "one of the more talented international investment bankers of his generation", a leading member of "a new breed of driven, ambitious professionals who shook up the City in the 1980s."

Reeves joined Morgan Grenfell in 1968 and became group chief executive in 1980. After resigning from Morgan Grenfell, he was appointed senior adviser to the president of Merrill Lynch Capital Markets and, eventually, was appointed vice-chairman and then chairman of Merrill Lynch Europe, Middle East & Africa.
