= Gerald Ronson =

British businessman and criminal (born 1939)

Sir Gerald Ronson CBE
- Born: Gerald Maurice Ronson; 27 May 1939 (age 87); Paddington, London
- Occupation: CEO of Heron International
- Known for: Heron International
- Spouse: Dame Gail Ronson
- Children: 4

Sir Gerald Maurice Ronson CBE (born 27 May 1939) is a British businessman, philanthropist, and convicted criminal. In the 1980s, he was one of the 'Guinness Four' involved in a trading fraud, for which he served six month in prison. He is a long-time supporter of Jewish charities, and was knighted for this charitable work in the UK's 2024 New Years Honours List.

== Early life and career ==
Gerald Maurice Ronson was born on 27 May 1939 into a middle-class Jewish family. He left school aged 15 to join his father in the family furniture business, named Heron after his father Henry. The company expanded into property development, at first with small residential projects, and later with commercial and office properties. By 1967, the company was active in seven European countries and fifty-two British municipalities. In the mid-1960s, Ronson brought the first self-service petrol retail outlets to the United Kingdom.

== Heron International ==
By the early 1980s Heron was one of the largest private companies in the United Kingdom, with assets of over £1.5 billion. In 1989, Ronson was listed by The Times as having a net worth of £500 million.

Ronson said that "The Ronson family lost $1 billion of its own money in the property crash of the early 1990s....the important thing was to rebuild." By the 1990s Heron had almost collapsed, with over £1 billion owed to 11,000 bondholders. The company survived with loans from Bill Gates, Rupert Murdoch, Craig McCaw, Oracle Corporation's founder, Larry Ellison, and others, and went on to develop projects including Heron Tower and The Heron in the City of London and The Peak in London's Victoria.

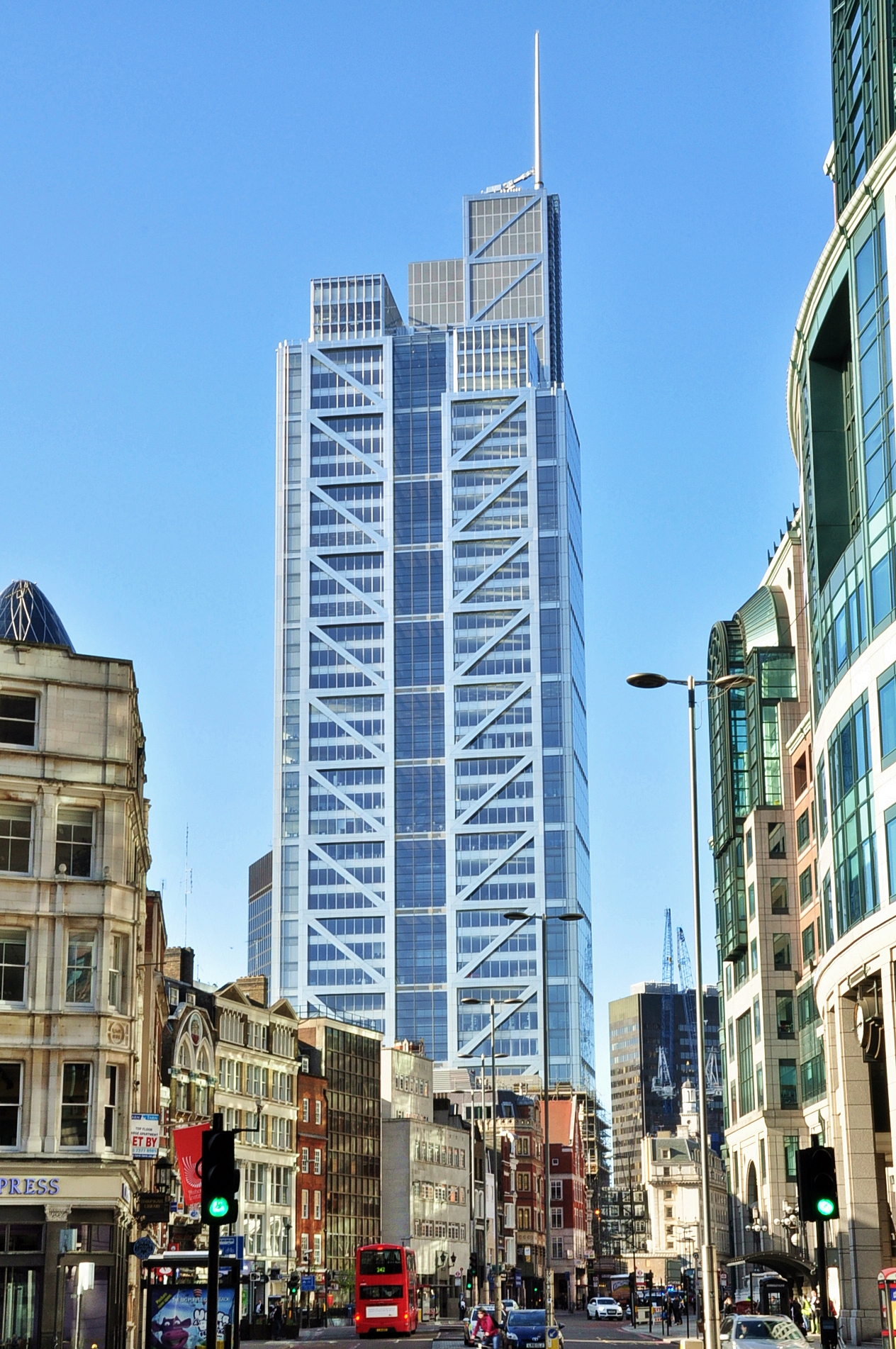
Heron Tower, London

Ronson's later additional business ventures included Ronson Capital Partners, an investment firm he established to invest opportunistically in real estate assets in the UK; and Rontec Investments, a consortium comprising Snax 24, Investec and Grovepoint Capital, created to acquire the assets of Total Oil UK.

== Criminal conviction and the "Guinness Four" ==
Ronson was known in the UK as one of the Guinness Four for his involvement in the Guinness share-trading fraud of the 1980s. He was convicted in August 1990 of one charge of conspiracy, two of false accounting, and one of theft. He was fined £5 million and given a one-year jail sentence, of which he served six months. In 2000, the European Court of Human Rights ruled that use of statements made to inspectors in the 1990 trial had been unfair, but rejected five other complaints and denied a costs application. An appeal to the Court of Appeal Criminal Division, seeking to have the Human Rights Act 1998 applied retrospectively, failed in 2001. A final appeal to the House of Lords failed in 2002. No further appeal was possible and the convictions were upheld.

== Philanthropy ==
Gerald Ronson is a long-time supporter of Jewish and other charitable causes. He is the Founding Chairman of the Jewish Community Security Trust, Vice-president of the NSPCC and President of JCoSS.

Ronson won City AM's Personality of the Year Award in September 2011 and other awards. In 2009, Juan Carlos I of Spain bestowed the Encomienda de Numero of the Spanish Order of Civil Merit Decoration on Ronson. In the same year, he was awarded an Honorary Doctorate of Civil Law by Northumbria University.

Ronson was appointed Commander of the Order of the British Empire (CBE) in the 2012 New Year Honours list for charitable services. He was knighted in the 2024 New Year Honours for services to philanthropy and to the Jewish community.

== Personal life ==
Ronson is married to philanthropist and socialite Dame Gail Ronson. They have four daughters. He is the uncle of record producer Mark Ronson.

When asked about his family and Jewish heritage in an interview with the Jewish Telegraph, Ronson responded: "I am a proud Jew [...] when I go back to when I was a young boy, nothing has changed and that's how I look at the Ronson family, involved in school building, whether it be Israel, the Jewish Leadership Council, Jewish Care or most of the major organisations I've been involved in".
