= Croydon =

Town in South London, England

Coordinates: 51°22′25″N 0°6′1″W

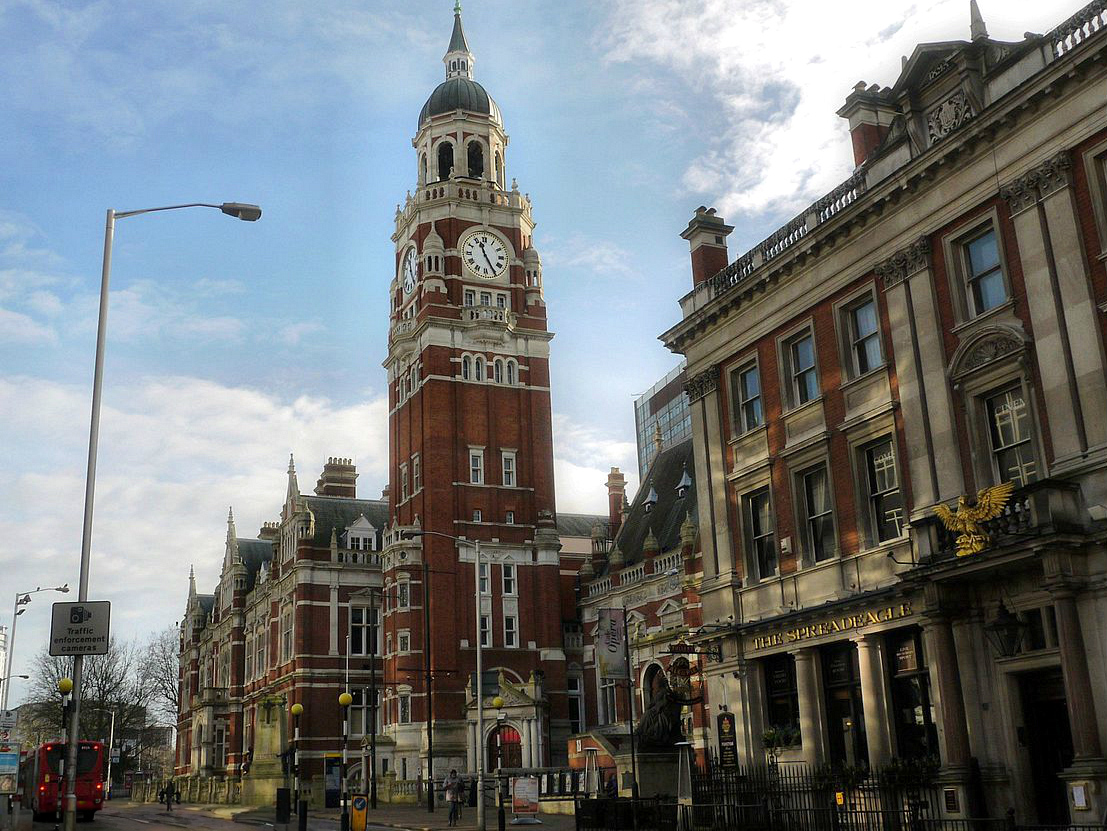
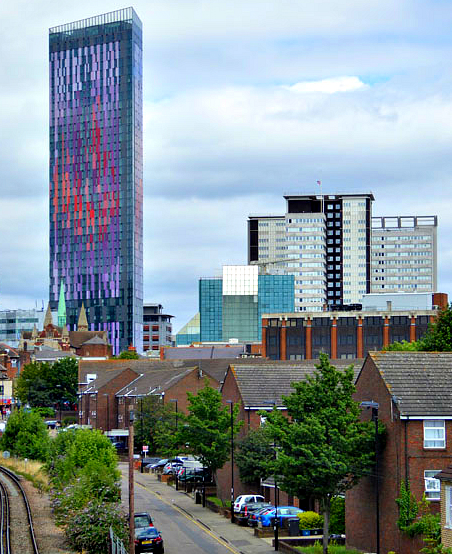
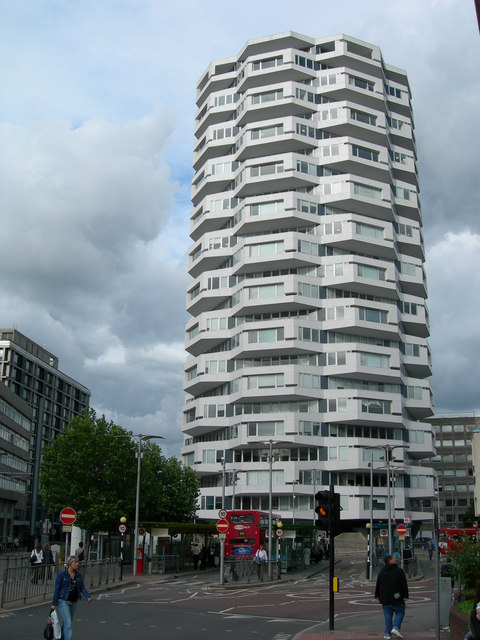
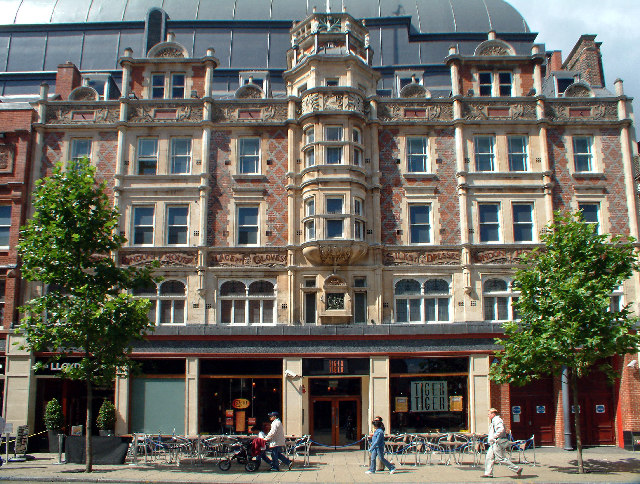
- Clockwise from top: the Old Town Hall and Clocktower (with the Spreadeagle in the foreground), Katharine Street; No. 1 Croydon building; the Grants Building, High Street; Saffron Square and other blocks

- Location within Greater London
- Population: 192,064 (2011 census)
- OS grid reference: TQ323656
  - Charing Cross: 9.3 mi (15.0 km) N
- London borough: Croydon
- Ceremonial county: Greater London
- Region: London
- Country: England
- Sovereign state: United Kingdom
- Post town: CROYDON
- Postcode district: CR0
- Dialling code: 020; 01689 (Addington and New Addington parts)
- Police: Metropolitan
- Fire: London
- Ambulance: London
- UK Parliament: Croydon East; Croydon West; Croydon South; Streatham and Croydon North
- London Assembly: Croydon and Sutton

Croydon is a large town in South London, England, 9.3 miles (15 km) south of Charing Cross. Part of the London Borough of Croydon, a local government district of Greater London; it is one of the largest commercial districts in Greater London, with an extensive shopping area. The entire town had a population of 192,064 as of 2011, whilst the wider borough had a population of 384,837.

Historically an ancient parish in the Wallington Hundred of Surrey, at the time of the Norman Conquest of England, Croydon had a church, a mill, and around 365 inhabitants, as recorded in the Domesday Book of 1086. Croydon expanded in the Middle Ages as a market town and a centre for charcoal production, leather tanning and brewing, with the brewing industry in particular remaining strong for hundreds of years. The Surrey Iron Railway from Croydon to Wandsworth opened in 1803 and was an early public railway. Later 19th century railway building facilitated Croydon's growth as a commuter town for London. By the early 20th century, Croydon was an important industrial area, known for car manufacture, metalworking and Croydon Airport. In the mid 20th century these sectors were replaced by retailing and the service economy, brought about by massive redevelopment which saw the rise of office blocks and the Whitgift Centre, the largest shopping centre in Greater London until 2008. Historically, the town formed part of the County of Surrey, and between 1889 and 1965 a county borough, but it was amalgamated into Greater London in 1965.

Croydon lies on a transport corridor between central London and the south coast of England, to the north of two high gaps in the North Downs, one taken by the A23 Brighton Road and the main railway line through Purley and Merstham and the other by the A22 from Purley to the M25 Godstone interchange. Road traffic is diverted away from a largely pedestrianised town centre, mostly consisting of North End. East Croydon railway station is a hub of the national railway system, with frequent fast services to central London, Brighton and the south coast. The town is also at the centre of the only tramway system in Southern England.

== Toponymy ==
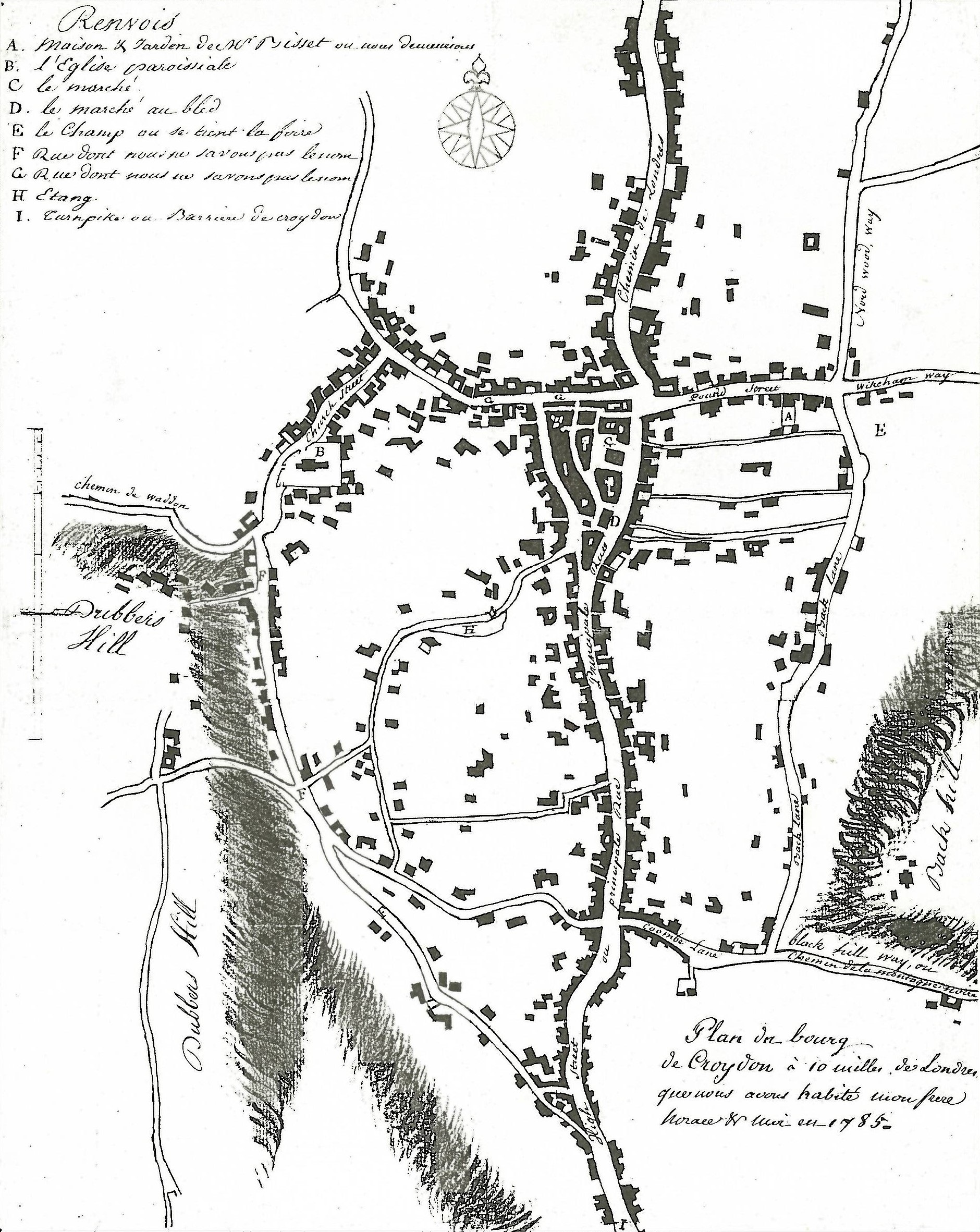
The earliest detailed map of Croydon, drawn by the 18-year-old Jean-Baptiste Say in 1785. The early settlement of Old Town, including the parish church (marked B) lies to the west; while the triangular medieval marketplace, probably associated with Archbishop Kilwardby's market charter of 1276, is clearly visible further east, although by this date it has been infilled with buildings.

As the vast majority of place names in the area are of Anglo-Saxon origin, the theory accepted by most philologists is that the name Croydon derives originally from the Old English croh, meaning "crocus", and denu, "valley", indicating that, like Saffron Walden in Essex, it was a centre for the cultivation of saffron. It has been argued that this cultivation is likely to have taken place in the Roman period, when the saffron crocus would have been grown to supply the London market, most probably for medicinal purposes, and particularly for the treatment of granulation of the eyelids.

Alternative, but less probable, derivations have been proposed. Andrew Coltee Ducarel suggested that the name came from the Old French for "chalk hill". John Corbet Anderson refuted this on the grounds that the name was in use at least a century before the Norman Conquest, which is when the French language began to be commonly used in England.

Anderson himself proposed that the name might mean a "crooked valley":

The earliest mention of Croydon is in the joint will of Beorhtric and Aelfswth, dated about the year 962. In this Anglo-Saxon document the name is spelt [here he uses Old English characters], Crogdaene. Crog was, and still is, the Norse or Danish word for crooked, which is expressed in Anglo-Saxon by crumb, a totally different word. From the Danish came our crook and crooked. This term accurately describes the locality; it is a crooked or winding valley, in reference to the valley that runs in an oblique and serpentine course from Godstone to Croydon.

However, there was no long-term Danish occupation in Surrey, which was part of Wessex, and Danish-derived nomenclature is also highly unlikely.

More recently, David Bird, while accepting the derivation from the word crocus, has speculated that this might actually be a personal name, Crocus. He suggests a family connection with the documented Chrocus, king of the Alemanni, who allegedly played a part in the proclamation of Constantine as emperor at York in AD 306.

== History ==
=== Early history ===
The town lies on the line of the Roman road from London to Portslade, and there is some archaeological evidence for small-scale Roman settlement in the area: there may have been a mansio (staging-post) here. Later, in the 5th to 7th centuries, a large pagan Saxon cemetery was situated on what is now Park Lane, although the extent of any associated settlement is unknown.

By the late Saxon period Croydon was the hub of an estate belonging to the Archbishops of Canterbury. The church and the archbishops' manor house were situated in the area still known as "Old Town". The archbishops used the manor house as an occasional place of residence: as lords of the manor they dominated the life of the town well into the early modern period, and as local patrons they continue to have an influence. The earliest known mention of Croydon is in a Saxon chronicle of 809, where the name is spelt Crogeden (the modern spelling did not appear until the 13th century). Croydon appears in Domesday Book (1086) as Croindene, held by Archbishop Lanfranc. Its Domesday assets included 16 hides and 1 virgate of land; a church; a mill worth 5s; 38 plough-teams; 8 acres (3.2 ha) of meadow; and woodland for 200 hogs. It had a recorded population of 73 households (representing roughly 365 individuals); and its value in terms of taxes rendered was £37 10s 0d.

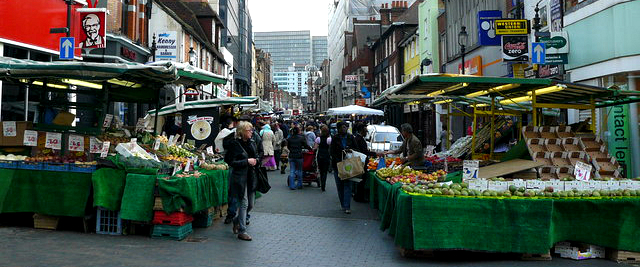
Surrey Street Market, the successor to the market first granted a charter in 1276

The church had been established in the middle Saxon period, and was probably a minster church, a base for a group of clergy living a communal life. A charter issued by King Coenwulf of Mercia refers to a council that had taken place close to the monasterium (meaning minster) of Croydon. An Anglo-Saxon will made in about 960 is witnessed by Elfsies, priest of Croydon; and the church is also mentioned in Domesday Book. The will of John de Croydon, fishmonger, dated 6 December 1347, includes a bequest to "the church of S John de Croydon", the earliest clear record of its dedication. The church still bears the arms of Archbishop Courtenay and Archbishop Chichele, believed to have been its benefactors.

In 1264, the only battle reputed to have been fought in Croydon is said to have occurred. Following the defeat of Henry III at the Battle of Lewes, a London contingent was reportedly intercepted at Norbury by Royalist troops from Tonbridge and killed. One account suggests that the king’s forces lay in ambush in Norwood Forest and that the clash took place near Hermitage Bridge, close to an enclosure long known as Battle Close. However, this interpretation is based on later tradition rather than contemporary documentary evidence.

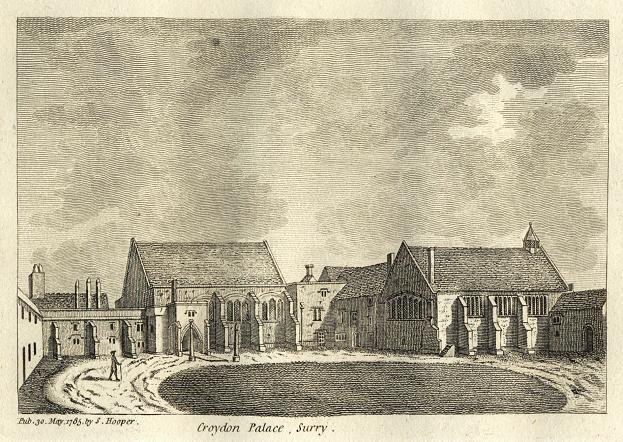
Croydon Palace in c.1785

In 1276 Archbishop Robert Kilwardby acquired a charter for a weekly market, and this probably marks the foundation of Croydon as an urban centre. Croydon developed into one of the main market towns of north-east Surrey. The market place was laid out on the higher ground to the east of the manor house in the triangle now bounded by High Street, Surrey Street and Crown Hill. By the 16th century the manor house had become a substantial palace, used as the main summer home of the archbishops and visited by monarchs and other dignitaries. However, the palace gradually became dilapidated and surrounded by slums and stagnant ponds, and in 1781 the archbishops sold it, and in its place purchased a new residence at nearby Addington. Nevertheless, many of the buildings of the original Croydon Palace survive, having been occupied from 1889 to 2025 by Old Palace School.

Croydon had numerous inns from at least the 15th century. The oldest of these was the Greyhound, which occupied a site on the High Street from at least 1493 until it was demolished in 1962 to make way for St George’s Walk, although the building itself had been rebuilt over time. The inn had previously stood in Old Town before relocating to the present town centre alongside the wider trading community. Among its notable guests was General Sir Thomas Fairfax, the Parliamentarian commander during the English Civil War, who used the inn as his headquarters while his troops were billeted in the town between 1645 and 1647. In 1926, the Greyhound also became home to the Greyhound Theatre, described at the time as the smallest theatre in Croydon. Using the hotel’s ballroom and stage, it ran a repertory season (mainly comedies) from April to October, presenting weekly productions, many of which had previously been successful in the West End. Ticket prices ranged from 1s 2d to 3s 6d. In July 1928 the Croydon Repertory Association was formed to support the theatre, and its membership grew from a small initial group to more than 3,000 by the start of the 1930 season. The company remained at the Greyhound until 1932, when it relocated to 23 Wellesley Road, at the junction with Poplar Walk, where it reopened as the Croydon Repertory Theatre.

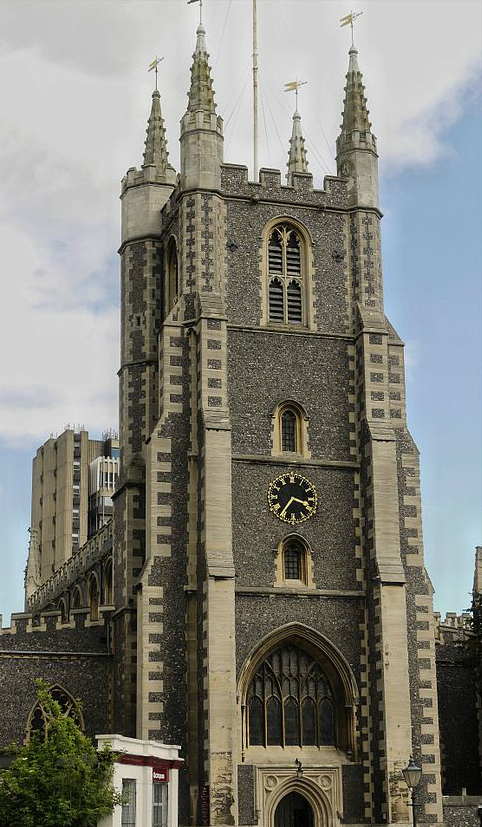
The Grade I listed Croydon Minster parish church

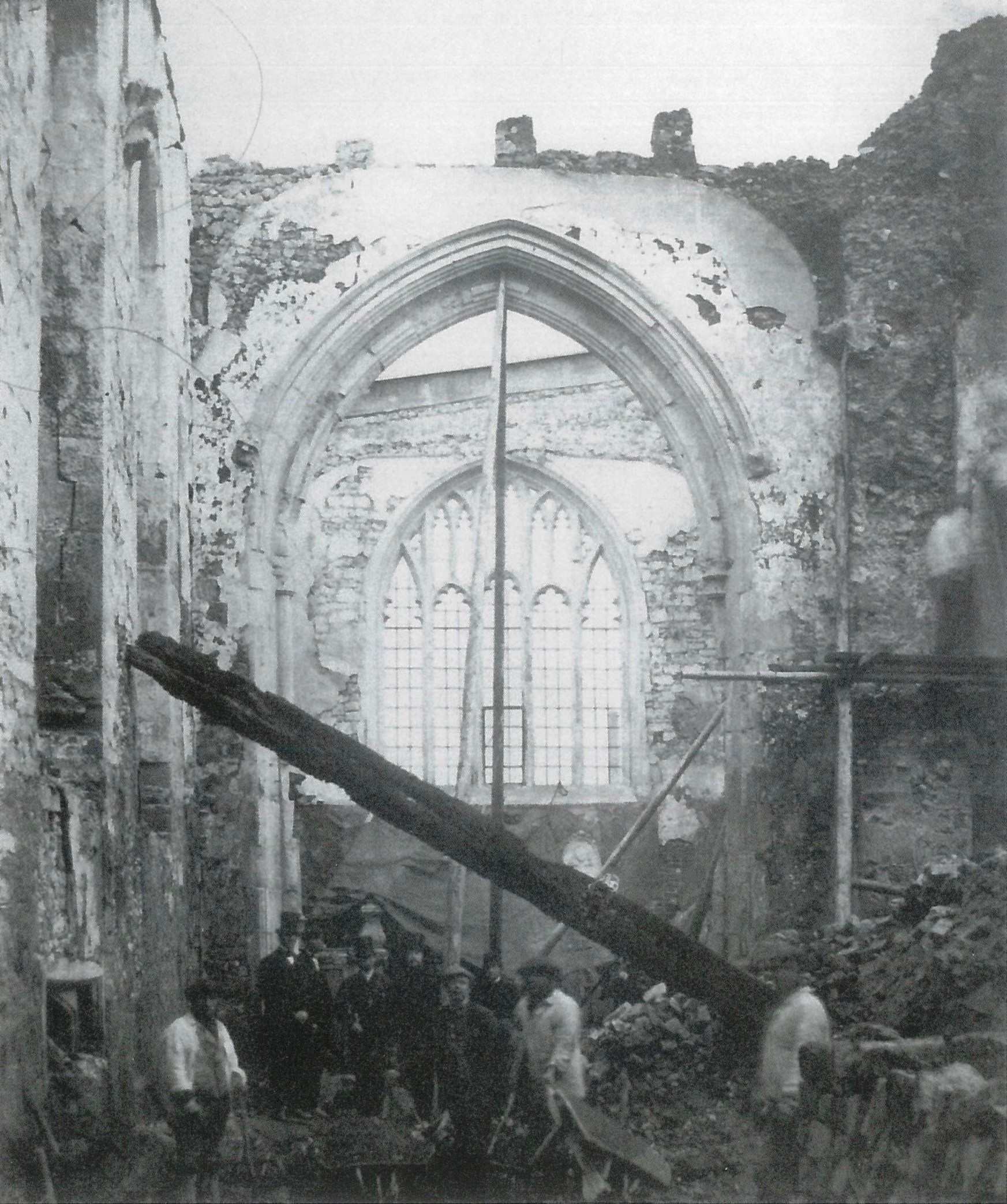
The ruins of the church, following its destruction in 1867: the north chancel aisle looking east

The parish church (now Croydon Minster) is a Perpendicular-style church, remodelled in the 1850s but destroyed in a great fire in 1867, after which only the tower, south porch, and outer walls remained. A new church was designed by Sir George Gilbert Scott, one of the greatest architects of the Victorian age, and opened in 1870. His design loosely followed the previous layout, with knapped flint facing and retaining many of the original features, including several tombs. The church is the burial place of six Archbishops of Canterbury: John Whitgift, Edmund Grindal, Gilbert Sheldon, William Wake, John Potter and Thomas Herring. Historically part of the Diocese of Canterbury, Croydon is now in the Diocese of Southwark. In addition to the suffragan Bishop of Croydon, the Vicar of Croydon is a preferment.

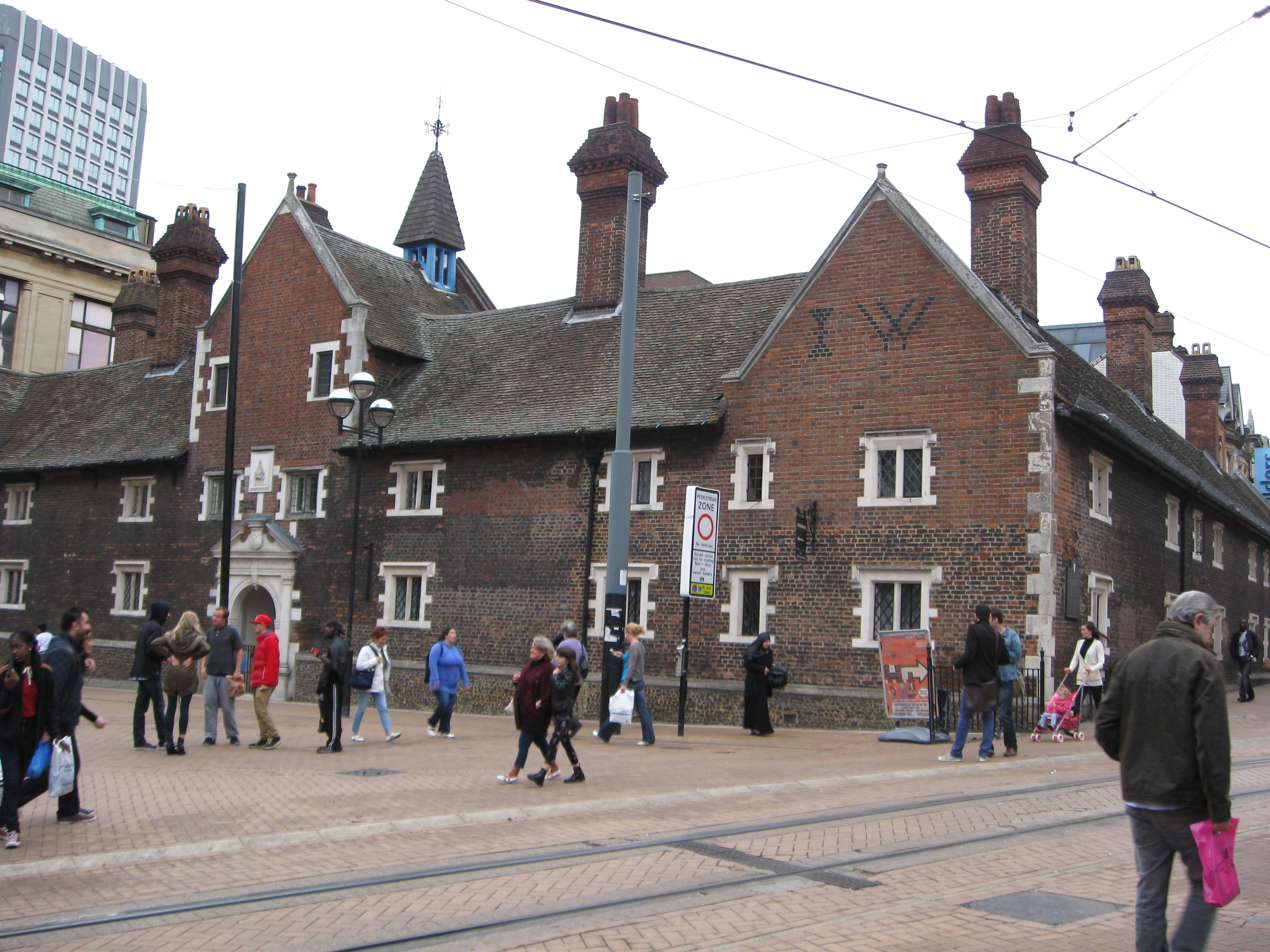
The Grade I listed "Whitgift Hospital" almshouses in the centre of Croydon

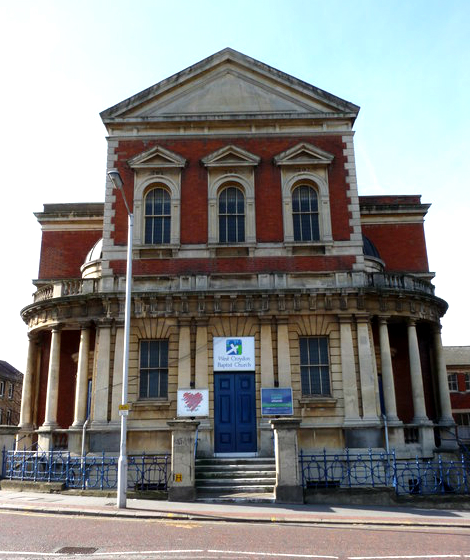
The Grade II listed West Croydon Baptist Church

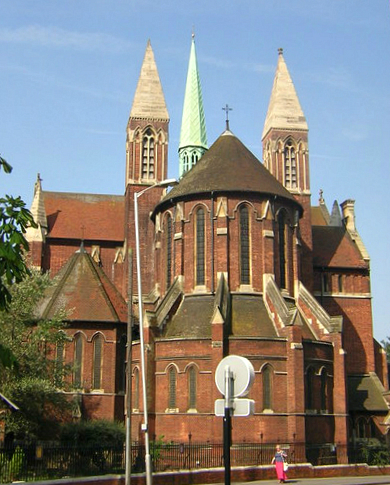
The Grade I listed Parish Church of St Michael and All Angels, West Croydon

Addington Palace is a Palladian-style mansion between Addington Village and Shirley, in the London Borough of Croydon. Six archbishops lived there between 1807 and 1898, when it was sold. Between 1953 and 1996 it was the home of the Royal School of Church Music. It is now a conference and banqueting venue.

Croydon was home to the Addiscombe Military Seminary (1809–1861), at which young officers were trained for the army of the East India Company.

Croydon was a leisure destination in the mid 19th century. In 1831, one of England's most prominent architects, Decimus Burton, designed a spa and pleasure gardens below Beulah Hill and off what is now Spa Hill in a bowl of land on the south-facing side of the hill around a spring of chalybeate water. Burton was responsible for the Beulah Spa Hotel (demolished around 1935) and the layout of the grounds. Its official title was The Royal Beulah Spa and Gardens. It became a popular society venue attracting crowds to its fêtes. One widely publicised event was a "Grand Scottish Fete" on 16 September 1834 "with a tightrope performance by Pablo Fanque, the black circus performer who would later dominate the Victorian circus and achieve immortality in the Beatles song, Being for the Benefit of Mr. Kite!" The spa closed in 1856 soon after the opening nearby of the Crystal Palace which had been rebuilt on Sydenham Hill in 1854, following its success at the Great Exhibition in Hyde Park.

Horse racing in the area took place occasionally, notably during visits of Queen Elizabeth I to the archbishop. Regular meetings became established first on a course at Park Hill in 1860 and from 1866 at Woodside, where particularly good prizes were offered for the races run under National Hunt rules. In that sphere its prestige was second only to Aintree, home of the Grand National. Increasing local opposition to the presence of allegedly unruly racegoers coupled with the need to obtain a licence from the local authority led to it being closed down in 1890.

The Elizabethan Whitgift Almshouses, the "Hospital of the Holy Trinity", in the centre of Croydon at the corner of North End and George Street, were erected by Archbishop John Whitgift. He petitioned for and received permission from Queen Elizabeth I to establish a hospital and school in Croydon for the "poor, needy and impotent people" from the parishes of Croydon and Lambeth. The foundation stone was laid in 1596 and the building was completed in 1599.

The premises included the Hospital or Almshouses, providing accommodation for between 28 and 40 people, and a nearby schoolhouse and schoolmaster's house. There was a Warden in charge of the well-being of the almoners. The building takes the form of a courtyard surrounded by the chambers of the almoners and various offices.

Threatened by various reconstruction plans and road-widening schemes, the Almshouses were saved in 1923 by intervention of the House of Lords. On 21 June 1983, Queen Elizabeth II visited the Almshouses and unveiled a plaque celebrating the recently completed reconstruction of the building. On 22 March each year the laying of the foundation stone is commemorated as Founder's Day.

In 1864, the Catholic St Mary's Church in Croydon was opened. It was designed by E. W. Pugin and Frederick Walters in the Gothic Revival style. The Grade II listed West Croydon Baptist Church was built in 1873 by J. Theodore Barker. It is a red brick building with stone dressings. Its three bays are divided by paired Doric pilasters supporting a triglyph frieze and panelled parapet. The Parish Church of St Michael and All Angels by John Loughborough Pearson in West Croydon was built between 1880 and 1885, and is Grade I listed.

=== Industrial Revolution and the railway ===
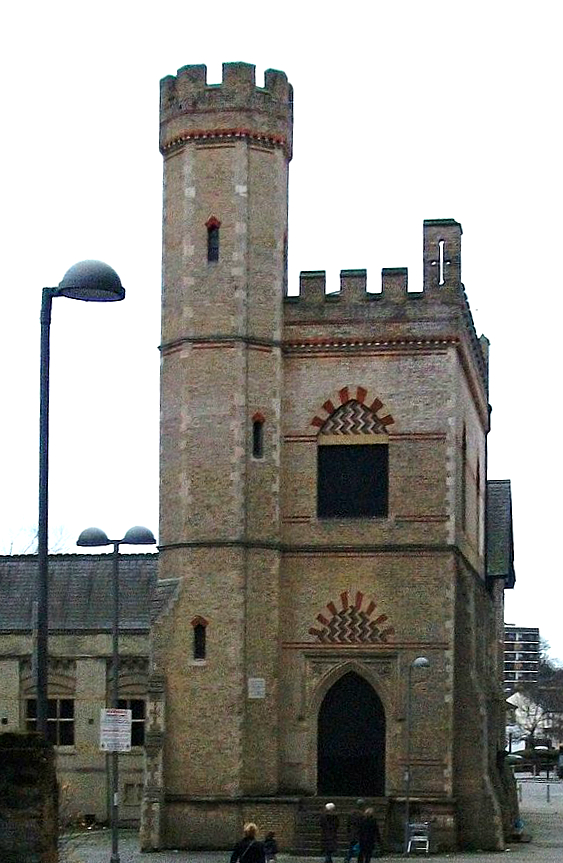
The Grade II listed Surrey Street Pumping Station, Croydon

The development of Brighton as a fashionable resort in the 1780s increased Croydon's importance as a halt for stage coaches on the road south of London. At the beginning of the 19th century, Croydon became the terminus of two pioneering commercial transport links with London. The first, opened in 1803, was the horse-drawn Surrey Iron Railway from Wandsworth, which in 1805 was extended to Merstham, as the Croydon, Merstham and Godstone Railway. The second, opened in 1809, was the Croydon Canal, which branched off the Grand Surrey Canal at Deptford. The London and Croydon Railway (an atmospheric and steam-powered railway) opened between London Bridge and West Croydon in 1839, using much of the route of the canal (which had closed in 1836). Other connections to London and the south followed.

The arrival of the railways and other communications advances in the 19th century led to a 23-fold increase in Croydon's population between 1801 and 1901. This rapid expansion of the town led to considerable health problems, especially in the damp and overcrowded working class district of Old Town. In response to this, in 1849 Croydon became one of the first towns in the country to acquire a local board of health. The Board constructed public health infrastructure including a reservoir, water supply network, sewers, a pumping station and sewage disposal works. The Surrey Street Pumping Station is Grade II listed; it was built in four phases. starting with the engine house in 1851, with a further engine house in 1862, a further extension in 1876–7 to house a compound horizontal engine and a further extension in 1912.

=== A growing town ===
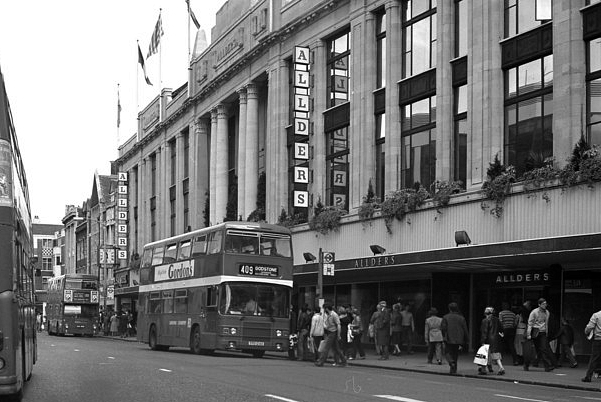
The Allders building in 1983

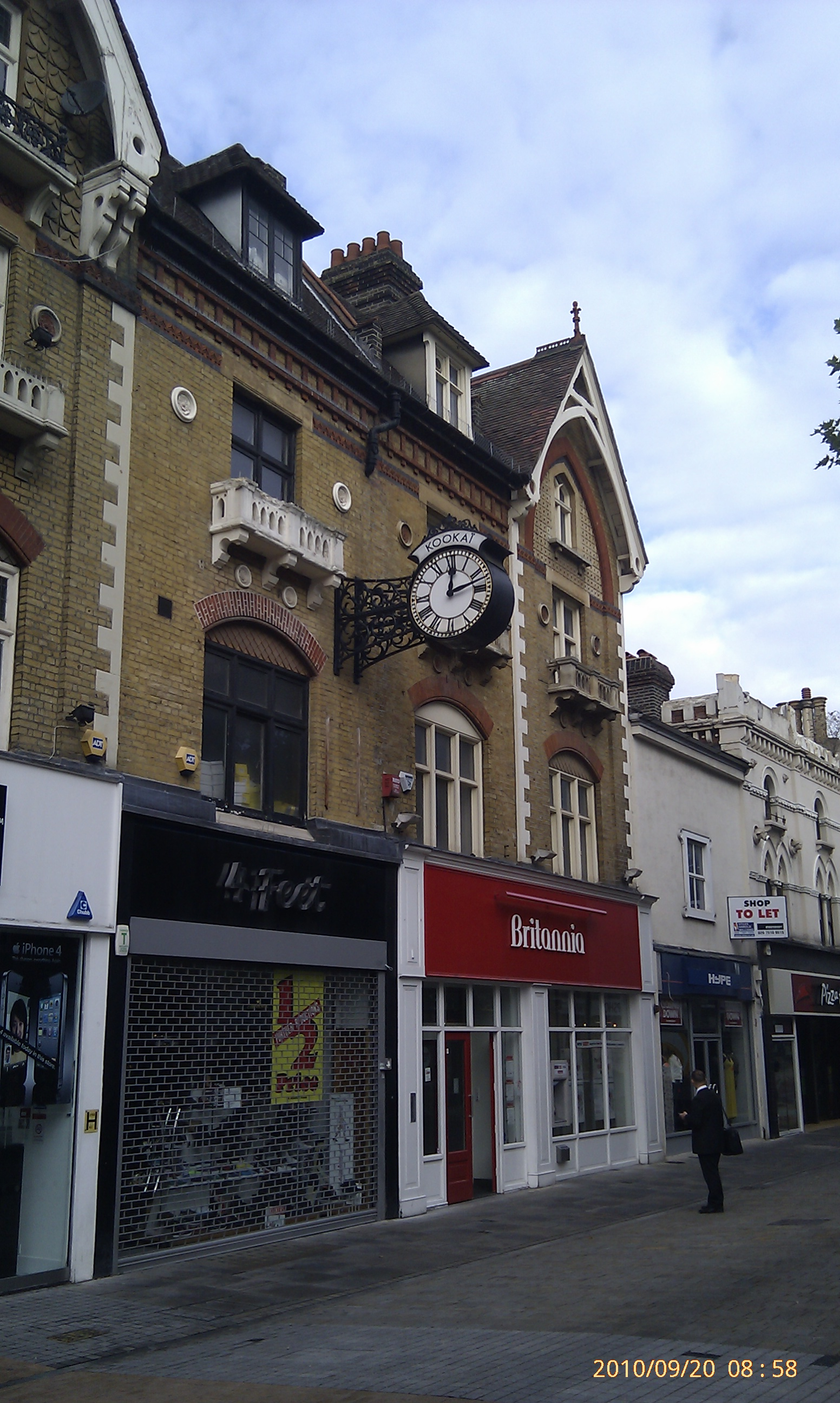
Shopping parade in North End, Croydon

In 1883 Croydon was incorporated as a borough. In 1889 it became a county borough, with a greater degree of autonomy. The new county borough council implemented the Croydon Improvement scheme in the early 1890s, which widened the High Street and cleared much of the "Middle Row" slum area. The remaining slums were cleared shortly after Second World War, with much of the population relocated to the isolated new settlement of New Addington. New stores opened and expanded in central Croydon, including Allders, Kennards and Grade II listed Grants, as well as the first Sainsbury's self-service shop in the country. There was a market on Surrey Street.

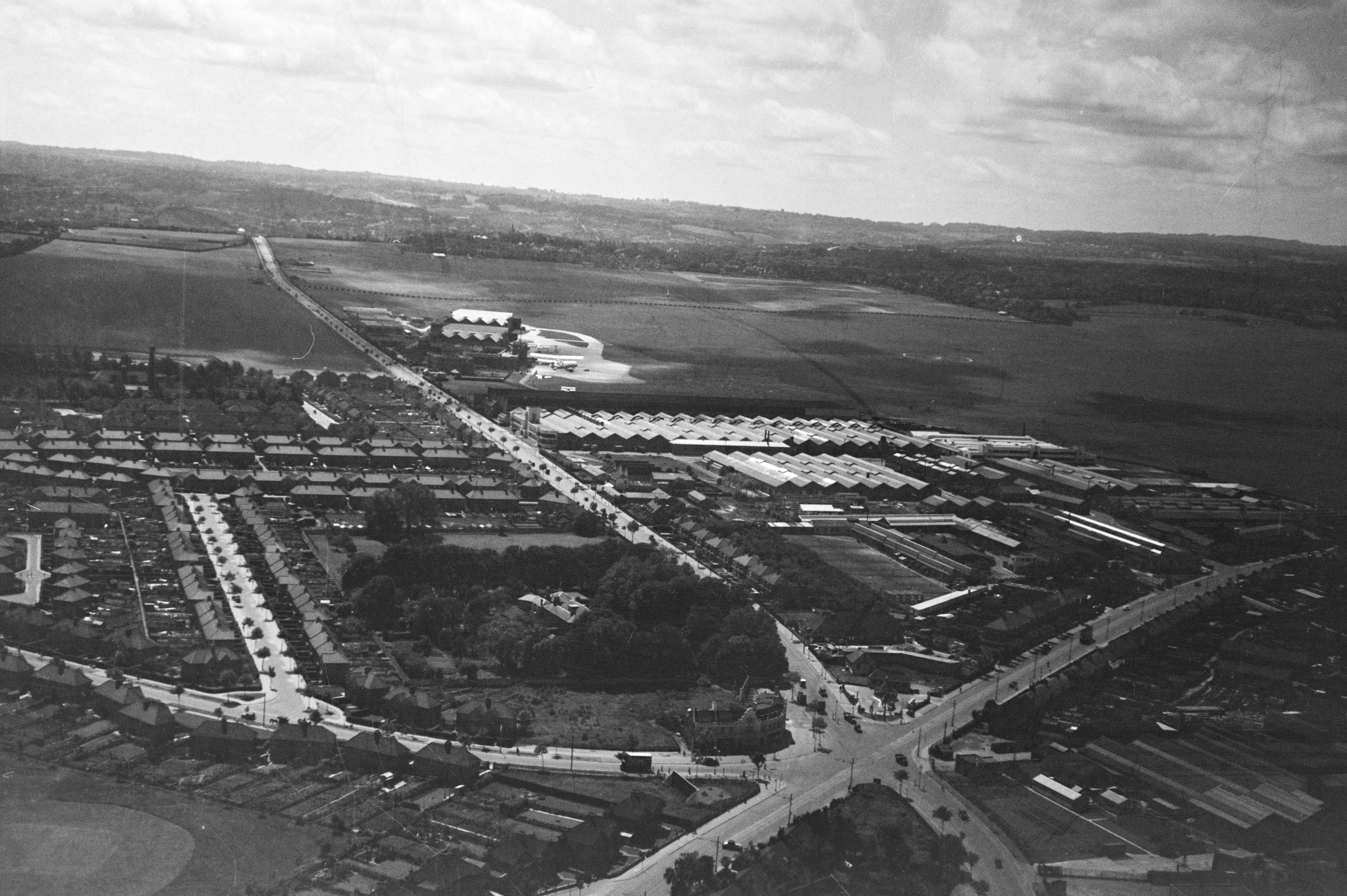
A photo of Croydon Airport in the 1930s

Croydon was the location of London's main airport until the Second World War. During the war, much of central Croydon was devastated by German V-1 flying bombs and V-2 rockets, and for many years the town bore the scars of the destruction. After the war, Heathrow Airport superseded Croydon Airport as London's main airport, and Croydon Airport quickly went into a decline, finally closing in 1959.

By the 1950s, with its continuing growth, the town was becoming congested, and the Council decided on another major redevelopment scheme. The Croydon Corporation Act was passed in 1956. This, coupled with national government incentives for office relocation out of Central London, led to the building of new offices and accompanying road schemes through the late 1950s and 1960s, and the town boomed as a business centre in the 1960s, with many multi-storey office blocks, an underpass, a flyover and multi-storey car parks. The redeveloped town centre has since been identified as an "edge city" – a significant urban and commercial centre in its own right, located on the outskirts of a larger metropolitan area (in this case, London).

In 1960 Croydon celebrated its millennium with events held at Ashburton Park and Lloyd Park. An exhibition was also held at the old Croydon Aerodrome.

=== Modern Croydon ===
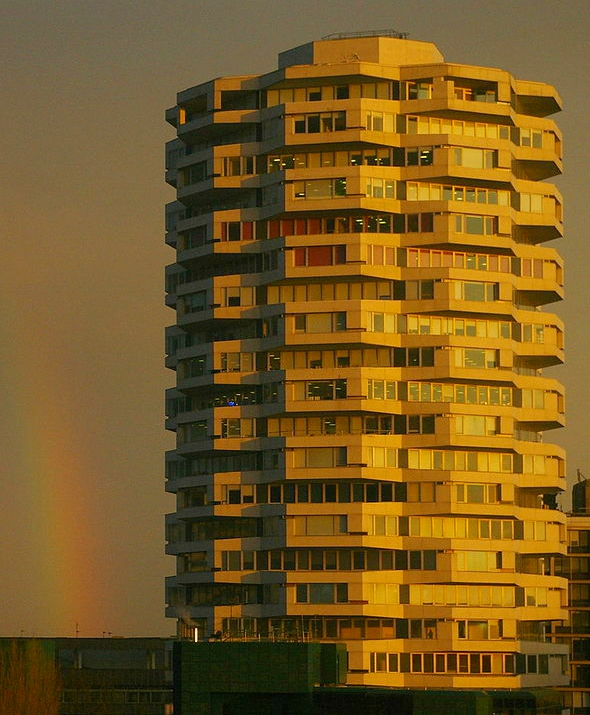
No. 1 Croydon, formerly the NLA Tower.

The growing town attracted many new buildings. The Fairfield Halls arts centre and event venue opened in 1962. Croydon developed as an important centre for shopping, with the construction of the Whitgift Centre in 1969. No. 1 Croydon (formerly the NLA Tower) designed by Richard Seifert & Partners was completed in 1970. The Warehouse Theatre opened in 1977.

The 1990s saw further changes intended to give the town a more attractive image. These included the closure of North End to vehicles in 1989 and the opening of the Croydon Clocktower arts centre in 1994. An early success of the centre was the "Picasso's Croydon Period" exhibition of March–May 1995.

The Croydon Tramlink began operation in May 2000 (see Transport section below).

The Prospect West office development was built in 1991 to 1992, and its remodelling planned in 2012 has now been completed. Renamed Interchange Croydon when it was reopened in 2014, the 180,000 square foot office development was the first new grade A office development of its size to open in Croydon for more than 20 years.

Another large shopping centre, Centrale, opened in 2004 opposite the Whitgift Centre, and adjoining the smaller Drummond Centre. House of Fraser and Debenhams are the anchor stores in the combined centre. In addition, there are plans for a large, new one billion pound shopping centre, in the form of a new Westfield shopping mall to add to the two which the company currently has in Greater London; Westfield plans to work jointly with Hammerson and to incorporate the best aspects of the two companies' designs. In November 2017, Croydon Council gave permission for the new Westfield shopping centre to be built and in January 2018, the Mayor of London, Sadiq Khan, approved the regeneration scheme. Work to demolish the existing Whitgift Centre was due to begin in 2018 and Westfield Croydon was initially to open by 2022. The Westfield plans were delayed and the planning permission elapsed: however, in 2021, Croydon Council confirmed they were committed to see the Westfield Centre proceed. There are several other major plans for the town including the redevelopment of the Croydon Gateway site; and extensions of Tramlink to Purley Way, Streatham, Lewisham and Crystal Palace.

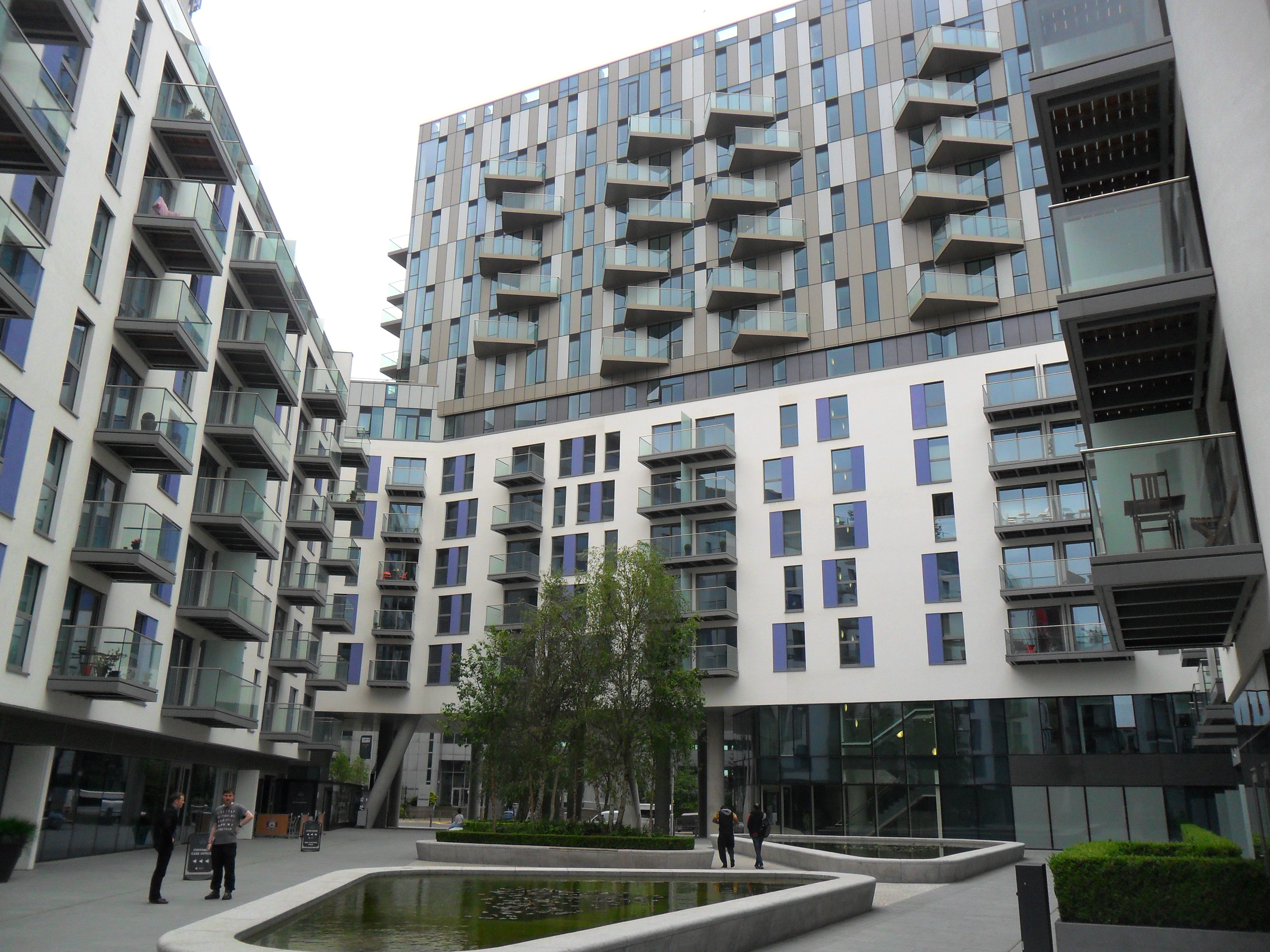
Saffron Square luxury apartment development

Croydon has many tall buildings such as the former Nestlé Tower (St George's House). The London Borough of Croydon's strategic planning committee in February 2013 gave the go-ahead to property fund manager Legal and General Property's plans to convert the empty 24-storey St George's House office building, occupied by Nestlé until September 2012, into 288 flats.

In 2007, events were held under the label of Croydon Exp07 to promote billions of pounds of promised projects, including swimming pools and a library. However, plans for a new shopping centre, to be called Park Place, had already been abandoned amid a scandal about cash for peerages. Also abandoned were plans for an arena near the East Croydon station, after a compulsory purchase order was rejected in 2008 at Cabinet level.

On 22 November 2011, then Mayor of London Boris Johnson announced £23m of additional funding to help redevelop the town at the Develop Croydon Conference.

Several apartment developments, for instance Altitude 25 (completed 2010), have been built in recent years, and several more are being built or planned. The construction of Saffron Square, which includes a 43-storey tower, began on Wellesley Road in 2011 and was completed in 2016. Other developments with towers over 50 floors high have been given planning approval. These include the 54-storey "Menta Tower" in Cherry Orchard Road near East Croydon station, and a 55-storey tower at One Lansdowne Road, on which construction was set to begin in early 2013. The latter is set to be Britain's tallest block of flats, including office space, a four-star hotel and a health club.

In May 2012 it was announced that Croydon had been successful in its bid to become one of twelve "Portas Pilot" towns and would receive a share of £1.2m funding to help rejuvenate its central shopping areas.

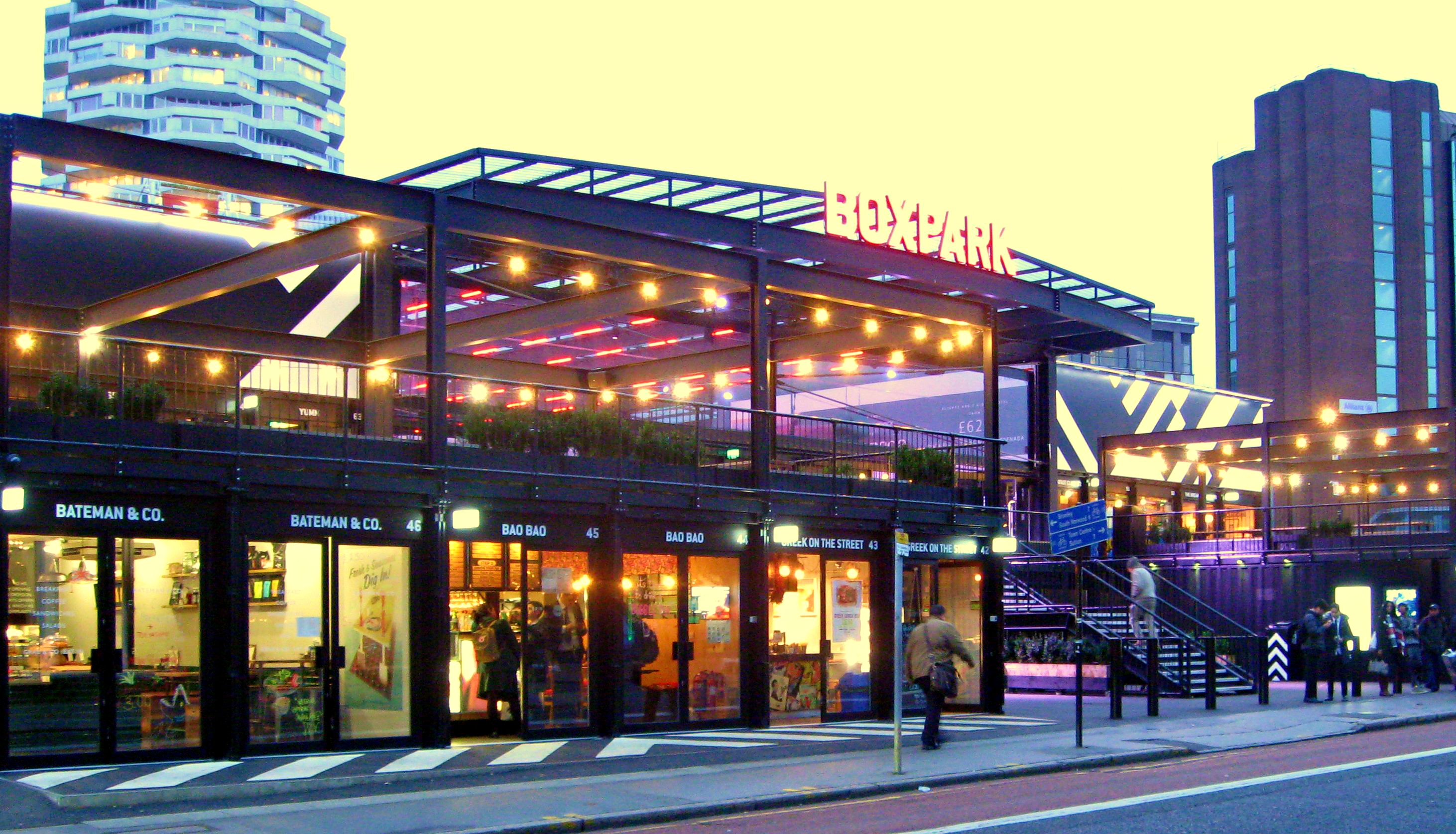
Boxpark, Croydon

In November 2013, Central Croydon MP Gavin Barwell gave a presentation at a public meeting on the Croydon regeneration project, detailing various developments underway due to be completed in coming years.

On 26 November 2013, Croydon Council approved a redevelopment of the Town Centre by The Croydon Partnership, a joint venture by the Westfield Group and Hammerson. London Mayor Boris Johnson approved the plan the following day. The Croydon Advertiser listed the approval as an "Historic Night for Croydon".

At Ruskin Square, a Boxpark made of sea containers opened in 2016 as a temporary measure until new buildings are constructed for shops, offices and housing. The London Evening Standard said that this and other developments were reviving the town which was in the process of gentrification.

=== Future ===
A Croydon Vision 2020 plan was drawn up by Croydon Council after a 1999 study by town planning consultants EDAW. The plan includes new office blocks, apartment buildings, shopping centres and other developments, some of which have already been built. More than 2,000 new homes are planned.

A redeveloped Fairfield Halls has been planned to be the linchpin of a cultural quarter encompassing nearby College Green. Plans include an art gallery, a new college, shops and offices, with a multi-storey car park set for demolition to make space for 218 homes.

== Economy ==
As of 2011, Croydon's annual retail turnover from comparison goods was £353 million, the fifth-highest in Greater London behind the West End, Shepherd's Bush, Stratford and Kingston upon Thames. Croydon had as of 2012 320,991 square metres (3,455,120 sq ft) of total town centre floorspace, the second highest in Greater London only behind the West End.

Apart from its large central shopping district, Croydon has a number of smaller shopping areas, especially towards the southern end of the town in which are many restaurants. As of 2011, two of Croydon's restaurants were listed in The Good Food Guide.

In a 2015 study by CACI, Croydon was ranked 12th in the "Hot 100 UK retail locations" with a score of 90%.

The Zotefoams company has its headquarters in Croydon.

== Government ==
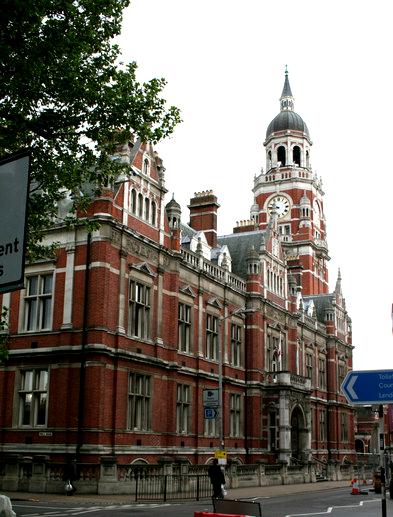
Croydon Town Hall, as seen from Katharine Street

=== Status ===
For centuries the area lay within the Wallington hundred, an ancient Anglo-Saxon administrative division of the county of Surrey. In the later Middle Ages – probably from the late 13th century onwards – residents of the town of Croydon, as defined by boundary markers known as the "four crosses", enjoyed a degree of self-government through a town court or portmote, and a form of free tenure of property. These privileges set the area of the town apart from its rural hinterland, where the more usual and more restrictive rules of manorial tenure applied. However, Croydon did not hold any kind of formal borough status.

In 1690, the leading inhabitants petitioned William III and Mary for Croydon to be incorporated as a borough. The application was initially approved, the king authorising the drafting of a charter, but the process was then abruptly halted, apparently through the intervention of Archbishop John Tillotson, who probably feared a threat to his own authority over the town. The application was revived the following year, when Queen Mary again authorised a charter, but once again it was abandoned. A second petition in 1707 was effectively ignored.

Croydon's growth in the 19th century brought the issue of incorporation back on to the political agenda, and in 1883 the ancient parish of Croydon, apart from its exclave of Croydon Crook or Selsdon, was created a municipal borough within Surrey. In 1889, because the population was high enough, it was made a county borough, exempt from county administration.

In 1965 (under the terms of the London Government Act 1963) the County Borough of Croydon was abolished and the area was transferred to Greater London and combined with the Coulsdon and Purley Urban District to form the London Borough of Croydon. The borough is responsible for local services including education, refuse collection, road maintenance, local planning and social care.

The borough has on several occasions sought city status. (This would be a purely honorific change of title, making no practical difference to the borough's governance). A draft petition was submitted by the County Borough to the Home Office in 1951, a more formal petition in 1954, and two more applications in 1955 and 1958. When the London Borough was created in 1965, the Council endeavoured to have it styled a City, as was the City of Westminster. Further bids for city status were made in 1977, 1992, 2000, 2002, and 2012. All have failed. The borough's predominant argument has always been its size: in 2000 it pointed out that it was "the largest town which does not have the title of City in the whole of Western Europe". The grounds on which it has been turned down have invariably been that it is (as was stated in 1992) merely "part of the London conurbation, rather than a place with a character and identity of its own". Undeterred, council representatives have more than once described Croydon as "a city in all but name". In 2008, Boris Johnson, then Mayor of London, said he would support Croydon being awarded city status.

=== Modern governance ===
Since 2022, Croydon Council has operated with a directly elected mayor and cabinet. The current executive mayor is Jason Perry, who was elected on 5 May 2022 and is a member of the Conservative Party. Perry was re-elected to the mayoralty in May 2026.

From 1974 to 2024, Croydon was represented by three Members of Parliament. Since the 2024 general election, reflecting the 2023 review of Westminster constituencies, Croydon has been covered by four parliamentary constituencies: Croydon East, Croydon West, Croydon South and, shared with a part of the Borough of Lambeth, Streatham and Croydon North. The sitting MPs are Natasha Irons for Croydon East, Sarah Jones for Croydon West, Steve Reed for Streatham and Croydon North, all Labour, and Croydon South Chris Philp, a Conservative.

== Public services ==
=== Police ===
The Metropolitan Police is the territorial police force responsible for Croydon. Croydon Police Station is located at 71 Park Lane, opposite the Croydon Flyover.

The prefix letters on the collar numbers of Police officer, Special Constables, PCSOs and other uniformed Police Staff in Croydon are "SN". They were previously "ZD" until the Metropolitan Police merged its borough command structure into 12 Basic Command Units in February 2018.

==== Windmill Road Custody Centre ====
In April 2012, a new purpose-built custody suite opened on Windmill Road. It replaced the custody suites that had operated at Croydon Police Station and the former South Norwood Police Station. In September 2012, the Windmill Road custody suite was named Berin Underwood House, after PC Berin Underwood, who was killed in a road traffic collision while travelling to work for a night shift in November 2002.

On 25 September 2020, Police Sergeant Matt Ratana (Matiu Ratana) was murdered by Louis de Zoysa inside one of the holding cells in the custody suite.

=== Fire and rescue ===
The statutory fire and rescue service in Croydon is the London Fire Brigade (LFB) who have a fire station in Old Town, with two pumping appliances.

=== Hospital and health services ===
The nearest hospital is Croydon University Hospital (known from 1923 to 2010 as Mayday Hospital) in nearby Thornton Heath, which is part of Croydon Health Services NHS Trust. The London Ambulance Service provides the ambulance service.

== Demography and population ==
The town of Croydon includes its neighbourhoods Addiscombe East, Addiscombe West, Bensham Manor, Broad Green, Coulsdon, Crystal Palace and Upper Norwood, Fairfield, Kenley, New Addington North, New Addington South, Norbury and Pollards Hill, Old Coulsdon, Park Hill and Whitgift, Purley and Woodcote, Sanderstead, Selhurst, Selsdon and Addington Village, Selsdon Vale and Forestdale, Shirley North, Shirley South, South Croydon, South Norwood, Thornton Heath, Waddon, West Thornton and Woodside.

Croydon is ethnically diverse. Those who are from BAME minority background range from 19.5% in Sanderstead ward to 68.6% in Broad Green. West Thornton ward (part of Thornton Heath) is one of the most ethnically diverse areas of England.

Fairfield ward, which is the major ward covering the central town, was ethnically 40% White British, 16% Indian, and 10% Other White in the 2011 UK Census. Religiously, 46% was Christian, 21% irreligious, 13% Hindu and 8% Muslim. The most common household tenure type was either owned or privately rented. The median age was 33. In addition, the Broad Green ward was ethnically 23% White British, 13% Indian, 13% Other Asian, and 11% Black African. About 41% of household tenures were owned, while privately and socially rented each made up 29% each. The median age was 31. The Addiscombe ward was ethnically 45% White British and 10% Other White. Religiously, 52% of the population was Christian, 24% irreligious, 7% Muslim and 6% Hindu. 52% of house tenures were owned. There are 10 other wards that cover Croydon's neighbourhoods.

The median house price as of 2014 was £212,998 in Selhurst ward, one of London's lowest. The highest in the town was in Sanderstead ward, £392,500. The mean age in 2013 ranged from 32 years in Broad Green and Fieldway wards, to 43.2 years in Selsdon and Ballards ward.

Changes of population over 110 years
Year of census	Population changes
1811	+1971
1821	+1687
1831	+2473
1841	+3641
1851	+2426
1861	+9263
1871	No Data
1881	+54,939 (Note: Population change from 1861 to 1881.)
1891	+25,971
1901	No Data
1911	+78,931 (Note: Population change from 1891 to 1911.)
1921	+25,059
1931	+52,084
1941	War (Note: No census was held due to World War II.)
1951	+34,734 (Note: Population change from 1931 to 1951.)
1961	+9,456
1971	+35,733
1981	−35,573
1991	+2,321
2001	+16,901
2011	+32,954

2011 Census homes %
Ward	Detached	Semi-detached	Terraced	Flats and apartments
Addiscombe	3.4%	13.6%	35.7%	47.2%
Ashburton	10.8%	36.8%	34.4%	18.0%
Broad Green	4.8%	18.1%	34.1%	42.9%
Croham	18.9%	15.8%	16.2%	49.1%
Fairfield	9.1%	7.0%	14.5%	69.4%
Fieldway	2.8%	25.7%	37.1%	34.4%
Heathfield	13.3%	30.8%	29.2%	26.8%
New Addington	2.6%	50.2%	21.8%	25.2%
Sanderstead	37.8%	44.7%	5.2%	12.2%
Selhurst	4.4%	16.3%	26.7%	52.7%
Selsdon and Ballards	24.4%	57.6%	11.7%	6.3%
Shirley	15.5%	42.3%	16.9%	25.3%
Waddon	5.9%	24.5%	23.5%	46.1%

Sales numbers and house prices in Croydon – March 2023
By property type	Number of sales last 12 months	Average price achieved in last 12 months	Average price change per unit area
Detached	161	£721,706	7.1%
Semi-detached	503	£512,064	5.9%
Terraced	789	£427,405	8.2%
Flats/apartments	898	£261,340	3.6%

== Geography ==
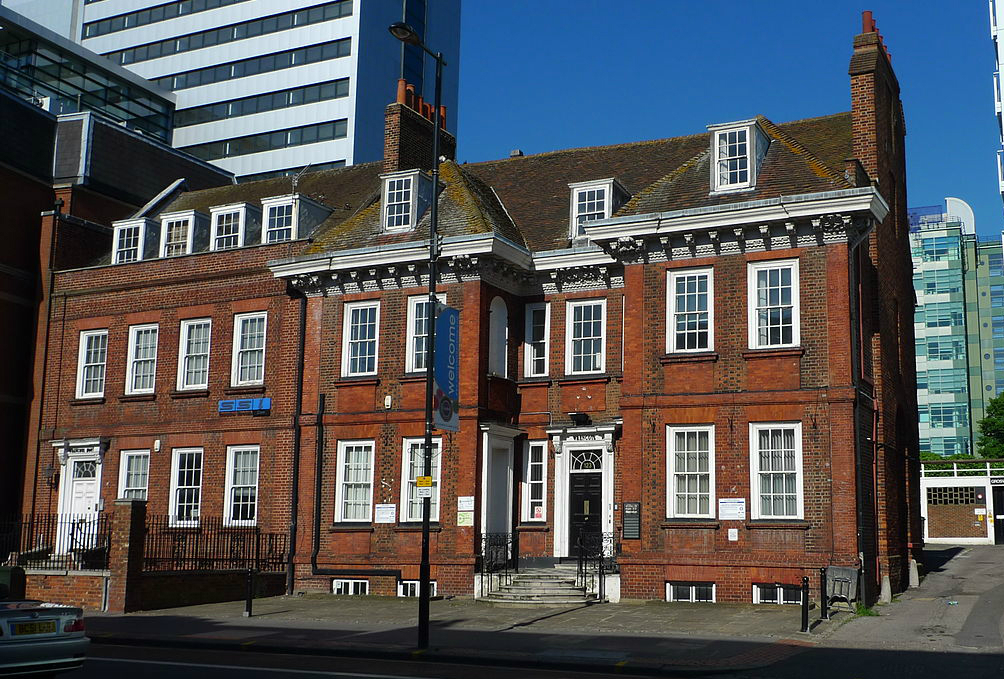
The Grade II listed Wrencote House, High Street, Croydon

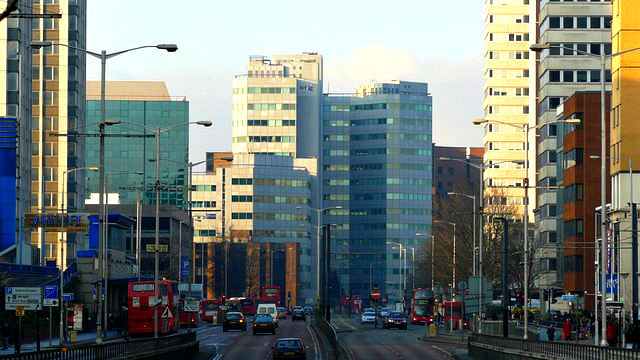
A view of Wellesley Road

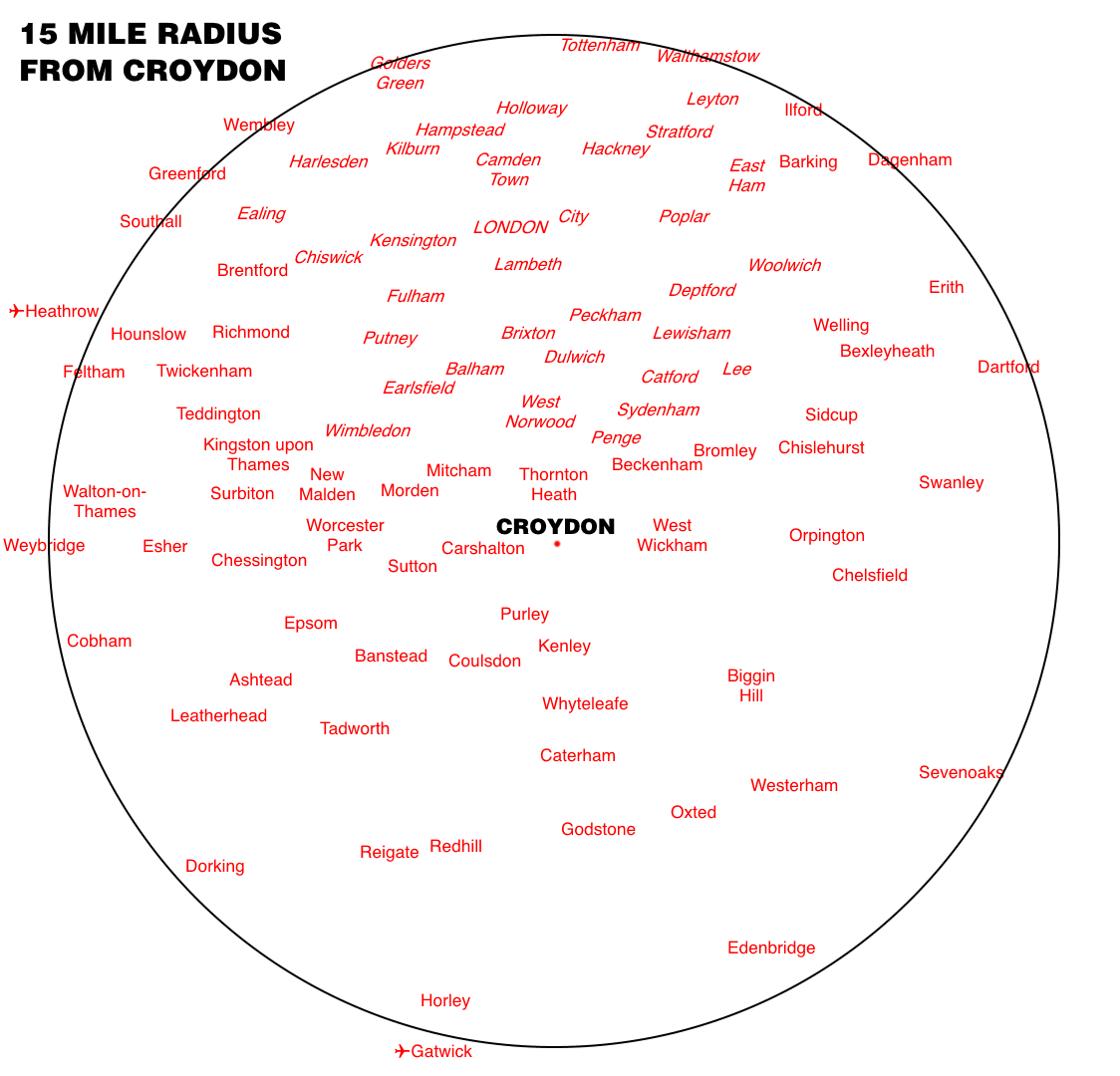
15 mile radius map from Croydon

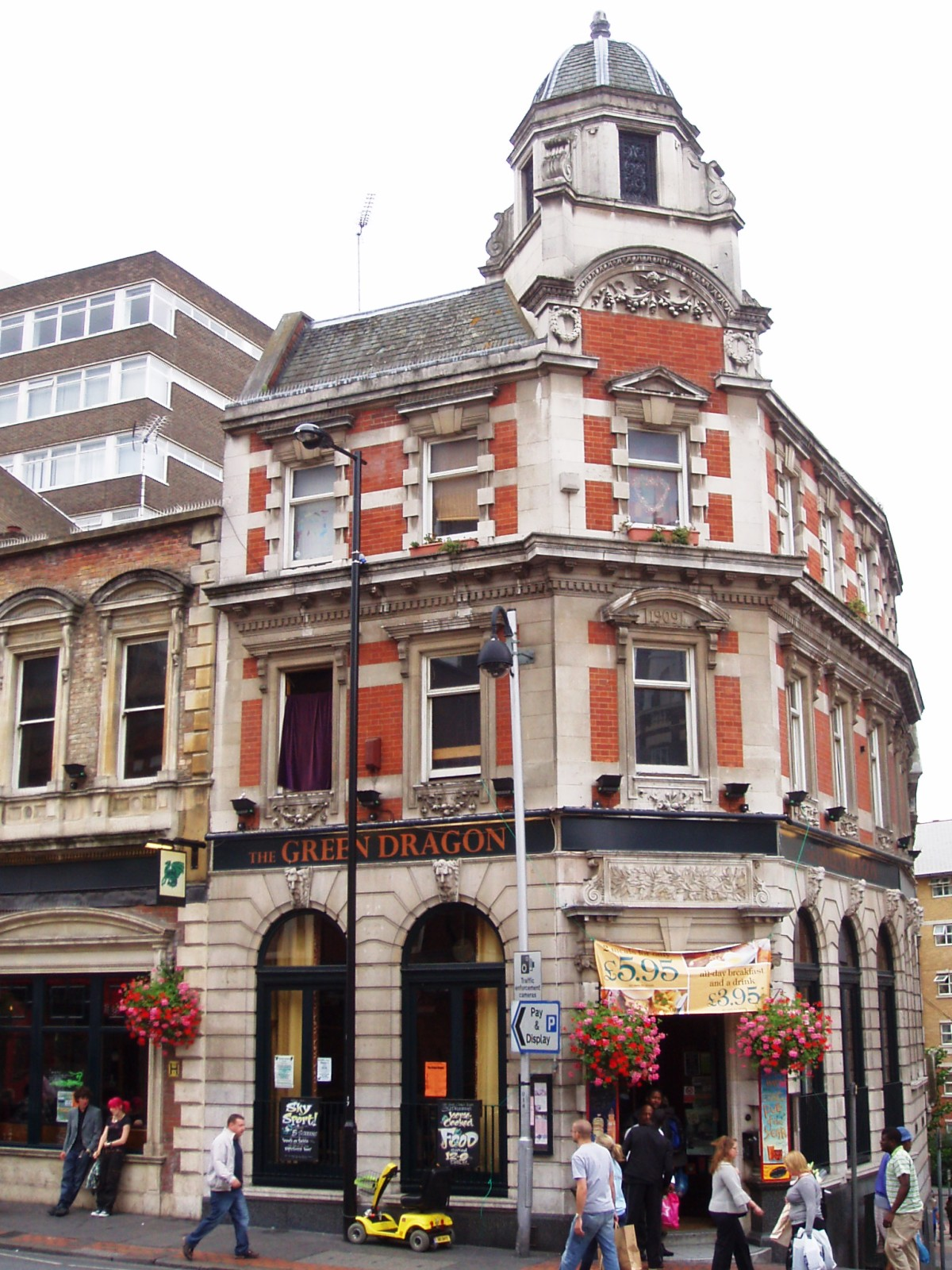
Victorian architecture in Croydon High Street

Croydon town centre is near the centre of the borough of Croydon, to the north of the North Downs and the Pilgrims' Way path. To the north of Croydon are typical London districts, whereas a short distance southeast (such as Coombe and Selsdon) is green, hilly and rural land. To the west are industrial areas, part of which are in the London Borough of Sutton. The southern suburbs are mainly affluent and also hilly.

The town centre is bordered by Waddon immediately southwest of central Croydon. To the west, inside the London Borough of Sutton lies Beddington. To the north are Broad Green, Thornton Heath and Selhurst. To the south lies South Croydon, and going further south are Purley and Sanderstead. To the east lie Addiscombe and Shirley.

Croydon High Street runs from South Croydon up to the point where it meets the street called North End. North End is the main shopping street, while Croydon High Street is the main restaurant quarter.

The High Street is also home to Wrencote House, a Grade II* listed building. Dating from the late 17th or early 18th centuries, and probably built as a merchant's house, it has a distinctive "H" plan form over its four floors (including basement and attic storey). External features include a rich red brick facade with black headers, and a heavily carved and enriched wooden eaves cornice.

Wellesley Road on the A212 road forms a north–south axis through the town centre. In line with London Plan policy, there have been a number of proposals to create greater integration between East Croydon station, which lies on one side of the A212, and the town centre of Croydon, which lies on the other side of it. Croydon Vision 2020 aims to tackle this though such solutions as making the road easier for pedestrians to cross by creating a centre island pathway.

Topographically, central Croydon generally lies between 50 metres (160 ft) (in the north) and 70 metres (230 ft) (in the south) above sea level. Elevation significantly climbs towards the east of the town – Coombe Park peaks at about 95 metres (312 ft) above sea level, whereas the Addington Hills, Coombe Wood and Addington Golf Course are as high as 145 metres (476 ft), with the southern end of New Addington having an elevation of over 160 metres (520 ft). To the south, Croham Hurst has a hill of 145 metres (476 ft), and the highest area of Croydon is the Sanderstead Plantation at 175 metres (574 ft). The lowest elevation is around Broad Green, about 35 metres (115 ft) above sea level.

=== River Wandle ===
The River Wandle is a tributary of the River Thames, flowing some 9 miles (14 km) to Wandsworth and Putney from its source in Croydon. It roughly forms the borough's western boundary with the London Borough of Sutton, and for part of its length also forms the boundary between the London Boroughs of Croydon and Lambeth. One of its tributaries rises in Selhurst.

== Culture ==
=== Arts ===
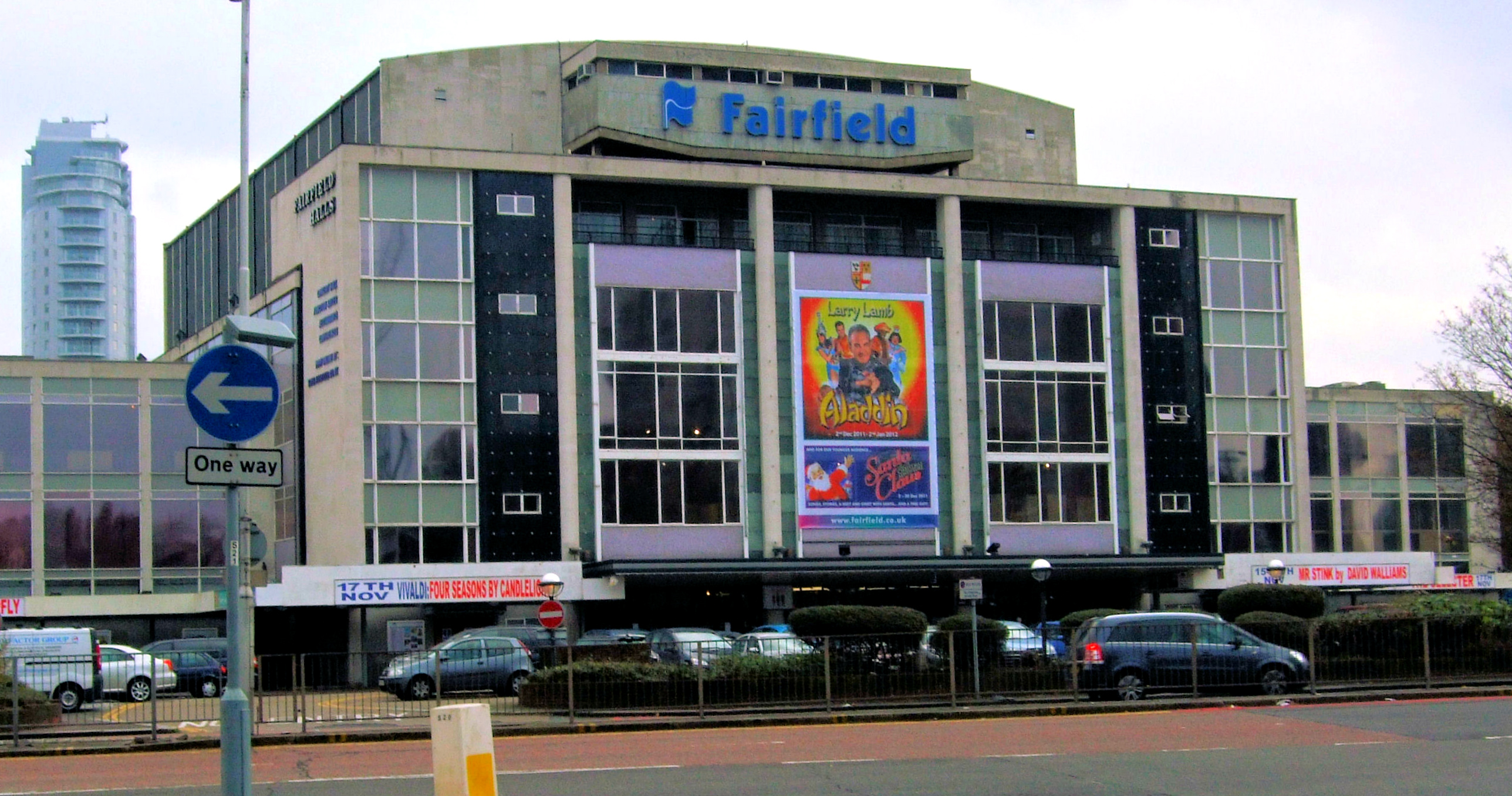
The Fairfield Halls, Croydon's entertainment complex

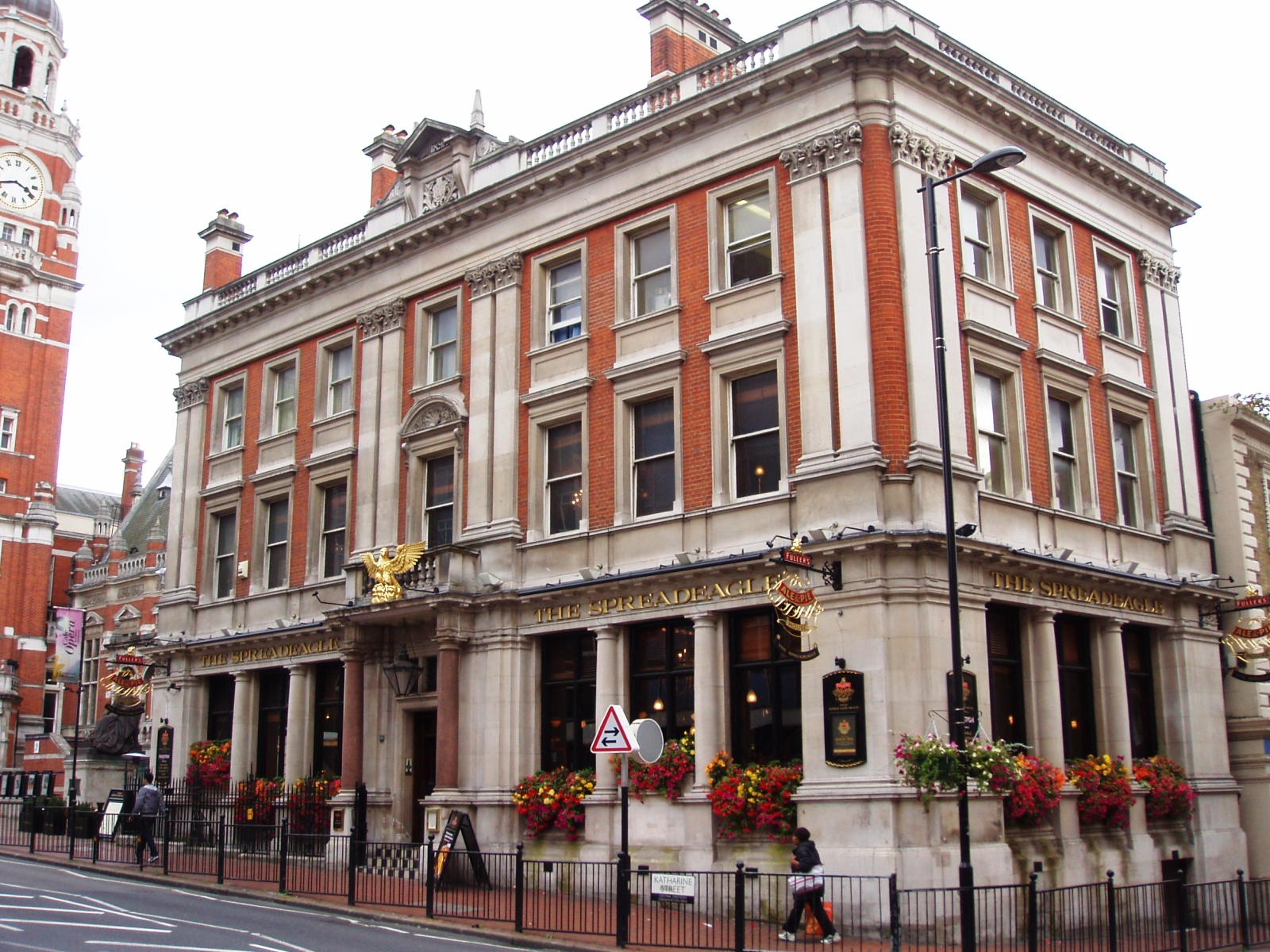
The Spreadeagle, central Croydon, which also houses the theatre of the same name that opened in 2013

There are several arts venues. Foremost is the Fairfield Halls, opened in 1962, which consists of a large concert hall frequently used for BBC recordings, the Ashcroft Theatre and the Arnhem Gallery. Fairfield is the home of the London Mozart Players. Many famous faces have appeared at the Fairfield Halls, including the Beatles, Bucks Fizz, Omid Djalili, Robert Cray, JLS, Chuck Berry, B. B. King, Don McLean, The Monkees, Johnny Cash, Dionne Warwick, Gladys Knight, Morecambe and Wise, Tom Jones, The Stylistics, Status Quo, Level 42, A-HA, John Mayall, Jools Holland, Kenny Rogers, James Last, and Coolio. The main concert hall was used for the conference scene in the Ron Howard film The Da Vinci Code (2006). The Fairfield Halls reopened in 2019, following a programme of modernisation and refurbishment. Prior to the construction of The Fairfield Halls theatre entertainment was provided by the Theatre Royal (1868–1959) based on the high street on a site previously housing a venue known as 'the theatre'.

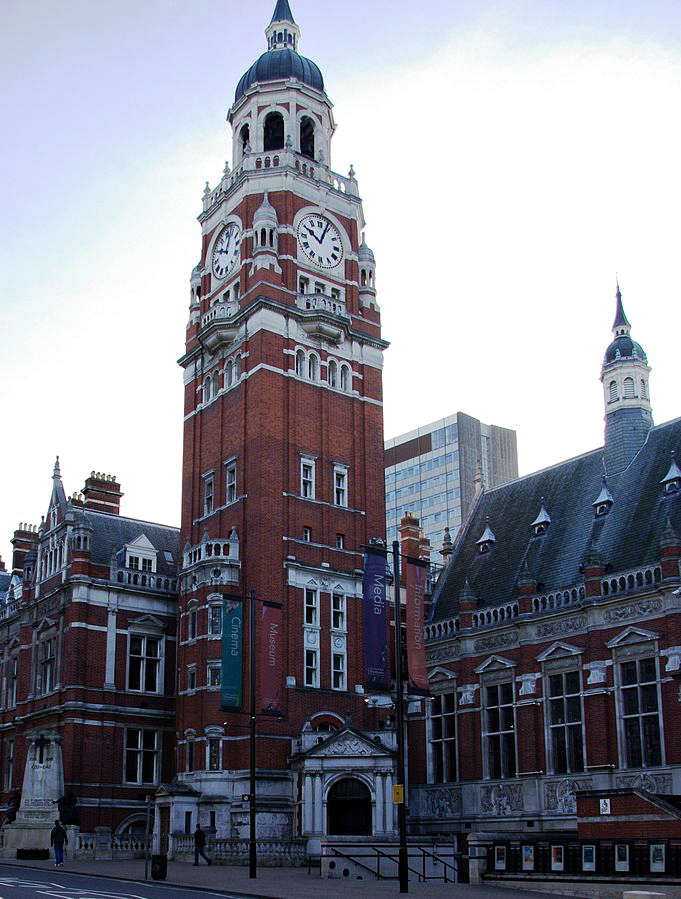
Croydon Clocktower Arts Centre

Croydon Clocktower, developed by the London Borough of Croydon in the mid-1990s, houses a state-of-the-art library, a performance venue in the old reference library, the David Lean Cinema (a small, independent, art-house cinema) and the Museum of Croydon, which details Croydon's history. The building links into Croydon Town Hall and some areas of the building, most notably the Braithwaite Hall, are part of the original town hall and library complex, built in 1892–1896 to a design by Charles Henman. A bronze statue of Queen Victoria was erected outside the buildings in 1903.

The Warehouse Theatre (which closed in 2012), was a studio theatre known for promoting new writing, comedy and youth theatre. It had to close because of the major Ruskin Square redevelopment, but will re-open in the future in a new larger theatre building within the new development.

The Pembroke Theatre had many productions with well-known actors before its closure in about 1962.

There are several local and small venues for comedy and community events dotted around Croydon and its districts. Croydon Youth Theatre Organisation celebrated its 40th birthday in 2005. There are several community arts groups, particularly in the large Asian community.

The Spread Eagle Theatre is a new 50-seat studio theatre. Opened in October 2013, it is situated in the town centre, 10 minutes' walk from East Croydon Station. The Spread Eagle works closely with its sister venue, the Old Joint Stock Theatre in Birmingham. Both venues champion 'big plays for small spaces' with an emphasis on new writing, supporting emerging artists and theatre companies.

A calendar titled "Rare Roundabouts of Croydon", with a picture of a different Croydon roundabout each month, has enjoyed some success.

=== Public art ===
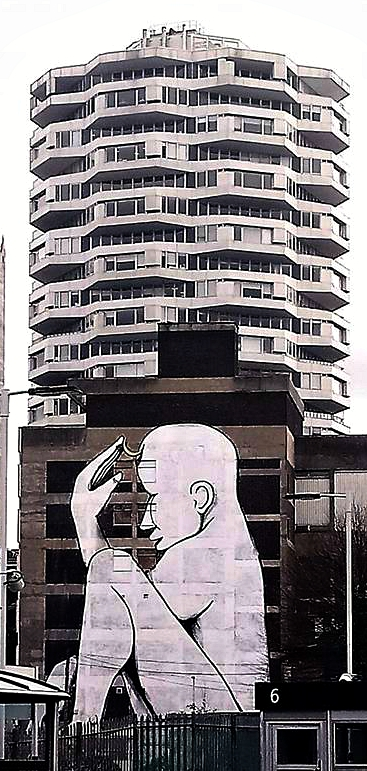
One of several new murals to have appeared in Croydon town centre in recent years

About 60 murals were added to Croydon town centre in 2018, as part of the Rise street art festival coordinated by the Rise art gallery in Croydon.

=== Literature ===
Croydon is the setting of two poems by British Poet Laureate Sir John Betjeman, "Croydon" and "Love in a Valley".

The borough has been the residence of many renowned authors and novelists, including Sir Arthur Conan Doyle, who set up house in Norwood, D.H. Lawrence, and French novelist Émile Zola, who lived for a time in the Queen's Hotel, Upper Norwood. Cicely Mary Barker, author and illustrator of the Flower Fairies series of books, was born in Croydon.

Croydon is the setting of various novels. The now defunct airport lent itself to the mysteries The 12.30 from Croydon and Death in the Clouds, and the town is mentioned in some Sherlock Holmes mysteries.

Croydon is referred to in a rhyme dating back to the 18th century, revised in the Victorian era to:

Sutton for good mutton;
Cheam for juicy beef;
Croydon for a pretty girl
And Mitcham for a thief.

In Jane Austen's unfinished novel The Watsons (written c.1803–1805), the heroine, Emma Watson, has a brother and sister-in-law who live in Croydon, and who urge her to join them for an extended visit. Another sister, Elizabeth, encourages the idea, commenting "there is always something lively going on at Croydon". It would appear that the plot was intended to continue with Emma moving to Croydon.

=== Music ===
The composer Samuel Coleridge-Taylor (1875–1912) lived at 30 Dagnall Park, Selhurst, until his death. He grew up in Croydon and sang in the church choir at St George's and taught at the Crystal Palace School of Music and many other schools of music. He died from pneumonia after collapsing at West Croydon station. There is an impressive grave with a poem at Bandon Hill Cemetery, and exhibits about him in the Museum of Croydon.

Addington Palace housed The Royal School of Church Music from 1953 to 1996, when it moved to Salisbury.

In addition to the Fairfield Halls, several venues in Croydon have hosted rock acts. Established in 1976, the Cartoon was a popular live music venue that closed in 2006. The Greyhound in Park Lane played host to acts such as Led Zeppelin, Jimi Hendrix, The Who, David Bowie, Queen, Siouxsie and the Banshees, The Damned, The Boomtown Rats, A-ha in (1987) and others during the 1960s and '70s. Mott The Hoople paid tribute to the town's music scene in the song Saturday Gigs. The Greyhound also saw the debut of the Electric Light Orchestra in 1972.

In the punk era Croydon had its own scene including bands such as Johnny Moped, which at one point had member Captain Sensible who later released the song "Croydon" in 1982 in tribute to his home town.

Croydon has been at the centre of the development of the dubstep genre, a relatively recent musical development that traces its roots from Jamaican dub music, UK Garage and drum and bass. Artists such as Benga and Skream, who honed their production and DJing skills whilst working at the now defunct Big Apple Records on Surrey Street, along with Norwood's Digital Mystikz, DJ Chef, and Thornton Heath's Plastician, form the core roster of dubstep DJs and producers. Moreover, UK rappers and grime artists Stormzy, Krept and Konan, all hail from or can trace their roots to the London Borough of Croydon.

In 1993, Music Week reported that Croydon's record shops were thriving. The town centre was for 30 years home to Europe's largest second-hand record store, Beano's, offering rare vinyl, CDs and books. In November 2008, it was announced that Beano's would close. The premises, off Church Street near the Grant's cinema complex, became a "market place" with stalls for rent by small business and individuals.

Continuing Croydon's tradition of dubstep record shops, are Reggaemasters, which opened in 2004 on Drummond Road and moved to Frith Road in 2019, and Addiscombe's DnR Vinyl, which cites Big Apple Records as its main inspiration. Ten Pin Records opened in Purley in 2022.

The oldest currently surviving shop in Croydon is 46 South End, which is a music shop. Dating back to the 16th century, this Grade II listed building still retains all its original Tudor features. Records show that the premises has been a shop for at least 163 years, where street directories from 1851 give the names of E. C. Johnson & Thorpe.

Croydon is home to the BRIT School for performing arts and technology, based in Selhurst, which has produced stars such as Adele, Jessie J, Amy Winehouse, Leona Lewis, Katie Melua, Katy B, Kate Nash, Imogen Heap, Rizzle Kicks, Dane Bowers and members of the Feeling & the Kooks. Independent of such institutions, Croydon is also the home of artists such as Nosferatu D2, Frankmusik, Noisettes, and Saint Etienne.

Club Soda is a music charity supporting artists with learning disabilities, their artists include The Carbonators. They run a regular club night called Soda Beat.

=== Media ===
Zodiac Court in West Croydon, the filming location of the series Peep Show

The ITV police drama The Bill, although set in East London, was filmed in Croydon and many of the town centre locations were filmed around Surrey Street and St George's House (the Nestle building). Sun Hill Police Station is in nearby Mitcham. The opening credit sequence for the sitcom Terry and June featured the eponymous stars walking around the Whitgift Centre and the Fairfield Halls. In 2007, the music video for pop star Mika's single "Big Girl (You Are Beautiful)" was shot in various locations around the town, including High Street and Surrey Street Market. The Delta Point building, close to West Croydon station appeared in the film The Dark Knight Rises as Gotham General Hospital. Croydon was the setting and frequent filming location for the Channel 4 sitcom Peep Show (2003–2015). The 2018 interactive film, Black Mirror: Bandersnatch featured several scenes shot in Croydon, such as St George's Walk and No.1 Croydon.

Croydon has its own fully independent television station: it does not receive any government or local authority grant or funding and is supported by donations, sponsorship and by commercial advertising. In 2012, Croydon Radio, an internet radio station, began in the area.

== Sport and leisure ==
=== Parks and open spaces ===
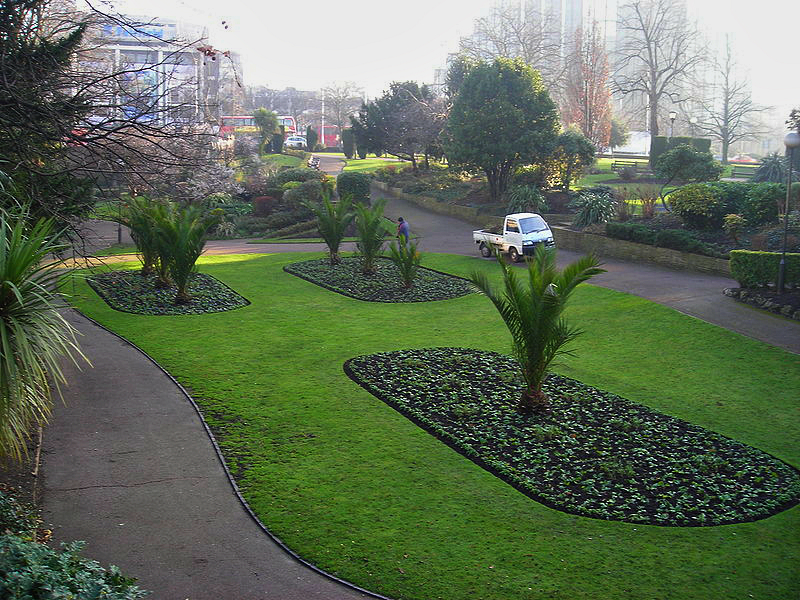
A photo of Queens Gardens (taken December 2007) in the town centre

The borough has many woods for walking in, which together account for 8.5% of Greater London's woodland resource (626.46 hectares). These include Lloyd Park and Croham Hurst.

Among several other parks and open spaces around Croydon, there is an area (2 1/4 acres 0.91 hectares) of landscaped green space in the town centre called Queens Gardens; it is adjacent to the town hall and Clocktower art centre.

Croydon holds one of the sources of the River Wandle. The river being a rare chalk stream. The Wandle Trail enables walkers to walk main off-road to London. The Vanguard Way is an off-road walk from Croydon to Newhaven (Britain's South Coast) intersecting the London Outer Orbital Path, North Downs Way and the Pilgrims' Way.

=== Clubs and teams ===
The most prominent sports club in the borough is Crystal Palace Football Club, based in the north of the borough since 1918. Palace play at the purpose-built stadium of Selhurst Park, which the club moved to in 1924 from the Nest, its first Croydon-based stadium. The Nest had previously been the home of the defunct Croydon Common Football Club and sat next to Selhurst station. Palace won promotion to the Premier League (the top tier of football in England) at the end of the 2012–13 season. Croydon has a Non-League football club, Croydon F.C. who play at Croydon Sports Arena. Sunday League team Purley Saint Germain also play at Croydon Sports Arena.

Streatham-Croydon RFC, founded in 1871, is one of Greater London's oldest extant rugby union clubs, playing just north of the town centre at Frant Road in Thornton Heath.

There are a number of field hockey clubs based in and around Croydon that are part of the South East Hockey and the London Hockey league structures. Current hockey clubs in and around the area are Addiscombe, Croydon Trinity Whitgiftian, Kenley, Purley, Purley Walcountians and Sanderstead.

Croydon Amphibians SC plays in Division 2 British Waterpolo League. In 2008, the team won the National League Division 3.

The borough previously had a women's roller derby team called Croydon Roller Derby, which trained in Carshalton. The team was established in the early part of this decade and played both national and international teams including Roller Derby Madrid, Stuttgart Valley Rollergirlz and Oxford Roller Derby. The sport is full-contact and played on quad skates with players skating round an elliptical track. In April 2019, Croydon Roller Derby announced on their Facebook page that it had taken the decision to disband.

== Transport ==
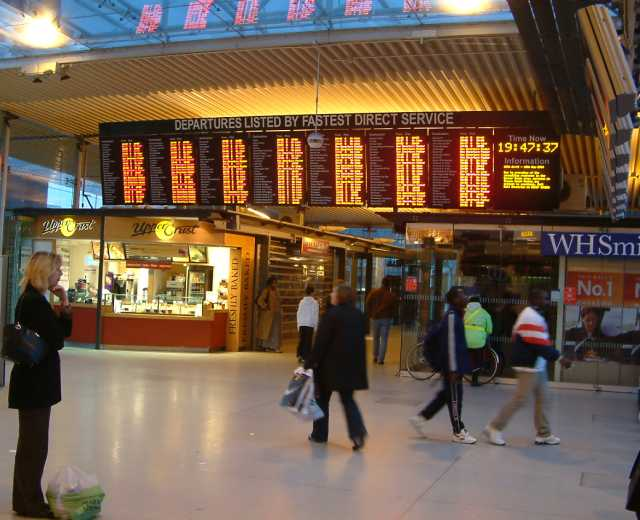
The concourse of East Croydon station

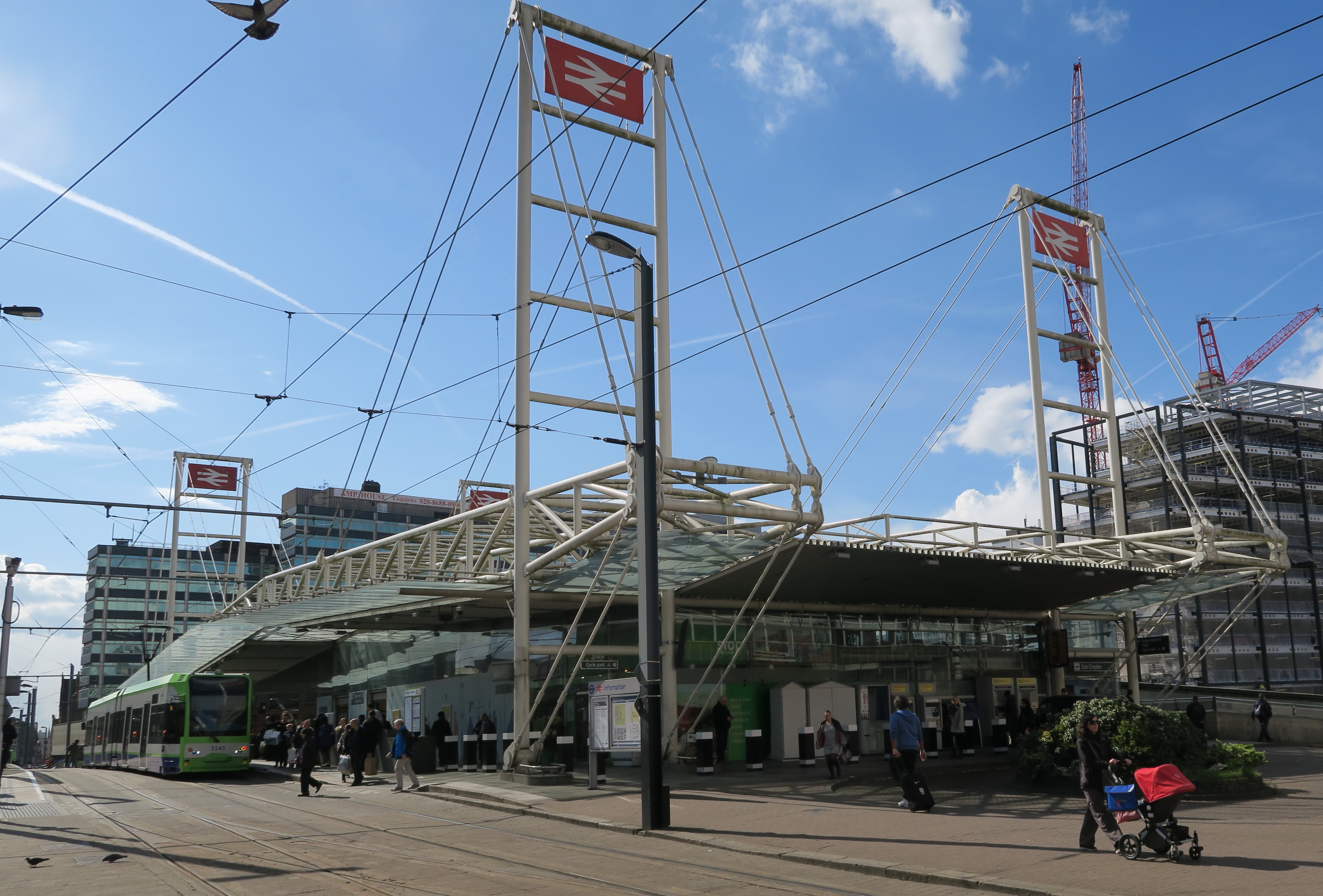
East Croydon mainline station

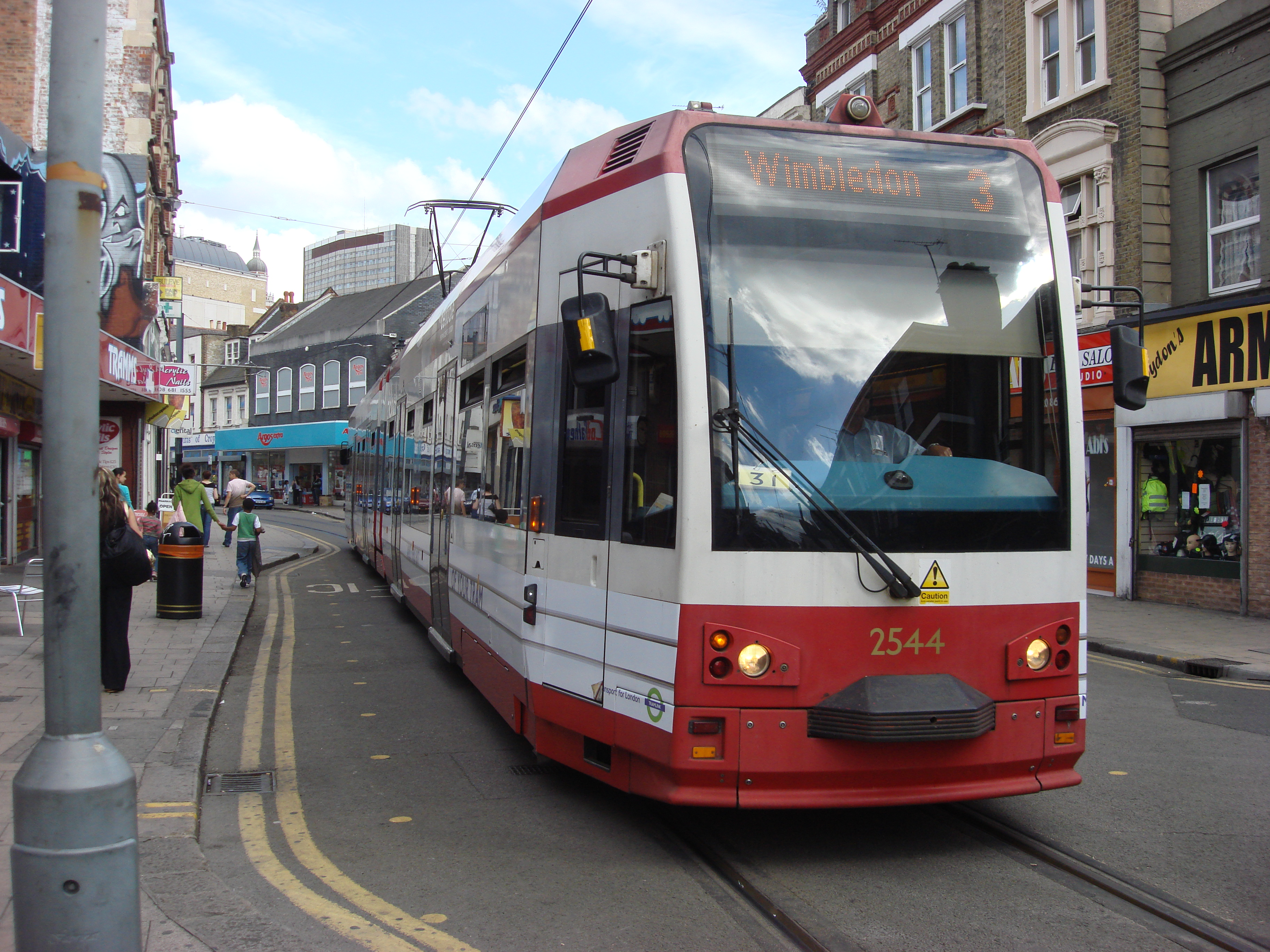
Tram no. 2544 in Church Street, 2008

=== Rail ===
==== Heavy rail ====
Croydon is served by East Croydon, South Croydon and West Croydon railway stations. East Croydon and South Croydon are served by Govia Thameslink Railway, operating under the Southern and Thameslink brands via the Brighton Main Line. West Croydon is served by London Overground's Windrush line, as its most southern terminus and Southern services. The largest and busiest of the three stations is East Croydon, although West Croydon is located closer to Croydon's main shopping district.

==== Light rail ====
The Tramlink tram system opened in 2000; Croydon is its hub. Its network consists of two main lines, from Elmers End or Beckenham to Wimbledon, and from New Addington to West Croydon, with all trams running via a loop in central Croydon. It is the only tram system in Greater London. It serves Mitcham, Woodside, Addiscombe and the Purley Way retail and industrial area.

The system was previously known as the "Croydon Tramlink", having been established under the Croydon Tramlink Act 1994.

=== Road ===
A few miles to the south of Croydon is a small gap in the North Downs, a route for transport from London to the south coast. The London to Brighton road used to pass through the town on North End before the A23 Purley Way was built to the west. Transport for London operates many bus routes in and around Croydon. Most buses serve West Croydon bus station, next to the railway station and tram stop.

=== Croydon's early transport links ===
The horse-drawn Surrey Iron Railway was an early public railway. It was opened in 1803, had double track, was some 8.5 miles (13.7 km) long and ran from Wandsworth to Croydon, at what is now Reeves Corner. In 1805 it was extended to Merstham as the Croydon, Merstham, and Godstone Railway. The railway boom of the 1840s brought superior and faster steam lines and it closed in 1846. The route is followed in part by the modern Tramlink. The last remaining sections of rail can be seen behind railings in a corner of Rotary Field in Purley.

With the opening of the London, Brighton and South Coast Railway line to London Victoria in 1860 extra platforms were provided at East Croydon, which the LBSCR treated as a separate station named New Croydon. The South Eastern Railway (SER) was excluded from this station, which ran exclusively LBSCR services to London at fares cheaper than those the SER offered from the original station. In 1864, the LBSCR obtained authorisation to construct a 1/2-mile long branch line into the heart of the town centre near Katharine Street, where Croydon Central station was built. The line opened in 1868 but enjoyed little success and closed in 1871, only to reopen in 1886 under pressure from the Town Council before finally closing in 1890. The station was subsequently demolished and replaced by the Town Hall. In 1897–98, East Croydon and New Croydon were merged into a single station with three island platforms, which remain today, but the two stations kept separate booking accounts until 1924.

The Croydon Canal ran for 9.5 miles (15.3 km) from what is now West Croydon station. It travelled north largely along the course of the present railway line to New Cross Gate, where it joined the Grand Surrey Canal and went on into the River Thames. It opened in 1809 and had 28 locks. It had a strong competitor in the Surrey Iron Railway and was never a financial success. It sold out to the London & Croydon Railway in 1836. The lake at South Norwood is the former reservoir for the canal.

Croydon Airport on Purley Way was the main airport for London until it was superseded by Heathrow Airport and Gatwick Airport. It opened on 29 March 1920 by combining two smaller airfields used for defence in World War I. It developed into one of the great airports of the world during the 1920s and 1930s. It welcomed the world's pioneer aviators in its heyday. As aviation technology progressed and aircraft became larger and more numerous, it was recognised in 1952 that the airport would be too small to cope with increasing air traffic and its role was decreased.. The last scheduled flight departed on 30 September 1959. The air terminal, now known as Airport House adjoining Purley Way to the west of the town, has been restored and has a museum open one day a month. The name "Croydon Airport" is still used as a landmark and as a bus stop designation.

RAF Kenley was another significant airfield during the war years, and now is used for gliding.

== Notable people ==
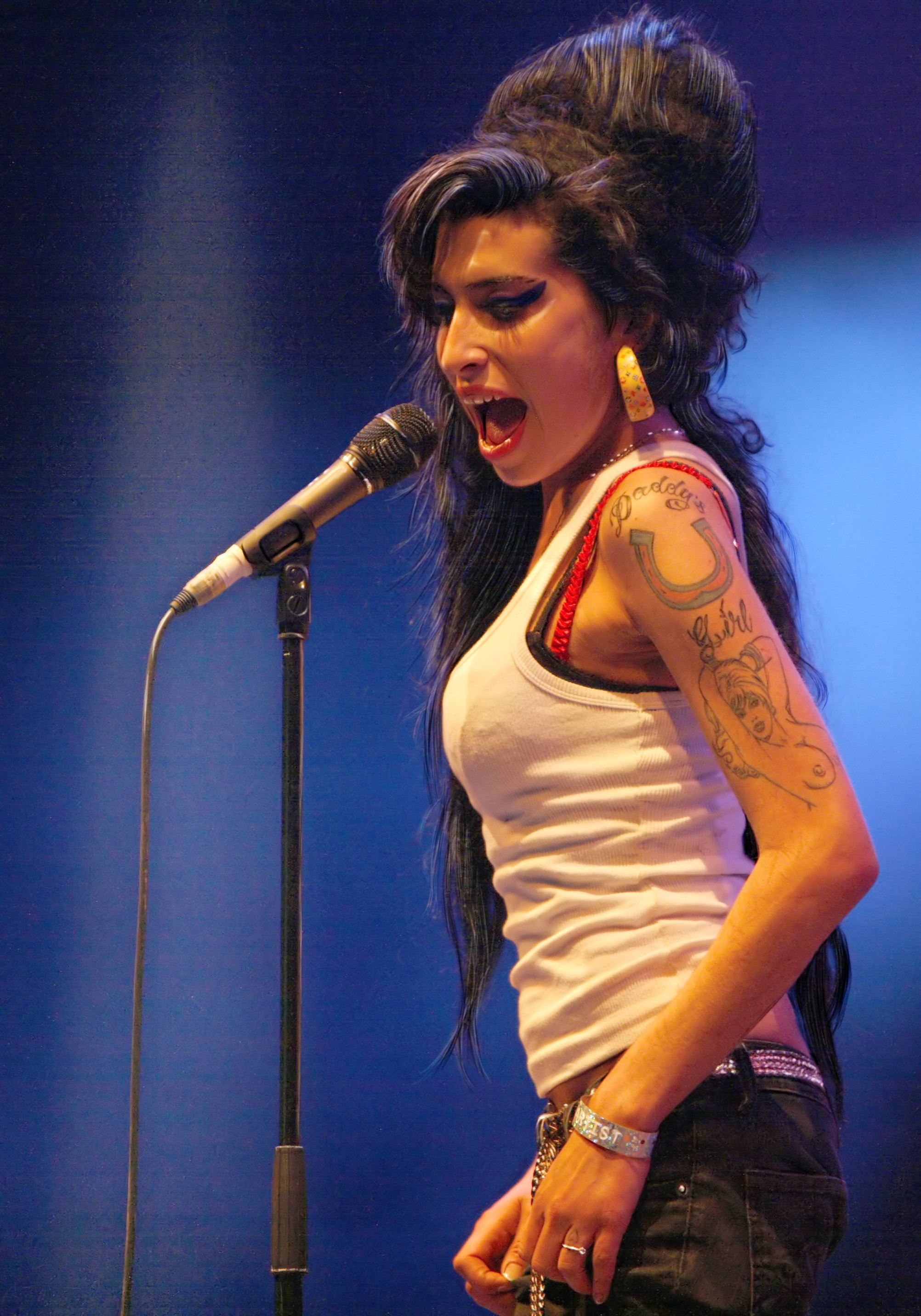
Amy Winehouse attended the BRIT School, Croydon

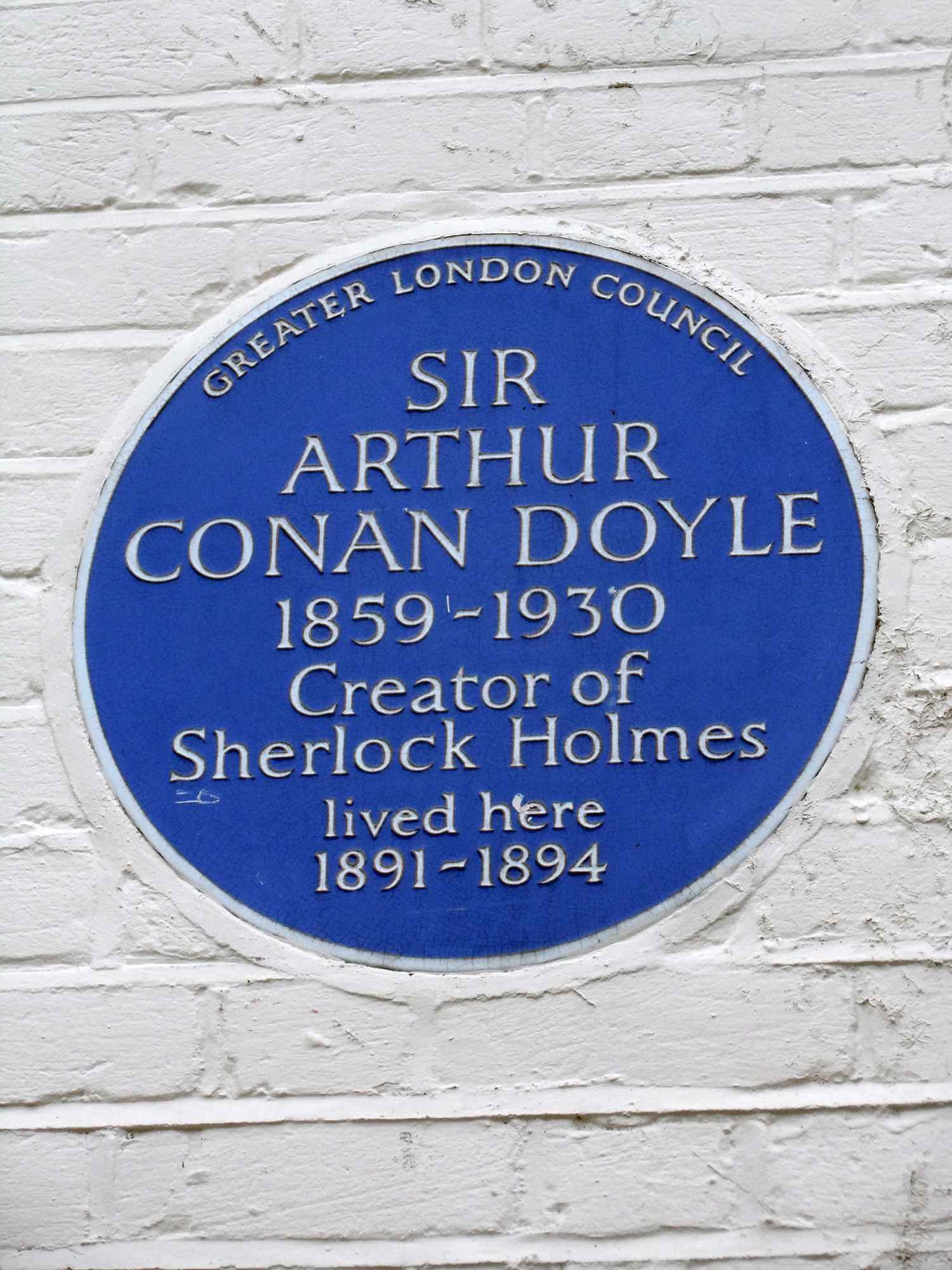
Memorial of Sir Arthur Conan Doyle in No. 12 Tennison Road, his house from 1891–1894.

- Peggy Ashcroft (1907–1991), actress, was born in Croydon, lived in George Street as a child and attended Croydon High School; honoured in the name of the Ashcroft Theatre, part of the Fairfield Halls
- Lionel Atwill (1885–1946), stage and screen actor, was born in Croydon
- Robert Barclay (1833–1876), an English Quaker historiographer
- Jon Benjamin (1964–), Chief Executive of the Board of Deputies of British Jews, born and grew up in Croydon
- Alex Brooker (1984–), Journalist, born in Croydon
- Raymond Chandler (1888–1959), American detective fiction writer, lived in Upper Norwood as a schoolboy
- Anne Clark (1960–), electronic music artist and poet, was born in Croydon
- Carlton Cole (1983–), English footballer, born in Croydon
- Ronnie Corbett [1930-2016}, Comedian and tv personality, lived in Croydon
- Kit Connor (2004–), Actor known for Rocketman and Heartstopper on Netflix, born and raised in Croydon
- Roger Ward Crosskey (1930–2017), entomologist, born in Croydon
- Sir Arthur Conan Doyle (1859–1930), Scottish-born fiction writer, lived at No. 12 Tennison Road, South Norwood and featured the area in some of his Sherlock Holmes detective stories
- Jane Drew (1911–1996), modernist architect, born in Thornton Heath and head girl at Croydon High School
- Havelock Ellis (1859–1939), sexologist, born in Croydon
- Russell Floyd (1962–), actor & director
- Paul Garelli (1924–2006), French Assyriologist, born in Croydon
- Philip Green (1952–), businessman and owner of the Arcadia Group, born in Croydon
- Ben Haenow (1985–), pop singer, winner of The X Factor (UK series 11), born in Croydon
- Andrew Haigh (1973–), filmmaker, grew up in Croydon
- Roy Hodgson (1947–), Crystal Palace and former England manager, born and grew up in Croydon
- Tom Holland (1996–), actor in five Marvel Cinematic Universe films, educated at the BRIT School
- William Forster Lanchester, (1875–1953), zoologist, born and raised in Croydon
- Eden Kane (born Richard Graham Sarstedt) (1940–), singer and older brother of Peter and Robin Sarstedt
- Rachel Khoo (1980–), cook, editor-in-chief of online lifestyle magazine Khoollect, with her own BBC series
- George Knowland (1922–1945), Victoria Cross recipient, went to Elmwood Junior School
- Nish Kumar (1985–), comedian, born in Wandsworth and raised in Croydon
- D. H. Lawrence (1885–1930), novelist, lived at 12 Colworth Road, Addiscombe, 1908–1912 whilst a teacher at Davidson Road School
- David Lean (1908–1991), film director, born in Croydon
- Mike Leeder (1968–), Hong Kong based Casting Director and Film Producer, born and raised in Croydon. Worked at Allders of Croydon, before relocating to Hong Kong in 1989.
- Miles Malleson (1888–1969), actor, playwright. (Born in Avondale Road)
- Kirsty MacColl (1959–2000), singer and songwriter, born and grew up in Selsdon, Croydon
- Pat Marsh (1934–2017), secretary of the British Ice Hockey Association, lived in Croydon
- David McAlmont (1967–), singer, songwriter, writer, historian; born at St Mary's Maternity Hospital, attended Broadmead Primary
- Ralph McTell (1944–), musician, composer of "Streets of London", was brought up in Croydon
- Katie Melua (1984–), musician, singer and songwriter, attended the BRIT School
- Kate Moss (1974–), model, attended Riddlesdown High School
- Malcolm Muggeridge (1903–1990), author and media personality, the son of H. T. Muggeridge, a prominent Croydon Labour councillor, and taught at John Ruskin Central School in the 1920s
- Sue Perkins (1969–), broadcaster, comedian. Raised in Croydon.
- Lucy Porter (1973–), comedian, born in Croydon
- Jason Puncheon (1986–), professional footballer playing in midfield for Pafos FC (Cyprus)
- Susanna Reid (1970–), TV journalist and presenter, raised and educated in Croydon
- Flora Sandes (1876–1956) British WW1 Sergeant Serbian Army lived in Thornton Heath
- Peter Sarstedt (1941–2017), singer, winner of Ivor Novello Award, lived in Croydon as a teenager
- Robin Sarstedt (1944–2022), singer and younger brother of Peter
- Hannah Schmitz (1985–), Principal Strategy Engineer at Red Bull Racing, attended Croydon High School
- Captain Sensible (born Raymond Burns) (1954–), guitarist with The Damned, attended school in South Norwood
- Ashraf Sinclair (1979–2020), Malaysian actor, born in Croydon
- Emile Smith Rowe (2000–), professional football player, born in Thornton Heath before relocating to North London
- Dan Stevens (1982–), actor, born in Croydon
- Stormzy (1993–) UK grime rapper, born in Croydon
- Aaron Wan-Bissaka (1997–), English footballer, born in Croydon
- Alfred Russel Wallace (1823–1913) naturalist, scientist lived in Croydon for three years
- Algy Ward (born Alaisdair Terry Mackie Ward) (1959–2023), bass guitarist and musician with The Saints, The Damned, and Tank, born in Croydon
- Amy Winehouse (1983–2011), singer, attended the BRIT School
- Edward Woodward (1930–2009), actor, born and for many years lived in Croydon
- Wilfried Zaha (1992–), professional football player, grew up in Thornton Heath and attended Selsdon High School

== Education ==
The town is home to Croydon College, with its main site on Park Lane and College Road near East Croydon station. It has over 13,000 students attending one of its three sub-colleges. The sub-colleges were created in 2007. The three sub-colleges are the Croydon Sixth Form College, Croydon Skills and Enterprise College and the Croydon Higher Education College. The Higher Education College offers university-level education in a range of subjects from Law through to Fine Art. Croydon Skills and Enterprise College delivers training and education opportunities.

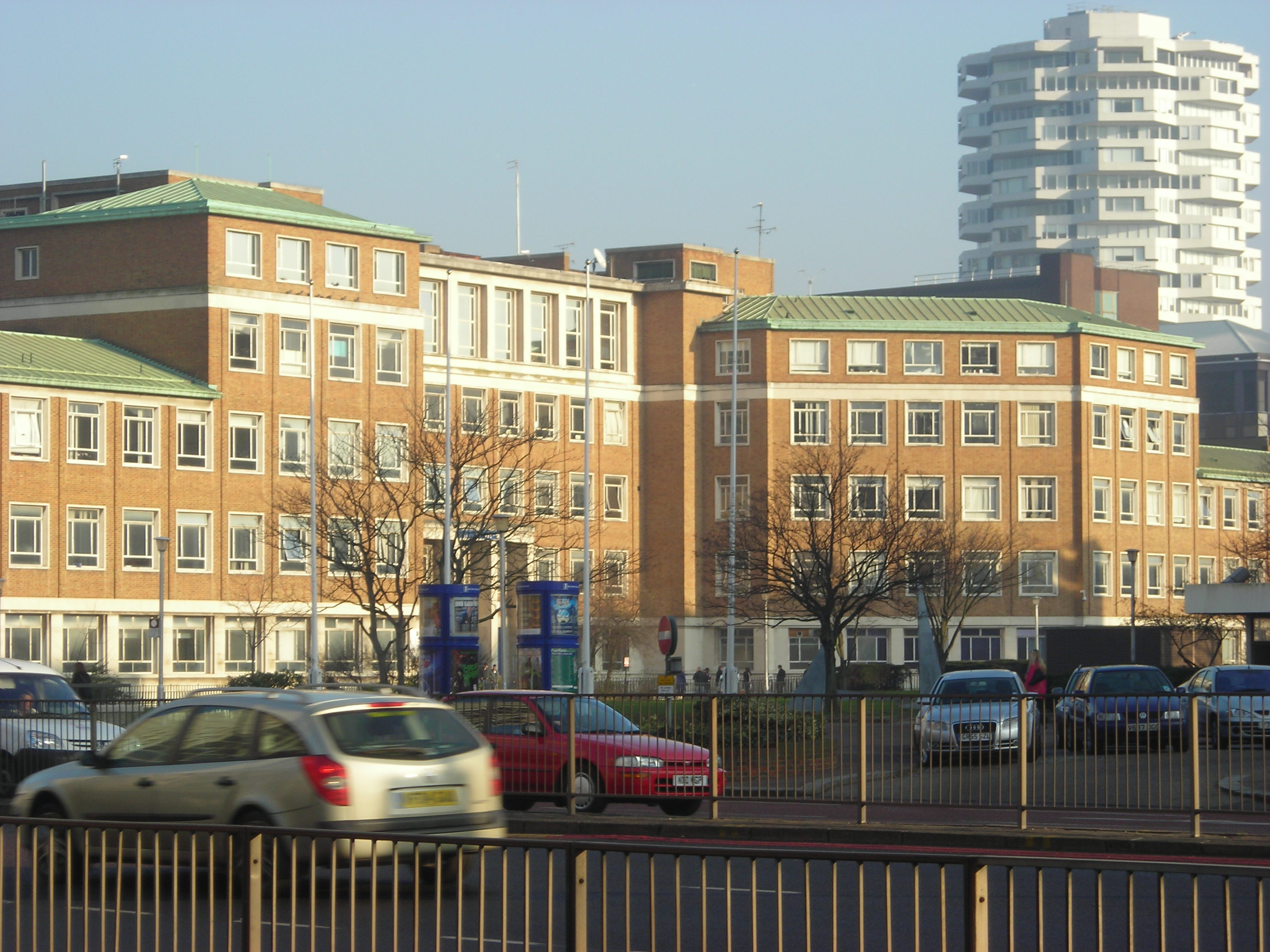
Croydon College's main buildings in Central Croydon

The town has several fee-paying schools, three of which are part of the Whitgift Foundation. Two are boys' schools (though Trinity School has a co-educational sixth form): Whitgift School was situated near the Almshouses until 1931 when it moved to its current site in Haling Park in South Croydon, the Middle School (renamed Trinity School of John Whitgift in 1954) remained on the site until 1965 when it moved to Shirley Park. A direct grant grammar school until 1968, it is now a member of the Headmasters' Conference. Old Palace School, an independent girls' school situated in the old Summer Palace of the Archbishops of Canterbury, joined the Whitgift Foundation group of schools in 1993, but closed in 2025. Croham Hurst School, an independent girls' school in South Croydon, became part of Old Palace in 2007 and its old buildings were subsequently used as the Old Palace junior school. The site of the old Whitgift grammar school is now the Whitgift shopping centre whose freehold is owned by the Whitgift Foundation. Croydon High School is an independent (fee paying) girls' school in Selsdon, and a member of the Girls' Day School Trust. Royal Russell School is a co-educational independent (fee paying) boarding and day school in South Croydon and is a member of the Headmasters' Conference.

Croydon is also home to three single-sex Catholic state schools. The formerly independent John Fisher School in Purley has not charged fees since the late 1970s, but during the 1990s was selective, choosing boys via exams, interviews, tests, previous school reports and written statements. The school ended its selection policy in 1999, and now accepts pupils under a points system, which favours those who have high mass attendance. Coloma Convent Girls' School is a Catholic girls' school formerly a grammar school, it has now, like John Fisher, adopted points-based admission criteria. St Joseph's College, on Beulah Hill in Upper Norwood, is a boys' school with a mixed sixth form. Thomas More is a Catholic mixed state school.
