= 46 South End =

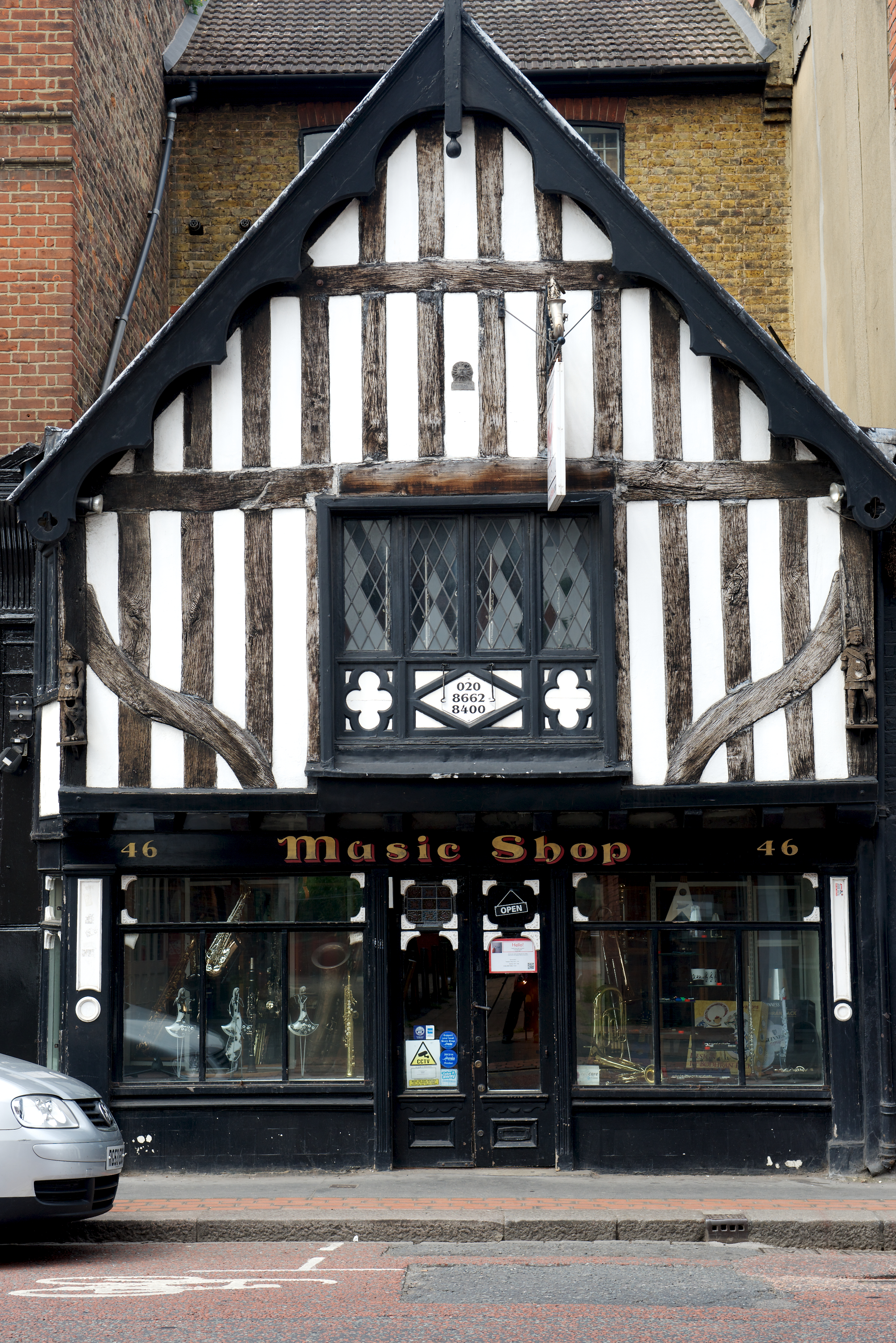

- Location within Greater London
- 51.365809°N 0.09910509°W
- Location: South Croydon
- OS grid reference: TQ 32417 64684

History
- Built: 17th century

Site notes
- Area: Croydon, England

Listed Building – Grade II
- Designated: 29 Jan 1951
- Reference no.: 1079270

46 South End, located in South Croydon, is Croydon's oldest surviving shop. The building is Grade II listed, dating back to the 17th century. The building retains its original timber framing and the front has distinctive and attractive elevations. The rear of the building is partly of modern construction. Since 1985 it has been home to Just Flutes, a music shop.

== History ==
The original nature of the building, or who early occupants were is unknown. Records of street directories dating back to 1851 give the names E. C. Johnson & Thorpe, though no detail of the usage of the premises at the time. After an unoccupied period, the shop was a pork butchers for around 20 years.

From 1900 for 58 years, it was lived in by J. Gladwish, who established Gladwish's, a grocery and provisions shop.

In 1962 the property was bought by Mr Brian Trengove. He moved his business, Trengove Antiques, from a previous shop, which was demolished to make way for the Croydon Flyover. On several occasions, attempts at selling the property were made as seen by a newspaper article, dated October 6, 1982

== Alterations ==
It is thought that at some point in the 1950s, the southern portion of the original house was demolished, and a three-storey building erected in its place.

== Modern use ==
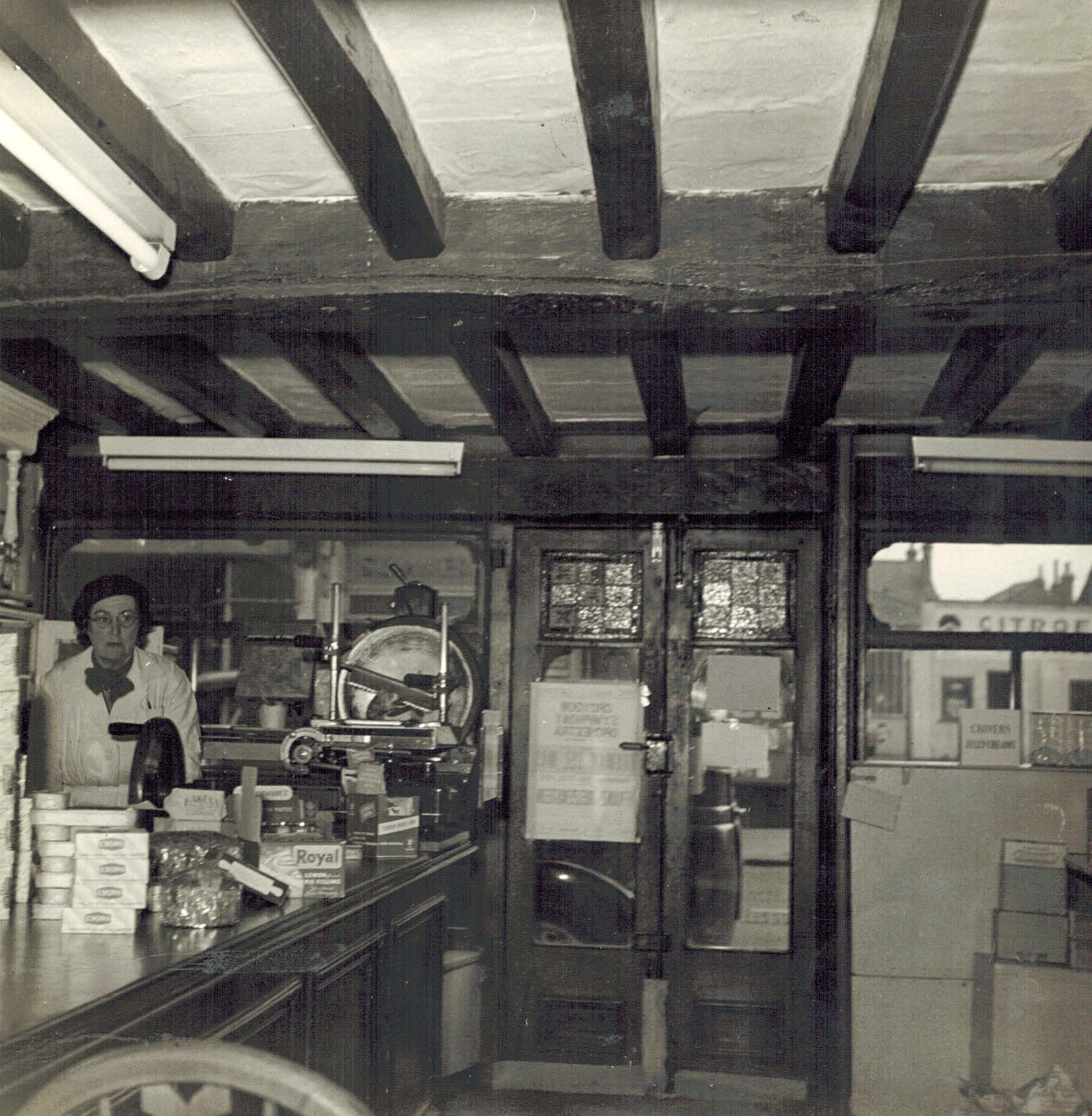
46 South End, Interior

In 1998 the building was purchased by Jonathan Myall after moving from his existing shop in Coulsdon. The building is now used as a woodwind and brass specialist music retail outlet, Just Flutes, with an internationally renowned main speciality in flutes.
