= Catholic points-based admission school =

Type of school in England

Catholic points-based admission schools are certain over-subscribed Roman Catholic comprehensive schools in London and the English home counties which have adopted admissions criteria based on adherence to the Catholic faith. In order to attend these schools candidates must come from practising Catholic families, or those which are active in the Catholic Church.

The schools all have certain similarities: they recruit from across London despite being located in expensive areas; are single-sex (at least up until the 6th form); offer a traditional curriculum; have a strong focus on Catholic formation; achieve GCSE and A Level results 30–35 per cent above the national average; are strong on pupil discipline; have supportive parents; and have high Oxbridge and Russell Group entry rates. These characteristics are not dissimilar to other voluntary aided schools in London such as the Camden School for Girls, which is a non-faith school.

In September 1999 the New Labour government, on grounds of egalitarianism and increasing access, removed the right for state schools to interview pupils to assess practice of their faith. However, the London Oratory School continued to interview to assess Catholicity up until 2006, having won a court case to the effect that, while schools had to have regard to the code of admissions, it was not binding.

School	Neighbourhood	2011 5 GCSE A*-C
The London Oratory School	Fulham	90%
Cardinal Vaughan Memorial School	Kensington and Chelsea	92%
Coloma Convent Girls' School	Croydon	94%
The John Fisher School	Purley	88%
