= William Forster Lanchester =

British zoologist

William Forster Lanchester FRSE (1875–1953) was a British zoologist.

== Life ==
He was born in Croydon on 14 March 1875 to Dr Henry Thomas Lanchester MD and his wife Catherine Forster. He was one of eight children, but the only son. In 1893 he was admitted to Cambridge University. He studied Science and graduated BA in 1897 and gained an MA in 1900. He went on to work as a Demonstrator in Zoology at University College, Dundee.

He was elected a Fellow of the Royal Society of Edinburgh in 1907. His proposers were John Graham Kerr, Edward J. Bles, Malcolm Laurie and Ramsay Heatley Traquair. He resigned in 1910 when he returned to England.

In 1910 he was living at 19 Fernshaw Road in Chelsea, London, a fashionable three storey Victorian mid-terraced villa.

At the outbreak of the First World War he was in the Royal Navy Reserve so was immediately called up. However, he moved to the Royal Army Medical Corps and rose to the rank of captain.

He returned to Cambridge in later life, living at 10 St Andrews Hill in 1945.

== Academic work ==
In 1899 he and his friend from King's College, Francis Perch Bedford, had collected some crustaceans in Singapore and Malacca. He studied them and then published on gephyreans and crustaceans during the first years of the 20th century.

He is honoured in the sipunculan name Thysanocardia lanchesteri and also in the stomatopod name Gonodactylellus lanchesteri.

== Family ==
He married Grace Margaret Ainslie in 1900. They had four children.
