= Robert Barclay (historiographer) =

English Quaker historiographer

Robert Barclay (4 August 1833– 11 Nov. 1876) was an English Quaker historiographer.

== Life and education ==
Barclay was born 4 August 1833 at Croydon. He was the younger son of John Barclay. After passing through a preparatory school at Epping, he went to the Friends' school at Hitchin, conducted by Isaac Brown, afterwards head of the Flounders Institute, Ackworth. His education was finished at Bruce Grove House, Tottenham. He attained a good knowledge of botany and chemistry, was fond of electrical experiments, and had skill as a watercolour artist.

He married on 14 July 1857 Sarah Matilda, eldest daughter of Francis Fry, and had nine children, of whom six survived him. He died of a brain aneurysm on 11 November 1876.

== Business career ==
In 1855, he bought a London manufacturing stationery concern in Bucklersbury, (afterwards in College Street and Maiden Lane), taking into partnership his brother-in-law, J. D. Fry, in 1867. In March 1860 he patented an ‘indelible writing paper’ for the prevention of forgery, the process of manufacturing which he described in a communication to the Society of Arts.

== Quaker views and historiography ==
Though not 'recorded' as a minister of the Society of Friends (to which body he belonged), he preached in their meetings and missions. A posthumous volume gives thirty-six of his sermons, which were usually written, an uncommon thing with Friends.

In 1868 he delivered a lecture on the position of the Society of Friends in relation to the spread of the gospel during the last sixty years. He endorsed the view of Herbert Skeats that the early Society of Friends was the first home mission association, and was anxious to see the body regaining its position as an aggressive Christian church. He was strongly in favour of the public reading of the Bible in Friends' meetings, and thought Richard Claridge's 'Treatise of the Holy Scriptures,’ 1724, presented a more correct view of the sentiments of the early Friends than their controversial writings. He was as strongly opposed to the practice of birthright membership, introduced among Friends in 1737.

His opinions on these points led to his undertaking a series of investigations which culminated in his work on the internal constitution of the obscurer Commonwealth sects, whose origin, ramifications, and practical tendencies. His presentation of the doctrinal aspects of primitive Quakerism was criticised from the standpoint of another Friend, in an 'Examen' (1878), by Charles Evans, M.D., of Philadelphia.

== Works ==
- 'On the Truth of Christianity, compiled from … works of Archbishop Whately. Edited by Samuel Hinds, D.D., formerly Lord Bishop of Norwich,’ 1865, 18mo (three later editions).
- 'On Membership in the Society of Friends,’ 8vo [1872].
- 'The Inner Life of the Religious Societies of the Commonwealth,’ &c., 1876, large 8vo, two plates and chart (actually published 18 Jan. 1877; since twice reissued, 1877, 1878, from the stereotyped plates).
