= Zotefoams =

Foam manufacturer

Zotefoams plc
- Type: PLC Public limited company
- Traded as: LSE: ZTF
- Industry: Technical foam manufacture
- Founded: 1921
- Headquarters: London, England
- Area served: UK, USA, Japan, Europe, Asia (principal market)
- Key people: Lynn Drummond, (Chair); Ronan Cox, (CEO); Nick Wright, (CFO)
- Products: Polyolefin foams, PVDF foams, Nylon foams, TPE foams
- Revenue: ▲£158.5 million (2025)
- Operating income: ▲£21.6 million (2025)
- Net income: ▲£22.6 million (2025)
- Website: www.zotefoams.com

Zotefoams plc is a British manufacturer of closed cell, crosslinked foams made from polyolefins and engineering polymers.

== History ==
Zotefoams was founded in 1921 by Charles Marshall as Onazote Limited, initially manufacturing expanded rubber materials. During the mid‑20th century, the business transitioned towards polymer‑based foams and began producing polyethylene foams in the 1960s.

In the 1970s, the company was acquired by BP, during which period it further developed its expertise in crosslinked foam technologies. Zotefoams was demerged from BP in 1992 and subsequently listed on the London Stock Exchange in 1995 under its current name.

In May 2000, Zotefoams entered into a global sales and marketing alliance with Sekisui Chemical Company Ltd ('Sekisui'), under which Sekisui acted as agent and distributor for Zotefoams in continental Europe, Asia and some customers in North America. Later that year, a fire at the company’s manufacturing facility in Beddington, London, destroyed 30% of the building and disrupted some deliveries to customers.

During the 2010s, Zotefoams expanded its international manufacturing footprint. In 2017, the company acquired the remaining 50% shareholding in its Chinese joint venture, Kunshan Zotek King Lai, taking full ownership of its foam manufacturing operations in China.

In November 2022, Zotefoams acquired the Skanderborg-headquartered packaging material manufacturer, Refour ApS.

In November 2025, Zotefoams acquired Overseas Konstellation Company S.A. (OKC), a Spanish manufacturer of technical foams, for a consideration of up to €36 million.

In October 2026, Zotefoams acquired Verttec LLC, a manufacturer of technical roll foam based in Greenville, Pennsylvania, USA.

== Innovation ==
In 2025, Zotefoams announced the development of an expanded global innovation infrastructure. This included the establishment of a Global Innovation Hub at its long standing Croydon site in the United Kingdom, intended to consolidate research and development activities and support the creation of new foam technologies.
