= Economy of Croydon =

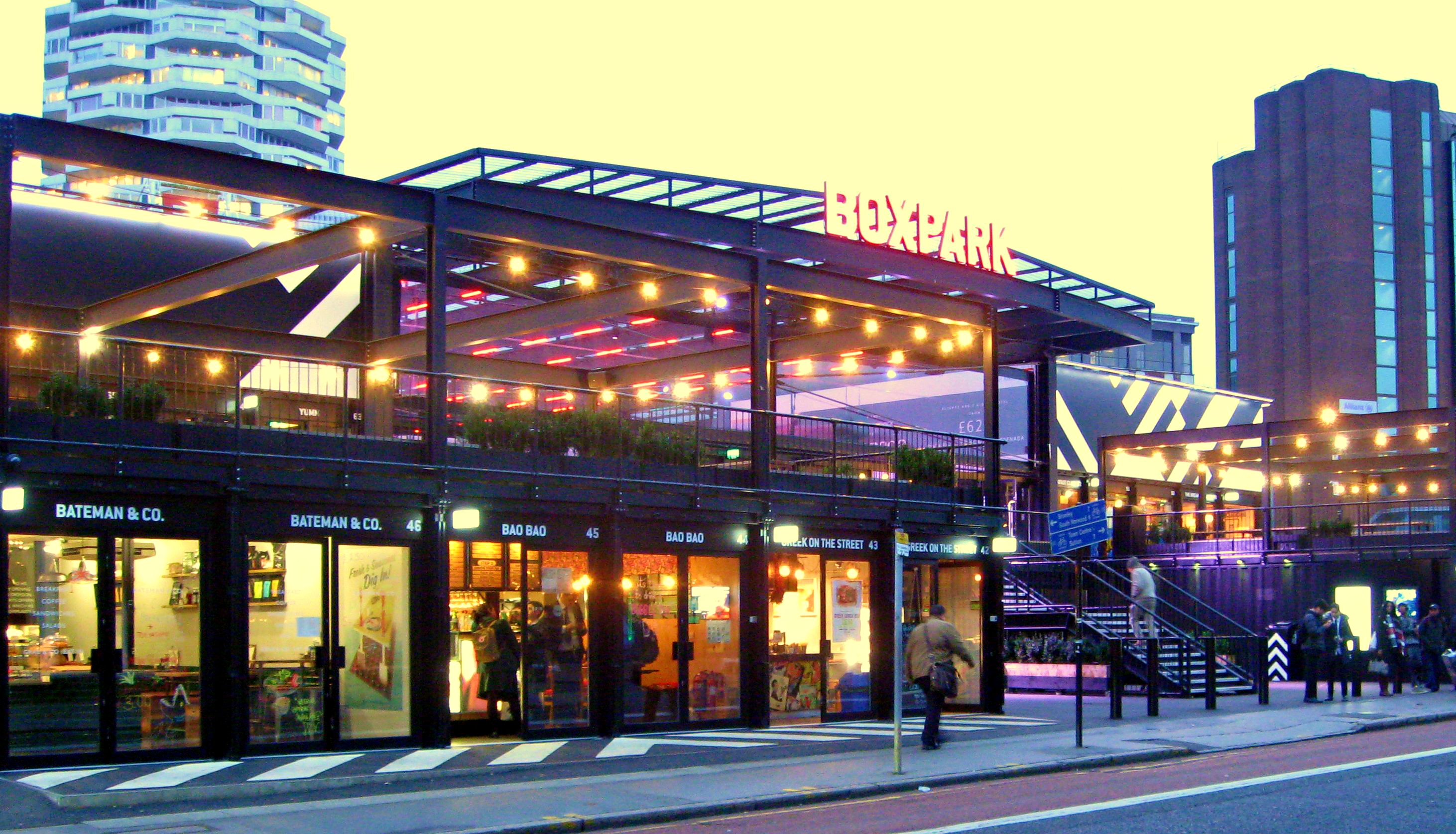
Croydon Boxpark

Croydon, located in Greater London, England, has a diverse economy with service and retail sectors surpassing the town's historical market focus.

== Economy ==
=== Transportation ===
Croydon enjoys an extensive rail network served by the East and West Croydon stations. From both stations, London Overground and Govia Thameslink operate trains to most parts of Central and Greater London, as well as Surrey, Sussex, Hampshire and East England. The A23, M23 and M25 orbital motorway intersect Croydon to the South East. It is the principal gateway of the motorway network from the East Sussex area of the South Coast. London Trams, formerly known as Croydon Tramlink, operates in many parts of Croydon and South London; in 2024, it transported 20 million passengers. The network has three main routes connecting Wimbledon, Croydon, Beckenham and New Addington. Croydon is one of only five London Boroughs that have no London Underground services.

=== Retail ===
Retail is a major service and employer in Croydon. North End is Croydon's main shopping street, with Whitgift and Allders situated on it. The town centre includes the Surrey Street Market, one of the few remaining town centre markets in the area, and three indoor shopping centres, including the Whitgift Centre and the newer Centrale centre.

=== Finance ===
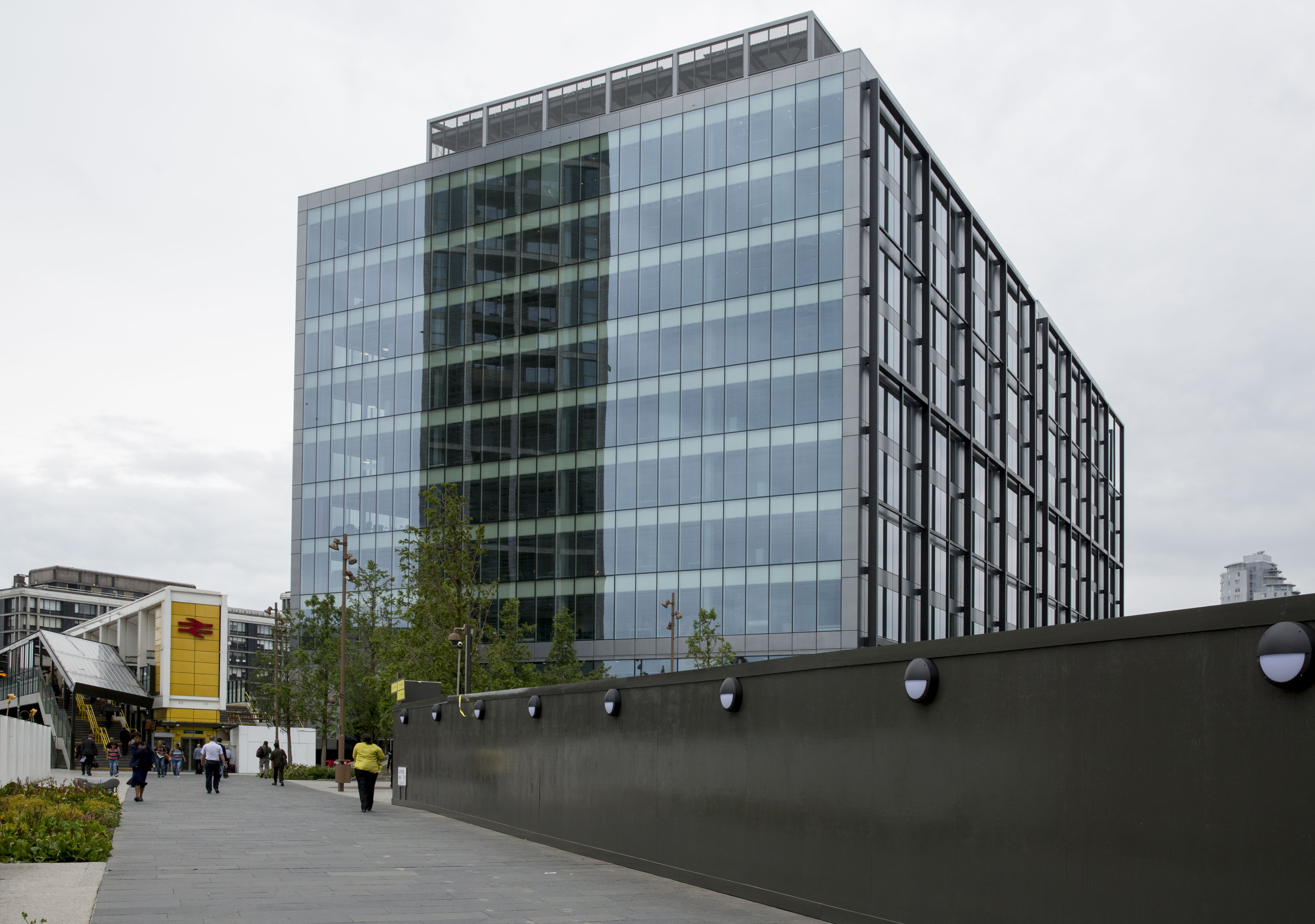
HM Revenue & Customs regional centre, Ruskin Square

Croydon is one of the largest financial centres in the South East outside of London and is home to many legal and insurance firms. Croydon is a major office area and the second largest outside of Central London. In 2024, Croydon saw a 24% increase in micro-businesses, growing faster than elsewhere in the UK.

=== International business ===
Malcolm Brabon stated, "Croydon is home to a variety of international business communities, each with dynamic business networks, so businesses located in Croydon are in a good position to make the most of international trade and recruit from a labour force fluent in 130 languages".

== Statistics ==
In 2024, the unemployment rate in Croydon was 5.7%, compared to 5.1% for the London area and 4.3% for the United Kingdom.
