= St George's Walk =

Covered shopping area in Croydon, London

Coordinates: 51°22′23″N 0°5′54″W

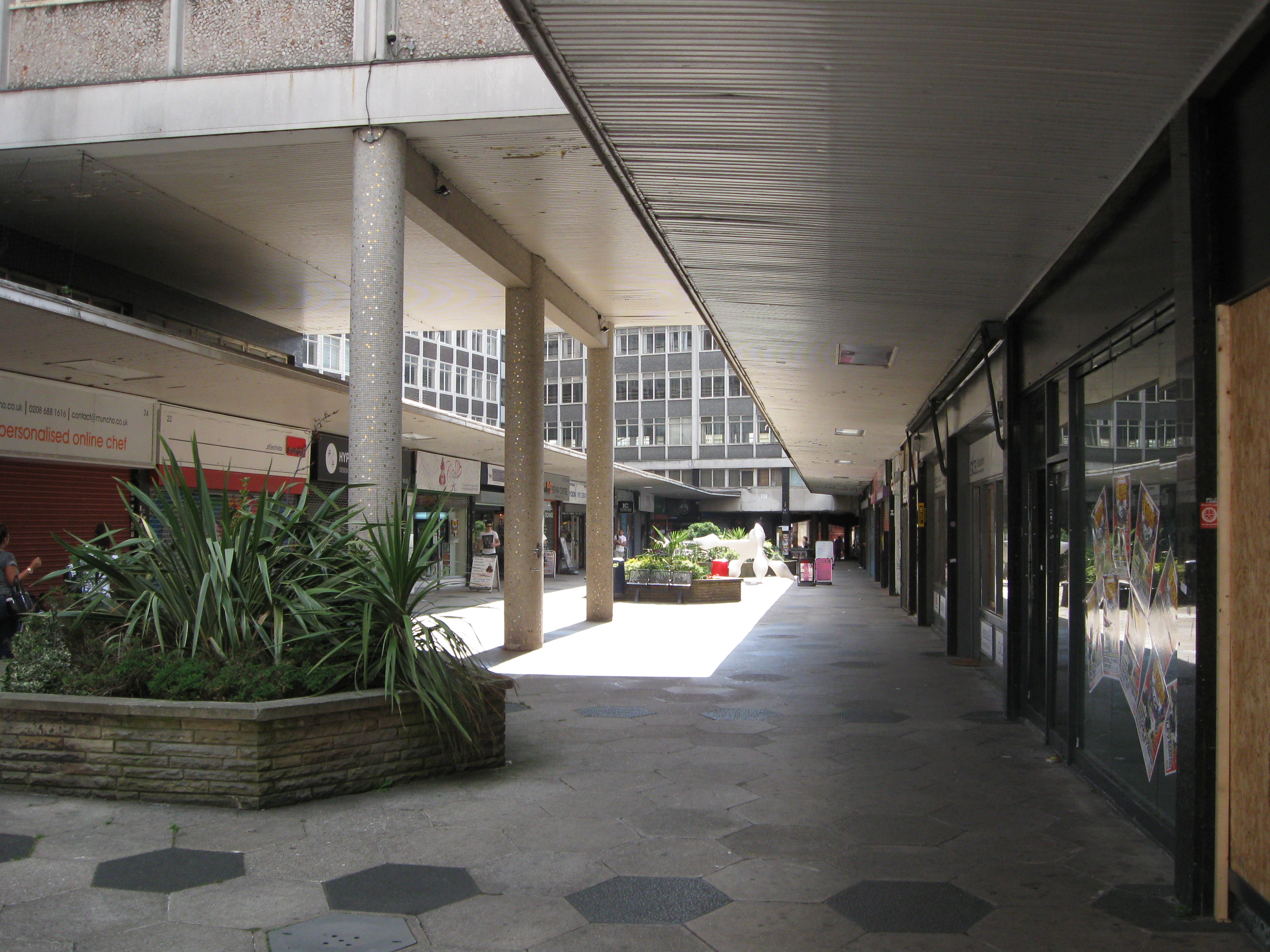
St. George's Walk 2015, western part

St George's Walk is a partially covered shopping parade in the centre of Croydon, London that houses many independent stores. It was completed in 1964 by Ronald Ward and Partners, the designers of St George's House, at one end of the walk, and Millbank Tower in Westminster.

== Location ==
St. George's Walk forms the central part of a complex bounded to the south by Katharine Street, to the north by Park Street, and to the east and west by Park Lane and High Street respectively. The complex is bisected by Fell Road. As of August 2015, only the eastern half was roofed. Nestlé's former UK headquarters, St George's House, forms part of the complex at the Park Lane end.

== History ==
The area is substantially less busy than its competitors in Croydon, Centrale, the Whitgift Centre and Surrey Street Market. This is partly because the parade does not house any well-known chains.

In 2005, a compulsory purchase order was issued by Croydon Council and it was planned to demolish St George's Walk by 2011 and replace it with the new Park Place shopping centre which would span from North End to Queen's Gardens. There had been little local opposition, but the owners of the shops facing eviction were not offered places in the new shopping centre proposed by Minerva plc. Croydon Council terminated the scheme in May 2009 due to planning permission having lapsed on the venture and concerns over funding, and a new redevelopment scheme to attract retailer John Lewis to the town was being investigated.

As a result of the uncertainty surrounding a possible redevelopment, some of the established businesses, both in the precinct and where the development formed part of neighbouring roads, either closed or re-located, and by 2010, the area had become run-down. This led to the council offering short-term leases to local traders, to try to keep the area viable.

October 2016: The CROWD initiative launched with a free live music event on St. George's Walk featuring the Hackney Colliery Band and street food stalls and in 2017 The Correspondents headlined another CROWD event, providing live music, DJs, and bars. Production was supplied by The Frantic Group Ltd, another Croydon business.

In April 2018, several units were converted to 1980s-style shops for filming of series five of Black Mirror.

In November 2018, work began on the redevelopment, with offices and shops on the south side of the complex due to be demolished to make way for a new public square to be known as Queen's Square. Work was also underway on the conversion of St George's House into residential flats.

== Transport links ==
St George's Walk has various transport links nearby. George Street is the closest Tramlink stop. From there services run to Wimbledon station with connections to the London Underground, or to Beckenham Junction station and Elmers End station (via West Croydon) with train connections to Sutton and to Central London as well as London Overground services. There are also tram services from East Croydon to New Addington, Elmers End and Beckenham. There is a bus station at West Croydon with buses on the northbound corridor and the rest of the borough and multiple bus routes serve both Park Street and Katharine Street. East Croydon station, the main Network Rail station in the borough, is close by and offers mainline services from Southern and Thameslink. These train operating companies provide fast services to Brighton and the South Coast and to London.
