= Bang! (opera) =

Bang! is an opera for young people by John Rutter to an English libretto by David Richard Grant. The opera was written for the Trinity Boys Choir, and the ensemble premiered the work at the Fairfield Halls, Croydon under conductor David Squibb on 14 March 1975.

== Synopsis ==
The story is based on The Gunpowder Plot of 1605. The Catholics were persecuted by James I of England, so they plotted to blow up the Palace of Westminster. The story is narrated by the elusive Father Garnet, leader of the Jesuits.

== Recordings ==
- Rutter - Bang! Trinity Boys Choir, Ex Trinitate Orchestra, conducted by David Squibb (Herald HAVPCD 283, 2003).
