= Roger Best =

Roger Best may refer to:

- Roger Best (rugby league)
- Roger Best (musician)
