= Paul Cropper =

British violist (1913 - 2006)

- Born: Paul Cropper; 12 March 1913; Wallasey, Cheshire, England
- Died: 15 March 2006 (aged 93) Bolton, Lancashire, England
- Genres: Classical
- Occupations: Musician, professor
- Instrument: Viola
- Formerly of: Liverpool Philharmonic Orchestra, BBC Northern Symphony Orchestra

Paul Cropper, MBE, (1913-2006) was a British violist and principal viola of the BBC Northern Symphony Orchestra (later named the BBC Philharmonic) from 1947 to 1982.

== Biography ==
Paul Cropper was born in Wallasey, Cheshire, England, on 12 March 1913. His father Horace Sydney Cropper was the principal violinist of the Liverpool Philharmonic Orchestra.

His first studies were on the violin which he studied with his father from 1924 to 1930. In 1930 he played viola with the newly formed Merseyside Orchestra. He then briefly studied with the violinist and then conductor of the Hallé Orchestra, Thomas Alfred Barker, before learning with the Danish violinist and once leader of the Berlin Philharmonic, Henry Holst, from 1933 to 1936. Whilst learning with Holst he took up a position as violist with the Liverpool Philharmonic (1934). He briefly played viola with the Hallé orchestra in 1935. After Holst, he studied viola with Lionel Tertis (1937–38) before becoming the principal violist of the Liverpool Philharmonic Orchestra in 1939.

The second world war meant that Cropper had to enlist for army duties but soon after he joined the B.B.C. Northern Symphony Orchestra (later named the BBC Philharmonic) and played with them for some thirty-five years from 1947 to 1982. He was a prolific chamber musician and played with the Charles Taylor Quartet from 1937 to 1950, the Ad Solem Piano Quintet and Ensemble 1961–76, and played for the Lindsay String Quartet in quintet and sextet recitals. His nephew, the violinist Peter Cropper, led the Lindsay Quartet for almost 40 years. He was Professor of Viola at the Royal Manchester College of Music from 1949 to 1962, where amongst his pupils was Roger Best, principal violist with the Royal Northern Sinfonia. In May 1939, whilst a member of the Charles Taylor String Quartet, Cropper’s viola was stolen and a broadcast performance from Bluecoat Chambers in Liverpool had to be abandoned.

He played Mozart's Sinfonia Concertante for Violin and Viola some ten times with the Liverpool Philharmonic and the B.B.C. symphony orchestras.

He played Harold in Italy on three occasions with the B.B.C.N.S.O and Don Quixote no less than seven times with such cellists as Thomas Igloi, Maurice Gendron in 1964, Paul Tortelier in 1967, Mstislav Rostropovich c.1975 and Heinrich Schiff in 1976.

He performed Ernest Bloch’s Suite for Viola and Orchestra in Liverpool in 1947 and again on December 5 and 14, 1950, with Charles Groves directing the BBC Northern Orchestra. He premiered performances of Humphrey Procter-Gregg’s Sonata for Viola and Piano in 1975.

He was made a Fellow of the Royal Manchester College of Music in 1959 and received an MBE for services to music in the Queen's Birthday Honours in 1981.

In 1984 he was on the jury for the prestigious Lionel Tertis International Viola Competition.

He was married to Brenda Old, a violinist with the Liverpool Philharmonic Society Orchestra. He died on 15 March 2006, at age 93.
