= Dog & Bull =

Public house in south London, England

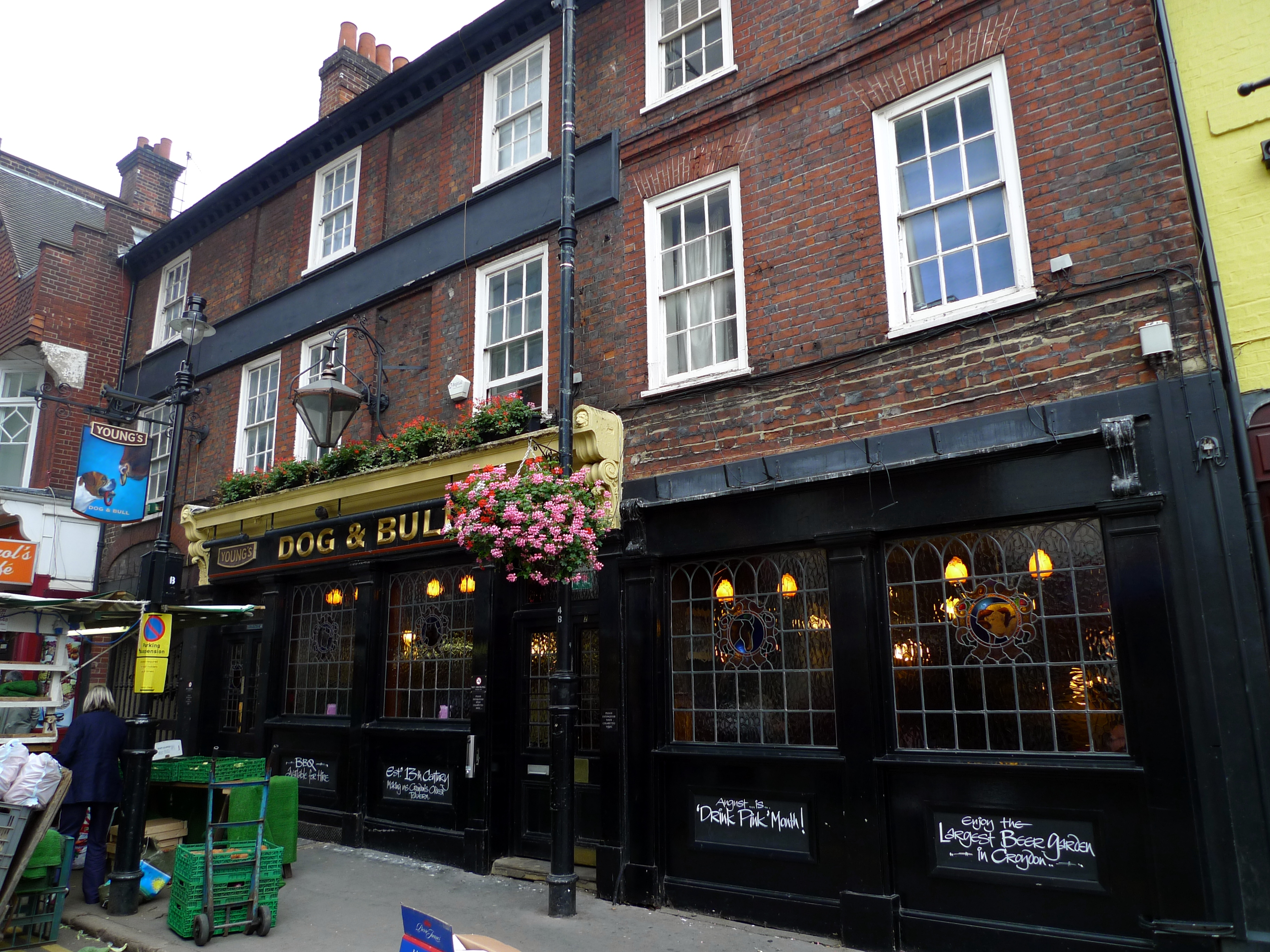
- Frontage in 2011
- Interactive map of the Dog & Bull area
- Former names: The Bell

General information
- Location: 24 Surrey Street
- Coordinates: 51°22′23″N 00°06′06″W

Website
- www.thedog.pub

The Dog & Bull is a public house in Croydon, England. It is a Grade II listed, 18th-century building with a 19th-century frontage in Surrey Street, on the site of a previous 12th- or 13th-century inn called The Bell.

The Dog & Bull was number 24 with an associated yard which was once used as an animal pound when the street was known as Butcher's Row. In the 1990s, the adjacent grocery at number 25 was merged into the pub and the yard was converted into a beer garden. The pub was part of the Young's brewery chain from the 1830s until 2025. The pub is now a "Laine" pub owned by Punch Pubs and rebranded as The Dog.

The pub has hosted a variety of events including a formal inquest in the 19th century, regular live jazz music by Don Weller in the 20th century and a religious blessing of its beer in the 21st century.

== History ==
Dog & Bull, 2014

The pub's name refers to the blood sport of bull-baiting, and the Dog & Bull is "understood to be the oldest pub in Croydon". The current Dog & Bull was built in the 18th century and is Grade II listed. There was previously a pub called The Bell on the site which was established in the 12th or 13th century when Surrey Street was built up and its street market established. (Note: Some sources, e.g. this one suggest a correlation between the 1276 royal grant for the Surrey Street market and the original establishment the Dog & Bull's precursor, the Bell inn. However the Victoria County History suggests that there were originally markets across the town, and that there were pre-existing inns in Croydon in 1276.) Near the Dog & Bull, archaeologists have found a "medieval stone-vaulted undercroft", although it is not known whether this was the cellar of the Bell inn.

The Dog & Bull is constructed of red brick with wooden eaves and sash windows. The inn frontage dates from the 19th century. The business now occupies two street numbers – 24 and 25 – as the adjacent grocery of A. E. Pearce, which specialised in bacon and cheese, was merged into the premises in the early 1990s.

This public house had an associated yard – the "Dog & Bull Yard". It had a well and watering troughs and was used as a pound for stray animals and cattle when Surrey Street was known as "Butcher's Row". The area is now used as a beer garden following renovations in the early 1990s. The pub also features a real fireplace, along with stained glass windows depicting the titular dog and bull.

The Dog & Bull was a tied house in Young's brewery chain under lease from 1832 and then acquired by the brewery in 1899. Its two regular draught beers were thus Young's Bitter and Young's Special, with two guest ales also on tap.

In 2025 the pub changed hands, reopening as The Dog on 9 May 2025. The pub is now a "Laine" pub, owned by Punch Pubs.

== Past events ==
In the early 18th century, landlord Nicholas Northorpe of the Bell or the Dog and Bull was sentenced to death for felony. In 1820, the Surrey Coroner, Charles Jemmett, held an inquest at the Dog and Bull. A 9-year-old girl had burnt to death near Butcher's Row and the jury returned a verdict of accidental death.

One of the earlier landlords of the Dog & Bull was George Eliff, who died on 1 October 1847. He hosted the anniversary of the Loyal Victoria Odd Fellows' lodge at the Dog & Bull on 26 September 1846. In 1849 there was a robbery in the Dog & Bull yard. Richard Garland was committed to trial for snatching a handkerchief containing 1s 6d (equivalent to £8.24 in 2025) from the hand of Mary Vickers.

In 1866 Elijah and Eliza King, the landlord and landlady of the Dog and Bull, were witnesses in a horse-stealing case. Alfred and Charles Brazier, and George Roberts, were charged with "feloniously receiving stolen horses". The "persevering and indefatigable" Superintendent Young had travelled between Buckinghamshire and Croydon with the victim of the theft, and retrieved the animals. The court was presented with an involved story featuring dishonest deals and forged receipts; Elijah and Eliza King were the innocent victims of one of those horse-sales.

The Kings were landlords of the Dog and Bull for some years. In 1869 the licensee was Clara Jane King. A later landlord of the inn was Arthur King. In 1898 he found a "powerful jemmy about a foot and a half long" (0.46 metres) in a wagonette which had been placed in his safekeeping by police. George Barney, Arthur Wilkinson and Walter Parker had been spotted trying to force a gate lock at the Railway Hotel. With Barney as the getaway driver they had tried to escape in the wagonette, and "amid an exciting scene" the miscreants were captured. (Note: The Railway Hotel was a public house. See Railway Hotel, 130 George Street, Croydon, Surrey)

== Recent events ==
Dog & Bull, 2021

In 1994 the licensees were Ann and Frank Egan. By 2018 the licensee was Daniel Chapman. In July 2020 the Dog & Bull took part in the British government scheme Eat Out to Help Out. As of 2021 the licensees are Lesley and Mark Knight.

=== Music and festivals ===
The jazz saxophonist Don Weller led his band Major Surgery in weekly performances at the Dog & Bull for six years in the 1970s. Producer Malcolm Mills described the scene then.

It's a typical smoke-filled, rowdy, market boozer, jammed tight with traders, art students, jazzers, drop-outs, drunks and hustlers. There's a record player behind the bar and astonishingly, the album is "The Inner Mounting Flame". By popular demand, the guv'nor – Norman – regularly allows the miniscule [sic] space next to the stinking Gents toilet to be given up one night a week to Major Surgery. Squashed at the back with the open window behind him is Tony Marsh with his crazy assortment of old drums and cymbals. Sitting next to him on his right is bass player Bruce Collcutt with guitarist Jimmy Roche standing on his left. In front of them all is the barrel-chested, bearded, Tenor Titan, Don Weller and they are collectively raising the roof with their trademark racket. There is not an inch of space. Ale is swilled, fags are smoked and the jug is passed round for the guys. It’s very, very special and we’re all diggin' it like mad...

Around 2010, the landlady of the Dog & Bull organised an annual street festival. In 2016, the vicar of Croydon Minster, Father Lee Taylor led a procession to the pub to bless its beer.

== Popular culture ==
Surrey Street is often used as a filming location and so the Dog & Bull appeared several times in the long-running TV show, The Bill, which was ostensibly set in the East End.

== Accolades and reviews ==
Pevsner describes the red brick frontage of the Dog & Bull as "especially handsome". In 1994, it was CAMRA's London Pub of the Year and again, in 2016, it was CAMRA's Croydon & Sutton Pub of the Year. In 2018, The Londonist said that the establishment is a successful mix of a "proper pub" and "trendy bar", with a "real local vibe".

== Notable guests ==
Prince Charles visited the Dog & Bull in 1994 when he came to Croydon to meet the stall-holders at Surrey Street Market.

== Further research ==
- Lovett, Vivien (15 September 1995). Surrey Street, Croydon, a stall story, 100 years of market trading (1 ed.). Frosted Earth. ISBN 978-0951671054.
