= Russell Hill, Croydon =

Coordinates: 51.353318°N 0.126708°W

Russell Hill
- Location within Greater London
- OS grid reference: TQ3042963303
  - Charing Cross: 17.1 mi (27.5 km) N
- London borough: Croydon
- Ceremonial county: Greater London
- Region: London
- Country: England
- Sovereign state: United Kingdom
- Post town: PURLEY
- Postcode district: CR8
- Dialling code: 020
- Police: Metropolitan
- Fire: London
- Ambulance: London
- UK Parliament: Croydon South
- London Assembly: Croydon and Sutton

Russell Hill is an area in the London Borough of Croydon, located to the north-west of Purley.

It is named after the former prime minister John Russell, 1st Earl Russell, who was President of the Warehousemen, Clerks and Drapers School which was built here in 1866. Prior to this the locality was known as Beggar's Thorn or Beggar's Bush, since at least the 10th century and survived until the early 20th century. The area is now home to Margaret Roper Catholic Primary School and Thomas More Catholic School.

== School ==
The school was designed by the Birmingham architect John George Bland in a Venetian gothic style of red brick and is a Grade II listed building. The foundation stone was laid by the Prince of Wales (future King Edward VII) on 11th July 1863, who subsequently opened it on 18th June 1866. The event was attended by the school's president Prime Minister, Earl Russell, the mayor of London and the Bishop of Winchester, among others. The grounds are said to have been laid out by Sir Joseph Paxton. The boarding school was built on behalf of Warehousemen and Clerks for the education of orphans and necessitous children, which had outgrown Hatcham Grove House at New Cross. Perhaps unusual for the time, it included both boys and girls, although they were segregated. The Warehousemen and Clerks built a similar school at Cheadle Hume. In 1883 the Worshipful Company of Drapers, a London Livery company sought to establish an orphanage, which led to the school being renamed as the Warehousemen, Clerks and Drapers' school.

After the first World War, the girls moved to a new site gifted by Charles Goschen known as Ballards, which became known as Russell School and Royal Russell School in 1853. Perhaps fittingly the foundation stone for the chapel was laid in 1924 by the Prince of Wales, the grandson of Edward VII. The boys moved to Ballards in 1961, and the school on Russell Hill was sold to the Roman Catholic Diocese of Southwark in 1962, which established Thomas More and Margaret Roper catholic schools on the site.

== Reservoir ==
On the northeast outskirts, at the south end of the Purley Way playing fields is Russell Hill reservoir. It was opened on 11th July 1923 by Croydon's mayor, Alderman T W Wood Roberts. At that time Croydon Corporation was responsible for supplying the borough's sanitation. Croydon's population growth and finite water sources meant there was a risk that peak demand could not be met, particularly during droughts. The corporation's engineer, George F Carter, had proposed a new reservoir at Russell Hill as early as 1911, which was estimated to cost £91,000, three times the cost of the newly opened Waddon pumping station. The high cost caused delay while an independent report was commissioned by the consulting engineer Vaux Graham, an enquiry by the government's Local Government Board in 1913 and World War 1 fought; the final cost was £900,000. Despite holding 10M gallons, over 10 times the capacity of the Park Hill reservoir it replaced, this represented just two days supply. The reservoir supplied premises lower than the reservoir (Croydon's low-level district) with water from Waddon and Surrey Street pumping stations.

The 454’(138.4m) by 200’(61m) rectangular reservoir was mainly constructed out of concrete, with the reinforced concrete roof supported on 366 pillars, buried under 18”(0.5m) of soil. The depth of water in the reservoir was up to 18’(5.6m) deep.

In 1939 the Metropolitan water board became responsible for Croydon's sanitation under a new corporation bill. This became Thames Water Authority on 1st April 1974 and Thames Water following the 1989 privatisation, who now own the c.100 year old reservoir.
