= Thomas Igloi =

British cellist (1947–1976)

Thomas George Igloi (17 January 1947 – 17 April 1976) was a British cellist. He was born in Budapest, Hungary and started playing the cello at the age of eight with Emöke Csáth-Vasváry,

== Early life and education ==
Igloi was born in 1947. In June 1957, following the Hungarian uprising, he emigrated with his parents and younger brother to Wolverhampton, England, and for a short while was a pupil at Wolverhampton Municipal Grammar School. Leslie Sutton, on the staff of the Birmingham School of Music, accepted him as a student and for nearly two years guided him during this formative period of his career. He joined the Midland Youth Orchestra under Blyth Major and on several occasions in later years was able to return as a soloist for the orchestra's concerts.

Following the family's move to Croydon, Surrey in 1959, he obtained a music scholarship to continue his secondary education at the Trinity School of John Whitgift. He pursued his cello studies at the International Cello Centre, London under Milly Stanfield and Maurice Eisenberg. He won prizes at music festivals and scored successes in music exams, eventually gaining the Silver Medal of the Associated board of the royal schools of music. As a member of the National Youth Orchestra of Great Britain he became principal 'cellist and subsequently appeared as a soloist with the orchestra.

His British citizenship was granted in 1963. In the following year, he entered the Royal Academy of Music on the coveted Ada Lewis Scholarship and his training continued there with Douglas Cameron. He was placed second in the Queen's Prize, one of this country's leading competitions for young professionals, and he further distinguished himself by winning all the academy 'cello and chamber music prizes for which he was eligible. He left the academy in 1967 and was appointed as a full member of the professorial staff in 1976.

== Career ==
Igloi won the BBC Cello Competition with a "remarkable interpretation" of Dvorak’s cello concerto. brought him national recognition. He went on to win prizes at the Geneva and Vienna International Competitions which resulted in the award of a Gulbenkian Fellowship to participate in a course of intensive study held by Pablo Casals in Puerto Rico in 1967.

Music critics consistently acclaimed his performances. "He is a force to be reckoned with . . ." wrote The Times after his auspicious London Wigmore Hall debut in 1969. The guidance he received from Pierre Fournier at this stage in his development proved of infinite benefit to his playing. The last competition in which he participated was the Gaspar Cassado International Competition which he won in Florence in 1971. This was followed by an increasing number of prestigious individual engagements and two extensive tours of Italy. He made an impressive impact on the musical scene with his commanding performance of the Bach Suites for unaccompanied 'cello, in London (1972), at the Kennedy Centre (1973), and Vienna (1974). He reaped many musical successes in his concerts and broadcasts in the UK as well as abroad in Germany, Italy, Norway, Sweden, Portugal, Switzerland and Greece in addition to Austria and the U.S. Numerous BBC recordings have been archived in the British Library.

For his Henry Wood Promenade Concert debut in 1974 he played the Elgar cello concerto, with Sir Charles Groves, and the Royal Liverpool Philharmonic Orchestra. He appeared at numerous important Festivals, one which gave him particular pleasure was the Marlboro Festival, U.S., under the direction of Rudolf Serkin. At the Bath and English Bach Festivals he played chamber music with Alan Civil, Clifford Curzon, Leon Goossens, Heinz Holliger and Yehudi Menuhin. The recording of the Schubert String Quintet with the Alberni Quartet (CRD 1018) was nominated for a Grammy for best chamber music performance in 1976.

The commercial recordings (playing his 1762 Joseph Gagliano instrument), with his regular pianist Clifford Benson of the two Faure sonatas (CRD 1016) and the Britten Cello Sonata for an Open University Project (A304OU16), offer rare reminders of his artistry. Thus, before he had reached the age of 30, Thomas Igloi had already made a significant contribution to the international musical life. He had well covered all the accepted criteria for an established British concert artist having played in the principal concert halls and with the leading conductors and orchestras.

His broad repertory included the most popular concertos, but also embraced pieces by Lennox Berkeley, Frank Bridge and Wilfred Josephs. In January 1975, he premiered Naresh Sohal's 'Dhyan I' for 'cello and orchestra with the BBC Symphony Orchestra conducted by David Atherton at The Round House, London. In 1975 he gave the first performance of the cello concerto by Arnold Cooke with the BBC Symphony Orchestra under Sir Charles Groves at the 81st season of Proms.

== Death ==
Apparently in excellent health, he died of heart failure in his sleep at his home in Croydon on 17 April 1976. Several of his close associates performed tribute concerts during the following months.
