= Howard Davis (musician) =

British violinist

- Born: 9 April 1940
- Died: 5 February 2008 (aged 67)
- Occupation: violinist
- Known for: Alberni Quartet leader
- Spouse: Virginia Black
- Children: 2 (including Guy and Oliver Davis)

Howard Davis (9 April 1940 – 5 February 2008) was a British violinist, best known as the leader for more than 35 years of the Alberni Quartet. He was greatly respected both as a refined player and as an inspirational and influential teacher. He was a student at the Royal Academy of Music in London from 1958 to 1963 and became professor of violin in 1982.

He played on a Carlo Tononi violin which was sold to the Royal Academy of Music towards the end of his career. He owned many other valuable instruments and many bows.

Howard also had a house in Northern France where he went often in the holidays. He had a concert hall built there to give recitals by himself and his pupils.

Howard Davis died on 5 February 2008 of a respiratory disease. His wife, Virginia Black, and their two sons survive him.
