= Richard Nowell (cricketer) =

English cricketer (born 1975)

Richard Nowell (born 29 December 1975, Croydon, Greater London) is an English ex-professional cricket player with Surrey County Cricket Club in the period 1995–6. His batting style was left-hand bat and his bowling style was slow left-arm orthodox.

Nowell was educated at Trinity School of John Whitgift.
