= Surrey Street Market =

Market in Croydon, south London

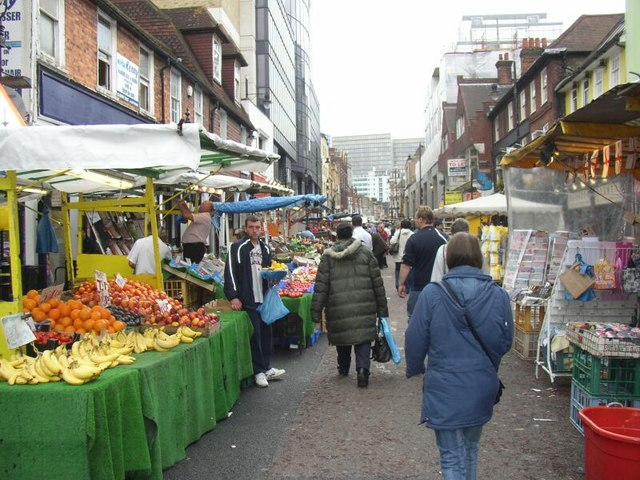
- Location: Surrey Street; Croydon, Greater London; 51°22′21.7″N 0°6′4.5″W
- Opening date: 1276 (chartered)
- Management: Croydon London Borough Council
- Owner: Croydon London Borough Council
- Environment: Outdoor
- Days normally open: Monday–Saturday
- Number of tenants: 75
- Website: www.surreystreetmarket.org.uk
- Interactive map of Surrey Street Market

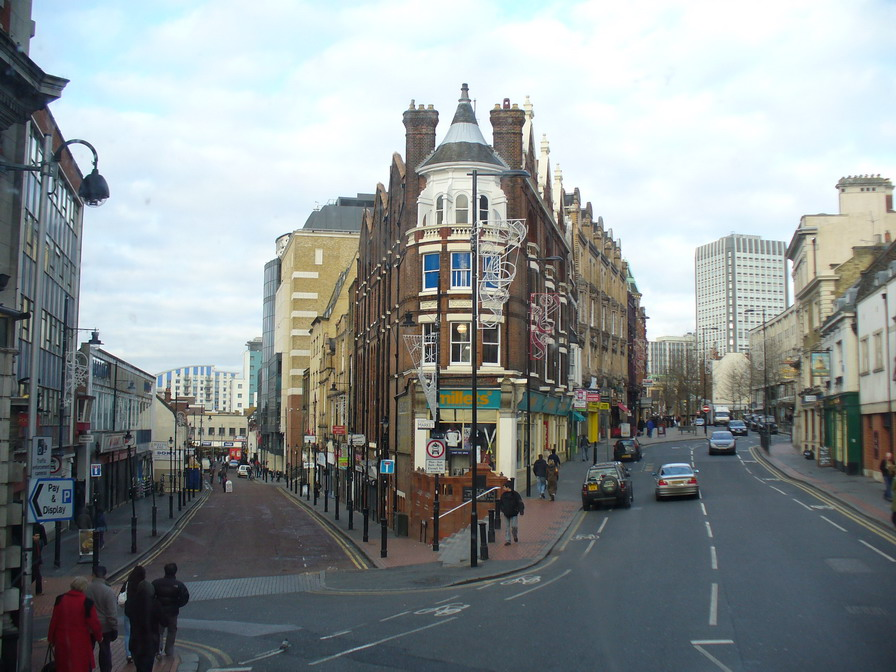
The junction of Surrey Street (to the left) and the High Street (to the right)

Surrey Street Market (also known as Croydon Market) is a street market located in Surrey Street, Croydon, south London. Records of a market on the site date back to the 13th century.

It operates six days a week, Monday to Saturday, and mainly sells fruit and vegetables.

== History ==
A market may have existed in Croydon as early as the Anglo-Saxon period, but the earliest certain record is from 1236–7, when an isolated account roll refers to stallage fees. A market charter was granted to the town by Robert Kilwardby, Archbishop of Canterbury, in 1276; and further charters were granted in 1314 by Archbishop Walter Reynolds, and (probably) in c.1343 by Archbishop John de Stratford.

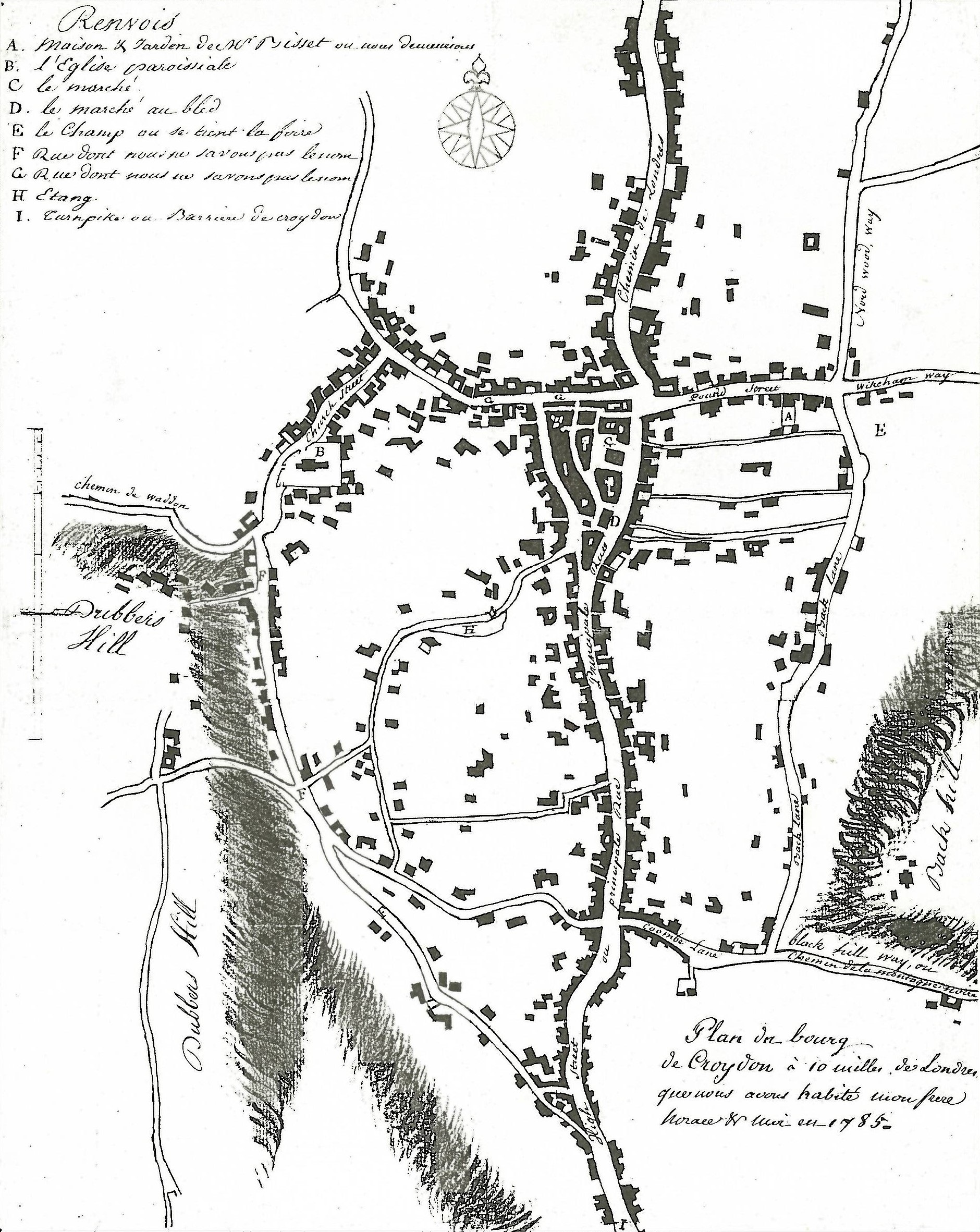
Jean-Baptiste Say's map of Croydon, 1785. The triangular medieval marketplace, bounded by Butcher Row (now Surrey Street) to the west and the High Street to the east, is already largely infilled with buildings.

The medieval marketplace, perhaps laid out in 1276, occupied the triangle of land now defined by the High Street, Surrey Street, and Crown Hill. To take advantage of the slope of the ground, it seems that the higher and well-drained east side came to be used for corn-trading, and the lower-lying west side (Butcher Row, now Surrey Street) for trading in livestock, meat, and hides. By the later Middle Ages, however, the open marketplace was becoming infilled with buildings. A building on the east side was bought for use as a market house (mainly for corn-trading) in 1566, and was succeeded by another cornmarket nearby in 1609. The older market house was probably taken over as a general provisions market, and was rebuilt for that purpose (as the so-called Butter Market) in 1708. It continued to be used until 1874. The street included an inn called The Bell which was later rebuilt as the Dog & Bull in the 18th century. This had a yard with a well and watering troughs which was used as a pound for stray animals and cattle.

The charter of 1276 had authorised a weekly market to be held on Wednesdays; that of 1314 a weekly market on Thursdays (probably superseding the Wednesday market); and that of c.1343 a weekly market on Saturdays. The earliest mention of markets actually being held on Saturday dates from 1595, and the market day remained Saturday until the middle of the 19th century. In 1861, however, the cornmarket was moved to Thursday, and was held on that day until corn-trading ended in 1907. A minority of traders, mistrusting the change, continued to hold a rival Saturday cornmarket until 1892. The general provisions market continued to be held officially on Saturdays until 1874, when the Butter Market building closed; and afterwards as an unofficial Saturday street market.

Although much of the old marketplace triangle was built up by the 19th century, a small open space remained on Market Street, immediately behind the Butter Market building, and this became the main focus of street trading. However, in 1893 the entire triangle (by this date known as Middle Row) was comprehensively cleared and redeveloped by Croydon Corporation. This development pushed all street trading activities into Surrey Street.

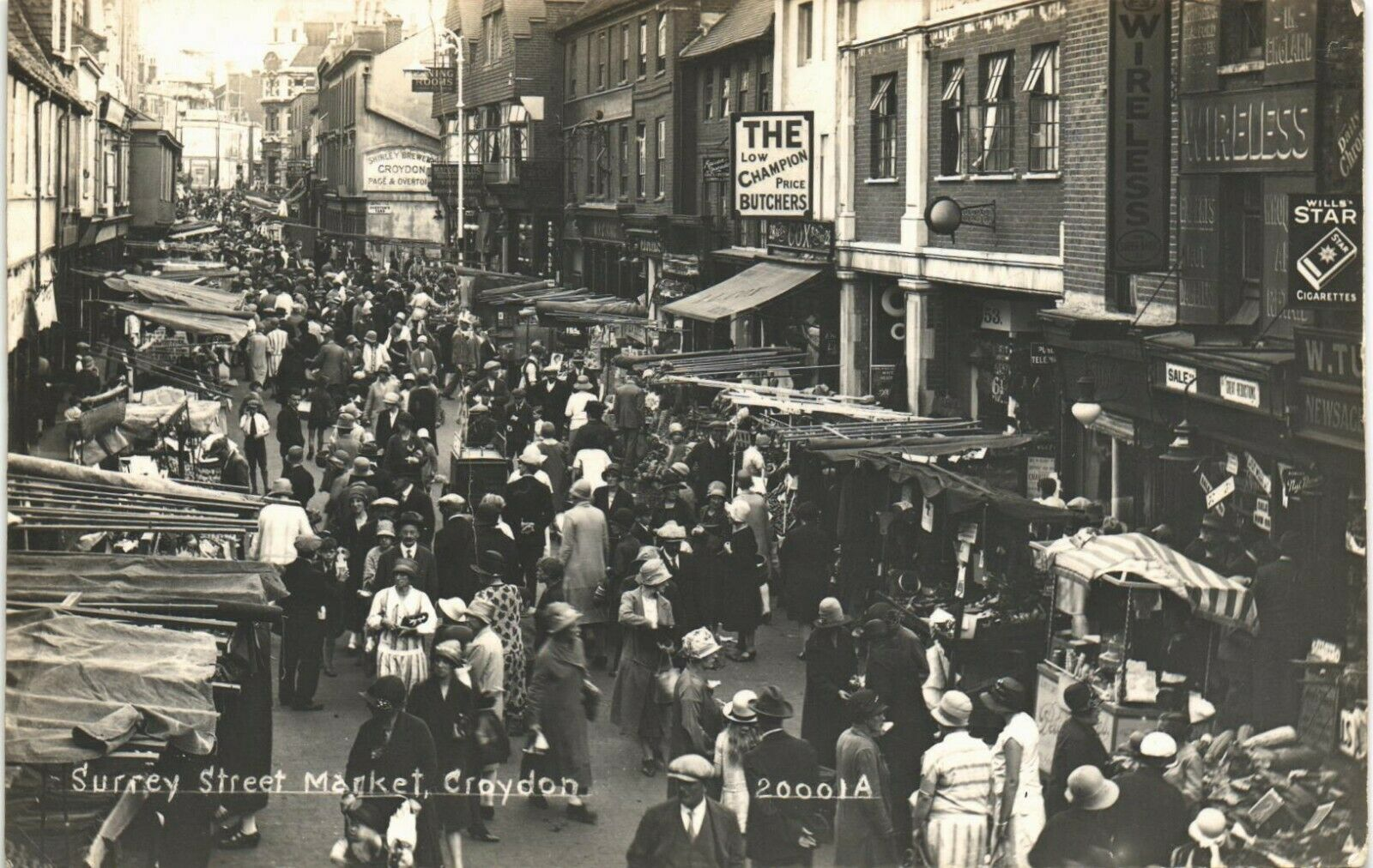
The market in 1925

In 1922, the street market was taken over by Croydon Corporation, and relaunched as a 6-day market (Monday to Saturday), which it remains. Saturday continues to be the busiest trading day.

In November 1994 the market was visited by Charles, Prince of Wales and then again in November 2026 to celebrate the 750th anniversary.

== Present day ==
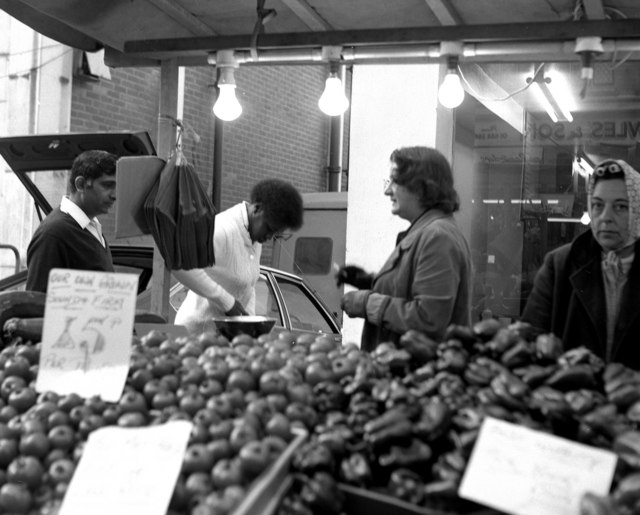
Market stall, 1978

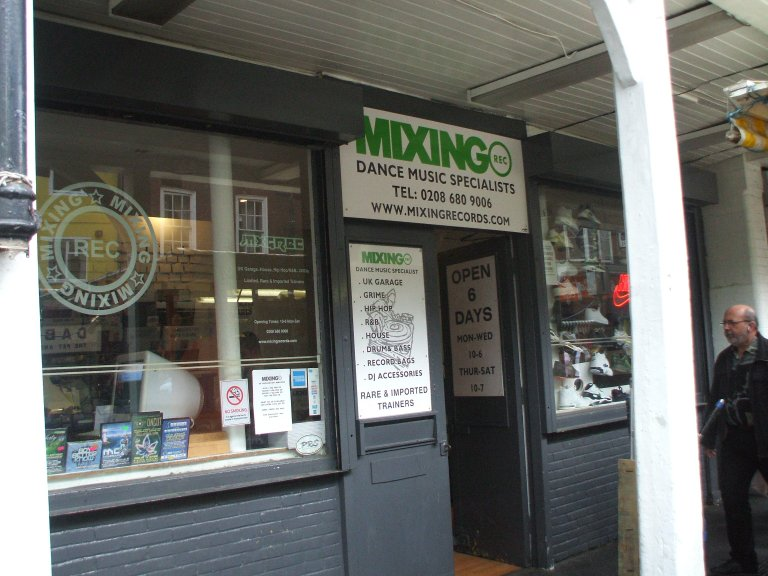
A shop on Surrey Street

Surrey Street is located behind the Grants of Croydon entertainment complex. The market stretches the whole length of the road. In 2024 there were 68 stalls in the street, and shops including Iceland and KFC. The market is regularly used as a location for television, film and advertising. From 1997 to 2012, Croydon Council ran an annual "Good Stall Award" to encourage stallholders to maintain good trading practices.

== See also ==
- St George's Walk
- Surrey Street Pumping Station, Croydon
- North End, Croydon
