= Barnaby Lenon =

British schoolmaster (born 1954)

Barnaby Lenon CBE
- Born: Barnaby John Lenon; 10 May 1954 (age 72); Chelsea, London, England
- Education: Eltham College
- Alma mater: University of Oxford; University of Cambridge
- Employer(s): University of Buckingham; Independent Schools Council; Harrow School; Trinity School of John Whitgift; Highgate School; Eton College; Sherborne School; Holland Park School
- Spouse: Penelope Thain (m. 1983)
- Children: 2
- Website: www.buckingham.ac.uk/directory/barnaby-lenon

Barnaby John Lenon CBE (born 10 May 1954) is a British schoolmaster who was headmaster of Harrow School until 2011. He is currently professor and dean of education at the University of Buckingham. He was chairman of the Independent Schools Council (ISC) from 2011 to 2025 and has been a governor of 23 state and independent schools and a board member of Ofqual. From 2011 to 2012 he was vice-president of the Royal Geographical Society. In 2012 he helped establish a Free School in east London, the London Academy of Excellence, and was the chairman of governors. He was a trustee of the New Schools Network and is a trustee of Yellow Submarine (a charity which supports children and young adults with learning disabilities in Oxfordshire).

== Education ==
Lenon, the son of a clergyman, was born in Chelsea in 1954 and was educated at Eltham College, an independent school in Eltham in south London, followed by Keble College, Oxford, where he studied geography. He then went on to St John's College, Cambridge to train for a career in teaching and won the university prize for education.

== Career ==
Lenon began his career with a year at Sherborne School in Dorset, then moved on to Eton College, an independent school in Berkshire, where he taught for twelve years. He was in the state sector for a short while at Holland Park School in west London. He became deputy headmaster of Highgate School and then headmaster of the Trinity School of John Whitgift in Croydon, south London. He was appointed as headmaster of Harrow in 1999 and during his tenure the school increased in both popularity and academic results. He was appointed Chairman of the Independent Schools Council 2011-2025 to oversee lobbying, research, the press and legal advice for the 1250 schools in ISC.

Lenon is often quoted in the media about his views, complaining of what he regards as the 'dumbing down' of educational standards since the demise of O-Levels, and in early 2010 was attacked by the then Schools Minister in the Labour Government, Vernon Coaker.

=== Media appearances and publications ===
Lenon has appeared in newspapers and on the television a number of times in the past decade, mostly speaking about educational reforms. He appeared in the ITV documentary series Harrow: The School on the Hill in May 2001, on BBC 1's Celebrity Masterchef programme in August 2010, and on the BBC 2 documentary programme Britain's Youngest Boarders in September 2010. He has also appeared on BBC 2's Newsnight programme.

Lenon has published a number of successful textbooks for schools including Techniques and Fieldwork in Geography (1983), London (1988), London in the 1990s (1993), The United Kingdom (1995), Fieldwork Techniques and Projects in Geography (1996), Geography Fieldwork and Skills (2015).

In 2017 he published a review of the national education system Much Promise: successful schools in England ISBN 978-1911382232

In 2018 he published Other Peoples Children, an account of what happens to those in England's bottom 50% academically and the state of vocational education in the country.

In 2025 he published Introduction to Teaching: Making Teacher Training Work, a research-based account of the characteristics of good teaching in schools.

=== Honours and awards ===
In 2005 Tatler magazine awarded Lenon its Schools Award for Headmaster of the Year. He was appointed Commander of the Order of the British Empire (CBE) in the 2019 Birthday Honours for services to education.

== Personal life ==
Lenon married Penelope Anne Thain in 1983. The couple have two daughters: India, born in 1989, and Flora, born in 1992.
