= Trinity School of John Whitgift =

Independent school in Croydon, Greater London

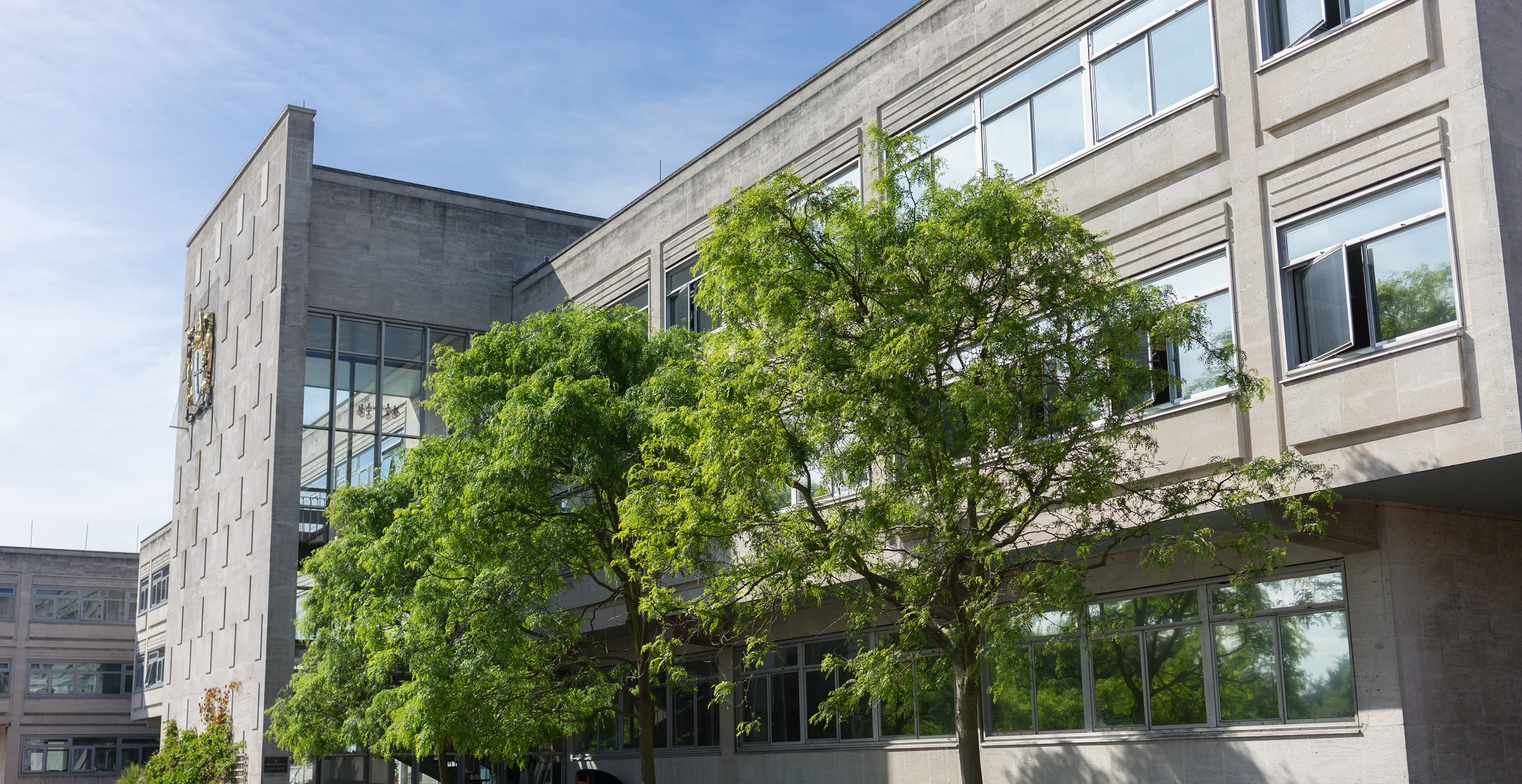
- Front view of the Trinity School of John Whitgift

Location
- Shirley, London, Greater London, CR9 7AT; England; 51.37386°N 0.05967°W

Information
- Type: Private school (from 1968); Grammar school (1945-1968)
- Motto: Vincit qui patitur ("Who perseveres, conquers")
- Established: 1882; 144 years ago
- Founder: John Whitgift
- Local authority: London Borough of Croydon
- Department for Education URN: 101842 Tables
- Chairman of the Court of Governors: C J Houlding
- Head teacher: Alasdair Kennedy
- Staff: 240
- Gender: Mixed-sex education, co-educational
- Age: 10 to 18
- Enrolment: 1048
- Colours: Yellow and Blue
- Alumni: Old Mid-Whitgiftians (OMWs)
- Website: www.trinity-school.org

The Trinity School of John Whitgift, also known as Trinity School, is a private school with a co-educational sixth form, located in Shirley, London, in London Borough of Croydon. Previously a single-sex school, in April 2025, Trinity announced it would become fully co-educational, welcoming girls into Year 6 and Year 7 (10+, 11+) in September 2027.

Part of the Whitgift Foundation, it was established in 1882 as Whitgift Middle School and was a direct grant grammar school from 1945 until 1968, when it left the scheme. The present name was adopted in 1954, to avoid confusion with Whitgift School. The school's head is now a member of the Headmasters' and Headmistresses' Conference (HMC).

The school's first home was in Church Road, central Croydon, and then from 1931 to 1965 it was at North End, Croydon, in the old premises of Whitgift School, which moved to Haling Park, South Croydon. The "romantic Gothic towers and verdant lawns" at North End, a building of historical significance, dominated the area, but in 1968 the whole edifice was torn down for redevelopment, despite public opposition. Today, the Whitgift Centre stands on the site, in a modernist contrast to the old building.

The school was built in 1965 on the site of the former Shirley Park Hotel.

== History ==
The school is part of the Whitgift Foundation, alongside Whitgift School and the Old Palace School for Girls. The Whitgift Foundation was founded in 1596 by John Whitgift, Archbishop of Canterbury. His legacy allows the School to provide facilities and a range of bursaries and scholarships.

Trinity School was founded in 1882 as Whitgift Middle School. Its original site was in Church Road in central Croydon, occupying the modest buildings of the Croydon Poor School which dated from 1858. In 1931 it moved to its second site in North End in Croydon. After years of confusion with Whitgift School, in 1954 Whitgift Middle School was renamed Trinity School of John Whitgift. However the school's Old Boys' Club was still known as the Old Mid-Whitgiftians until early 2010, when a vote was taken to change the name to the Trinity Mid-Whitgiftian Association.

The school was a direct grant grammar school from 1945 until 1968, when it left the scheme but continued to take Local education authority (LEA) funded pupils until the late 1970s.

Trinity School moved to its present and third home in Shirley in 1965, built on the site of the Shirley Park Hotel, which itself was a redevelopment of a large Georgian house called Shirley House, built in 1720, once a home of the third Earl of Eldon.

== The school today ==
Many of Trinity's students come from local schools and join aged 10 or 11, but there is also a large intake of prep school students at 10, 11 and 13+. Around 70 girls join the Sixth Form each year.

As part of its move to become fully co-education, Trinity School is expanding gradually from 1,050 students to 1,400 by 2031. This transition is being supported by a £40m investment by the John Whitgift Foundation in new facilities that benefit every student. This includes improved sports facilities, an expanded dining room, new performance space, new classrooms and a new Sixth Form Centre - all surrounded by green social spaces for students to enjoy.

A traditional curriculum is studied by all students, with optional subjects at GCSE such as Mandarin Chinese becoming more popular.

The school has a co-educational Sixth Form, a feature that was implemented in September 2011. For this change, a new state-of-the-art Sixth Form Centre was built, and opened by the Mayor of London, Boris Johnson.

Trinity has enjoyed regional and national success in its main school sports of rugby union, field hockey, cricket, and water polo, and also in other sports as diverse as swimming, athletics, and squash. The school has a climbing wall, two large astro-turf pitches and four hard tennis courts, along with pitches for rugby, cricket, soccer, and athletics, as well as the school's nearby sports field, Sandilands, and an indoor sports centre, with two large halls, several squash courts, a gymnasium, and an accompanying weights-room.

The school offers over 100 clubs and societies. The school’s music facilities include a recording suite and a dedicated choir room. Trinity became the first All Steinway School in London in 2012 and has 25 pianos, including two model D concert grand pianos and five other grand pianos.

The school has extensive musical facilities with over 25 fully-soundproof practice pods fitted with Steinway pianos, and regularly hosts both external and internal musical competitions such as the Coulsdon and Purley Festival and the Trinity Musician of the Year (TMOTY).

The Trinity School chess club has achieved great success over the years. One of its members, Laurence D. Marks, won the under-21 British championship in 1973, and its teams were in the finals of the British Schools Chess Championship in 1967, 1969, and 1972.

== Trinity Boys Choir ==
Trinity Boys Choir, led for many years by David Squibb, is well known for its musical achievements, especially through its choristers under the direction of Director of Music, David Swinson, and now Nicholas Mulroy, a professional tenor.

== Headmasters ==
The current headmaster is Alastair Kennedy, previously Deputy Master at Dulwich College, who joined the school in September 2016 on the retirement of Mark Bishop.

=== From 1882 to present ===
- 1882–1908: William Ingrams
- 1905–1919: Rev G A Jones
- 1919–1951: Horace Clayton
- 1952–1972: Oliver Berthoud
- 1972–1994: Robin Wilson
- 1995–1999: Barnaby Lenon
- 1999–2006: Christopher Tarrant
- 2006–2016: Mark Bishop
- 2016–Present: Alasdair Kennedy

== Combined Cadet Force ==
The Combined Cadet Force (CCF) at Trinity consists of the three sections (Army, RAF and RN). Pupils have the opportunity of joining the CCF in the Spring Term of the Third Form and the minimum length of service is four terms. Cadets then follow a common recruits' syllabus for two terms before choosing which of the three sections they wish to join. At the end of the Summer Term all cadets have the option to attend a UK Central Camp.

== Notable alumni ==
Former pupils of Trinity School of John Whitgift are known as Old Mid Whitgiftians.

=== Arts ===
- Andrew Barnabas, video game music composer
- John Bishop (1931-2000), publisher
- Dane Bowers, former singer from band Another Level
- Stephen Bryant, violinist, leader of the BBC Symphony Orchestra
- Ken Burton, composer and conductor
- Malcolm Douglas, illustrator
- William Gao, actor, musician
- Andrew Gowers, former editor of the Financial Times
- Stanley William Hayter, painter and print-maker
- Thomas Igloi, cellist
- E G Handel Lucas (1861-1936), artist
- Karl Lutchmayer, pianist
- Alexander Molony, actor
- Mark Porter, designer
- David Scarboro, actor
- Colin Sell, pianist
- Malcolm Sinclair, stage and television actor

=== Business ===
- Stephen Haddrill, former Director General of ABI and former CEO of the FRC
- Ian Marchant, former CEO of SSE plc, chair of Thames Water

=== Military ===
- Correlli Barnett, military historian
- John Stacey, Air Chief Marshal, Royal Air Force
- Paul Godfrey, Air Marshal, United Kingdom Space Command

=== Politics and public service ===
- Matthew D. Baggott, Chief Constable of Northern Ireland
- Gavin Barwell, Baron Barwell, Member of Parliament for Croydon Central (2010–17), Assistant Whip to the Conservative Party; Downing Street Chief of Staff (2017–19) and Lord Temporal.
- Jack Dunnett, former Member of Parliament (1964–83) for Nottingham Central and then Nottingham East
- Andrew Pelling, politician, former MP for Croydon Central (2005–2010)
- Daniel Zeichner, politician, Member of Parliament for Cambridge (2015–)

=== Science ===
- Ross John Angel, mineralogist
- Tim Broyd, civil engineer
- Ian Craib, sociologist
- Laurence D. Marks, material scientist
- Geoff Smith, mathematician
- Mike Stroud, doctor, adventurer and educator
- Nicholas Wareham, epidemiologist

=== Sports ===
- Gary Butcher, former Surrey and Glamorgan cricketer
- Mark Butcher, former England and Surrey cricketer
- George Chuter, England rugby union player
- Alex Codling, former England rugby union Player
- Lucas Friday, rugby union player
- Lewis Grabban, Nottingham Forest F.C. striker
- Sean King, Olympic Water Polo player
- Imani-Lara Lansiquot, GB sprinter, Olympic silver medalist
- Scott Newman, Surrey cricketer
- Richard Nowell, former Surrey cricketer
- Geoffrey Paish, English Davis Cup tennis star
- Kieran Roche, rugby union player
- Shane Roiser, rugby union player
- Ian Watmore, former Chief Executive, FA (The Football Association) and First Civil Service Commissioner
- Gabriel Ibitoye, England rugby union player
- Oliver Scarles, English professional footballer
- Kira Chathli, English cricketer

=== Other ===
- Jeremy Sheehy, Anglican priest and academic

== Notable ex staff members ==
- Laurie Fishlock, cricketer
- Phil Keith-Roach, forwards Rugby coach with England 2003 World Cup winners
- Barnaby Lenon, former headmaster of Harrow School
- Peter Smith, union leader
- David Squibb, director of music
- Ian Salisbury, cricketer
- Ali Brown, cricketer
