= Kieran Roche =

English rugby union player

- Born: Kieran Roche; 3 May 1979 (age 47) Portsmouth, England
- Height: 2.01 m (6 ft 7 in)
- Weight: 110 kg (17 st 5 lb)
- School: Trinity School of John Whitgift
- University: Loughborough University

Rugby union career
- Position: Flanker / Lock
- Current team: London Irish
Senior career
Years	Team	Apps	(Points)
- Rugby
- Saracens
2003 -	London Irish	95	(20)

Kieran Roche (born 3 May 1979) is a rugby union footballer who plays at lock/back row for London Irish. He was educated at Trinity School in Croydon where he started playing rugby at the age of 12.
