= Ian Craib =

English sociologist and psychotherapist

Ian Ernest Craib (12 December 1945 – 22 December 2002) was an English sociologist and psychotherapist.

He was educated at Trinity School of John Whitgift, and the South Bank Polytechnic, eventually receiving his doctorate at the Victoria University of Manchester. He went on to join the University of Essex in 1973, eventually rising to the chair of Professor of Sociology. During his time at the university, he gained an international reputation in sociology, and is widely read as a theoretician who ably links sociology and psychoanalysis.

In the mid-1980s, he received qualification as a psychotherapist and group analyst, bringing together his interests in the reciprocal effects between individuals, groups and societies. In the late 1980s he was central — along with Karl Figlio, Joan Busfield, Ken Plummer and John Walshe — to the creation of a master's degree in Sociology and Psychotherapy, organised jointly by the University of Essex and the Mental Health Trust. This was one of the first university courses of its type in the country, combining clinical experience with theoretical thinking.

Craib's working-class origins influenced his understanding of class systems and the politics of power, and this partly explains his attachment in his late teens to Trotskyist parties. He later rejected them, however, because of their authoritarianism. Unfair treatment and unequal distribution of power and influence angered him. In the psychoanalytic field he encouraged the sharing of the difficulties, pain, joy and fun of group psychotherapeutic work. The need to get things right, the wonder at how interpretations were so often lost and ignored, the question of whether one should be working with the deep unconscious in therapeutic groups or making comments at the overt conscious level were constant themes that he brought to discussions.

He died of cancer on 22 December 2002, at the age of 57.

== Bibliography ==
- Existentialism and Sociology — a Study of Jean-Paul Sartre, Cambridge University Press, 1976
- Modern Social Theory – from Parsons to Habermas, Harvester-Wheatsheaf, London, 1984 ISBN 0-7108-0183-1
- Psychoanalysis and Social Theory: The Limits of Sociology, Harvester Wheatsheaf, 1989
- Modern Social Theory: from Parsons to Habermas, Harlow: Pearson, 1992
- Anthony Giddens, Routledge, 1992
- The Importance of Disappointment, Routledge, 1994
- Classical Social Theory, Oxford, 1997
- Experiencing Identity, Sage, 1998
