= Alberni Quartet =

British string quartet

The Alberni Quartet is a British string quartet, whose members have included:

- 1st violin Dennis Simons, then Howard Davis, currently Karin Leishman
- 2nd violin Howard Davis, then John Knight, then Peter Pople, currently Victoria Sayles
- Viola John White, then Berian Evans, then Roger Best, currently Matthew Souter
- Cello Gregory Baron, then David Smith, currently Richard May

The quartet was founded in 1962 by four students of the Royal Academy of Music (Dennis Simons, Howard Davis, John White, and Gregory Baron). It was initially named the Simons Quartet, after its first violinist, and later renamed Alberni (the name of Dennis Simons' birthplace in Canada). From 1968 Davis became the 1st violinist, with Peter Pople, Roger Best, and David Smith. They were based in Harlow, Essex where they became established in the 1960s as the town's "quartet in residence", and by the mid-1970s had become world-renowned. Their debut in the Carnegie Hall was well received in The New York Times, and they received positive reviews of their recordings of Schumann's piano quintet, Schubert's string quintet and Brahms' string sextets numbers one and two.

As well as performing a wide range of the classical string quartet repertoire from Haydn and Mozart to Bartók and Benjamin Britten, they performed new works written for them, including Richard Stoker's first string quartet at the Buxton Festival in February 1962 and again at the SPNM, 4 St James's Square, London, in March 1963, Alan Rawsthorne's third string quartet written for the 1965 Harlow Music Festival, and Nicholas Maw's first string quartet.

Benjamin Britten coached them in his own first and second string quartets (they have recorded all three of his works in the genre), and entrusted the first British performances of Dmitri Shostakovich's ninth and tenth quartets (whose scores he had acquired from the composer) to them.

The Alberni were the first Western quartet to visit China (1987).

They were the resident quartet at the Royal Scottish Academy of Music and Drama from 1981 to 1988.

In 1993, at the Presteigne Festival, the quartet gave the first complete performance of Adrian Williams' Third String Quartet.

The Alberni Quartet are now based in South-West England, and have been Quartet-in-Residence at Cedars Hall, Wells, and Artists-in-Residence at the 2018 Two Moors Festival.
