= Surrey Street Pumping Station, Croydon =

Water pumping station in Croydon, London, England

Coordinates: 51.3721°N 0.1020°W

Location of Surrey Street Pumping Station

Surrey Street Pumping Station is a Grade II listed pumphouse in Croydon, South London, England, that was built in four phases. It is the site of a well that "had been more or less public ever since the town existed". It was opened by the Archbishop of Canterbury on 11 December 1851, making Croydon one of the first towns (Note: Tottenham was probably the first The Globe 28 November 1851 issue 16658 page 2 "From a correspondent") to have a combined water and sewage system under the Public Health Act 1848 (11 & 12 Vict. c. 63), and to Chadwick’s arterial-venous design. The water was pumped from the wells, up Park Hill to a cylindrical brick reservoir with a domed roof to provide a constant supply of fresh piped water. Prior to its opening, the inhabitants of Croydon used the river Wandle, streams and shallow wells, which were often contaminated by seepage from privies and cesspools. Parts of Norwood were served with water from the Lambeth Waterworks Company, a private company established by the Lambeth Waterworks Act 1785 (25 Geo. 3. c. 89).

Soon after it opened, the pumping station was involved in a landmark legal case about the abstraction of water from wells. The opening coincided with a reduction of water in the river Wandle that had been predicted by the river's millers. They believed they had a strong case under riparian law that they should not be harmed by the abstraction. The Lords disagreed and determined on 27 July 1859 that "the course and direction of underground waters were considered too uncertain and too little known, to be the foundation of any (riparian) rights in them". Water levels in the river subsequently increased, suggesting the reason for the low levels in the river was a lack of rainfall. It is somewhat ironic that in 1912 Croydon objected to the abstraction of water at Purley by the East Surrey Water company for fear it would damage their supply.

== Phase 1 (1851) ==
The original 1851 engine house is in the northwest corner furthest from Surrey Street in brown brick and bears the date 1851 on its west elevation. The well was enlarged to a depth of 77 feet (23 m) by Thomas Docwra and son. Its diameter decreased in steps from 9 feet (2.7 m) at the top to just 1 foot (0.3 m) at the bottom. The engine house was built on a tall brick plinth over the well to house a pair of 24HP Cornish beam engines from Sandys, Vivian and Co. of Hayle. It was rebuilt by the local builder William Harris using material from the atmospheric railway engine house at Croydon, which the Local Board of Health had purchased from the London, Brighton and South Coast railway company for £250. The Surrey Street pumping house was necessarily taller to house the engines with their 9’ (2.7m) piston stroke and plunger. The doors and windows were also different to ease ingress and egress, and maintain aesthetic proportions. There is at least a nod to the railway's engine house on the north elevation, with a similar Tudor style and roofline gable and dormer. The boiler house and chimney have not survived. To protect the engines, the installer Samuel Hocking invented the weighted balance valve. If the mains riser broke, the valve would close and the engines would work against the weight to maintain a constant load and prevent the engines from speeding up and breaking. The engines could raise 40 gallons with each stroke and by April 1853, less than 18 months after opening, both engines raised over 450,000 gallons daily to supply water to 1,900 homes. Before the end of 1866, the engines were pumping up to 1.5M gallons daily. The engines were powered by steam from three boilers that by June 1867 were in such a dangerous state they could not be used and subsequently shared new boilers installed for the second phase. By about 1876 the engines were used as backup / standby and had certainly stopped pumping by 1894.

Water supply was limited to households lower than the reservoir and higher than the sewage irrigation field (near today’s Sainsbury supermarket on the Purley Way), known as a special district. Households within the special district paid higher rates to recover the cost of the works.

== Phase 2 (1867) ==
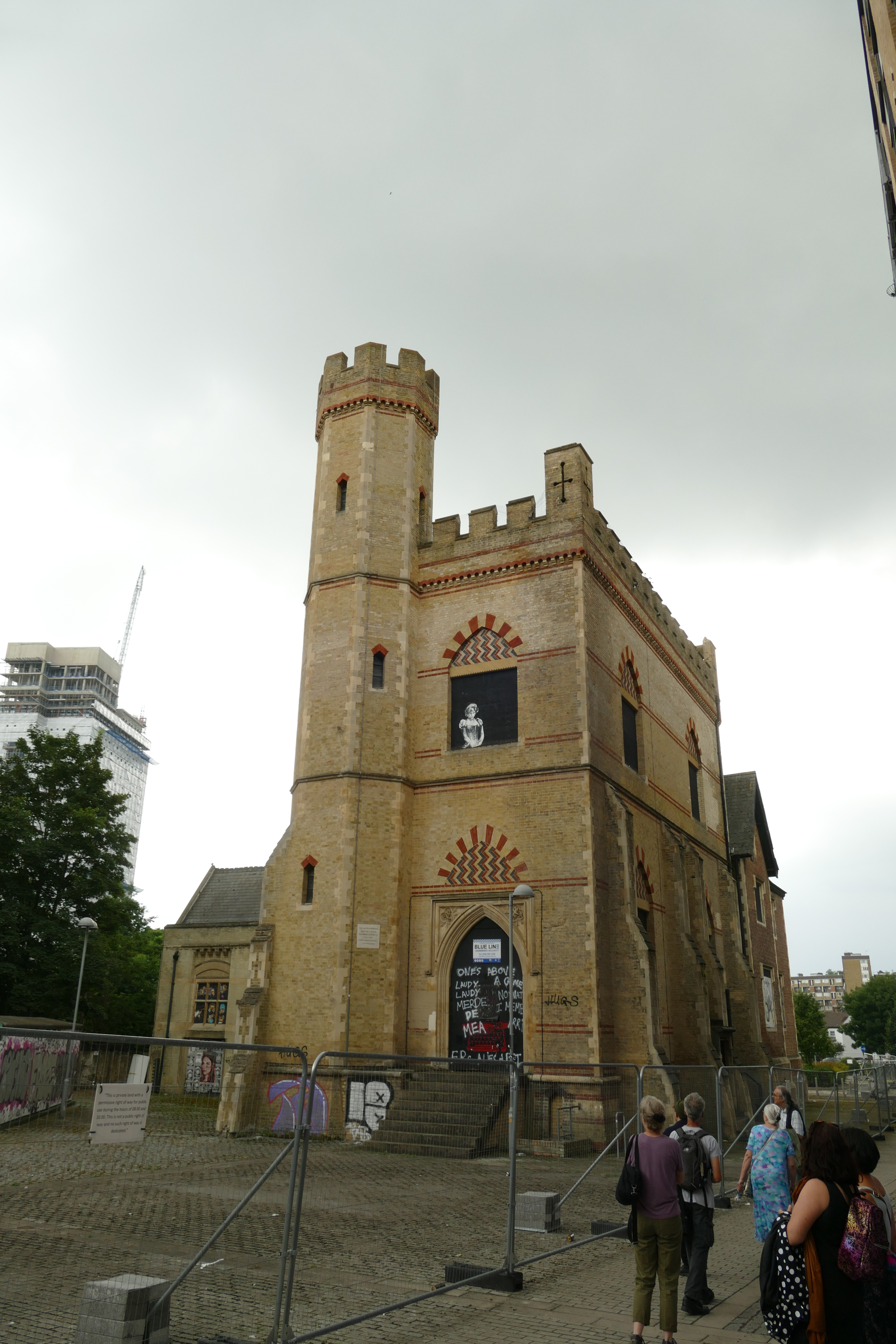
Latham's 1867 engine house

The 1867 castellated, gothic-style engine house closest to Surrey St is at the east end of the 1851 structure, built in white brick with polychrome brick highlights. Its detail is studied from Ely cathedral and has a hexagonal turret on the southeast corner. The architect was Baldwin Latham, who had worked and met his wife in Ely before being appointed the board’s engineer and surveyor at the end of 1863. It was built over a well or wells again bored by Thomas Docwra and son in 1864/5 to a depth of 150’(46m). The first attempt silted up 50’(15m) and had to be re-bored, which again silted up. The borehole had hit a fault or fissure in the chalk that explained the large flow of water into the wells, but which brought debris with it. The well was just 56’(17m) east of the original well. It was double lined with cast iron cylinders and the gap between the two filled with concrete. This was to reduce seepage of surface water through the gravel topsoil that might contaminate the well. The internal diameter of the well again reduced in steps from 7’6"(2.3m) at the top to 2’(0.6m) at the bottom.

It wasn’t until 20 January 1866 that the board sought authorisation from the Home Secretary to borrow £23,000 for the works. This was soon granted, after an examination of the planned work by the superintending inspector Robert Morgan. The new engine house was nearly complete by September 1866, ready to house a 120HP Cornish beam engine from the Kirkstall Forge Company of Leeds. The engine had a piston stroke of 10’ 6"(3.2m), necessitating Latham’s gothic tower to be taller than the 1851 engine house. The 38’(11.6m) beam was made by the Sheffield company, John Brown & Co. The engine was powered by steam from three Cornish boilers, each 5’6"(1.7m) in diameter and 25’(7.6m) long with a 3’(0.9m) flue.

Unfortunately, the engine was late, and by June 1866 demand outstripped supply. Water was restricted to certain daylight hours so the reservoir could refill sufficiently to reach households in the higher parts of town. Despite the restrictions, the daily consumption was 36 gallons per head, 11 gallons more than the national average. On 5 January 1867 the church (Croydon Minster) caught fire, but the fire brigade had no water because it was turned off for the night. By the time it was turned on it was too late to save the church. The works were likely completed in the second half of 1867, and certainly by February 1868.

One of the reasons for the extension was to supply water to the whole parish. A water tower was built adjacent to the Park Hill reservoir so that the highest households could be supplied with water. Regardless, the extension was required to meet the demands of the town’s population that had grown by nearly 50% from 1851 to 1861, and to meet the higher than anticipated consumption.

It was discovered that the Surrey Street wells could not reliably supply more than about 2.5M gallons daily. This could be provided by the Kirkstall engine running at its maximum speed of 12 or 13 strokes per minute and by 1876 the older engines from Hayle were used for standby / backup.

== Phase 3 (1877) ==
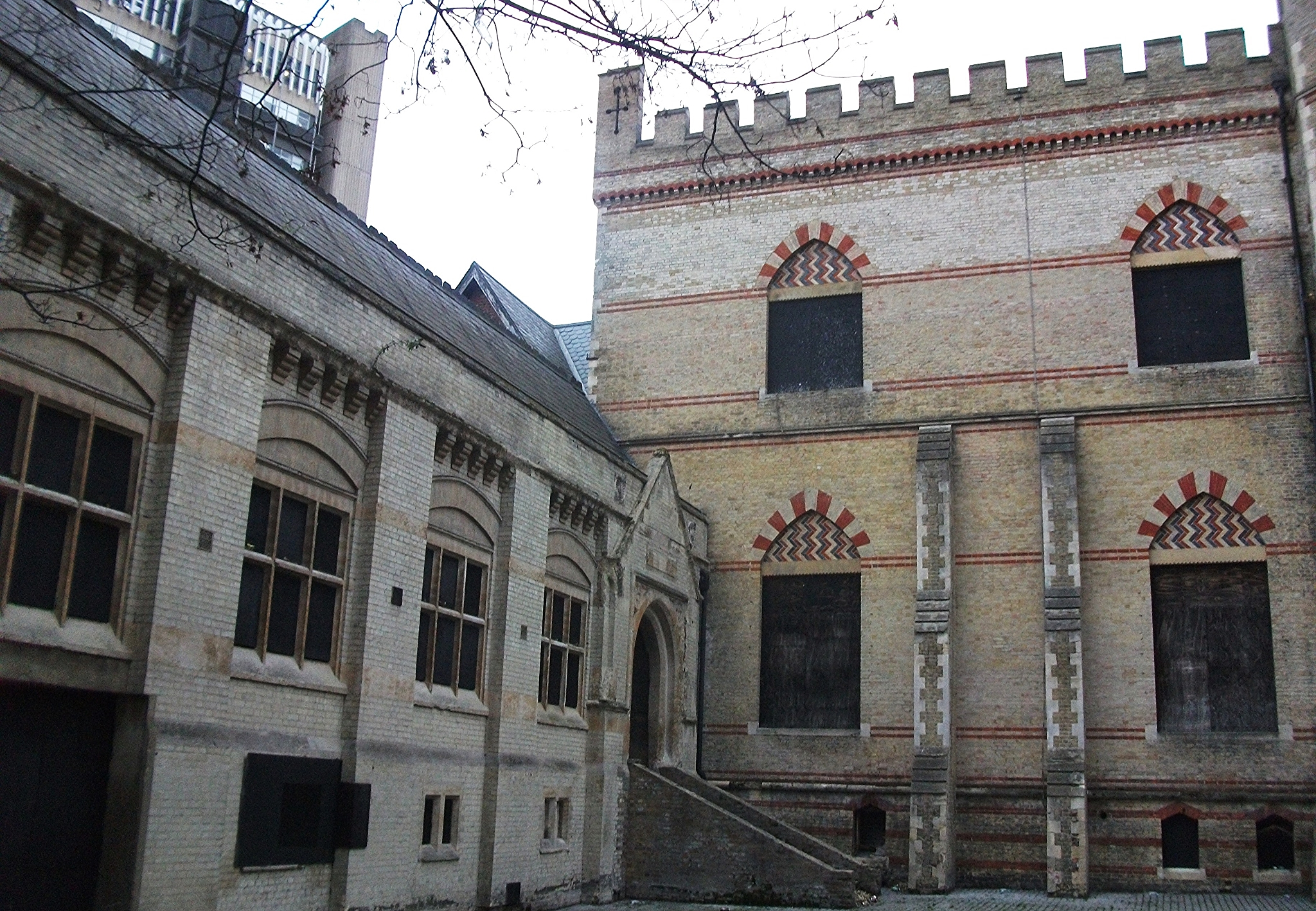
Walker's 1877 engine house (left)

The third engine house was built in 1877 on the south side and perpendicular to the 1851 and 1867 engine houses. It was not as tall as the earlier buildings because it housed a horizontal Davey compound differential engine, rather than a Cornish beam engine. The white brick engine house was designed by Thomas Walker, (Note: Thomas Walker was the father of the mathematician and physicist Gilbert Thomas Walker) who had been recruited as the board’s surveyor in 1871. Latham was in demand for his consultation and remained the board’s consulting engineer until his resignation in June 1872. (Note: Latham probably resigned over a disagreement about royalty payments on his sewage extractor Sutton Journal 16th January 1873 page 3 "Mr Latham and the Croydon Board of Health") From 1874 Latham was an active member of the Croydon Local Board of Health.

Croydon’s population had again increased by 50% to 60,000+ in the decade 1861 to 1871 and a larger water supply was required. It was hoped that a deeper well could supply more water, and a 214’(65.4m) well was bored in 1876/7 by Docwra, which was also lined. Latham was sceptical, but he was also concerned about surface water contaminating the wells and recommended the new well be dug elsewhere. The new well increased supply to something under 3M gallons daily and could be pumped solely by the new 150HP Davey compound differential engine, which at 12 strokes per minute could pump 3,200 gallons every minute. Cast iron pipes interconnected the wells, so the engine could pump water from any or all of the wells. It was mounted on a large stone and concrete block and was made by Hathorn, Davey and Campbell at the Sun Foundry in Leeds in 1876. With the Kirkstall engine, the risk of the parish being without water from an engine failure was reduced. The engine was probably powered with steam from three additional wrought iron Cornish boilers.

== Phase 4 (1912) ==
In 1911 Croydon Corporation, which had superseded the local board of health, was considering a new reservoir on Russell Hill at the south end of today’s Purley Way playing fields. This required new boilers and enhancements to the engines to pump the water to the higher level. The contract for two Lancashire boilers was won by the Tetlow Brothers of Oldham and were likely housed in a new boiler house built by James Smith and Sons of Norwood. Other alterations included a store and plumber’s shop, which may have been on the site of the old boiler house following the sale and removal of the six old wrought iron Cornish boilers.

Little is known of the white brick building with red brick decoration in the southwest corner, except the date 1912 on its western elevation. It was likely designed by George F. Carter, the Corporation’s engineer and surveyor. Ordnance Survey maps show it was built on the site of earlier buildings, while a 1939 photograph hint it was the store. (Note: Original glass plates held in London Metropolitan Archives reference ACC/2558/MW/GP/02/133/008) Although other wells had been dug in Addington, Stroud Green (Note: The area near today's Oasis Academy) and Waddon, Surrey Street remained the single most important source of water for Croydon. The capacity of these wells and Croydon’s growing population meant that water from outside the borough was required. These attempts were rebuffed and in 1939 Croydon was obliged to outsource its supply to the Metropolitan Water Board, which had earlier incorporated Lambeth Waterworks Company.

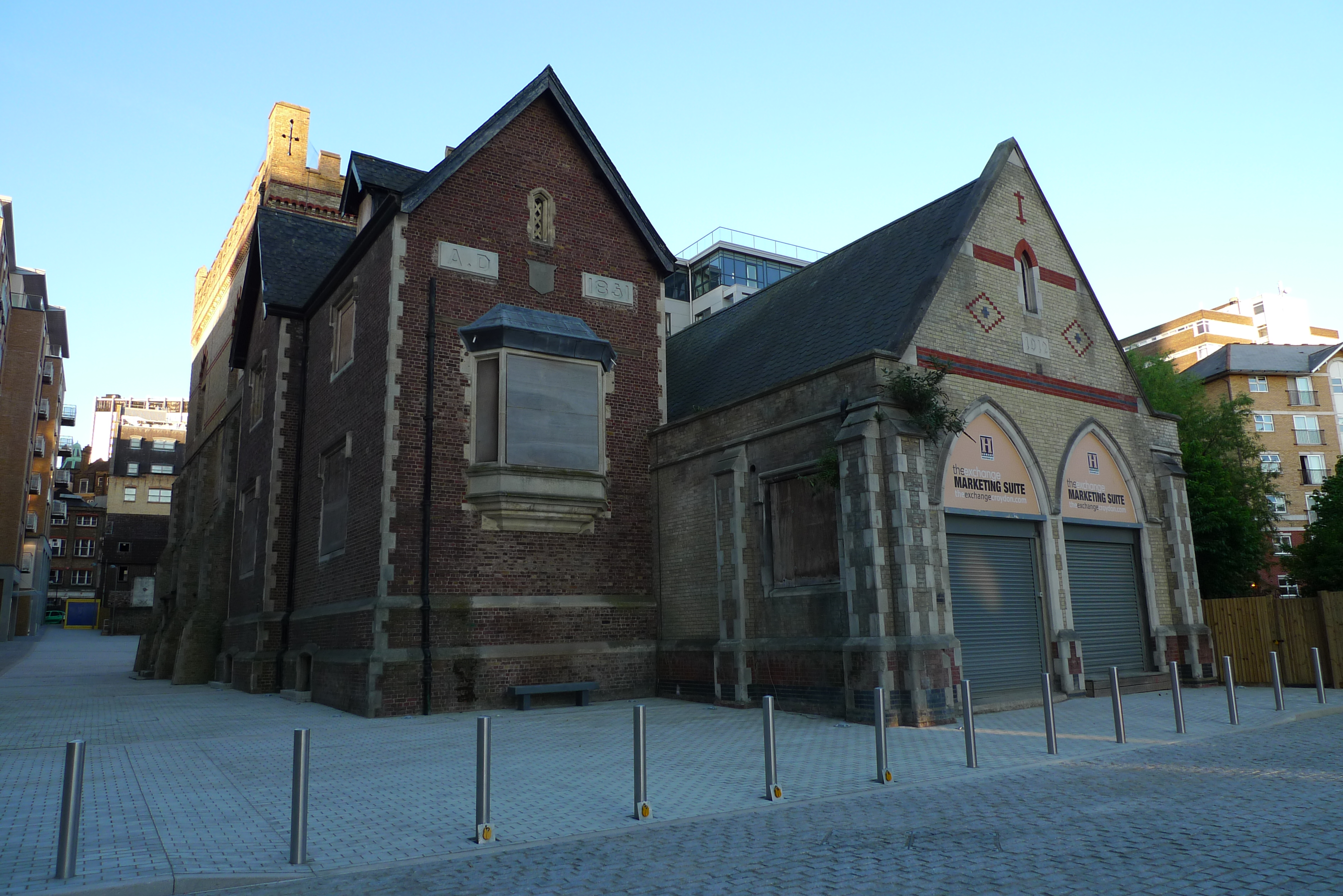
1851 (left) and 1921(right) buildings

Following another reorganisation this became Thames Water Authority on 1 April 1974 and Thames Water after the 1989 privatisation. In 1955 the Surrey Street steam engines were replaced with electric motors. Water continued to be abstracted from the wells in the last quarter of the 20th century and the site used as a store and depot. Thames water left the site around 1991, which was subsequently sold. The surrounding buildings were demolished and rebuilt as today’s Exchange Square.
