= David Squibb =

British conductor

David Squibb (28 November 1935 – 21 April 2010) was Director of Music at Trinity School of John Whitgift. He is most known for founding Trinity School Boys Choir, one of the busiest and most successful school choirs in the world. It has a high professional profile, both in the UK and abroad. Members have appeared at Glyndebourne, the Royal Opera House, Covent Garden, English National Opera and many opera houses abroad, including the Aix-en-Provence Festival, the Opera Comique, Paris, and La Fenice, Venice. The choir is well known for its part in Britten's A Midsummer Night's Dream in which they have appeared in over one hundred and fifty professional performances, and they feature in the Warner DVD and Virgin Classics CD.

Squibb joined Trinity School as Director of Music in 1964, and over the years that he taught and worked at the school he developed the choir to its position of being in demand for film and television work as well as concert appearances. He was succeeded in his post at Trinity Boys School by David Swinson.

Squibb was born in Surrey and educated at Collingwood School, Wallington, and at Whitgift School, Croydon. Subsequently, he was a piano scholar at the Royal Academy of Music, after which he did his national service in the Royal Marines and became the youngest Professor of Piano at the Royal Marines School of Music. He also worked as a freelance journalist including presenting radio programmes for the BBC.

His wife Shirley died in 2002. Shirley was an Associate of the Royal Academy of Music as a soprano. Her contribution to the success of Trinity Boys Choir has been largely unacknowledged.

Squibb died of cancer, aged 74, on 21 April 2010. He and Shirley were survived by three sons Nick, Tom and Ed.
