= Roger Best (musician) =

British violist (1936 - 2013)

- Born: Roger Best; 28 September 1936; Liverpool, England
- Died: 8 October 2013 (aged 77) London, England
- Genres: Classical
- Occupations: Musician, professor
- Instrument: Viola
- Formerly of: Northern Sinfonia, Alberni String Quartet

Roger Best, HonRCM (28 September 1936 – 8 October 2013) was a British violist. He was principal violist of the Northern Sinfonia Orchestra and a member of the Alberni String Quartet.

In 1952 he won an open scholarship to the Royal Manchester College of Music to study the viola with Paul Cropper. Whilst there he won the Hiles Gold Medal (1958). In 1960 Best was awarded a Barber Trust Scholarship from the University of Birmingham.

In 1958 he was invited to join the Hallé Orchestra by Sir John Barbirolli and played with them at the 64th season of the Proms in the summer of that year.

In 1961 he took up the principal viola position with the Northern Sinfonia Orchestra.

The Northern Sinfonia commissioned two concertos for him – from Sir Malcolm Arnold (Viola Concerto 0p.108, 1971) and Sir Richard Rodney Bennett, (Viola Concerto, 1973). He recorded the Arnold concerto in 1971, with the composer conducting. Bennett's Viola Concerto received its first performance on 3 July 1973 at the York Festival with Best as soloist, with the Northern Sinfonia Orchestra conducted by Rudolf Schwarz.

His fellow Liverpudlian and fellow student at the RMCM, John McCabe wrote his Concerto Funèbre for Viola and Chamber Orchestra (1962) for Best, but Best never performed the work.The first performance was given by James Durrant.

He became viola professor at the Royal College of Music in 1973 and taught there for over twenty-five years. He also held professorships at the Royal Academy of Music and the Royal Scottish Academy of Music and Drama.

In 1977 he joined the Alberni String Quartet and played with them for twenty years before retiring in 1997. In May 1977 he performed the Malcolm Arnold Viola Concerto at the Queen Elizabeth Hall with the composer conducting the London Mozart Players.

He made numerous recordings with the Alberni Quartet and as a soloist, recording Benjamin Britten’s Lachrymae for Viola and String Orchestra and Ralph Vaughan Williams’s Flos Campi with the English String Orchestra.

He played on a Maggini viola (c.1600) once owned by the legendary violist, Lionel Tertis.

He died aged 77 in 2013 after a long illness.
