= Whitgift Centre =

Shopping centre in Croydon, England

Coordinates: 51°22′33″N 0°06′02″W

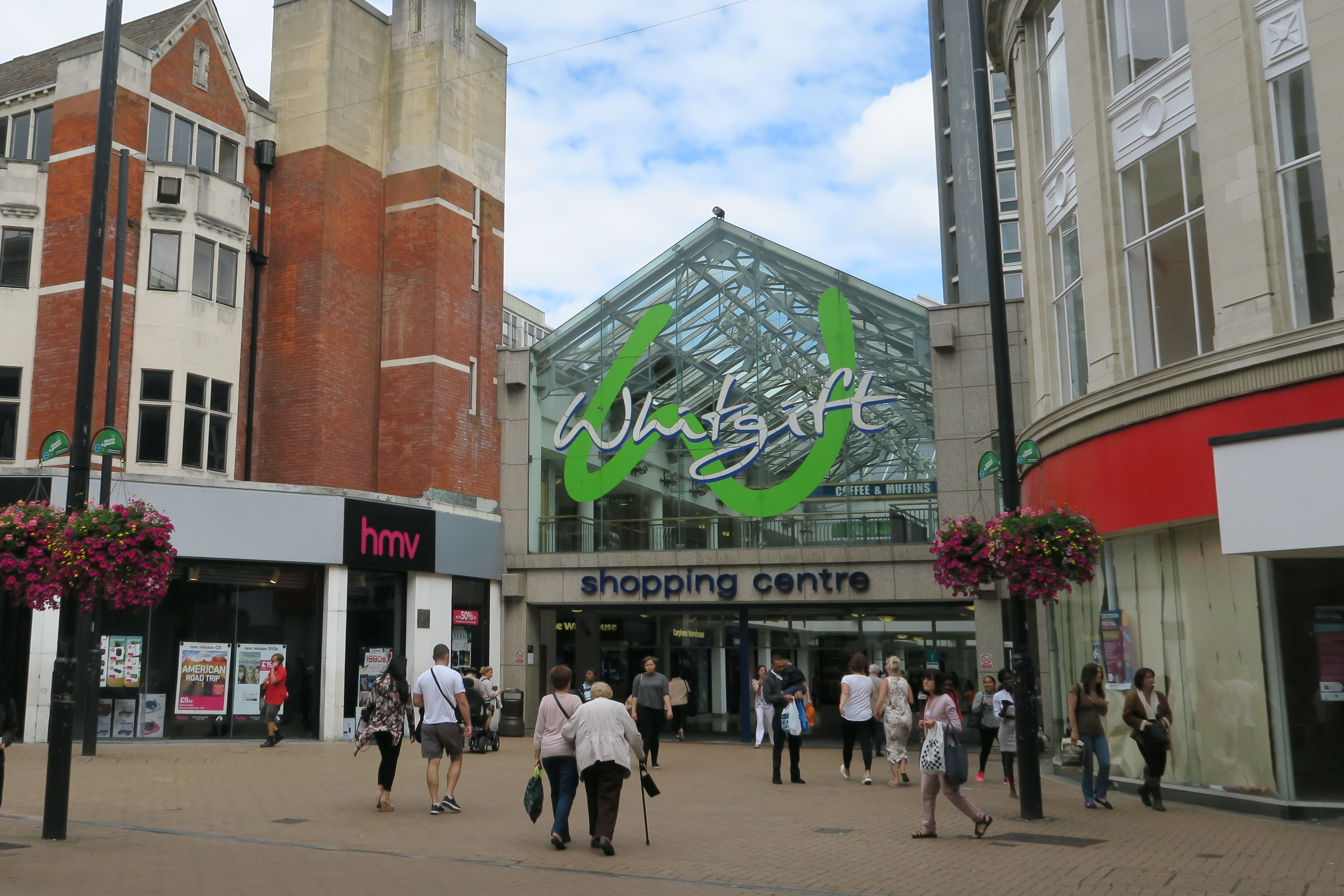
- Main entrance to Whitgift Centre from North End, Croydon
- Interactive map of the Whitgift Centre area

General information
- Type: Shopping centre/Offices and Car park
- Location: Croydon, England
- Current tenants: Boots, Holland & Barrett, New Look, River Island, Pollock's Toy Museum
- Inaugurated: October 1970; 55 years ago
- Owner: Unibail-Rodamco-Westfield (since 2023)
- Landlord: The Croydon Partnership (Unibail-Rodamco-Westfield)

Technical details
- Floor count: 3
- Floor area: 1,300,000 square feet (120,000 m^{2})

Design and construction
- Architect: Anthony Minoprio
- Architecture firm: Geddes Architects
- Main contractor: Fitzroy Robinson & Partners

The Whitgift Centre is a large shopping centre in the town centre of Croydon, opening in stages between 1968 and 1970. This centre comprises 1,302,444 sq ft (121,001 m^{2}) of retail space, and was the largest covered shopping development in Greater London until the opening of Westfield London at White City in 2008. The Whitgift Centre has a monthly footfall of 2.08 million. Its complex includes an office development.

The shopping centre has been synonymous with Croydon since its opening. In 2013, Hammerson and the Westfield Group formed a joint venture to redevelop the shopping mall and combine it with neighbouring Centrale. After years of delays, work was expected to begin in 2020, although the future of the project was under review in February 2019 due to concerns over Brexit and structural changes on the high street.

The shopping centre is managed by Hammerson Leasing. In 2023 Unibail-Rodamco-Westfield acquired full ownership of the Whitgift Centre, along with the nearby Centrale centre.

== Background ==
The name of the centre comes from John Whitgift, a former archbishop of Canterbury who is buried nearby in Croydon Minster. The Centre's Land freehold is owned by the Whitgift Foundation, a charity registered in England and Wales. The Foundation sold a long-term lease to a company 75% owned and controlled by Howard Holdings plc, and 25% by the Foundation. Designed by Geddes Architects, the centre was built after the demolition of the historic buildings of Whitgift School, which had more recently been occupied from 1931 to 1965 by Whitgift Middle School, known from 1954 as the Trinity School of John Whitgift, both schools having subsequently moved away to new sites.

== History ==
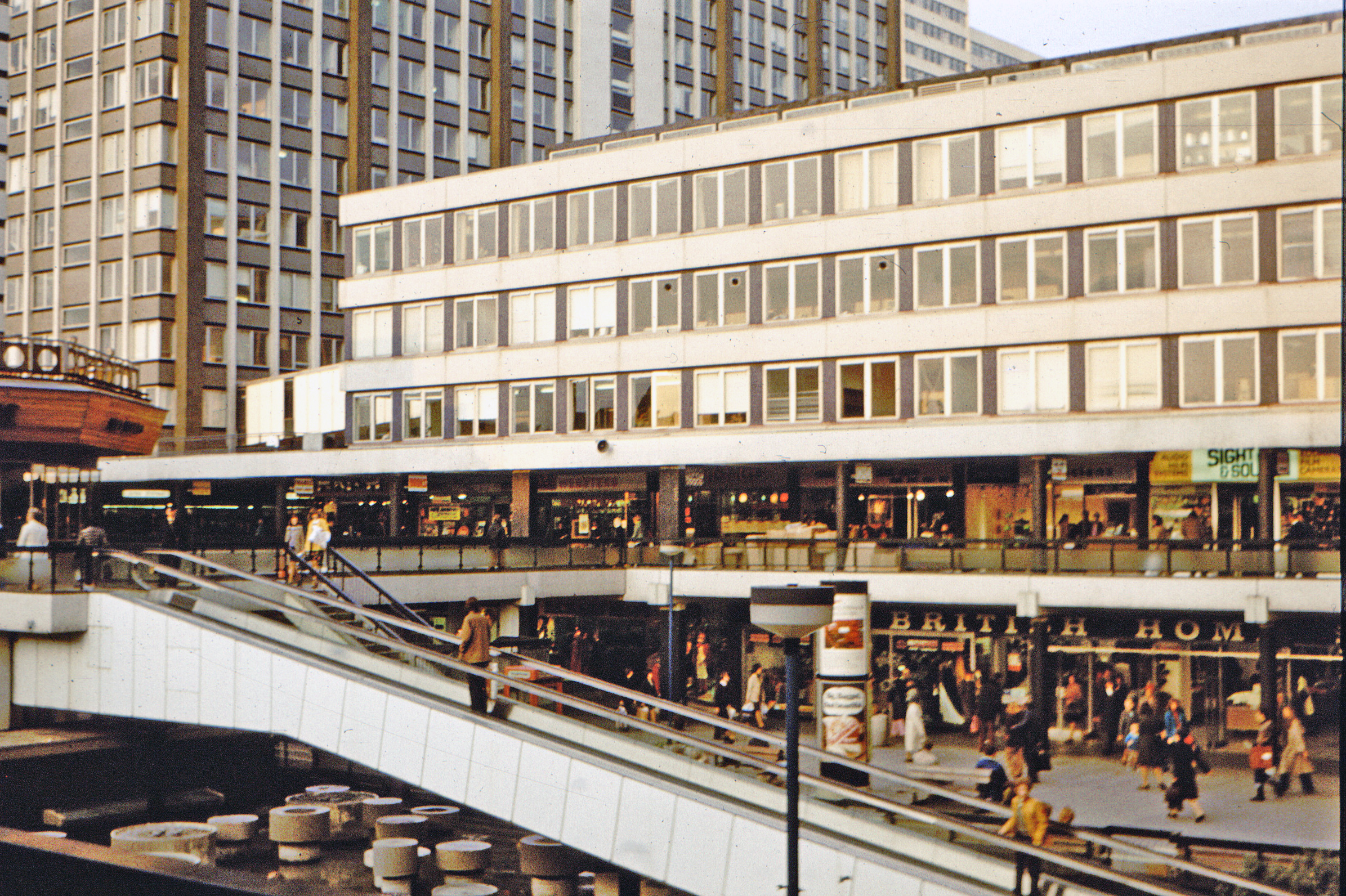
1976 view of the Whitgift Centre

The centre was designed by Anthony Minoprio and built between 1965 and 1970 by Fitzroy Robinson & Partners. Commenting in 1971, architectural historians Ian Nairn and Nikolaus Pevsner stated that "most of the architectural details are banal, but the centre functions unusually well as a shopping precinct".

In the first two decades of its existence, the Whitgift Centre had no roof and was open to the elements.

The first shop to open was Boots on 17 October 1968, and the centre itself was officially opened in October 1970 by the Duchess of Kent. In the middle of the Whitgift Centre there was a Roman-themed pub called The Forum.

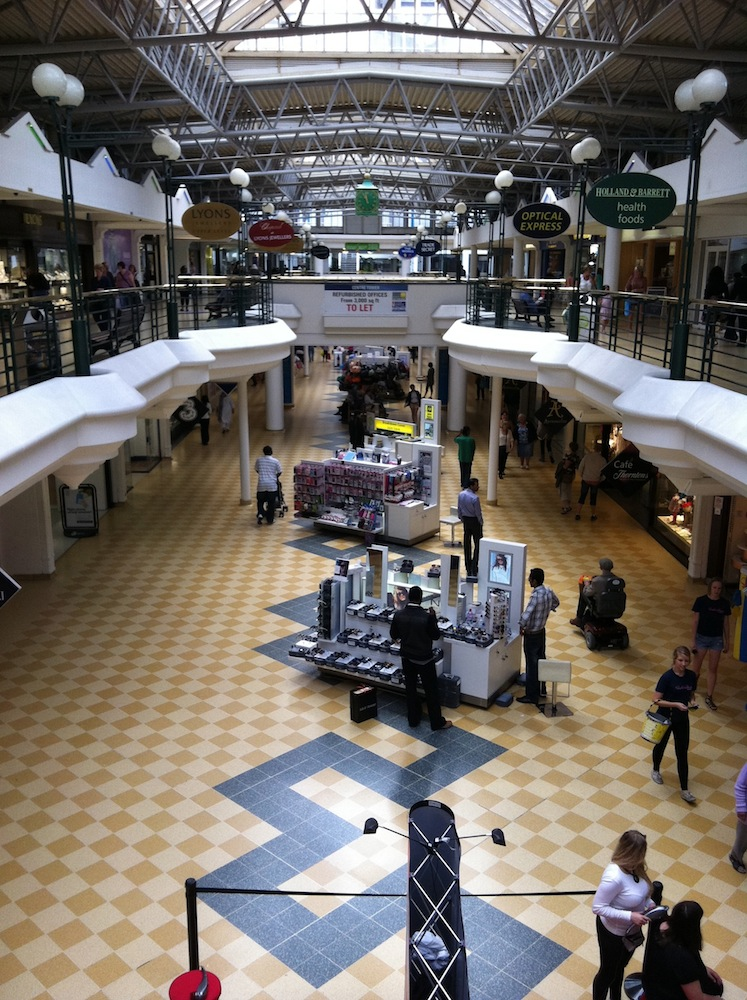
Whitgift Centre interior in 2011, after its atrium redesign

In the 1990s, the centre was almost completely rebuilt to an atrium design, and the Forum pub was demolished.

Some businesses of the former Croydon Village Outlet, based at the former Allders site, moved into Whitgift after the Outlet was taken over by Croydon Council in 2019.

By October 2025 the centre had more than 70 empty units standing, up from 52 in June and 46 in September 2024. This means that there were more units closed than open.

In November 2025, filming of the music video for the song "Opalite" took place in this mall.

== Structure ==
The shopping centre is on three storeys. The upper two are for retail, and the basement provides vehicle access to all the retail units, with a 1 kilometre (0.6 mi) network of service roads.

The Centre adjoins the now closed Allders department store, which has substantial frontage onto the Centre. The office accommodation consists of five tower blocks rising above the shopping centre.

The other major shopping centre in central Croydon is Centrale, owned by Hammerson, on the other side of the street named North End. Both centres are jointly marketed.

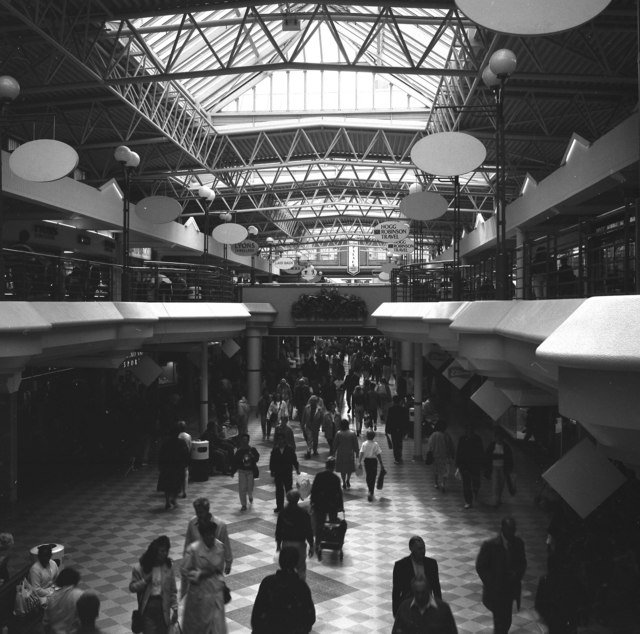
The redeveloped Whitgift Centre in 1990

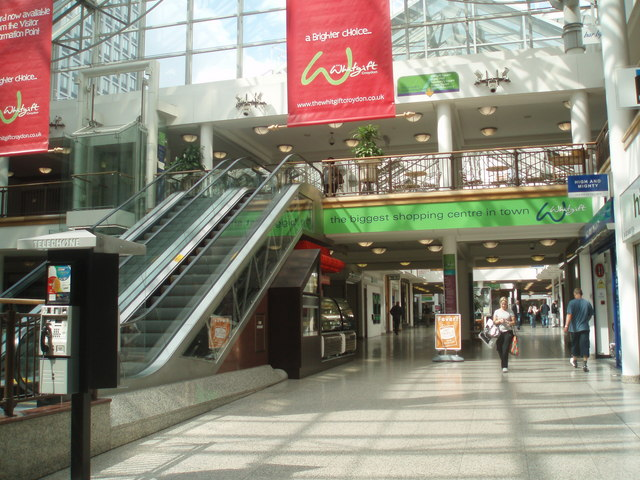
Interior of Whitgift Centre from the Wellesley Road entrance

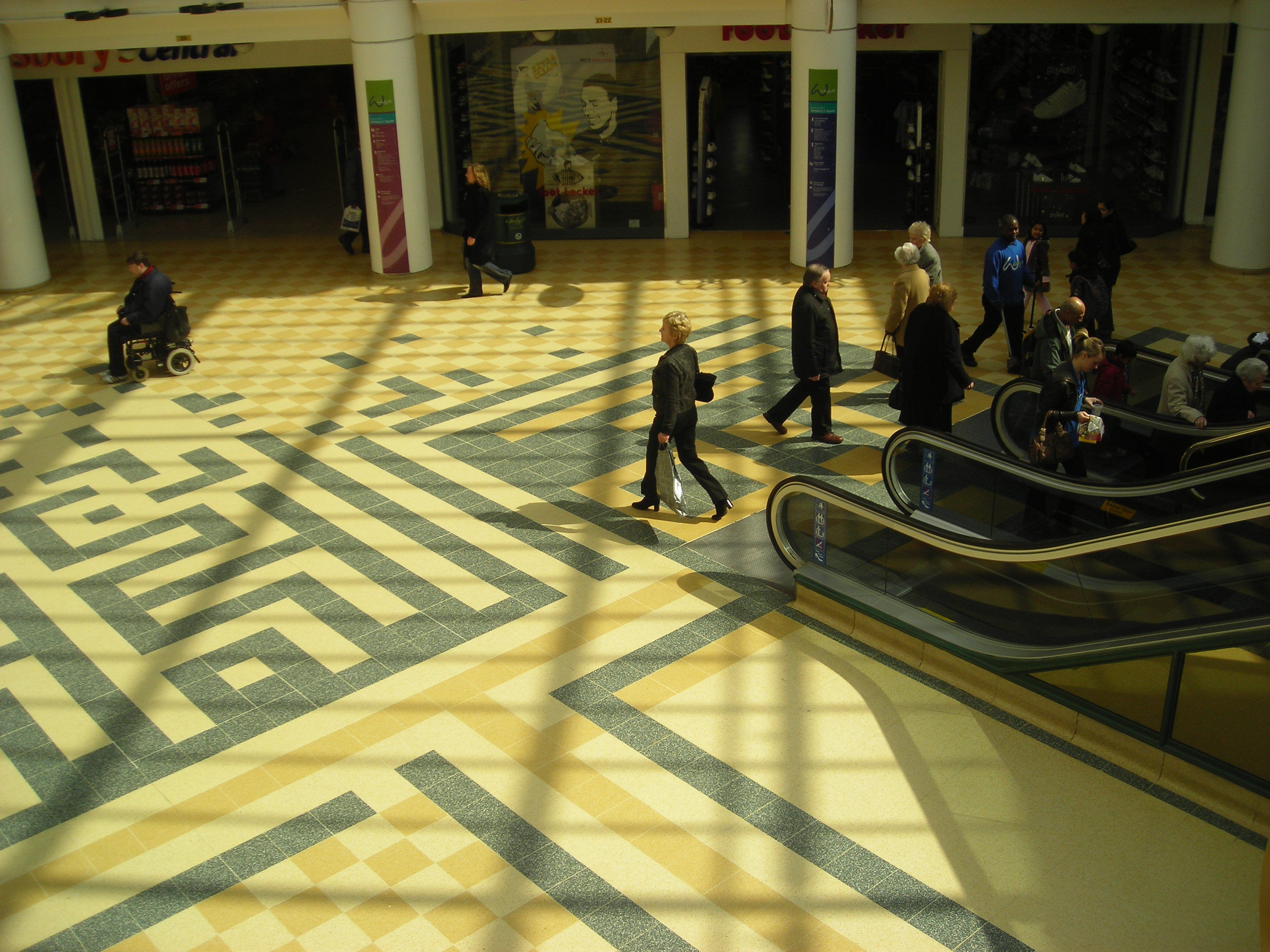
Sainsbury's Square

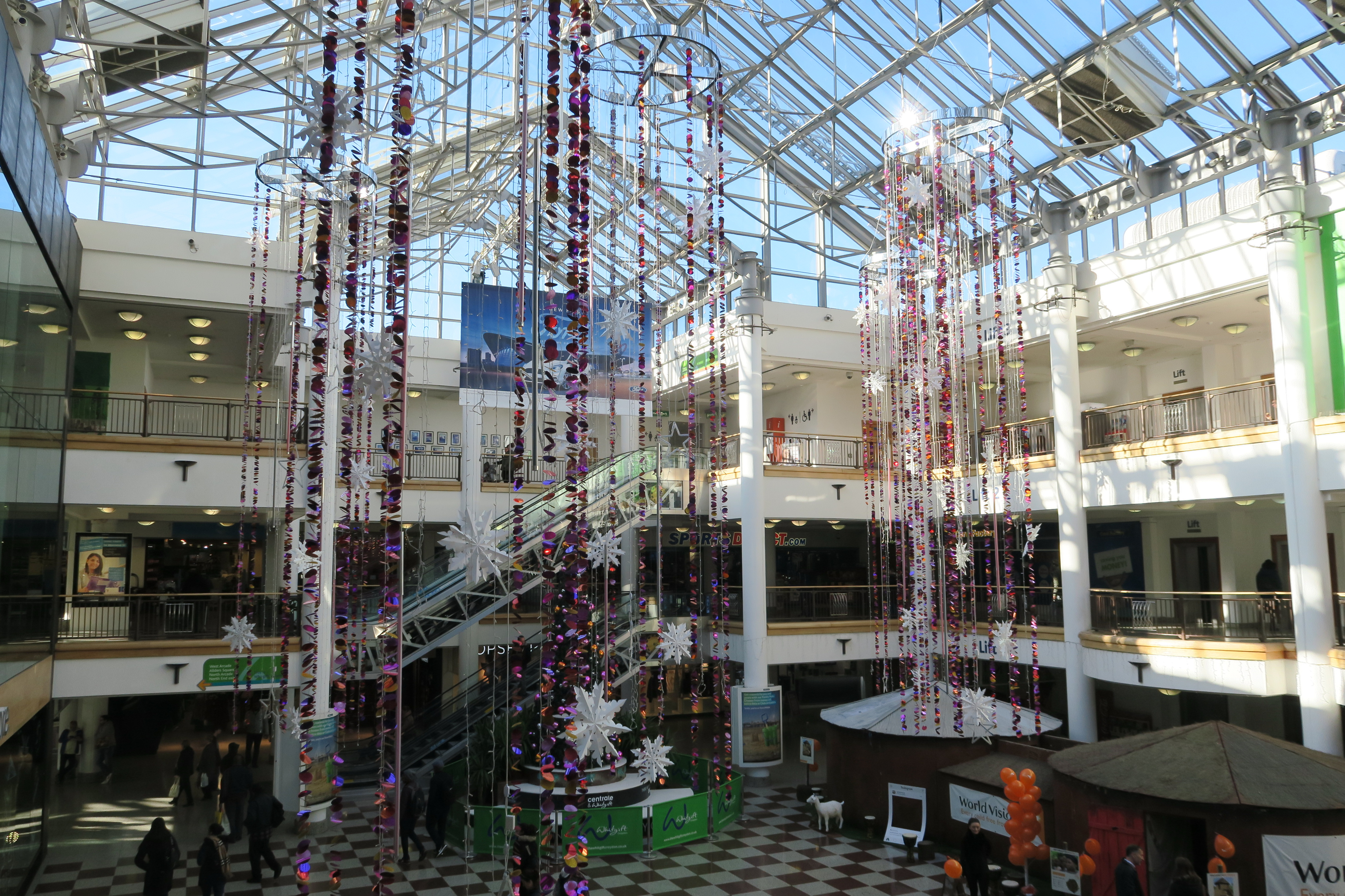
Whitgift Square

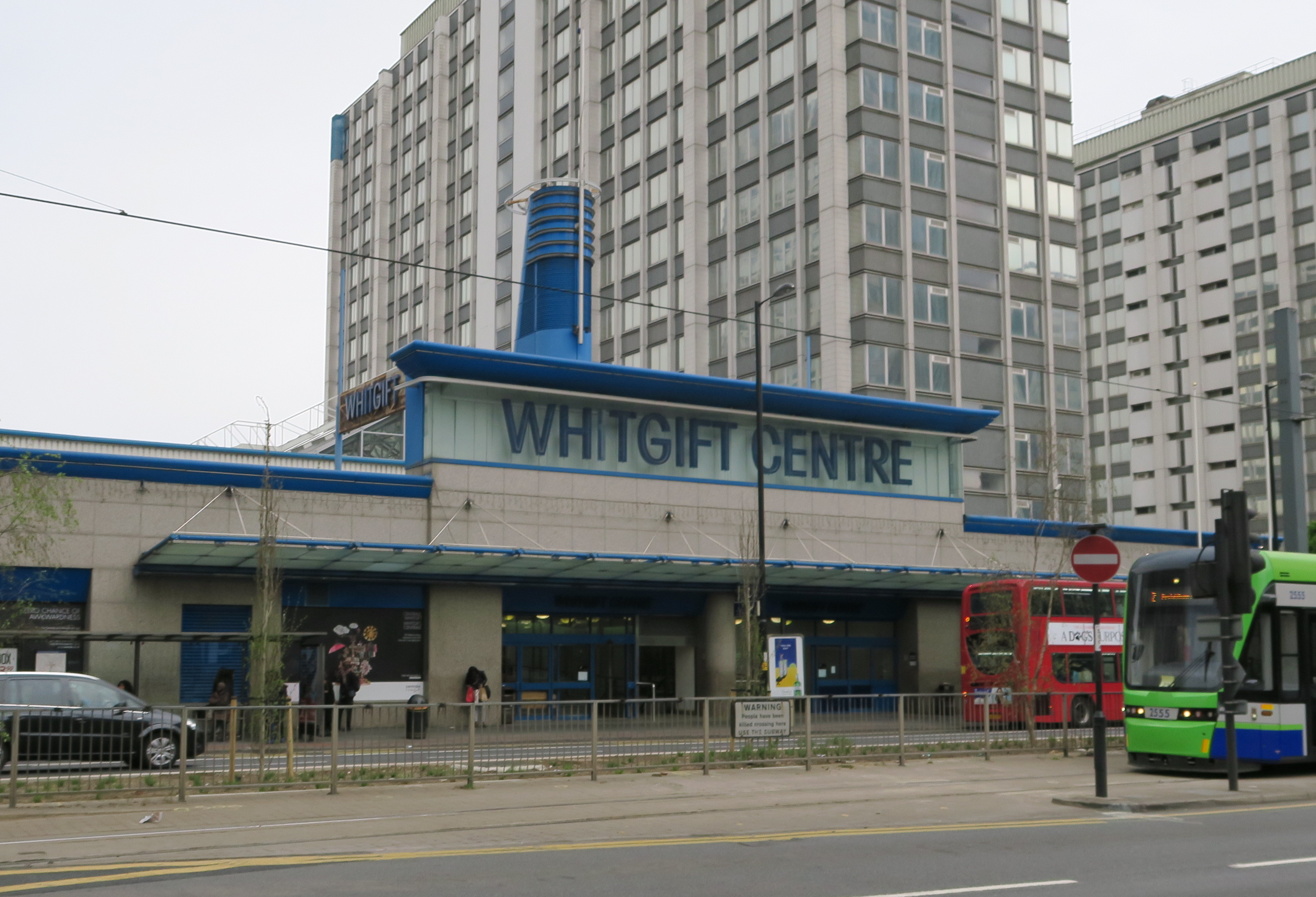
The Wellesley Road entrance

== Redevelopment ==
As part of Croydon Vision 2020, plans to develop and expand the centre were formalised by leaseholder and landlord Howard Holdings, for which a planning application was submitted. Construction of the extension was due to start in 2009 and be finished in 2014, as promised by Geddes Architects who were the main contractor.

In 2010, Howard Holdings went into administration. Their 75% of the lease company and management of the centre is now managed by their administrators, on behalf of Royal London Asset Management and the Irish Bank Resolution Corporation.

In mid-2011, two companies were invited to pitch for the redevelopment: Australian-based Westfield Group and UK-French based Hammerson. The Whitgift Foundation came to a binding agreement with Westfield for a £1bn redevelopment scheme. However, RLAM/IBRC preferred Hammerson, and so came to an alternate agreement, announcing Hammerson as the winner in April 2012. Although RLAM/IBRC owned 75% of the leasehold company, no development could take place without the agreement of the freeholder, the Whitgift Foundation. In mid-2012, the joint leaseholders agreed on a public consultation of the two rivals and their schemes. The winner was to be granted a long-term lease, subject to redevelopment.

In January 2013, Hammerson and Westfield formed a joint venture to redevelop the shopping mall. The joint venture company will purchase a 25% interest in the Whitgift Centre, following completion of Hammerson's conditional acquisition agreement with Royal London. Under the new agreement, they intend to redevelop and combine the two main Croydon shopping centres, the Whitgift Centre and Centrale. The mixed use scheme of around 200,000 m^{2} will include retail, leisure and residential use with the potential for hotels and offices.

On 25 November 2013, the redevelopment plan was approved by Croydon Council, subject to final approval by the Mayor of London on 27 November. Subsequently, plans were revised; in 2016, the expected start date for works was 2017, with completion due by 2020. These were later revised again with the planning application being decided upon in 2017 with construction to commence in 2018, later delayed until September 2019. As of January 2019, shop owners and council leaders did not know when redevelopment would begin. In February 2020 it was reported that the plan was delayed again as it was under "review".

The delays and uncertainty regarding the future of Whitgift has led to a reduced footfall and some traders moving out. Following the pandemic the uncertainty did not lessen.

In 2023 Unibail-Rodamco-Westfield acquired full ownership of the Whitgift and Centrale shopping centres.

== In popular culture ==
- The shopping centre sign appears in Andrew Haigh's 2023 romantic fantasy film All of Us Strangers.
- The shopping centre appears in Episode 5 of the fourth season of the British television sitcom IT Crowd.
- The shopping centre appears in the music video of the American singer-songwriter Taylor Swift's 2026 single "Opalite".

== Bibliography ==
- Nairn, Ian; Pevsner, Nikolaus (1971) [1962]. The Buildings of England: Surrey (2nd ed.). Harmondsworth: Penguin Books. ISBN 0-300-09675-5.
