= North End, Croydon =

Pedestrianised street in Croydon, London

Coordinates: 51.3756°N 0.1013°W

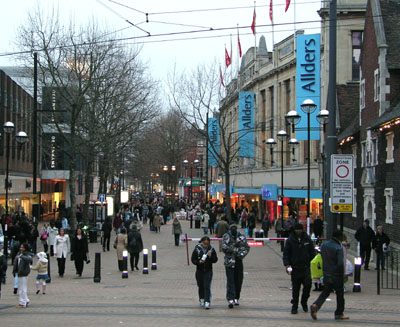
The eastern side of North End in 2005, showing on the right Allders and to the back left the Drummond Centre building of Centrale

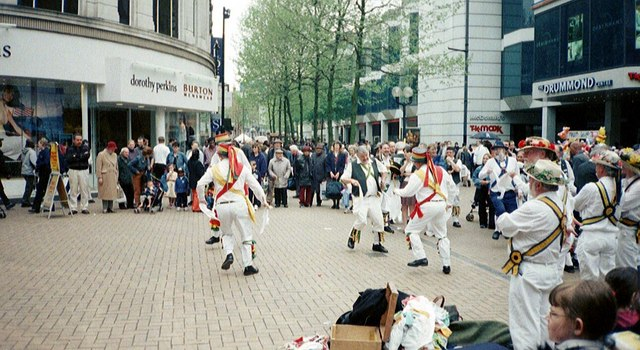
Morris dancers in North End, c. 2001

North End is a pedestrianised road in Central Croydon, which includes entrances to the town's two main shopping centres, Centrale and the Whitgift Centre. The road has high street chains including Next, Zara, French Connection, and a large branch of department store House of Fraser. A large Debenhams store on the west side of the road did not reopen after the 2020 Coronavirus lockdown as the company entered administration. North End was closed off to all forms of motor traffic in 1989, to entice shoppers to choose Croydon over its main south-east London rival Bromley.

On 26 November 2013, the Croydon Council approved a redevelopment of the town centre by The Croydon Partnership, a joint venture by The Westfield Corporation and Hammerson which would see the Whitgift Centre replaced with a Westfield shopping centre. London Mayor Boris Johnson approved the plan the following day. The Croydon Advertiser listed the approval as an "historic night for Croydon".

North End was the home of Allders department store, opened in 1862, which later became the flagship store of a chain extending across England and Wales. The company went into administration in 2005, and the Croydon store, the last to survive, closed in 2012. At the time of its closure it was the third-largest department store in Britain.

== Transport links ==
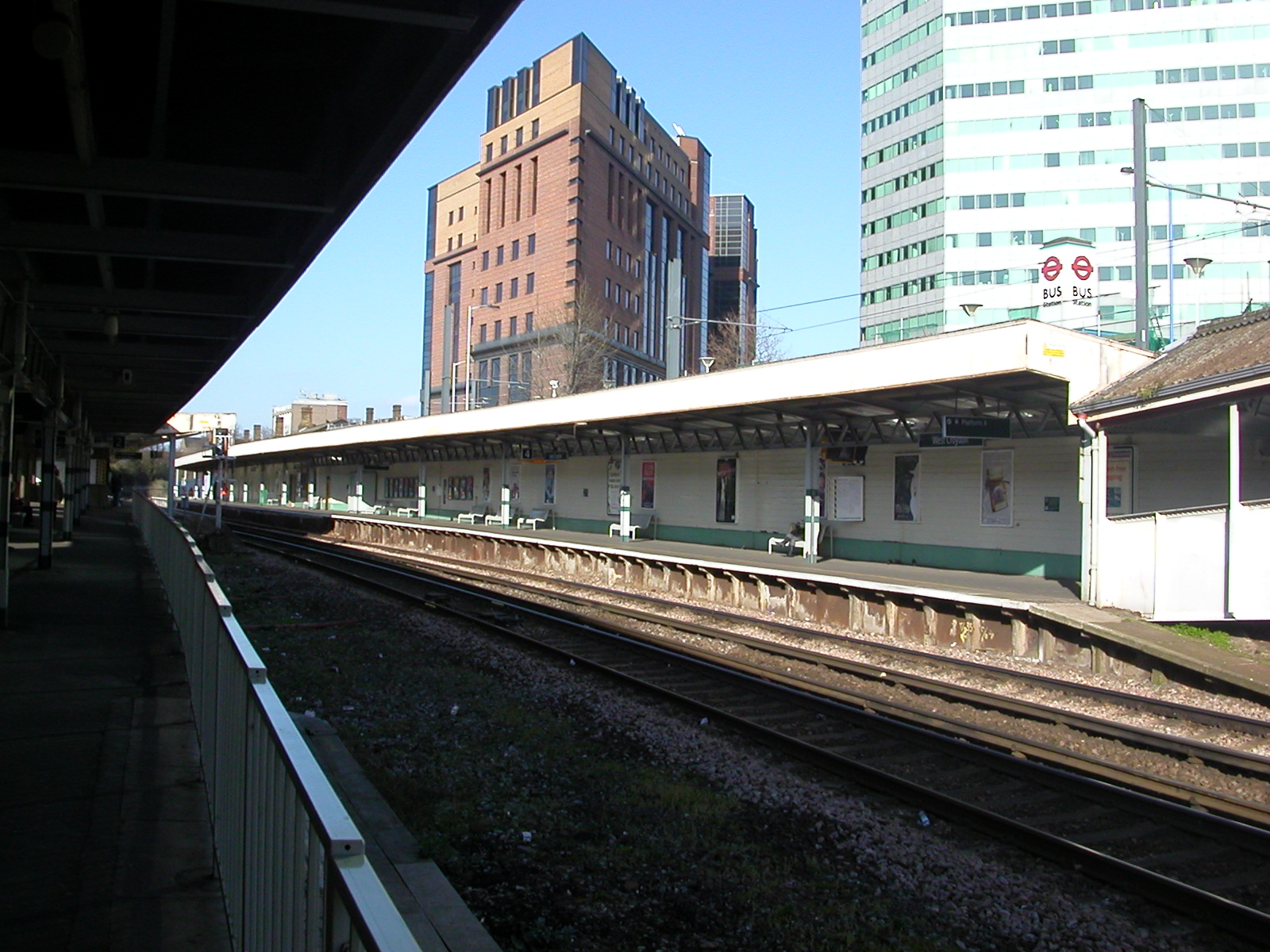
West Croydon railway station

North End has transport links both to the borough and to the surrounding areas in and out of London.

West Croydon railway station is located at the northern end of North End and is served by Southern and London Overground services. The East London Line was extended to West Croydon as its new terminus; now forming part of the London Overground project that connects Croydon with Crystal Palace and New Cross to Highbury & Islington across the River Thames and Clapham Junction. From these places connections are made to places like Watford, Euston, Barking, Stratford and Richmond. There is also a large bus station with many bus routes terminating there.

East Croydon railway station is the second busiest railway station in Greater London outside of London fare zone 1. It is located about 5 minutes east of the shopping area. There are services to London Victoria and London Bridge in Central London, Horsham, Gatwick Airport, Redhill, Caterham, Brighton and Tunbridge Wells. The rail services are provided by Southern and Thameslink.

Tramlink also provides frequent services from the four nearby stops. Croydon Central railway station was a former station at what is now the Croydon Clocktower. It was built so that shoppers could get closer to the main district but the idea failed and a new Town Hall was built in 1895 on the site of the platforms, with the remainder of the station site being incorporated into what became a small public park, now called the Queen's Gardens, where the retaining wall of the railway is visible as the northern boundary of the Gardens along Katherine Street.

Car parks around the centre include Centrale and Whitgift's own multi-storey car parks.

== See also ==
- South End (road)
- St George's Walk
- Surrey Street Market
