= Centrale, Croydon =

Shopping centre in Greater London, England

Centrale

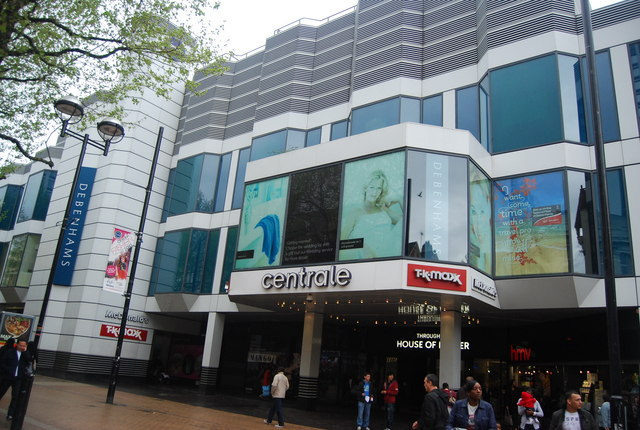
- Location: Croydon, Greater London, England
- Coordinates: 51.376°N 0.103°W
- Opened: 2004; 22 years ago
- Developer: Drummond Centre Group
- Owner: Unibail-Rodamco-Westfield
- Num. of stores: 61
- Num. of anchor tenants: 4
- Floor area: 6,180 m^{2} (66,500 sq ft)
- Floors: 4
- Website: www.centrale.co.uk

Centrale is a shopping centre in Croydon, South London. It is one of the largest covered retail developments in London. It is owned and managed by Unibail-Rodamco-Westfield and was opened in 2004. Plans were announced in January 2013 to redevelop Centrale and combine it with the Whitgift Centre.

Centrale is located on North End, Croydon, facing the Whitgift Centre. It was developed from the existing but much smaller Drummond Centre. It now contains a large store – House of Fraser and formerly a Debenhams store – and around 50 smaller stores including Next, H&M and Zara.

== Retail area ==
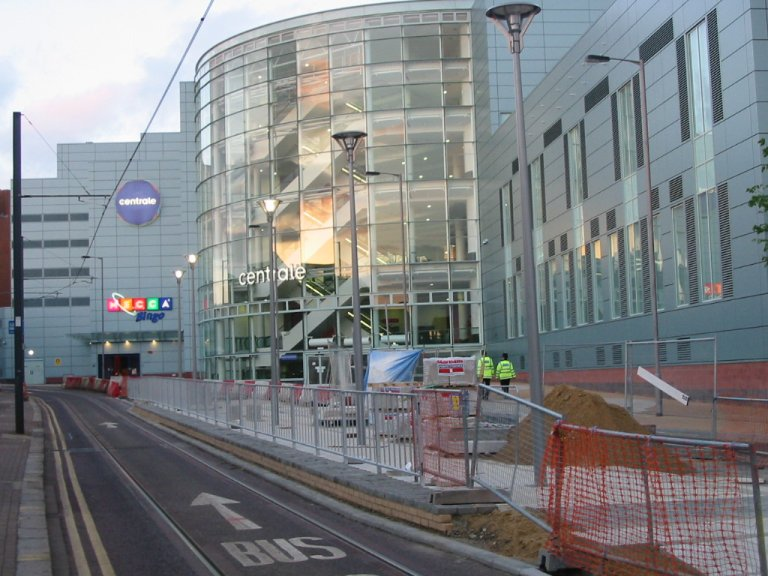
Western entrance to Centrale

The 820,000 sq ft (76,200 m^{2}) development also housed Croydon's first and only dedicated indoor food court on the upper level. The Food Gallery was given planning permission after the main centre was built and opened in November 2005 with seating for 200 diners. As of 2013, the Food Court has no tenants, the units being boarded up, however until 2020 there was still pedestrian access to the first floor of Debenhams until that store closed. Other food outlets in the centre formerly included McDonald's (one of eleven formerly in the London Borough of Croydon); and currently include Auntie Anne's, Cafe Giardino, and House of Fraser's Cafe Nero, replacing the World of Food, which had international cuisine available from a number of concessions including Yo! Sushi. Recent reports suggest that the remaining un-let units in the centre will be opened to exclusive outlets opening their first London stores outside the West End. The centre also houses a Mecca Bingo establishment.

It also has a 168,000 sq ft (15,600 m^{2}) House of Fraser, 21,000 sq ft (2,000 m^{2}) Zara and 51,000 sq ft (4,700 m^{2}) Next all of which was opened in 2004, along with a larger H&M, Mango, Uniqlo, and Timberland.

=== Design and layout ===
The building has been designed to maximise the view of west Croydon from the eastern windows including the IKEA Towers landmarks on Purley Way. The building also has solar panels on the roof according to a report which was highlighting Croydon's Ashburton Learning Village on 24dash.com. Centrale does not have numbered levels (as do many UK shopping centres), but instead names them as Keeley Road & Tamworth Road (lower basement), Lower Mall (basement), Ground Floor Mall and Upper Mall (first floor).

== Transport ==
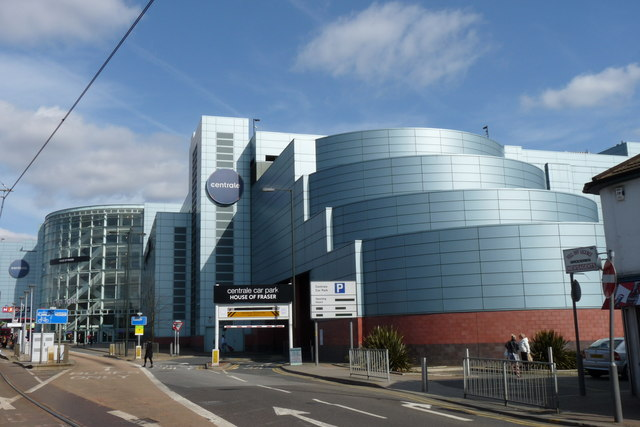
Centrale has its own tram stop

As part of the development, Centrale committed to and paid for improvements to North End and the provision of a new Tramlink stop, Centrale, located adjacent to the centre on Tamworth Road. The stop operates as a fully functioning transport interchange with trams stopping on one side of the platform and local buses on the other. It operates, along with West Croydon and East Croydon, as a Tramlink interchange on the 'Croydon Loop'. Along with this Centrale is very close to mainline railway station, West Croydon, which provides frequent services to Sutton and the surrounding areas in the London Borough of Croydon as well as services to Central London. East Croydon station is around a 10-minute walk from the centre.

== Drummond Centre ==
The Drummond Centre was a shopping centre located on North End in Croydon.

In 2013, Westfield and Hammerson entered a joint venture for the redevelopment of Westfield and Hammerson. However, they faced severe delays, changes in plan. Four of the seventeen units were still vacant when the mall closed. It could never compete with the larger Whitgift Centre across the road.

Neighbouring the centre was a large C&A store, which closed in 2004, this was combined with the Drummond Centre, rebuilt to become St. Martins Property Group's new shopping centre Centrale. The current North End entrance between Aldo and Zara is the former location of the Croydon C&A Store. The new shopping centre is more than triple the size of the Drummond, however the original part of the Drummond Centre was not refurbished as part of the development, which is noticeable when walking through the centre.

The centre was open seven days a week, Monday to Wednesday 10 a.m. - 6:30.p.m., Thursday 10 a.m. - 8 p.m., Friday 10 a.m. - 7 p.m., Saturday 9 a.m. - 7 p.m., Sunday 11.a.m. - 5 p.m.

== Store directory ==
P3	CAR PARK LEVELS 3-3A
P2	CAR PARK LEVELS 2-2A
UM	UPPER MALL & CAR PARK LEVELS 1-1A
G (formerly NE except on House of Fraser lifts)	GROUND (NORTH END MALL & DEPARTMENT STORE)
LM	LOWER MALL & DEPARTMENT STORE
0	TAMWORTH ROAD ENTRANCE LEVEL
-1	MECCA & DEPARTMENT STORE

== Stores ==
Centrale shopping centre houses many of the main high street destinations for Croydon, including primary anchor tenant House of Fraser, NEXT, H&M, Sports Direct, Superdrug, and a club shop for Crystal Palace FC. It formerly housed Boots, French Connection, La Senza, Miss Selfridge, H Samuel, TKMaxx, Carphone Warehouse, and secondary anchor tenant Debenhams; in May 2020, Debenhams announced plans to enter administration as a result of the Coronavirus lockdown and that some stores, including the large multiple-storey Centrale store, would not reopen. The store has been replaced with a further NEXT outlet.

== Westfield plans ==
In 2013 it was announced that the owners of Centrale had agreed to a joint venture with the owners of the neighbouring Whitgift Centre to redevelop both sites into the new Westfield Croydon Shopping Centre, however nothing has come of this plan as of 2024, and Unibail-Rodamco-Westfield seem more likely to redevelop the Allders building.
