= Leinster Chess Championship =

Annual competition in Ireland since 1912

The Leinster Chess Championship is an annual chess competition in Ireland, which was first played in 1912. It is run by the Leinster Chess Union and the winner is declared Leinster Champion. In recent years the competition has been in conjunction with another tournament, the City of Dublin (1999), the Irish Open (2001, 2003) and since 2012 as part of the Malahide Millennium Chess tournament.

== Winners ==
- 1912 – Charles J. Barry (Sackville)
- 1913 – Charles J. Barry (Sackville)
- 1914 – Charles J. Barry (Sackville)
- 1915-1919 No championship during First World War
- 1920 – Norman H. Wallace (Dublin)
- 1921 – Thomas George (T.G.) Cranston (Dublin)
- 1922 – Philip Baker (Sackville)
- 1924 – J.T. Gerrard
- 1925 – J. J. Doyle
- 1926 – Philip Baker
- 1928 – Ralph Theodore (R.T.) Varian
- 1929 – Patrick J. Laracy
- 1930 – J.T. Gerrard (U.C.D.)
- 1931 – Patrick J. Laracy (Dublin)
- 1933 – C. J. Barry (Sackville)
- 1934 – C. J. Barry (Sackville)
- 1935 – John (J.J.) O'Hanlon (Blackrock)
- 1936 – Thomas Cox (Blackrock)
- 1937 – Thomas Cox (Blackrock)
- 1938 – Thomas Cox (Dublin)
- 1940 – Gerard Kerlin (Sackville)
- 1941 – Gerard Kerlin (Sackville)
- 1946 – Paddy A. Duignan
- 1950 – Paddy A. Duignan (Sackville)
- 1951 – P. M. Austin Bourke (Colmcille)
- 1952 – Michael Schuster (Dublin)
- 1953 – Oscar Aiden Quigley (Dublin)
- 1954 – J.J. Walsh (Clontarf)
- 1955 – William Stanton (Eoghan Ruadh)
- 1956 – William Stanton (Eoghan Ruadh)
- 1957 – William Stanton (Eoghan Ruadh)
- 1958 – Matt Ryan (Sackville)
- 1959 – Michael Littleton (U.C.D.)
- 1960 – Dónal Déiseach (Sackville)
- 1961 – J.J. Walsh (Dublin)
- 1962 - P. J. Murphy (Eoghan Ruadh)
- 1963 – Michael Littleton
- 1964 – Tony Dennehy (Dublin)
- 1965 – Wolfgang Heidenfeld (Dublin)
- 1966 – Paul Cassidy (Kevin Barry) and Ray Cassidy (Eoghan Ruadh)
- 1967 – Eamon Keogh (Eoghan Ruadh)
- 1968 – Michael Littleton (Collegians) and Ken O’Riordan (Collegians)
- 1969 – Eamon Keogh (Eoghan Ruadh) and Wolfgang Heidenfeld (Dublin)
- 1970 – Eamon Keogh
- 1971 – Eamon Keogh (Ierne)
- 1972 – Wolfgang Heidenfeld
- 1973 – Ray Cassidy and Bernard Kernan
- 1974 – Ray Cassidy and Anthony (Tony) Doyle
- 1975 – David Dunne
- 1976 – Denis Healy
- 1977 – David Dunne
- 1978 – John Gibson
- 1979 – Tony Doyle
- 1980 – Paul Delaney (Rahney)
- 1981 – Tony Doyle (Rathfarnham)
- 1982 – Tony Doyle
- 1983 – Colm Barry, Kevin McHugh, Padraig O Tuathill
- 1984 – Pat Carton (Rahney), Joe Noone (Sandymount)
- 1985 – Eugene Curtin (Dundrum)
- 1986 – John Delaney (Sandymount)
- 1987 – Joe Ryan (Dún Laoghaire)
- 1989 – Jim McCarthy
- 1990 – Stephen Brady (Phibsboro)
- 1991 – Colm Daly
- 1992 – Gerry O'Connell (St. Benildus)
- 1993 – Colm Barry and Gerard MacElligott (Elm Mount)
- 1994 – Gerard MacElligott (Elm Mount)
- 1995 – Carlos Battaglini
- 1997 – Stephen Brady (Phibsboro) and Colm Daly
- 1999 – Mark Quinn – Run as part of City of Dublin
- 2001 – Daire McMahon (Crumlin) and Colm Daly – Run as part of Irish Open
- 2002 - Joe Ryan (Phibsboro)
- 2003 - Stephen Brady (Phibsboro) – Run as part of Irish Open
- 2004 - Jörg Weidemann FM
- 2005 – Alexander Baburin GM (Kilkenny)
- 2006 – Karl McPhillips (Dublin University)
- 2007 – Gavin Wall IM
- 2008 – David Fitzsimons (Elm Mount)
- 2009 – Not held
- 2010 – David Fitzsimons (Elm Mount)
- 2011 – John Joyce (Bray/Greystones)

Run as part of the Malahide Millennium:

- 2012 – Colm Daly (Bray/Greystones)
- 2013 – Juri Firstov (Phibsboro)
- 2014 – John Delaney (Blanchardstown Juniors)
- 2015 – Colm Daly FM (Bray/Greystones)
- 2016 – Colm Daly FM (Bray/Greystones)
- 2017 – Mel O'Cinneide (St. Benildus)
- 2018 – Colm Daly FM (Bray/Greystones)
- 2019 – Gavin Melaugh (Dublin University)
