= James Creevey =

James Creevey may refer to:

- James H. Morgan (Medal of Honor) (1840–1877), born James H. Creevey, Union Navy sailor and Medal of Honor recipient
- James Creevey (chess player) (1873–1967), Irish chess player
