= James Alexander Porterfield Rynd =

James Alexander Porterfield Rynd (6 April 1846 – 17 March 1917) was an Irish chess player and lawyer.

Porterfield Rynd was born on 6 April 1846, the son of Dublin solicitor James William Goodlatte Rynd and Isabella Susannah Stephens Rynd. His uncle (his fathers half brother) was Dr. Francis Rynd, the inventor of the hollow needle syringe. His cousin, Maria Rynd, was First Lady of Bolivia in 1879.

Porterfield Rynd won the Dublin Chess Congress No. 3 Tournament in 1865. This tournament, run alongside an international chess tournament in Dublin, was reserved for residents of Ireland and is widely considered to be the first Irish Chess Championship.

Porterfield Rynd's birth date is often listed incorrectly as 1855, creating speculation on his claim to the Irish championship in 1865, such as The Guinness Book of Chess Records by Ken Whyld. However, further articles and his obituaries discount this and state he was born in 1846 and died aged 71 in 1917.

Porterfield Rynd was accepted as the Irish Chess Champion until 1886, when a tournament was hosted by the Irish Chess Association to find an Irish Champion. Rynd won the title again in 1892. Porterfield Rynd held an LLB, in 1869 he entered the King's Inns, Dublin, and was called to the Bar in 1874. On 7 September 1869 he married Anna Cranwill and on 9 October 1873 his first child was born: Kenneth Arly Rynd.

He was a member of Clontarf Tennis and Chess Club, and played many sports in his youth. Rynd was a member of Dublin Chess Club and played in the first ever Armstrong Cup, the oldest Irish league competition. He briefly wrote a column for the Irish Sportsman and Farmer.

In the 1890s Porterfield Rynd edited a chess column which regularly appeared on the back page of the Saturday issue of Dublin's Evening Herald. He was not burdened with modesty and the title Irish Champion appears beside his column.

He died in Dublin on 17 March 1917, his obituary was in the Irish Times of Monday 19 March 1917, RYND – 17 March 1917 JAMES ALEXANDER PORTERFIELD RYND, Barrister-at-Law, in his 71st year, and there was also an obituary in the Belfast Newsletter 22 March 1917.

== Politics ==
Porterfield Rynd was a Unionist and produced a pamphlet of his thoughts on the subject in 1906 for the Irish Unionist Association.

A letter of Rynd's outlining support for the unionist cause are contained in letters to Bonar Law, to whom the Colourful Rynd was described as being a confidante. Rynd was also associated with the Dublin Liberal Unionist Association, serving as its chairman.
