= Sam Collins (chess player) =

Irish chess player (born 1982)

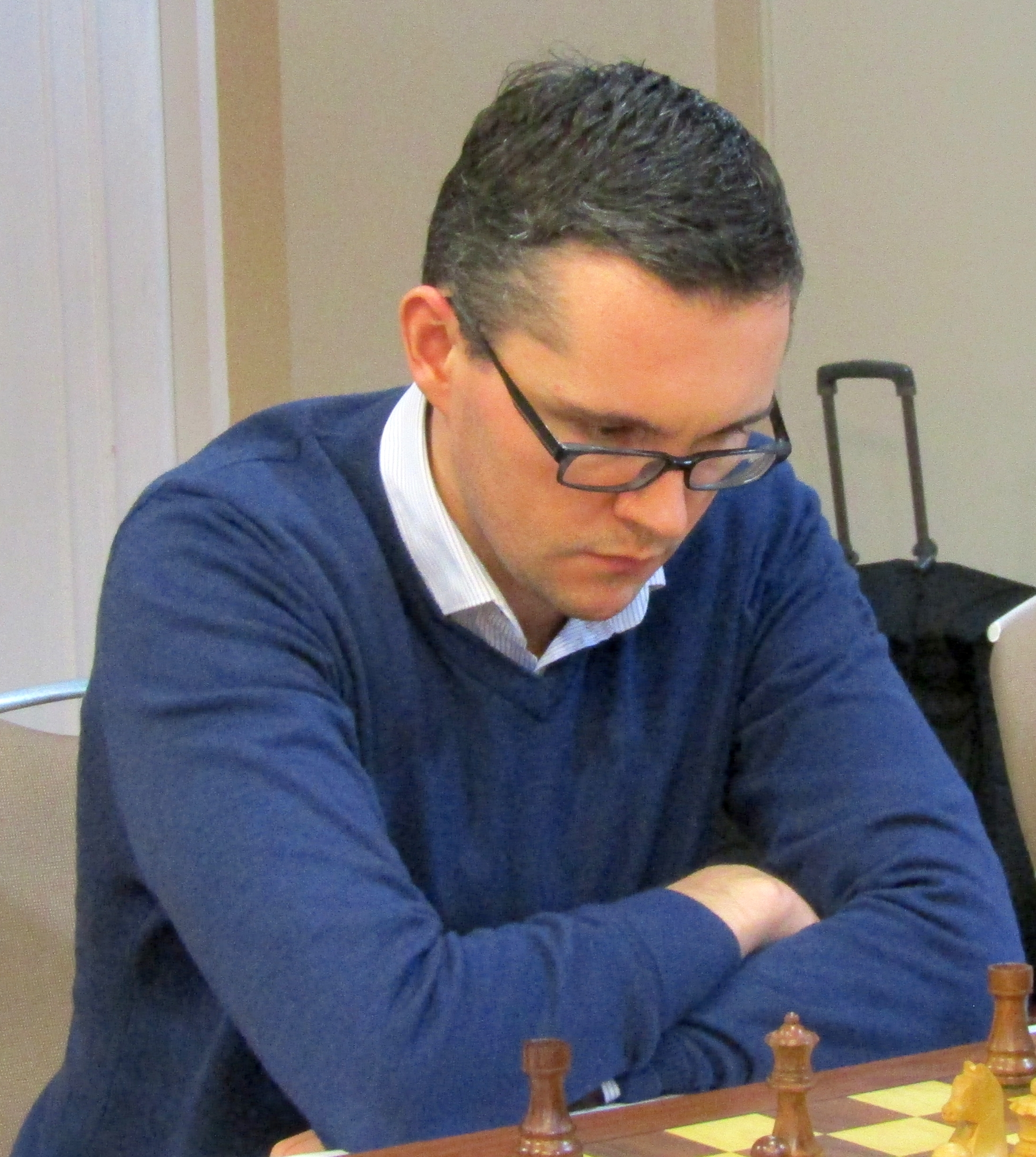
- Collins in 2017

Personal information
- Born: September 5, 1982 (age 43) Dublin, Ireland

Chess career
- Country: Ireland
- Title: International Master (2004)
- FIDE rating: 2462 (July 2026)
- Peak rating: 2495 (August 2014)

Sam E. Collins (born 5 September 1982) is an Irish chess player. He was awarded the title International Master by FIDE in 2004.

== Junior career ==
Born in Dublin, Collins' career began while a student in Gonzaga College, a school with a strong chess tradition. During his time at Gonzaga, he led the school to its second Millfield International chess tournament, which was considered the de facto Britain and Ireland schools' championships. Collins was named outstanding player of the tournament, an award previously won by such masters as Mark Quinn, Brian Kelly, Mark Ferguson and Michael Adams. Individually, Collins represented his country in both junior competition – the Glorney Cup – and the Chess Olympiad – at the time, the youngest Irishman to do so.

== Senior career ==
Collins represented Ireland at every Olympiad between 2000 and 2014, playing on the first board in both 2010 and 2012. In the 2002 edition, held in Bled, Slovenia, he won the gold medal for second reserve, scoring 7½/8 points. In the 2004 Olympiad, in Calvià, Spain, he achieved the title of International Master (IM).

Collins has achieved three norms required for the title of Grandmaster, won in 2008, 2010, and 2018 respectively. His peak FIDE rating of 2495 is the highest achieved by an Irish-born player.

Collins has won the Irish Chess Championship twice, in 2002 and in 2014, and the Japanese Chess Championship once in 2009. Among his best one off results are his draw with Alexander Grischuk in the 2010 Olympiad and his defeat of Viktor Korchnoi in 2011.

Collins currently plays out of the Gonzaga Chess Club, whose first team includes French Grandmaster Sebastien Mazé and Irish internationals Stephen Jessel and Conor O'Donnell. With Collins rotating with Mazé on the top board, the club won the 2015, 2016, and 2017 editions of the Armstrong Cup.

Internationally, Collins is perhaps best known as an author of chess books and DVDs. He has also taught at the Berkeley Chess School.

== Personal life ==
Following school, Collins studied for a degree in law at University College Dublin, before being called to the bar. He holds an LLM from the University of London and currently practises as a barrister in Dublin.

== Publications ==
- Ruy Lopez: Attacking with the Schliemann by Sam Collins, Chessbase (PC-DVD), 2015.
- Karpov: Move by Move by Sam Collins, Everyman Chess, 2015.
- The Tarrasch: Move by Move by Sam Collins, Everyman Chess, 2014.
- Chess explained: The c3 Sicilian by Sam Collins, Gambit Publications, 2007.
- An attacking repertoire for White by Sam Collins, Batsford, 2005.
- The French Advance by Sam Collins, Everyman Chess, 2006.
- The King's Indian Defence: Move by Move by Sam Collins, Everyman Chess, 2017.
- Understanding the Chess Openings by Sam Collins, Gambit Publications, 2021.
