= Creevey =

Creevey is a surname and may refer to:

- Alo Creevey, fictional character from the third generation of the British teen drama Skins
- James Creevey (1840–1877), birth name of James H. Morgan, Union Navy sailor in the American Civil War and a recipient of the Medal of Honor
- James Creevey (chess player) (1873–1967), Irish chess player
- Thomas Creevey (1768–1838), English politician known for his papers published in 1903

== See also ==
- Shane Creevey of D-Side, Irish boyband established in 2001, by twins Rory and Eoghan MacSweeney
- The Creevey Brothers (Colin and Dennis Creevey), fictional characters in J. K. Rowling's Harry Potter series of books
