= Stephen Brady (chess player) =

Irish chess player (born 1969)

Personal information
- Born: 12 March 1969 (age 57)

Chess career
- Country: Ireland
- Title: FIDE Master (1992)
- Peak rating: 2397 (May 2012)

Stephen Brady (born 12 March 1969) is an Irish chess player and FIDE Master.

He became a nine time Irish national champion, in some cases together with another player, in the years 1991, 1992, 2001, 2003, 2006, 2007, 2011, 2012 and 2015. Brady also won the Leinster Chess Championship in 1990, 1997 and 2003. He has played for Phibsboro Chess Club, with whom he has won the Armstrong Cup – Division one of the Leinster Leagues on seven occasions, and also won the Irish National Club Championships in 2003. More recently he has played for St. Benildus Chess Club.

His favourite chess opening is the King's Gambit.
