= Philip Baker (chess player) =

Latvian-born Irish chess player

Philip Baker (1880 – c. May 1932) was an Irish chess player. He won the Irish Chess Championship in 1924, 1927, 1928, and 1929.

Baker, who was Jewish, was born in 1880 in Riga, Latvia (then part of the Russian Empire). A draper and cap maker by profession, he lived in Tralee, County Kerry before moving to Dublin.

He was Leinster champion in 1922 and 1926. In 1924 Baker finished first in the Tailteann Games. With the Sackville Chess Club Baker won the Armstrong Cup in 1926 and 1929.

He died in Rathmines, Dublin in May 1932.

His granddaughter Rosalind married the judge Henry Barron.
