= William Minnis =

Irish chess player

Personal information
- Born: 1902 Belfast, Ireland
- Died: unknown

Chess career
- Country: Ireland

William Minnis (1902 — unknown), was an Irish chess player, two-times Ulster Chess Championship winner (1939, 1945).

== Biography ==
In the end of 1930s to the end of 1940s William Minnis was one of the strongest Irish chess players. He two times won Ulster Chess Championships: 1939, and 1945. Also William Minnis two times won Belfast Feis chess tournament (1940, 1944) and won Williamson Shield chess tournament in 1949. He worked as secretary in Ulster Chess Union in 1938. William Minnis two times participated in Irish Chess Championships (1946, 1947).

William Minnis played for Ireland in the Chess Olympiad:

- In 1939, at fourth board in the 8th Chess Olympiad in Buenos Aires (+0, =2, -13).
