= Wolfgang Heidenfeld =

German-South African chess player (1911–1981)

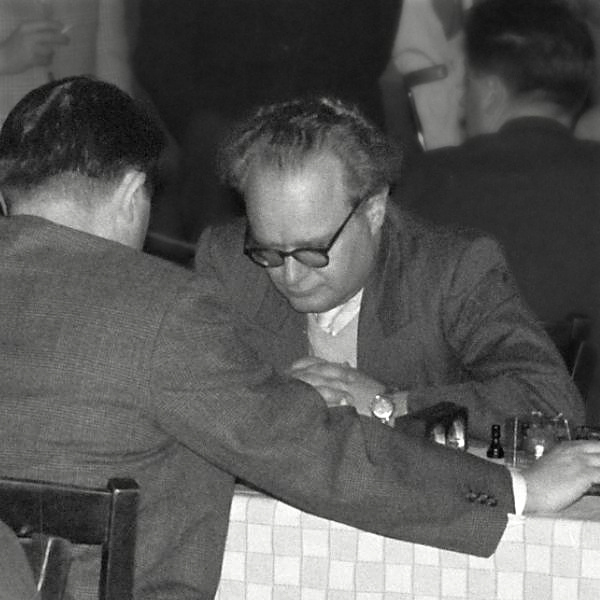

Personal information
- Born: 29 May 1911 Berlin, German Empire
- Died: 3 August 1981 (aged 70) Ulm, Baden-Württemberg, West Germany

Chess career
- Country: Germany, South Africa, Ireland

Wolfgang Heidenfeld (German pronunciation: [ˈvɔlfɡaŋ ˈhaɪdn̩fɛlt]; 29 May 1911 – 3 August 1981) was a German chess player and chess composer.

== Biography ==
Heidenfeld was born in Berlin. He was forced to move from Germany to South Africa in the 1930s because he was a Jew. There, he won the South African Chess Championship eight times, and he represented South Africa in the Chess Olympiad in 1958. Besides playing chess, he was also a writer, door-to-door salesman, journalist, and designer of crossword puzzles. His hobbies were poker, bridge and collecting stamps as well as playing chess. During World War II, he used his fluency in German to help decode German messages for the Allies. Despite having so many different interests and activities to engage into, he nevertheless managed to succeed in chess to the point of becoming national champion in both of the countries he lived in.

In 1955, he beat former world champion Max Euwe. He also won games against Miguel Najdorf, Joaquim Durao and Ludek Pachman. He never became an International Master—he did eventually attain the required qualifications but declined to accept the award from FIDE.

He wrote several chess books, including Chess Springbok (1955), My Book of Fun and Games (1958), Grosse Remispartien (1968; in German; an English edition entitled Draw!, edited by John Nunn, was published in 1982), and Lacking the Master Touch (1970).

In 1957, after visiting Ireland, he moved to Dublin. In 1979, the family moved back to Ulm, where he died two years later.

Heidenfeld was Irish Champion in 1958, 1963, 1964, 1967, 1968, and 1972. He won the Leinster Chess Championship in 1965, 1969 (shared), and 1972. He was in the Olympiad team in 1966, 1968, 1970 and 1974; and in the European Championships team in 1967.

His son Mark Heidenfeld is an International Master, has also played chess for Ireland, and won the Irish Chess Championship in 2000 and 2021.

The Heidenfeld Trophy, the second division, of the Leinster chess league, is named in his honour.

== See also ==
- Castling#Examples One of Heidenfeld's games
