= P. Kilian Rohan =

Irish meteorologist

Patrick Kilian Rohan
- Born: 31 July 1916; Ballina, County Tipperary, Ireland
- Died: 26 April 1999 (aged 82); Dublin
- Occupation: Meteorologist

P. Kilian Rohan (31 July 1916 – 26 April 1999) was an Irish aviation meteorologist, climatologist, and fourth director of the Irish Meteorological Service.

== Life ==
Patrick Kilian Rohan was born on 31 July 1916 in Ballina, County Tipperary. He had three brothers, Mortimer, Matthew, and Thomas. After attending national school locally, he attended the Christian Brothers' School on Sexton Street, Limerick. He graduated from University College Dublin in 1938 with a BA in mathematics, followed by an MA in 1939.

With his wife, Eileen, Rohan had 3 children. He died on 26 April 1999.

== Career ==
Rohan joined the newly established Irish Meteorological Service (IMS) in 1940 during the second major recruitment drive for Met Officer cadets. Having finished his training in 1942, he was first posted to Foynes providing forecasts for the flying boats. In his early career, while posted to Valentia Observatory during World War II, he kept watch for barrage balloons that had come free of their moorings and were floating free. He went on to be the Officer in Charge of the Meteorological Office at Rineanna (now Shannon Airport), succeeding P. M. Austin Bourke, from 1948 until 1970. During this time, Rineanna was the main European hub for North Atlantic civil aviation. In 1952, he was involved in the creation of an civil aviation school at the Limerick Technical Institute.

In 1958, he was appointed the first chair of the International Civil Aviation Organisation's (ICAO) Meteorological Telecommunications Network for Europe (MONTE Panel), which sought to address the need for better communication between meteorological services and the expanding aviation market. He served on the MONTE Panel until 1971. Between 1964 and 1967, Rohan was an active member of the World Meteorological Organisation's Commission for Aeronautical Meteorology. In 1964, Rohan lived in Montreal for 6 months while he rewrote the Meteorological Annex of the Chicago Convention of ICAO.

In 1970, Rohan was appointed Head of Climatology at the IMS, and relocated to Dublin. He championed the use of computers in climate study in Ireland, and wrote two books: The Climate of Dublin and The Climate of Ireland (1976). The Climate of Ireland was the first authoritative and comprehensive description of the Irish climate.

Rohan was appointed assistant director of the IMS in 1975, and later succeeded P. M. Austin Bourke as director of the IMS in 1978. His assistant director was Donal Linehan. He became the third president of the European Centre for Medium-Range Weather Forecasts (ECMWF) in 1980. Also in 1979 and 1980, he oversaw the move of the IMS headquarters from 44 O'Connell Street to Glasnevin Hill. He retired from the IMS in 1981.
