= J.J. Walsh (chess player) =

Jim "J.J." Walsh is an Irish chess player, chess correspondent and the compiler of the daily chess puzzle in The Irish Times. Walsh started contributing a weekly chess column and puzzle in the Irish Times in April 1955, and since September 1972 the daily chess puzzle, making his puzzle one of the longest running chess articles in the world.

He played chess in the Leinster leagues for Clontarf, Eoghan Ruadh and Dublin Chess Club, winning the Armstrong Cup on a number of occasions as well as the Irish National Club Championships. Jim represented Ireland in three Olympiads, Amsterdam 1954, Moscow 1956 (playing on board 1) and Munich 1958. Walsh won the Leinster Schools chess competition in 1949, and won the Leinster Chess Championship in 1954 and 1961.

As well as for The Irish Times, Jim also wrote contributed articles to other papers such as The People and The Sunday People. He edited the Irish Chess Journal on occasions, and has contributed articles and chess book reviews to a number of publications.

In recognition of his contribution to Irish Chess, in 2014, Jim was made a life member of the Irish Chess Union and a trophy was named in his honour.
