= Gerard Kerlin =

Irish chess player (1910–1946)

Personal information
- Born: 29 October 1910 Dublin, Ireland
- Died: 12 June 1946 (aged 35) Dublin, Ireland

Chess career
- Country: Ireland

Gerard Joseph Kerlin (29 October 1910 – 12 June 1946) was an Irish chess player and two-times Leinster Chess Championship winner (1940, 1941).

== Biography ==
In the end of 1930s to the mid-1940s Gerard Kerlin was one of the strongest Irish chess players. He three times participated in Irish Chess Championships (1937, 1939, 1940). His best result in this tournament was shared 2nd - 3rd place in 1939. Gerard Kerlin two times in row won Leinster Chess Championships: 1940, and 1941. Also, he won Dunsany Premier in 1941.

Gerard Kerlin played for Ireland in the Chess Olympiad:

- In 1939, at third board in the 8th Chess Olympiad in Buenos Aires (+2, =7, -6).
