= Tom O'Gorman (chess player) =

Irish chess player (born 2002)

Personal information
- Born: December 13, 2002 (age 23) Dublin, Ireland

Chess career
- Country: Ireland
- Title: International Master (2024)
- FIDE rating: 2404 (November 2026)
- Peak rating: 2404 (October 2026)

Tom O'Gorman is an Irish chess player.

== Chess career ==
In 2015, O'Gorman represented Ireland at the Glorney Cup. In that same year, he won the under-19 section of the Irish Junior Chess Championship. Also in 2015, he defeated Irish FIDE master Colm Daly in a simultaneous exhibition match.

In 2016, he competed at the Reykjavik Open, where he scored +4=1-3, including a loss against IM Tania Sachdev.

He won the Irish Chess Championship in 2020.

He competed at the Reykjavik Open again in 2023, scoring +5=0-4, including a loss against IM Nisha Mohota.

In September 2024, he played for Ireland in the 45th Chess Olympiad in Budapest, Hungary, scoring +5=3-1. He was the top scorer on the Irish team, and notably defeated grandmaster Tamir Nabaty.

In March 2025, he played for Oxford University in their match against Cambridge University, becoming the most successful player in the history of the event after achieving a perfect socre in the first five rounds.

In June 2025, he competed at the World Rapid and Blitz Team Chess Championships. In the blitz section, he scored a draw against former World Champion Viswanathan Anand.

== Personal life ==
His sister Alice O'Gorman is also a chess player.
