= Tarun Kanyamarala =

Indian-Irish chess player (born 2004)

Personal information
- Born: October 17, 2004 (age 22) Hyderabad, India

Chess career
- Country: India (until 2017); Ireland (since 2017)
- Title: International Master (2022)
- FIDE rating: 2421 (November 2026)
- Peak rating: 2435 (July 2026)

Tarun Kanyamarala is an Indian-Irish chess player.

== Chess career ==
In April 2019, he won a silver medal in the Under-15 category at the FIDE World School Individual Championships in Antalya, Turkey, finishing behind gold medalist Javokhir Sindarov.

In October 2019, he won the Limerick Open with an undefeated score of 5.5/6, having finished a half-point ahead of the runners-up Gabriel Voiteanu and Henry Li.

In January 2020, he defeated grandmaster Georg Meier (who was rated 300 points higher) at the Dublin Gonzaga Masters. This was his first victory against a grandmaster.

In March 2022, he became Ireland's youngest International Master at the age of 17 years and 5 months, beating Brian Kelly's record from 1998.

In July 2022, he won the Irish Chess Championship (the same year his sister won the Irish Women's Championship) and later played for the country in the 44th Chess Olympiad.

In June 2026, he tied for first place at the 20th HSG Open in Hilversum alongside Max Warmerdam, scoring 5/6 points and placing second on tiebreaks.

== Personal life ==
His younger sister is Trisha Kanyamarala, who won the British Women's Chess Championship in 2024.

=== Business and media ===
In June 2023, Kanyamarala co-founded a chess technology company called Ireland Chess Technology Limited in Portlaoise along with his sister.
