= Karl McPhillips =

Irish chess player

Personal information
- Born: April 11, 1988 (age 38)

Chess career
- Country: Ireland
- Title: FIDE Master (2015)
- Peak rating: 2327 (December 2015)

Karl McPhillips (11 April 1988) is an Irish chess player with FIDE rating 2240 in 2005 and 2303 in 2016. He is FIDE Master (FM).

In February 2005 he won the Gonzaga Classics. In July 2005 he became third at the national Irish chess championships, held in Dublin, scoring 6.5/9. In the same year he was one of four boys, selected by the Irish Chess League to participate in the World Junior Chess Championship.

In 2011 and in 2014 he won the Armstrong Cup.
