= Philip Short (chess player) =

Irish chess player

Personal information
- Born: May 15, 1960 Cork, Ireland
- Died: August 31, 2018 (aged 58) County Galway, Ireland

Chess career
- Country: Ireland
- Title: FIDE Master (1990)
- Peak rating: 2334 (December 2018)

Philip Michael Short (15 May 1960 – 31 August 2018) was an Irish competitive chess player, FIDE Master and five times Irish chess champion.

He won the Irish Chess Championship in 1981, 1986, 1988, 2015 and 2017 as well as the Provincial Championship of Munster in 1989, 1991 and 1993 and the Provincial Championship of Connacht in 2013, 2014, 2016 and 2017. Furthermore, he was a regular player in Irish open weekend tournaments and placed first at the Kilkenny Chess Congress in 1977, 1979 and 1980, at the Mulcahy Memorial in 1984, 1991 and 1993, and at the Cork Congress in 1994.

He participated with the Irish team at the 25th Chess Olympiad in 1982 and the 27th Chess Olympiad in 1986, both times on board three. In 1990, he was awarded the title of a FIDE Master. He also played for the Douglas Chess Club in the 1993 and 1997 European Chess Club Cup.
