= Met Éireann =

Meteorological service of Ireland

Agency overview
- Formed: 1936; 90 years ago
- Preceding Agency: British Meteorological Office (1880–1936)
- Jurisdiction: Ireland
- Headquarters: Meteorological Centre, 65–67 Glasnevin Hill, Dublin 9, D09 Y921; 53°22′33″N 6°16′11″W
- Minister responsible: Darragh O'Brien, TD, Minister for Housing, Local Government and Heritage
- Agency executive: Eoin Moran, Director
- Parent department: Department of Housing, Local Government and Heritage
- Website: www.met.ie

Met Éireann (Irish pronunciation: [mʲɛtʲ ˈeːɾʲən̪ˠ]; meaning "Met of Ireland") is the state meteorological service of Ireland, part of the Department of Housing, Local Government and Heritage.

== History ==
The history of modern meteorology in Ireland dates back to 8 October 1860, when the first weather observations were transmitted from Valentia Observatory on Valentia Island in County Kerry to the British Meteorological Office. A network of weather stations was established around the coasts of the United Kingdom of Great Britain and Ireland.

Following the independence of most of Ireland as the Irish Free State in December 1922, the new Free State continued to rely on the British Met Office for weather services, and the Met Office continued to administer the weather stations around the Free State. With the advent of transatlantic air services in the 1930s, it was decided that Ireland needed its own weather service to provide detailed aviation weather reports.

In 1936, the Irish Meteorological Service was set up, with its headquarters in St. Andrew's Street, Dublin. In 1937, it took over the network of weather stations from the British Met Office. On the date of transfer, the Irish weather observation network consisted of the following stations:

- Valentia Observatory, then the only permanently staffed weather station
- 4 telegraphic stations (at Malin Head, Blacksod Point, Roche's Point and Birr)
- 18 climatological stations
- 172 rainfall stations

At first, the new weather service was bolstered by Met Office employees seconded from London, but by 1941 they were able to depend on their own resources. During 'the Emergency' (as the Second World War was referred to in the neutral part of Ireland), the Irish Meteorological Service supplied the Allies with weather information despite the official neutrality of Ireland. The decision to go ahead with the D-day landings was made following a favourable weather report from the Blacksod Point weather station in County Mayo.

Former headquarters of the Irish Meteorological Service at 44 O'Connell Street

The service expanded rapidly in the post-war years, with its headquarters relocating to 44 O'Connell Street, opposite The Gresham Hotel in Dublin. The service began supplying forecasts to Radio Éireann from 1948, to daily newspapers from 1952, to television from shortly after the first Raidió Teilifís Éireann (RTÉ) television broadcasts in 1962, and recorded telephone forecasts in the 1960s. Ireland joined the World Meteorological Organisation in the 1950s, and was a founder member of the European Centre for Medium-Range Weather Forecasts in 1975 and EUMETSAT in 1983.

In 1979, the service moved to new purpose-built premises in Glasnevin, Dublin, designed by Liam McCormick (primarily known for his ecclesiastical buildings in Ulster). In 1996 the service was renamed to Met Éireann.

Met Éireann launched their first website in 2001. In addition to the website they now also have Mobile Apps for Android and iOS developed by FUSIO.

=== Directors of Met Éireann, 1936–present ===
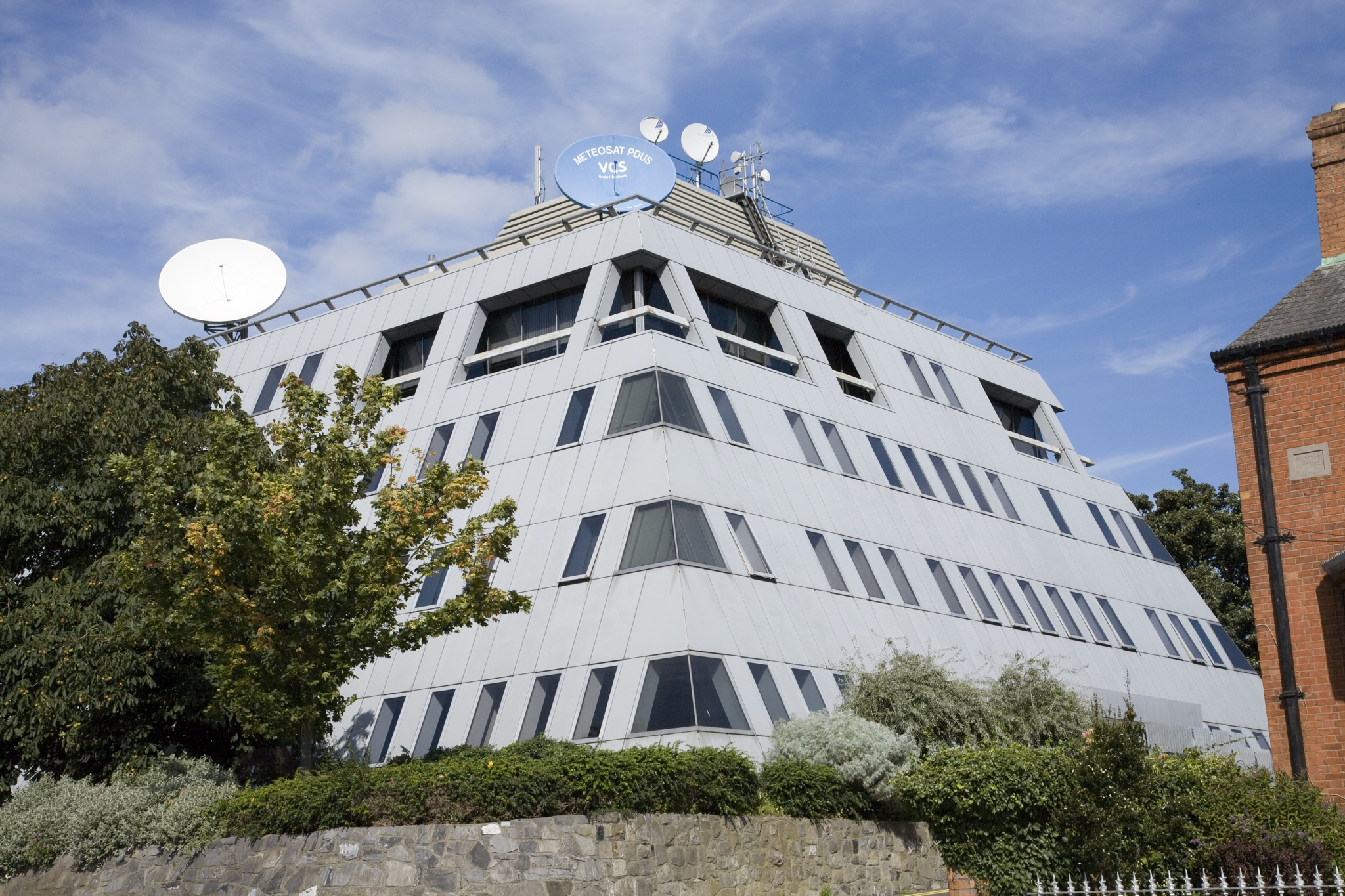
- Met Éireann headquarters in the Glasnevin area of Dublin
  1936–1948: Austen H. Nagle
- 1948–1964: Mariano Doporto
- 1965–1978: P. M. Austin Bourke
- 1978–1981: P. Kilian Rohan
- 1981–1988: Donal Linehan
- 1989–2009: Declan J. Murphy
- 2009–2016: Liam Campbell
- 2016–present: Eoin Moran

== Activities ==
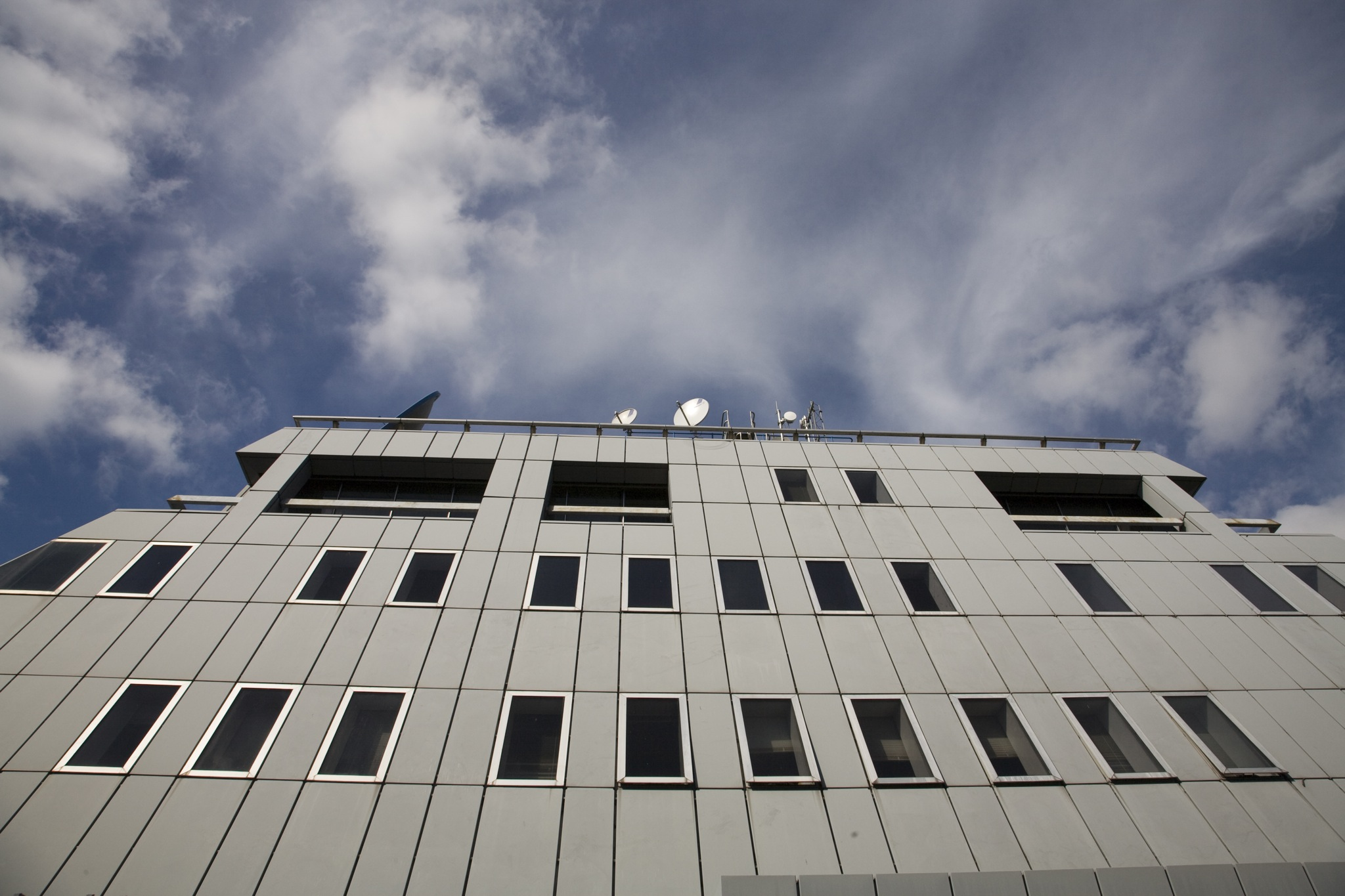
Met Éireann

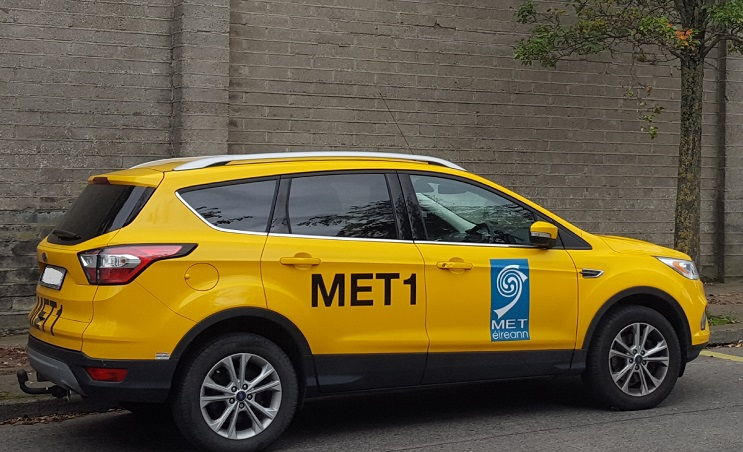
Mobile meteorological van

=== Forecasting methodology ===
Met Éireann uses the HIRLAM weather model for short-term forecasts (up to 48 hours). This model is developed cooperatively by multiple European weather services. Met Éireann runs a 10 km resolution HIRLAM model four times daily. The operational running of this model has been managed by the Irish Centre for High-End Computing (ICHEC) since 2005. Met Éireann and ICHEC are working on bringing a 5 km resolution HIRLAM model into production by the end of 2010.

For medium-term forecasts (between 48 hours and approximately two weeks), Ireland along with 17 other European states, relies on forecasts provided by the European Centre for Medium-Range Weather Forecasts in the United Kingdom.

Climate supercomputer

In November 2021, Met Éireann partnered up with the met offices of Iceland, Denmark and the Netherlands to create a supercomputer to give more accurate short term weather readings in the face of climate change. It will be up by 2023 and will be powered by Icelandic 100% green electricity.

=== Observing stations ===
- Belmullet, County Mayo
- Ballyhaise, County Cavan
- Gurteen, County Tipperary
- Claremorris, County Mayo
- Roche's Point, County Cork
- Sherkin Island, County Cork
- Mace Head, County Galway
- Oak Park, County Carlow
- Malin Head, County Donegal
- Mullingar, County Westmeat
- Johnstown Castle, County Wexford
- Valentia Observatory, Cahirciveen, County Kerry

The service also runs many more automated observation stations around the State, including –

- Moorepark, Fermoy, County Cork
- Grange, Dunsany, County Meath
- Mount Dillon, County Longford
- Markree Castle, County Sligo
- Finner Camp, County Donegal
- Athenry, County Galway

=== Aviation forecasting ===
As Ireland is strategically located on the busy air routes between North America and Europe, aviation forecasting is an important part of Met Éireann's work. In 2005, the service received payments of €7.8 million from the Eurocontrol air traffic control authority. Aviation weather offices are located at Casement Aerodrome, Cork Airport, Dublin Airport, Ireland West Airport and Shannon Airport.

As of 2016, the director of Met Éireann is Eoin Moran. According to the Met Éireann's annual report for 2005, the service had a budget of €20.6 million for that year.
