= Michael Flannan Littleton =

Irish chess player

Personal information
- Born: 5 March 1938 County Clare, Ireland
- Died: 21 August 2002 (aged 64)

Chess career
- Country: Ireland

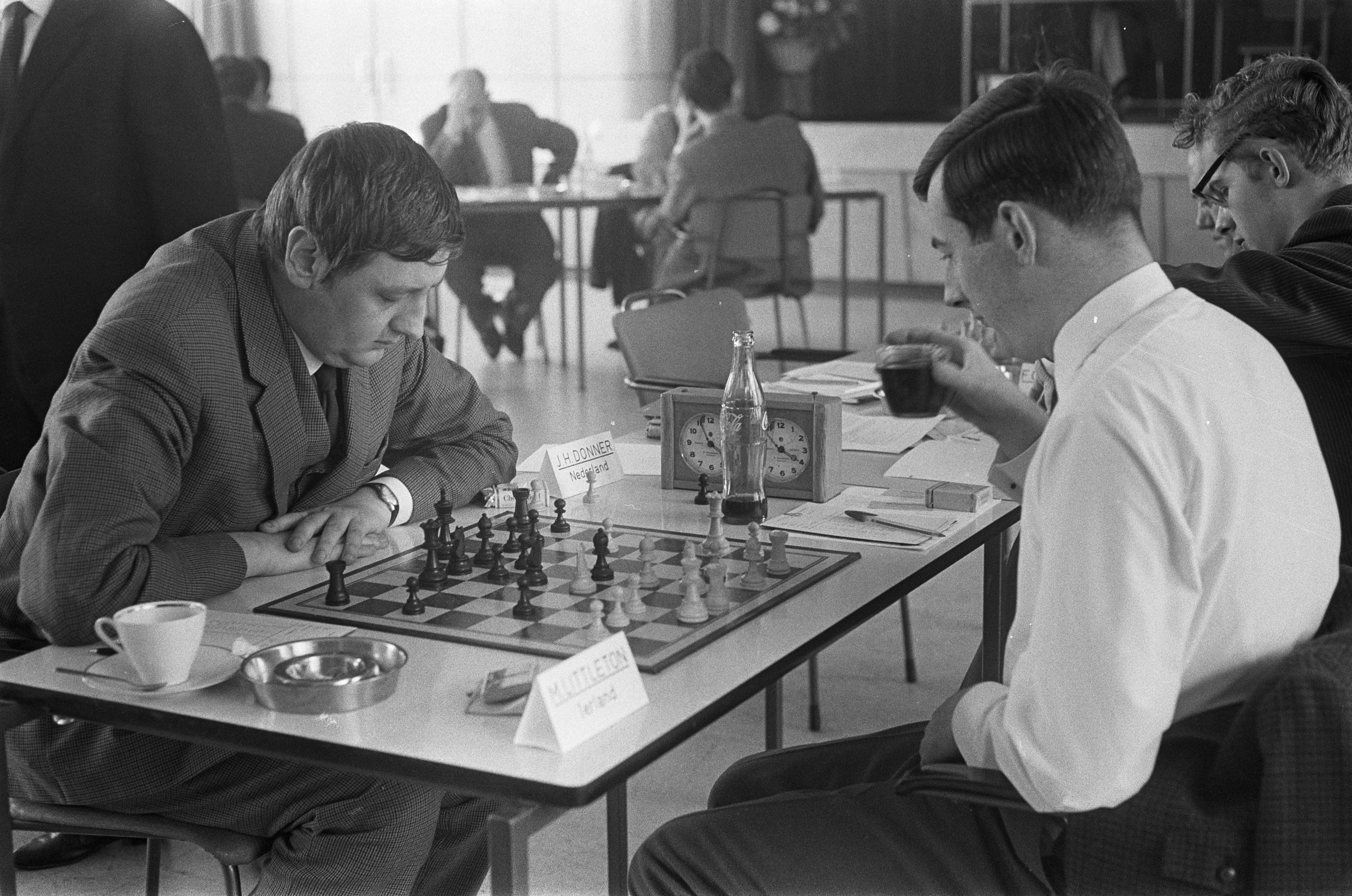
Jan Hein Donner vs. Michael Flannan Littleton, 1996

Michael Flannan Littleton (5 March 1938 – 21 August 2002) was an Irish chess player, two-times Irish Chess Championship winner (1962, 1965).

== Chess player career ==
From the begin of 1960s to the mid-1970s, Michael Flannan Littleton was one of Ireland's leading chess players. He twice won the Irish Chess Championship: 1962 (shared) and 1965. In 1966 in The Hague Michael Flannan Littleton participated in FIDE World Chess Championship European Zonal tournament and ranked in 17th place. In 1969 in Algarve he participated in FIDE World Chess Championship European Zonal tournament and shared 11th-14th place.

Michael Flannan Littleton played for Ireland in the Chess Olympiad:

- In 1960, at second board in the 14th Chess Olympiad in Leipzig (+3, =5, -11),
- In 1968, at second board in the 18th Chess Olympiad in Lugano (+3, =8, -4),
- In 1970, at first board in the 19th Chess Olympiad in Siegen (+0, =9, -3),
- In 1972, at third board in the 20th Chess Olympiad in Skopje (+7, =10, -1),
- In 1974, at second board in the 21st Chess Olympiad in Nice (+1, =8, -7).
