= John O'Hanlon (chess player) =

Irish chess player (1876–1960)

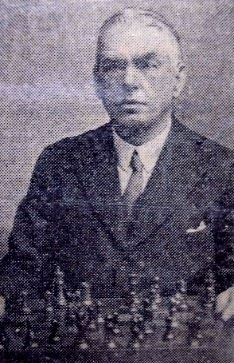

Personal information
- Born: 23 April 1876 Portadown, County Armagh
- Died: 20 February 1960 (aged 83) Dublin, Ireland

Chess career
- Country: Ireland

John O'Hanlon (23 April 1876 – 20 February 1960) was an Irish chess player. He won the Irish Chess Championship nine times, the first title in 1913 and the last in 1940. He competed in the Chess Olympiad three times, Paris in 1924, Warsaw in 1935 and Buenos Aires in 1939.

== Early and family life ==
John O'Hanlon was born on 23 April 1876, Portadown, County Armagh. O'Hanlon played many sports in his youth, competing in swimming and rowing events. He won trophies as an oarsman at regattas across Ireland. O'Hanlon was also a strong long-distance swimmer. He swam the distance between Greenore and Warrenpoint many times. He owned two public houses and the Queen's Hotel in Portadown before moving to Dublin in 1929.

His father, Felix, was born in 1829, and his mother Rosa, was born in 1851. He had a younger brother, William Joseph O’Hanlon, who was born in 1884. Felix was a spirit merchant. The O’Hanlon's were a wealthy family, they were wealthy enough to have at least one servant in their house when O'Hanlon was growing up, one of them was named Teresa. The entire family was able to read and write. O'Hanlon lived in Portadown for all of his childhood.

His wife Catherine Veronica O’Hanlon, was born in 1885, and they both lived in Portadown for some time until they moved to Dublin. O'Hanlon worked as a wine and spirit merchant as well as a chess player. In many news articles about O'Hanlon, his wife is only mentioned once. On 10 June 1922, O'Hanlon was one of several hundred people arrested by the government of Northern Ireland, for suspicion of being a member of an unlawful association or party. His wife Catherine had to write an affidavit stating that he was arrested on the 10 June and had since been detained without any charge being brought against him. Catherine and John were married for 53 years before his death on the 20 February 1960 in Dublin. They had no children.

== Chess career ==
O'Hanlon won the Irish chess championship nine times, first title in 1913 at the age of 37 and the last in 1940 at the age of 64. He competed in chess all around the world, but mainly in Europe. He also played in British championships; among others, he tied for 8th-9th places at Oxford in 1910 and 7th–9th at Stratford-upon-Avon in 1925, both won by Henry Ernest Atkins. In other tournaments, he shared first place with Max Euwe at Broadstairs in 1921, took 8th at the Hastings International Chess Congress in 1921/22 (Boris Kostić won), tied for 1st–3rd with Marcel Duchamp and Vitaly Halberstadt at Hyères in 1928, and took 12th at a tournament in Nice 1930 (Savielly Tartakower won).

O'Hanlon won the Tailteann Games on second and third occasions, in 1928 and 1932. He played for Ireland in unofficial and official Chess Olympiads in France at Paris 1924, Warsaw 1935 and Buenos Aires 1939. Just after the war, he won a prize at the Zaandam tournament in Holland in 1946. At the time of his passing, John O'Hanlon was preparing and practising his techniques with plans to make a comeback the following July.

== Legacy ==
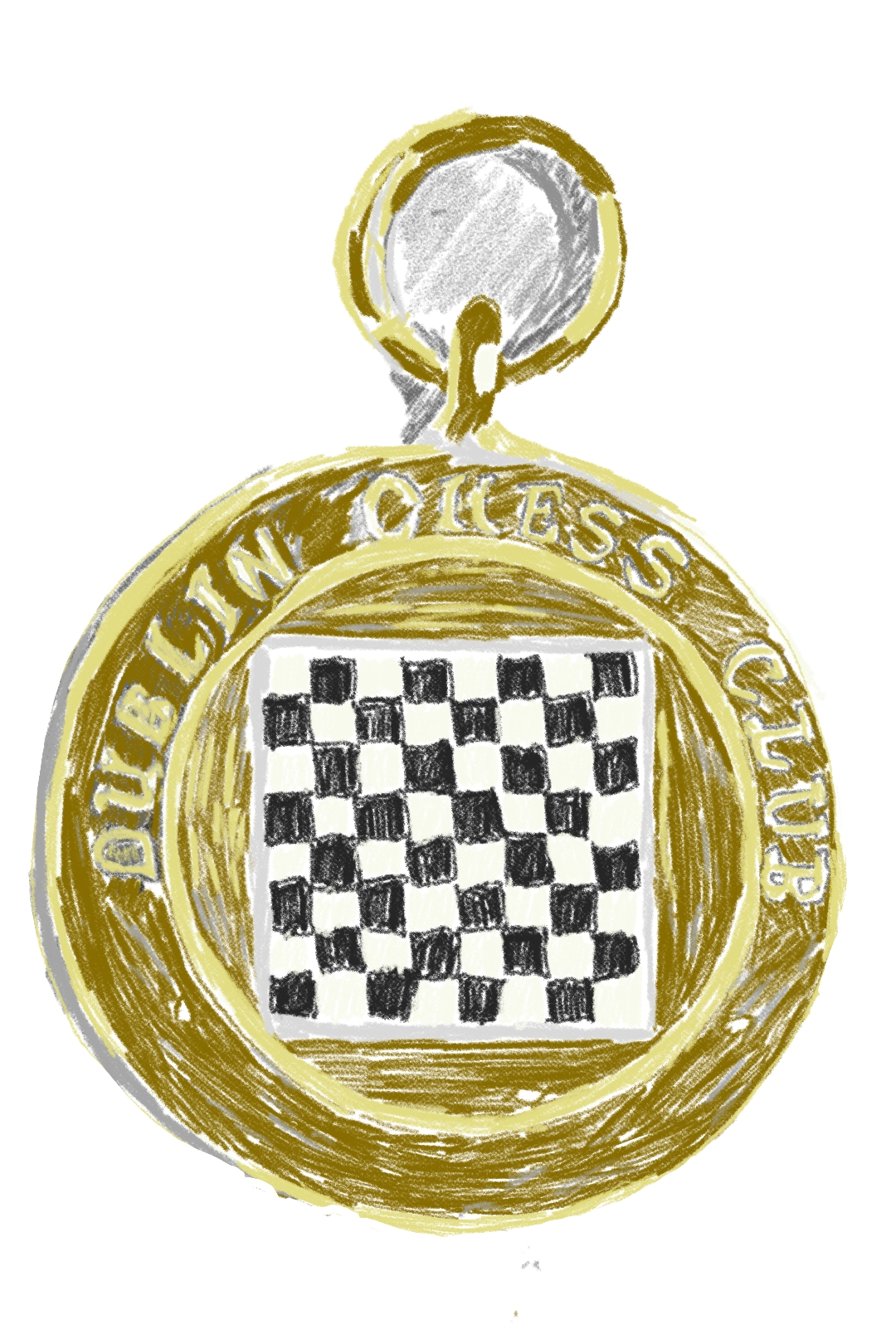
An impression of a medal won by John O'Hanlon (1943)

A collection of four medals won by O'Hanlon were sold at auction for one thousand euro by Fonsie Mealy auctioneers. The same lot was sold at Whytes auction for eight hundred and fifty euro. O'Hanlon was reputedly so well known in the chess world that from Moscow to Munich a disclosure of Irish Nationality would prompt the question "How is Mr. O’Hanlon?"

=== The O'Hanlon Cup ===
The O'Hanlon Cup, awarded for competitions in the fourth division of the Leinster Chess Leagues, is named in his honour. In the 1960s a group of visually impaired chess players formed the O'Hanlon Chess Club in Dublin, they competed in the Leinster Leagues, winning the O'Hanlon Cup, and progressing through the leagues, until 1967 when they disbanded.

The O’Hanlon cup was originally the third division but as a result of the introduction of the Heidenfield Trophy, which is now the second division, the O’Hanlon Cup became the fourth division. The trophy was used prior to the beginning of the league as a prize for a chess championship in Connacht, by the Irish Chess Union.

=== O'Hanlon Memorial tournament ===
For a number of years Dublin Chess Club, for which O'Hanlon has been a member, hosted the O'Hanlon Memorial tournament. In 1962 the O'Hanlon Memorial was held as part Irish Chess Union Golden Jubilee celebrations. This series of five tournaments in his memory were played at the Dublin Chess Club, where he had been a member. Five tournaments were played in J.J O’Hanlon's honour. They took place at the Dublin Chess Club. The first tournament took place in 1961 and the last concluded in 1964.

YEAR	DATES
1960	31 August – 12 October
1961	18 September – 13 November
1962	An international tournament, organised by the Irish Chess Union took place in 1962. This tournament was called the ICU Golden Jubilee and it incorporated the O’Hanlon Memorial. In September of the same year the Dublin Chess Club organised another O’Hanlon Memorial.
1963	2–30 September
1964	20 October- 1 November
