= Vincent Maher =

Irish chess player (born 1929)

Personal information
- Born: 27 January 1929 (age 97) Dublin, Ireland

Chess career
- Country: Ireland

Vincent Maher (born 27 January 1929), is an Irish chess player, two-times Irish Chess Championship winner (1950, 1955).

== Biography ==
Vincent Maher started played chess at age 13. From 1946 to 1952 he studied medicine at University College Dublin and won the Irish Universities Chess Championship three times during that period. He nine times participated in Irish Chess Championships: 1949, 1950, 1951, 1952, 1953, 1955, 1958, 1959, 1967, and won this tournament in 1950 and 1955.

Vincent Maher played for Ireland in the Chess Olympiads:

- In 1954, at third board in the 11th Chess Olympiad in Amsterdam (+4, =1, -11).
- In 1956, at first board in the 12th Chess Olympiad in Moscow (+1, =3, -10).

From 1956 Vincent Maher worked in British Army Medical Corps as medical officer. After returning from army he worked in Manchester. In 1961, Vincent Maher won the Manchester Chess Championship.
