= Thomas George Cranston =

Irish chess player

Personal information
- Born: 1877
- Died: 15 April 1954

Chess career
- Country: Ireland

Thomas George Cranston (1877 – 15 April 1954), was an Irish chess player, two-times Irish Chess Championship winner (1922, 1931).

== Biography ==
From the begin 1920s to the end of 1930s Thomas George Cranston was one of the strongest Irish chess players. He sixth times participated in Irish Chess Championships (1922, 1924, 1925, 1931, 1932, 1938) and two times won this tournament (1922, 1931).

Thomas George Cranston played for Ireland in the Chess Olympiad:

- In 1935, at fourth board in the 6th Chess Olympiad in Warsaw (+0, =3, -14).
