= Hilda Chater =

Irish chess player

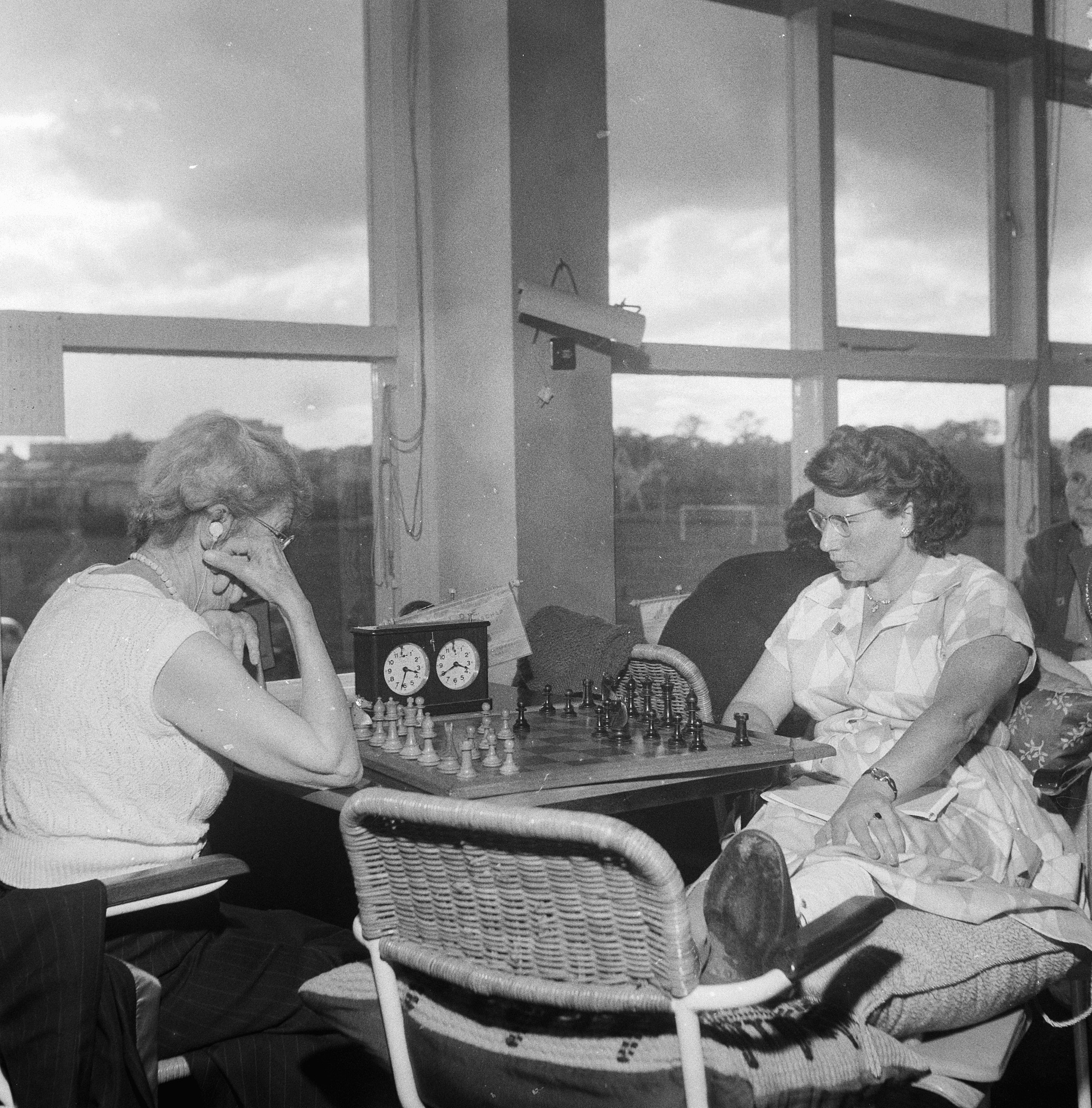
- Chater (left) vs. Fenny Heemskerk (1957)

Personal information
- Born: 28 August 1874 Leytonstone, England
- Died: 27 November 1968 (aged 94) St Albans, England

Chess career
- Country: Ireland, England

Hilda Florence Chater (28 August 1874 – 27 November 1968) was an English and Irish chess player, Irish Women's Chess Championship four-times winner.

== Biography ==
Hilda Chater was active in Cornwall chess in the 1920s and 1930s. She was a member of the Cornwall County Chess Association. Hilda Chater represented the Cornwall County in correspondence chess and over the board chess tournaments. In 1928 and 1929 she twice won premier Cornwall County individual chess tournament. In 1939 Hilda Chater first time participated in British Women's Chess Championship in which she played several more times. Her best result in British Women's Chess Championship was 4th place in 1951. In 1950 Hilda Chater went to live in Belfast. In 1954, she won first Irish Women's Chess Championship after playoff. Hilda Chater repeated this success three more times: 1954, 1955 and 1957. In 1957, in Emmen, at the age of 82, she represented Ireland at the first board in the 1st Women's Chess Olympiad. By this time she had become known as the Grand Old Lady of Chess. Unlike majority of the chess players who play best when young, Charter accomplished her most significant results while in late 70's - early 80's.
