= Donal Linehan =

Irish meteorologist

- Born: 16 November 1923; Cork, Ireland
- Died: 29 August 2006 (aged 82); Dublin
- Occupation: Meteorologist

Donal Linehan (16 November 1923 – 29 August 2006) was an Irish aviation meteorologist and fifth director of the Irish Meteorological Service.

== Life ==
Donal L. Linehan was born on 16 November 1923 in St Luke's, Cork. Linehan was schooled at Christian Brothers' College, Cork, where his father Dan Linehan taught physics and mathematics. He attended University College Cork, graduating in with BE civil engineering in 1944 and a BSc in 1945. He was heavily involved in athletes, particularly badminton, as well as winning both the Pierce Malone scholarship and the Peel Memorial Prize.

Linehan met his wife, Lauri Kenny, through badminton. They married in January 1959, and had two children: Paul and Kate. He was a keen bridge player, and served as president of the Howth Bridge Club. Linehan died on 29 August 2006.

== Career ==
Linehan was appointed to the Irish Meteorological Service (IMS) in March 1946, initially posted to Valentia Observatory. He then spent 20 years in Shannon Airport. In 1966, he was involved in setting up the forecast office at Cork Airport. He transferred back to Shannon as Office in Charge. Whilst in Shannon, he was involved in international civil aviation bodies such as the International Civil Aviation Organization. He moved to Dublin to work from the headquarters on O'Connell Street in 1975 to head the Central Analysis Forecast Office. Due to his degree in civil engineering, was heavily involved in the planning and construction of the new headquarters in Glasnevin with the architect, Liam McCormick. The building was constructed between 1975 and 1979. He was appointed assistant director to P. Kilian Rohan in 1978.

He was appointed director of the IMS in August 1981, taking over from Rohan. His assistant director was Ray Bates. During this period, Linehan advocated for the IMS against the austerity and cuts to the civil service during the 1980s, as well as restrictions on recruitment and overtime. The Service's observing programme was significantly reduced during the 1980s, which was somewhat offset by the introduction of automated weather stations and satellites. At this time, Linehan did caution the increased commercialisation of national weather services. During his tenure, the IMS became more involved in emerging Numerical Weather Prediction programmes. As well as his involvement in the World Meteorological Organisation and the European Centre for Medium-Range Weather Forecasting, Linehan was involved in the establishment of the European Meteorological Satellite Organisation (EUMETSAT).

Linehan oversaw the 50th anniversary celebrations of the IMS, which included the publication of a book on the history of the Service. He retired in November 1988, and was succeeded by Declan Murphy in 1989, the delay due to the embargo on public service recruitment at the time.
