= Terry Kelly (chess player) =

Irish chess player

Personal information
- Born: 1931
- Died: 19 June 2010 Toronto, Canada

Chess career
- Country: Ireland; Canada

Terence Christopher Kelly (April 1931 – 19 June 2010), was an Irish and Canadian chess player, Irish Chess Championship winner (1954).

== Biography ==
In the first half of the 1950s Terry Kelly was one of the strongest Irish chess players. He three times participated in Irish Chess Championships: 1953, 1954, 1955, and won this tournament in 1954. In 1955, Terry Kelly with chess club Eoghan Ruadh won Irish National Chess Club Championship.

Terry Kelly played for Ireland in the Chess Olympiad:

- In 1954, at second board in the 11th Chess Olympiad in Amsterdam (+0, =3, -14).

In the mid-1950s Terry Kelly moved to Canada, after which he did not participate in high-level chess tournaments.
