= Dublin Liberal Unionist Association =

Early 20th century political party in Ireland

Dublin Liberal Unionist Association was a grouping founded in Dublin Ireland in the early years of the twentieth century of Liberal supporters who supported the Union between Britain and Ireland. They supported Chamberlins Trade and Tariff policies. It supported Liberal Unionist figures in city politics, and candidates in the 1906 General Election. People involved in the Association included Major George Bernard O'Connor, Henry Forbes, the socialist John Lincoln Mahon and the barrister James Alexander Porterfield Rynd who acted as its chairman.
