= Hugh MacGrillen =

Irish chess player

Personal information
- Born: 1945
- Died: 10 January 2004

Chess career
- Country: Ireland

Hugh MacGrillen (1945 – 10 January 2004) was an Irish chess player, Irish Chess Championship winner (1973), Ulster Chess Championship winner (1964).

== Chess player career ==
From the end of 1960s to the mid-1970s, Hugh MacGrillen was one of Ireland's leading chess players. In 1964 he won the Ulster Chess Championship. In 1973 he won the Irish Chess Championship. After 1974, Hugh MacGrillen stopped participating in serious chess tournaments.

Hugh MacGrillen played for Ireland in the Chess Olympiad:

- In 1972, at second board in the 20th Chess Olympiad in Skopje (+4, =10, -5),
- In 1974, at first board in the 21st Chess Olympiad in Nice (+7, =6, -5).

Hugh MacGrillen played for Ireland in the World Student Team Chess Championships:

- In 1966, at first board in the 13th World Student Team Chess Championship in Örebro (+1, =4, -6),
- In 1968, at second board in the 15th World Student Team Chess Championship in Ybbs (+4, =8, -1),
- In 1969, at first board in the 16th World Student Team Chess Championship in Dresden (+2, =4, -2).
