= Chess Today =

First Internet-only daily chess newspaper

- Front page of the Chess Today newspaper
- Type: Daily Internet-only newspaper
- Format: E-mailed PDF file
- Owner: Alexander Baburin
- Editor: Graham Brown
- Founded: 7 November 2000; 25 years ago
- Headquarters: 3 Eagle Hill, Blackrock, County Dublin, Ireland.
- Country: Ireland
- Website: chesstoday.net

Chess Today was the first, and longest running, Internet-only daily chess newspaper, having continued virtually uninterrupted from 7 November 2000 through to December 2020. It was distributed to subscribers by e-mail. Each e-mail had the PDF of the newspaper attached, as well as a small collection of recent games. The editor and proprietor of Chess Today was Grandmaster Alexander Baburin. Each edition contained at least one tactical puzzle, an annotated game, and world chess news. Other elements of the publication included 'On This Day', endgame analysis and chess reviews. Chess Today also conducted and printed interviews with at least four former World Chess Champions.

== Editors and contributors ==
In addition to proprietor and editor Grandmaster Alexander Baburin, for much of the life of Chess Today Graham Brown was both web designer and editor and Ralph Marconi was the second editor. Some editorial work was also done by Tim Harding in the early years. A number of Masters and Grandmasters contributed either entire editions or contributions to editions of Chess Today including Grandmasters Mikhail Golubev, Andrei Deviatkin, and Ruslan Scherbakov, and International Masters Vladimir Barsky, Nikolai Vlassov, and Maxim Notkin. Grandmaster Karsten Müller also contributed endgame analysis to some of the early issues.

== Technical format ==
Chess today was sent to subscribers by e-mail. Every issue of Chess Today included three files in different formats. The PDF file contained the entire (printable) newspaper which varied in length but was generally 3–5 A4 pages in a two-column format. The games in each issue came in a CBV (Chessbase Format) file and were duplicated in a PGN file.

== Milestone editions ==
Edition	Date
Issue No. 1	Tuesday 7 November 2000
Issue No. 1000	Monday 4 August 2003
Issue No. 2000	Sunday, 30 April 2006
Issue No. 3000	Saturday 24 January 2009
Issue No. 4000	Friday, 21 October 2011
Issue No. 5000	Thursday, 17 July 2014
Issue No. 6000	Wednesday 12 April 2017
Issue No. 7000	Thursday 7 January 2020

== Circulation ==
Although Chess Today began with a relatively small readership (only 650 readers [including 40 Grandmasters] by the 1000th issue) its readership grew and for a number of years it was one of the main paid-for sources of chess news on the web often referred to as a source of material and point of reference by other authors. For example, many of the 'Move by Move' series of books (particularly those authored by Cyrus Lakdawala) cited 'Chess Today' in their bibliographies as an electronic resource. Originally planned to cost $15 every 4 months the price effectively increased slightly from €19 for 4 months in 2001 to €15 for 3 months.

== Origins ==
Chess Today was created by Alexander Baburin. He has related that he had the idea to create and run a daily Internet-only chess newspaper in the middle of 2000 while flying to Copenhagen. He has stated that he identified a gap in the market for paid-for daily chess news intended to inform, educate and entertain.

== Content ==
Chess today contained a mix of different articles, each edition included a selection from the following:

=== Test Yourself!/Tactical Quiz ===
This generally took examples of recent tournament and match games and set the reader the challenge of trying to find the tactical win available.

=== On This Day ===
This section was present in most editions. It included facts about well known chess players who were born or died on this date in previous years. It also noted other significant chess events that occurred on the same date in previous years.

=== World Chess News ===
This included news stories not only about chess tournaments and matches, but also the goings-on in FIDE and other chess organisations.

=== Annotated game ===
This section was present in every edition and included detailed annotations on a recent game between strong players (generally Grandmasters).

=== Chess reviews ===
This section generally included reviews of recently published chess books. Reviews were contributed by Sam Collins, Don Aldrich and Andy Ansel but there were reviews from other players too.

=== Endgame kaleidoscope ===
This was a speciality of Chess Today and usually involved Grandmaster Baburin investigating a topical or recent endgame or endgames in great detail, also making use of endgame tablebases (sometimes using ‘FinalGen’) and modern chess engines.

=== Web watch ===
This section offered readers updates on changes in the lay of the land in terms of the presence of chess on the Internet.

=== Beware: blunder! ===
This section gave examples of relatively or very strong players making mistakes and allowed readers to find improvements and understand the reason for the blunder.

=== Interviews ===
Occasionally Chess Today included interviews with Grandmasters and with other important individuals from the chess world. Some of the most notable interviews have been with Grandmasters Glek, Anand (five-time World Chess Champion), Svidler, Smyslov (former World Chess Champion), Spassky (former World Chess Champion) and Ponomariov (former FIDE World Chess Champion).
