= David Fitzsimons (chess player) =

Irish chess player (born 1991)

Personal information
- Born: June 17, 1991 (age 35) Dublin, Ireland

Chess career
- Country: Ireland
- Title: International Master (2018)
- Peak rating: 2416 (June 2015)

David Fitzsimons is an Irish chess player.

== Chess career ==
In October 2018, he played for Ireland in the 43rd Chess Olympiad, where he notably held a draw against grandmaster Dmitry Jakovenko in the second round.

In February 2020, he tied for second place with Elisabeth Pähtz, Keith Arkell, and Richard Bates in the Bunratty Masters, ultimately being ranked in third place.

In August 2024, he won the Irish Chess Championship with an unbeaten score of 7.5/9, half a point ahead of defending champion and grandmaster Alexander Baburin.

== Personal life ==
He is a teacher in the Glasnevin Educate Together National School.
