= John Moles =

English university lecturer

- Born: 22 September 1949
- Died: 4 October 2015 (aged 66)

John Moles (22 September 1949 – 4 October 2015) was Professor of Latin, a lecturer at Newcastle University and previously served as head of the classics department at Durham University.

Moles was the founder of Histos in 1997, an early example of on-line journal of ancient historiography. His first two published books were on chess, and he was twice the Ulster chess champion while at the Royal Belfast Academical Institution, going on to become the Irish Champion in 1966 and 1971, with the distinction of being a member of the Chess Olympiad team in 1970 and 1972.

In 2005, Moles was part of the expert panel on Cynicism for BBC Radio 4's In Our Time.

== Selected publications ==
- Plutarch; Moles, J L (1988), The Life of Cicero, Classical texts., Aris & Phillips, ISBN 9780856683619
- Moles, J L; Plutarch; University of Oxford. Faculty of Literae Humaniores (1979), A commentary on Plutarch's Brutus, University of Oxford, OCLC 230744072
- Moles, John; Wicker, Kevin (1979), French Winawer: Modern and Auxiliary Lines, Contemporary chess openings.; Batsford chess books., Batsford, ISBN 9780713420371
- Moles, John (1975), The French defence main line Winawer, Contemporary chess openings., B.T. Batsford, ISBN 9780713429213
