= Gurteen, County Tipperary =

Townland in County Tipperary, Ireland

Gurteen (An Goirtín in Irish) is a townland in the historical Barony of Ormond Lower, County Tipperary, Ireland. It is located west of the R438 road 2 km north of Ballygarry. It covers land in two civil parishes, Ballingarry and Loughkeen.

Met Éireann commissioned an automatic weather station in 2008 at Gurteen. It replaced an earlier station situated at Birr, County Offaly.

== Gurteen College ==
Gurteen College is an agricultural college providing training courses in agriculture and equine studies for farms and rural enterprises. It is a charity registered in Ireland.
