= Austen H. Nagle =

English meteorologist, active in Ireland and the United States

Austen Harold Nagle
- Nagle circa 1940
- Born: 1 November 1903; Birmingham, England
- Died: 2 September 1984 (aged 80); Washington, D.C., United States
- Occupation: Meteorologist

Austen Harold Nagle (1 November 1903-2 September 1984) was an English aeronautical meteorologist who served as the first director of the Irish Meteorological Service, and president of World Meteorological Organisation's Commission for Aeronautical Meteorology.

== Life and family ==
Austen Harold Nagle was born in Birmingham, England, on 1 November 1903. He attended Imperial College of Science and Technology, University of London, and was awarded an MSc.

Nagle lived in Dundrum while director of the IMS, and was remembered by staff for buying fish on Moore Street, who presumed it was for his pet cats.

His first marriage was to Rachel (Ruby) Chambers, with whom he had one daughter, Stephanie Yates. After Ruby's death in 1976, he married a second time to Olive. Nagle died in Washington on 2 September 1984.

== Career ==
From 1927 to 1938, Nagle worked for the British Meteorological Office (BMO) as Secretary of a Staff Association, and had a central role in the organisation of meteorological work of the Royal Navy. On 8 December 1936, he was appointed the first director of the newly founded Irish Meteorological Service (IMS). At the time, there was a requirement for Irish civil servants to be Irish citizens, but this was overcome by the BMO assuring the Irish government officials that Nagle's "paternal grandparents Irish born of pure Irish stock present Irish attachments family and social" and through a public interest clause was invoked to employ him as a non-national.

Prior to Nagle's appointment, all Irish weather forecasting was conducted by the BMO. At the time of his appointment in 1936, he had 3 staff based in 14-15 St Andrew's Street, Dublin, by 1946, the IMS had 241 staff. The first proposed name for the service was the "Meteorological Section, Transport and Marine Branch, Department of Industry and Commerce", but Nagle objected, arguing it implied a limited scope for the new service and should reflect general forecasting as well. The new service was initially knows as "Saorstát Meteorological Service". He went on to define the roles and responsibilities of the new organisation.

The initial immediate task for the IMS was to work from Foynes, and later other Irish airports, to provide weather forecasts for the emerging transatlantic aviation. In this capacity, Nagle attended international conferences of the International Meteorological Organization (later the World Meteorological Organization). In 1947, he was elected chair of the International Civil Aviation Organisation's weather meeting.

He remained in Ireland until 1948, when he took up a post with the US Weather Bureau in Washington, as an executive assistant to the chief of the Bureau, Francis Reichelderfer. He recommended Mariano Doporto as his replacement in the IMS. Brendan McWilliams noted that Nagle was remembered as "a tough and capable administrator". On his arrival in Washington, Walter J. Moxom director of the first region of the New York branch of the Weather Bureau described Nagle as "the most valuable man in international meteorology".

Nagle had hoped to be elected the first Secretary-General of the WMO, and he believed that being the US Weather Bureau would be a better sponsor than the IMS. He remained on the ballot until the final round, when he was defeated by David Arthur Davies, who had worked under Nagle in Foynes. In 1957, Nagle was appointed WMO representative to Commission for Aeronautical Meteorology and later serving as president. He retired from the Bureau in 1973.

He visited Ireland in June 1980 for the official opening of the new headquarters of the IMS in Glasnevin.

== Legacy ==
In September 2026, the Met Office, Met Éireann and KNMI announced their joint storm name list for the 2026-2027 season. The name Austen was chosen as the first entry in the (alphabetical) list in honour of Austen H. Nagle
