= Dorren O'Siochrú =

Irish chess player

Personal information
- Born: 1950 (age 75–76)

Chess career
- Country: Ireland

Dorren O'Siochrú (born 1950) is an Irish chess player, Irish Women's Chess Championship four-times winner (1968, 1972, 1973, 1976).

== Biography ==
In the early 1970s, Dorren O'Siochrú was one of Ireland's leading female chess players. She four times won Irish Women's Chess Championships: 1968, 1972, 1973, and 1976.

Dorren O'Siochrú played for Ireland in the Women's Chess Olympiads:

- In 1972, at first board in the 5th Chess Olympiad (women) in Skopje (+1, =4, -3),
- In 1974, at first board in the 6th Chess Olympiad (women) in Medellín (+2, =4, -4),
- In 1976, at second board in the 7th Chess Olympiad (women) in Haifa (+3, =6, -2).
