= Mark Heidenfeld =

Irish chess player (born 1968)

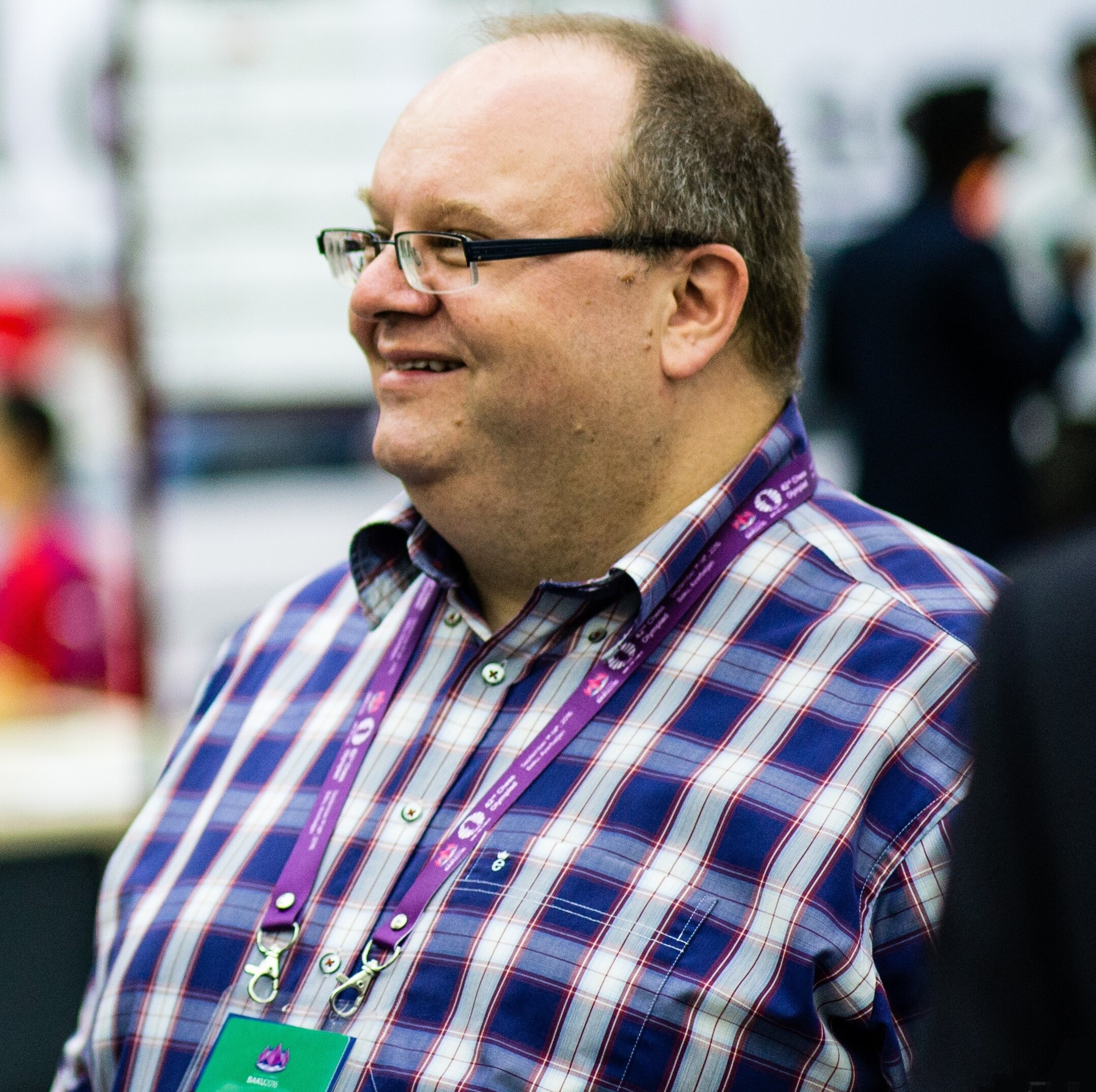
- Heidenfeld in 2016

Personal information
- Born: February 10, 1968 (age 58) Dublin, Ireland

Chess career
- Country: Ireland
- Title: International Master (1998)
- Peak rating: 2403 (April 2001)

Mark Heidenfeld is an Irish chess player.

== Chess career ==
He won the Irish Chess Championship in 2000 and 2021.

In March 2001, he held a simultaneous exhibition at the Malahide Chess Club, scoring 25.5/27.

In February 2014, he tied for 5th place with 5 other players at the Bunratty Chess Festival. He was the second highest finishing IM at the event.

== Personal life ==
He works as an IT consultant in Germany. His father was 6-time Irish Champion Wolfgang Heidenfeld.
