= Diana Mirza =

Irish chess player (born 2000)

Personal information
- Born: June 16, 2000 (age 26)

Chess career
- Country: Ireland
- Title: Woman FIDE Master (2017)
- Peak rating: 2031 (September 2025)

Diana Mirza (born 2000) is an Irish chess player. She began to play chess as a child and has played in many competitions. She became the first chess world champion in Ireland, and she is the only Irish person that has won a chess world title. Mirza has the chess titles of WFM, standing for Woman Fide Master, and National Instructor.

== Personal life ==
Mirza was born in Ireland to Romanian parents in 2000; her father Gabrile Mirza taught people how to play chess. Mirza began playing chess when she was five years old. While she was in primary school, she was taught by her father at the school where he was a teacher. When she was ten, Mirza won against her father at chess and he gave her €100. As Mirza became more proficient at chess, her father took her to competitions.

In 2017, Mirza said that she practices chess every day, and that there is much theory to learn in chess such as with opening moves. She also stated that memorising opening moves is important because a game of chess can be lost without that skill. To train, Mirza said that she exercises to keep up her chess stamina. She said that almost all of the chess tournaments that she participates in are not in Ireland because of a lack of funding in the country. Mirza's favorite chess player used to be Bobby Fischer, but she did not have one at the time of the 2017 interview. In 2020, Mirza said that she hopes the show The Queen's Gambit brings in more women chess players, and that she believes that sexism in chess is a major issue.

I have gotten a lot of comments from male players. I think every girl has. Even now, it's still sexist if you talk to the right people. They will say 'girls aren't as good' or 'she's just a girl, she can't play.' Sometimes I was the only girl playing in a room full of men. I thought I wasn't good enough, but now I know better and block it out.

— Diana Mirza

== Chess career ==
In 2017, at 17 years old, Mirza became the first chess world champion in Ireland, and she is the only Irish person that has won a chess world title.

Mirza has competed in four Women's Chess Olympiad, ten World Youth and Junior Championships, and other events throughout Europe while representing Ireland. Competitions that Mirza has won include the European Union Youth Championships in 2013, the Irish Women's Chess Championships that same year, and the U16 Irish Junior Championships in 2016, and the World Schools Under-17 Chess Championship. It took Mirza nine rounds over 10 days to win in the Under-17 Chess Championship. Ireland President Michael D. Higgins congratulated Mirza on her Under-17 win. Mirza won in the Women Irish Chess Championship in 2013 and the Table 1 women at the Norway Olympiad. She played at the Baku Olympiad in Azerbaijan.

Her chess titles are WFM, standing for Woman Fide Master, and National Instructor. The Irish Independent labeled Mirza as the "teenage chess queen" when she was 17 years old.
