= Patrick Brendan Kennedy =

Irish mathematician and chess player

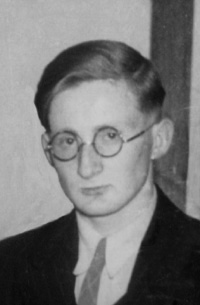
- Photo of Patrick Kennedy in 1949 by an unknown photographer
- Born: 20 July 1929; Clarecastle, County Clare, Ireland
- Died: 20 June 1966 (aged 36); Nottingham, England
- Parents: Pat Kennedy (father); Kit O'Sullivan (mother)

Notes
- Image used with permission of the ICU, found in: https://icu.ie/articles/50

Patrick Brendan Kennedy (20 July 1929 – 8 June 1966) was an Irish chess champion, and professor of mathematics, notable for his work in complex analysis.

== Early life, family, and personal life ==
Kennedy was the third child of Pat Kennedy and Kit O'Sullivan, his father, a master carpenter by trade, decided instead to join the police force in 1923, many on his mother's side were blacksmiths near Castlemaine. His parents moved to Ballylongford in 1936, and secured a transfer for Kennedy to attend the North Monastery secondary school in Cork.

Whilst at the North Monastery School, Kennedy won the Honan Scholarship to University College Cork, where in 1949 was awarded his Bachelor's degree in mathematics and mathematical physics. In the same year, Kennedy also took part in the Irish Chess Championship, and won 7 games out of 7, becoming the Irish chess Champion, he has been the only Irish Chess champion to win in such a way. After this, Kennedy was described as having a falling off in the quality of his play, and lost his title at the 1950 Championship.

In 1951, Kennedy completed his Master's degree, and was recommended by his examiner V. C. A. Ferraro, who at the time was a professor of applied mathematics at the University College of the South West at Exeter, to study for a Ph.D. with Walter Hayman at Exeter.

Kennedy's first paper was published in 1953, titled On a conjecture of Heins, which concerned a conjecture of Heins on subharmonic functions and gives positive results. That same year he was appointed as an assistant lecturer in mathematics at the University of Aberystwyth, and by 1954 he was awarded a Ph.D. by the National University of Ireland for his thesis Asymptotic Values on Integral Functions.

He married Pamela Fishwick in March 1954, and had three children, Anne Catherine Deirdre Kennedy, David Patrick Leslie Kennedy, and Jane C Deborah Kennedy.

Since Kennedy lived in Wales at the time, he had wanted to avoid national service for the English, and so took a lecturer position at University College Cork in 1954, his objectives were to modernise courses and raise standards, and his research output increased. Hayman characterises Kennedy's attitude to academic politics as "black and white", and Kennedy wasn't afraid to work hard both in his research and on committee to achieve productive outcomes.

In 1956, he was appointed professor of mathematics at Cork, and awarded the D.Sc. by the National University of Ireland in 1960, he was elected a Fellow of the Royal Irish Academy in 1962. He was appointed the first professor of mathematics at the University of York in 1962, which planned to open the next year. He worked at building the mathematics library and appointed staff to the mathematics department.

Kennedy took his life in 1966 on the night of 8 June; the coroner explained it was a combination of a psychiatric illness and added pressure of work, with his wife, Fishwick stating: "[He] set himself too high a standard and drove himself too hard".

== List of academic works ==
Walter Hayman, a prominent British mathematician and colleague of Kennedy, describes Kennedy's work as "extremely successful in all three fields in which he wrote. Kennedy collaborated with several of his peers in his papers, and was capable of constructing examples to his own and others results that were "simple although far from obvious". Kennedy's work can be broken into three fields:

=== Theory of functions of a complex variable ===
- "On a conjecture of Heins".
- "Conformal mapping of bounded domains".
- "A class of integral functions bounded on certain curves".
- With W. K. Hayman, "On the growth of multivalent functions ".
- "On a theorem of Hayman concerning quasibounded functions ".
- "A property of bounded regular functions ".
- "A problem on bounded analytic functions ".
- "On the derivative of a function of bounded characteristic".
- With J. B. Twomey, "Some properties of bounded univalent functions and related classes of functions".

=== Fourier series ===
- "Fourier series with gaps".
- "Fourier series with gaps. II".
- "Remark on a theorem of Zygmund".
- "On the coefficients in certain Fourier series".
- "A remark on continuity conditions".
- "Note on Fourier series with Hadamard gaps".

=== Tauberian theorems ===
- "Integrability theorems for power series".
- " A note on uniformly distributed sequences ".
- "General integrability theorems for power series".
- With P. Sziisz, " On a bounded increasing power series".
- "On a theorem of Sziisz".
