= Ulster Chess Championship =

The Ulster Chess Championship is an annual chess tournament organised by the Ulster Chess Union which has been held since 1892. It is currently open to all players who qualify as having been born in any of the 9 counties of Ulster. Nearly all Championships since 1982 have been played in Belfast. Among the winners in recent years have been two players, both also Irish Champions, who now have the title of International Master (IM), Mark Orr (4 times, most recently in 2001/02) and Brian Kelly (1994/95). Recent winners are

- Michael Waters (4 times)
- Stephen Scannell (8 times)
- Eugene O'Hare (6 times)
- Adrian Gillen (3 times)
- Tom Clarke (3 times)
- Michael Holmes (twice)
- Stephen Gillen (twice)
- David Houston (4 times)

Some winners have represented Ireland at chess Olympiads and European Team Chess Championship.

== Champions ==
=== Early Champions ===
- 1892 - E.A. Robinson
- 1893 - E.A. Robinson
- 1895 - Ernest Louis Harvey
- 1897 - William Steen
- 1899 - C.E. Smith
- 1902 - J. J. O'Hanlon

=== After 1932 ===
The Ulster Chess Union was founded in 1932 and relaunched the Ulster Championship.

- 1933 - William John Allen
- 1934 - W. J. Allen
- 1935 - P. J. (Joe) McMahon
- 1936 - J. Watson
- 1937 - R. Lennox
- 1938 - J. D. Peebles
- 1939 - William Minnis
- 1944 - A. L. Davies
- 1945 - William Minnis
- 1946 - R.A. Heaney
- 1947 - J.D. Peebles
- 1949 - J.A. Flood
- 1950 - G. A. Kearney
- 1951 - W. D. Kerr
- 1952 - Robert Jones
- 1953 - G. J. Boyd & W. D. Kerr
- 1954 - Douglas Eric Arnold Riley
- 1955 - R. A. Heaney
- 1956 - A. Torney
- 1957 - Jack Wrigley
- 1958 - G. J. Boyd
- 1959 - E. McGlinchey
- 1960 - Eugene O'Hare
- 1961 - E. O'Hare
- 1962 - H. Harte & E. O'Hare
- 1963 - E. O'Hare & Edward Whiteside
- 1964 - Hugh MacGrillen & E. O'Hare
- 1965 - John Larkin Moles & M. O'Leary
- 1966 - H. Boyd
- 1967 - J. L. Moles
- 1968 - M. O'Leary
- 1969 - E. O'Hare
- 1970 - F. Coll
- 1971 - John Nicholson
- 1972 - Ray Devenney
- 1973 - J. Nicholson
- 1974 - Adrain McDaid
- 1975 - P. Hadden & D. Harkin
- 1976 - J. Nicholson & E. Whiteside
- 1977 - J. Nicholson
- 1978 - Keith Allen
- 1979 - K. Allen
- 1980 - K. Allen, John Hegarty, John Kennedy & Derek McGill
- 1981 - James Quigley
- 1982 - David Houston & Michael Smyth
- 1983 - M. Smyth
- 1984 - M. Smyth & Tom Clarke
- 1985 - Mark Orr
- 1986 - K. Allen
- 1987 - Tom Brown & Niall Carton
- 1988 - K Allen, D. Houston & M. Orr
- 1989 - K. Allen & M. Orr
- 1990 - D. Houston
- 1991 - Diarmuid Simpson
- 1992 - Kieran Greer
- 1993 - Adrian Gillen
- 1994 - Stephen Gillen & K. Greer
- 1995 - S. Gillen & Brian Kelly
- 1996 - A. Gillen
- 1997 - A. Gillen
- 1998 - Michael Holmes & James McDonnell
- 1999 - J. McDonnell & Stephen Scannell
- 2000 - Timothy Douglas, M. Holmes & S. Scannell

=== Champions since 2000 ===
- 2001 - Stephen Scannell
- 2002 - Mark Orr IM
- 2003 - Tom Clarke
- 2004 - Stephen Scannell
- 2005 - Tom Clarke
- 2006 - Michael Waters & Stephen Scannell
- 2007 - Stephen Scannell
- 2008 - Stephen Scannell
- 2009 - Stephen Scannell
- 2010 - Michael Waters
- 2011 - Michael Waters
- 2012 - Michael Waters
- 2013 - Mike Redman
- 2014 - Gábor Horváth
- 2015 - Gábor Horváth
- 2016 - Stephen Rush (QUB)
- 2017 - Stephen Scannell
- 2018 - Thomas Donaldson
- 2019 - Daniil Zelenchuk
- 2020 - no championship due to covid
- 2021 - Thomas Donaldson
