= Mariano Doporto =

Basque physicist and meteorologist

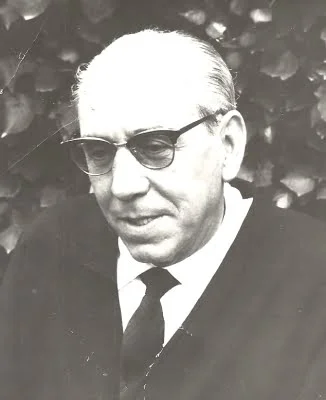
- Born: 18 January 1902; Cáceres, Spain
- Died: 8 September 1964 (aged 62); Dublin, Ireland
- Occupation: Meteorologist

Mariano Doporto Marchori (18 January 1902-8 September 1964) was a Basque physicist and meteorologist, and the second director of the Irish Meteorological Service.

== Early life ==
Born on 18 January 1902 in Cáceres, where his father worked as a state surveyor. He was orphaned as a child, and he and his siblings were sent to live with an uncle in Teruel. He moved to Madrid in 1918 to study science at the Central University of Madrid, specialising in physics, and began studying for a doctorate in physics in 1923 under the supervision of Eduard Fontserè. He married Mercedes Laguía Paracuellos in 1931. They had three sons, Mariano, Joseph Michael, and Marcial.

Between 1924 and 1927 he worked as a Meteorology Assistant at the Central Meteorological Office in Madrid. His early research is now viewed as a precursor to mesoscale meteorology.

== Career in Spain ==
Doporto became director of the Igueldo Meteorological Observatory, San Sebastián, in 1927. He was awarded his doctorate in experimental physics from the University of Barcelona in 1938, during the Spanish Civil War. During his time as director in San Sebastián, he oversaw technical modernisation of the Observatory, and published numerous papers in the publications he began there. He was appointed Head of the Network of Meteorological Ports for Aviation in Valencia in August 1937, but quickly transferred to Barcelona in October 1937, where he was appointed deputy head of the National Meteorological Service.

Doporto was initiated into Freemasonry in February 1925 at the La Mantuana Lodge, Madrid. He was a member of the Altuna Lodge No. 15 during his time in San Sebastián, where he was appointed to Master Mason by José Bellido Rodríguez, a founding member. He was also a founder and active member of the Spartacus Lodge, a lodge with anti-fascist ideals founded by members of the Labourd lodges L'Zelee, Etoile de Labourd, and Altuna, and based in Bayonne.

In 1939 towards the end of the Civil War, Doporto went into exile in Bayonne, where he was the director of a centre for Basque refugee children. He then escaped to Ireland ahead of the German invasion of France.

== Career in Ireland ==
In Ireland, he was appointed to the newly formed Irish Meteorological Service (IMS) in 1939, at the flying-boats station at Foynes, County Limerick. In 1948 he became the director of the IMS, on the recommendation of the previous director, Austen H. Nagle. After his appointment, he applied for and was granted Irish citizenship. Under his directorship, he expanded the number of meteorological stations, founded a centre of radioactive analysis, and initiated a programme researching long range weather forecasts. He was interested in making meteorology accessible to the public, and in 1948 the IMS began supplying weather forecasts to Radio Éireann, and then to newspapers in 1952. In 1961, the Central Analysis and Statistics Office (CAFO) was opened in Dublin to deal with this increased demand.

Doporto was a member of the Dublin Institute of Advanced Studies, and the Royal Irish Academy. He died in Dublin on 8 September 1964.
