= P. M. Austin Bourke =

Irish meteorologist and historian

Patrick Martin Austin Bourke
- Born: 10 May 1913; Dungarvan, County Waterford, Ireland
- Died: 1 August 1995 (aged 82); Dublin
- Occupation: Meteorologist

Patrick Martin Austin Bourke known as P. M. Austin Bourke (10 May 1913-1 August 1995) was an Irish meteorologist, agrometeorologist, historian, third director of the Irish Meteorological Service and world expert on potato blight. In the 1950s, he developed the "Irish rules", a method for forecasting the conditions for potato blight. A modified version of the rules are still in use today.

== Early life and education ==
Patrick Martin Austin Bourke was born in Dungarvan, County Waterford on 10 May 1913. His parents were Patrick M., stationmaster for the Great Southern and Western Railway, and Clare Bourke (née O'Sullivan). Bourke attended Mount Sion CBS in Waterford and University College Cork (UCC). While in UCC, he served as Student Union President and editor of the student newspaper. He graduated from UCC in 1933 with a BSc in mathematical science and won the Peel memorial prize. He went on to graduate with an MSc from the National University of Ireland (NUI) in 1937.

== Meteorological career ==
Bourke lectured in UCC from 1935 to 1938, before he joined the Irish Meteorological Service (IMS) at Foynes in 1939 as one of the first group of 7 meteorologist cadets recruited to the IMS. He was appointed officer in charge in 1944 at the Shannon and Dublin airports. He was appointed assistant director of the IMS in 1948. Following the sudden death of the director, Mariano Doporto, Bourke was appointed director in 1964, serving until his retirement in 1978.

Bourke developed an interest in agricultural meteorology, and developed a method to forecast potato blight which became known as the "Irish rules". He published this work as "The potato blight weather warning system in Ireland in 1952" in 1953. The forecast allowed the IMS to issue a blight warnings in Ireland, characterised by an unbroken spell of mild, humid weather. This work led to Bourke's appointment as chair of a commission with the World Meteorological Organisation (WMO) resulting in the publication of The forecasting from weather data of potato blight, and other plant diseases and pests (1955). From 1958 to 1962 he served as president of the WMO commission for agricultural meteorology. As director, he oversaw the creation of the Agricultural Meteorology Unit in the IMS in 1965. He also established four sites as part of the International Phenology Gardens programme, including at the Valentia Observatory.

From 1955 to 1956, he was an appointed advisor to the government of Chile following a potato blight epidemic in the country. This work led to his PhD thesis "The potato, blight, weather and the Irish famine" (1967), for which he was award as DSc as recommended by his external examiner, Kenneth Connell. The work was described as "awe-inspiring" by the economic historian Cormac Ó Gráda. The work is viewed as a pioneering, interdisciplinary approach, studying the administrative history as well as the potato itself, opening up new avenues for study of the period. He went on to publish widely in both historic and scientific journals, as well as articles for the Irish Times on the famine and the actions of Charles Trevelyan, who was responsible for facilitating the British Government's response to the Great Famine. In 1973 he was awarded a DSc from NUI, but returned it in protest after Ronald Regan was awarded an honorary degree in 1984 due to the actions of the United States in South America. Upon returning the DSc, he recited a rhyme during a radio interview explaining his action: "As I lay there in the gutter, Thinking thoughts I could not utter, I thought I heard a passing lady say, You can know the man who boozes, By the company he chooses, And with that the pig got up and walked away."

He was director during the planning and construction of the new IMS headquarters in Glasnevin. He suggested the proverb that was incorporated in the mural by Ruth Brandt in the lobby of the building.

Bourke retired in 1978, but continued to publish, including a collaboration with former colleague H. H. Lamb: The spread of potato blight in Europe in 1845–6 and the accompanying wind and weather patterns (1993). To mark his 80th birthday, a selection of his work was published under the title "The visitation of God"? The potato and the Irish famine (1993). Bourke argued against the idea that there was intent behind the policies which led to the devastation of the famine in Ireland, and decried the use of the word "genocide" calling it a "corroding canker of hatred".

=== Legacy and awards ===
He received numerous awards over his career including the bronze medal of the city of Pau, France in 1965, the William F. Peterson gold medal in 1975, and an honorary life membership, the vice-presidency, and the Butler medal of the Society of Irish Plant Pathologists in 1988. He sat on the editorial board of Agricultural Meteorology based in Amsterdam, and on the governing board of the Dublin Institute for Advanced Studies.

The Joint Working Group on Applied Agricultural Meteorology (AgMet), a group with representative from organisations and organised by Met Éireann, established the Austin Bourke medal in 2004. The first medal was presented to his wife, Clodagh, that year.

== Personal life and Chess ==
Bourke was a keen chess player, representing Ireland at the 6th Chess Olympiad in Warsaw, Poland, and was Irish Chess Championship in 1951. He married Clodagh Campbell in 1945, and they had 2 sons, Adrian and Austin, and a daughter, Iseult. They lived at 143 Ballymun Road. Bourke died on 1 August 1995, donating his body to science.
