= Trisha Kanyamarala =

Indian-Irish chess player (born 2005)

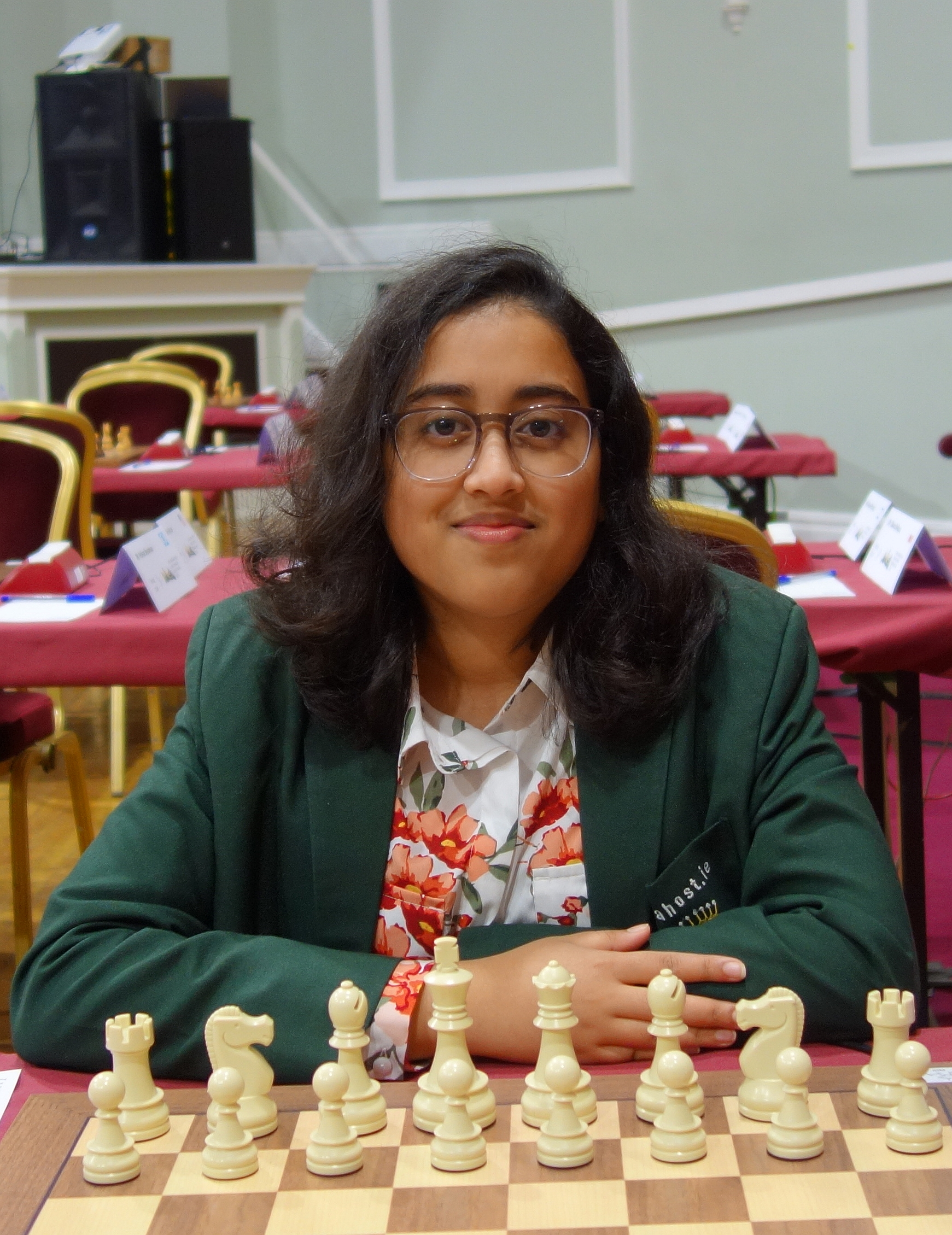

Personal information
- Born: 2005 (age 20–21) Hyderabad, India

Chess career
- Country: India (until 2017); Ireland (since 2017)
- Title: Woman Grandmaster (2026)
- Peak rating: 2344 (June 2023)

Trisha Kanyamarala is an Indian-Irish chess player. In January 2020, aged 14, she became Ireland's first Woman International Master. In 2025 she became Ireland's first Woman Grandmaster after earning her third norm in London.

== Biography ==
Originally from Hyderabad, Kanyamarala took up chess in 2014. She represented India until 2017 before switching to Ireland.

She is an Irish citizen and received a letter of appreciation from the President of Ireland, Michael D. Higgins, for her achievement of becoming Ireland's first Woman International Master. She was also a guest of the President of Ireland at a garden party in 2022 in Áras an Uachtaráin.

== Personal life ==
Her older brother is Tarun Kanyamarala.
