= Irish Chess Championship =

National event In various classes

The Irish Chess Championship is the national Championship of Ireland, currently run by the Irish Chess Union (ICU), the FIDE-recognised governing body for the game. Below is the list of champions. The first champion was J.A. Porterfield Rynd, who won the Dublin Chess Congress 1865 No. 3 Tournament, reserved for "amateurs, bona fide resident in Ireland for the 12 months prior to 1st September 1865".

The Irish Chess Association was founded in 1885. Its congresses of 1886 and 1889 included provision for determining the Irish Championship, and the winners were Richard Whieldon Barnett (later Sir Richard Barnett) and George D. Soffe, respectively.

The Hibernian Chess Association was established during the 1891–92 season, and held one Irish championship, in 1892, which was won by J.A. Porterfield Rynd.

Since its foundation in 1912 the Irish Chess Union has organised the Irish Chess Championships. The events ran sporadically at first, but have been held annually since 1924, except for suspension during 1941–45.

The Irish Chess Championship has run in various formats including a round robin competition, a match system, and a Swiss system competition. Since 2013, the championship has been organised as a 9-round Swiss event, open to players registered as IRL with FIDE, who meet a rating requirement.

== Winners ==
=== Men's champions ===
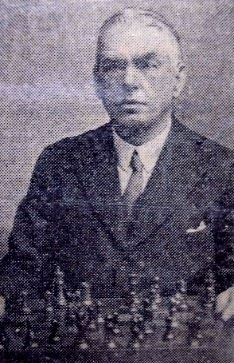
John O'Hanlon (1876–1960) won the championship nine times between 1913 and 1940.

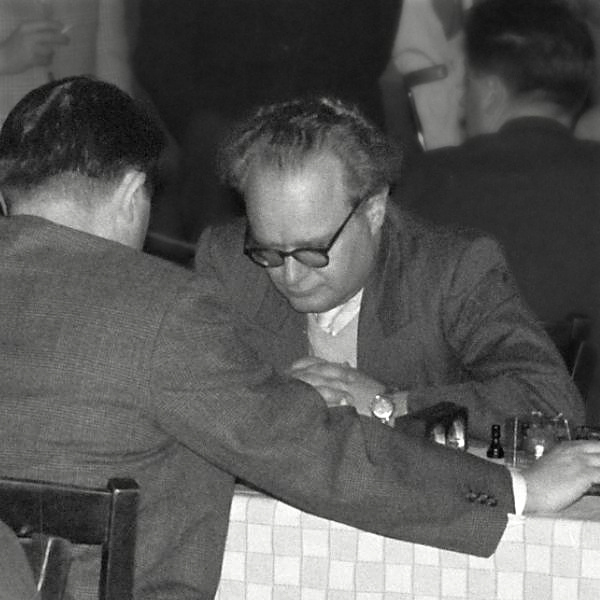
Six-time winner, Wolfgang Heidenfeld (1911–1981)

Year	Winner	Notes
1865	James Alexander Porterfield Rynd	First winner
1886	Richard Whieldon Barnett	
1889	George D. Soffe	
1892	James Alexander Porterfield Rynd	First person to win two championships
1913	John O'Hanlon	First person to win two consecutive championships
1915	John O'Hanlon	First person to win two consecutive championships
1922	T.G. (Thomas George) Cranston	
1924	Philip Baker	
1925	John O'Hanlon	First person to win three championships
1926	John O'Hanlon	First person to win four championships
1927	Philip Baker	First, and so far only, person to win three consecutive championships
1928	Philip Baker	First, and so far only, person to win three consecutive championships
1929	Philip Baker	First, and so far only, person to win three consecutive championships
1930	John O'Hanlon	First person to win five championships
1931	T.G. (Thomas George) Cranston	
1932	John O'Hanlon	First person to win six championships
1933	James C. Creevey	
1934	James C. Creevey	
1935	John O'Hanlon	First person to win seven championships
1936	John O'Hanlon	First person to win eight championships
1937	Thomas Cox	
1938	Thomas Cox	
1939	Bartholomew O'Sullivan	
1940	John O'Hanlon	First person to win nine championships
1946	Bartholomew O'Sullivan	
1947	Patrick A. Duignan	
1948	Dónal J. O'Sullivan	
1949	Patrick Brendan Kennedy	
1950	T. Vincent Maher	
1951	P. M. Austin Bourke	
1952	Michael Joseph Schuster	
1953	Edmund Noel Mulcahy	
1954	Terry Kelly	
1955	T. Vincent Maher	
1956	Dónal J. O'Sullivan	
1957	Dónal J. O'Sullivan	
1958	Wolfgang Heidenfeld	
1959	Brian Reilly	
1960	Brian Reilly	
1961	John Reid	
1962	John Reid / Michael F. Littleton	Shared title First shared title
1963	Wolfgang Heidenfeld	
1964	Wolfgang Heidenfeld	
1965	Michael F. Littleton	
1966	John L. Moles	
1967	Wolfgang Heidenfeld	
1968	Wolfgang Heidenfeld	
1969	Nicholas James Patterson	
1970	Paul Henry	
1971	John L. Moles	
1972	Wolfgang Heidenfeld	
1973	Hugh MacGrillen	
1974	Anthony Doyle	
1975	Eamon Keogh / Alan Templeton Ludgate	Shared title
1976	Bernard Kernan	
1977	Ray Devenney / Alan Templeton Ludgate	Shared title
1978	Alan Templeton Ludgate	
1979	David Dunne / Eamon Keogh	Shared title
1980	Paul Delaney	
1981	David Dunne / Philip Short	Shared title
1982	John Delaney	
1983	David Dunne	
1984	Eugene Curtin	
1985	Eugene Curtin / Mark Orr	Shared title
1986	John Delaney / Philip Short	Shared title
1987	John Delaney	
1988	Philip Short	
1989	Niall Carton	
1990	John Delaney	
1991	Stephen Brady	
1992	Stephen Brady	
1993	Niall Carton	
1994	Mark Orr	
1995	Brian Kelly	
1996	Richard O'Donovan	
1997	Joseph Diarmuid Ryan	
1998	Colm Daly	
1999	Colm Daly	
2000	Mark Heidenfeld	
2001	Stephen Brady	
2002	Sam Collins	
2003	Stephen Brady	
2004	Joseph Diarmuid Ryan	
2005	Colm Daly	
2006	Stephen Brady	
2007	Brian Kelly / Stephen Brady	Shared title
2008	Alexander Baburin	
2009	Colm Daly	
2010	Alex Lopez	
2011	Stephen Brady	
2012	Stephen Brady / Colm Daly	
2013	Colm Daly	
2014	Sam Collins	
2015	Stephen Brady / Philip Short	Shared title
2016	Stephen Jessel	
2017	Philip Short / Alex Lopez	Shared title
2018	Alex Lopez	
2019	Conor Murphy	
2020	Tom O'Gorman	
2021	Mark Heidenfeld	
2022	Tarun Kanyamarala	
2023	Alexander Baburin	
2024	David Fitzsimons	
2025	Kavin Venkatesan	

=== Women's champions ===
Hilda Chater (1st Women's Olympiad, Emmen 1957)

- 1953 Hilda F. Chater
- 1954 Hilda F. Chater
- 1955 Hilda F. Chater / Kay Doolan
- 1957 Hilda F. Chater
- 1968 Dorren O'Siochrú
- 1969 Catherine Byrne
- 1970 Elizabeth O'Shaughnessy
- 1971 Aileen Noonan / Cecile Meulien
- 1972 Dorren O'Siochrú
- 1973 Dorren O'Siochrú
- 1976 Dorren O'Siochrú
- 1977 Ann Teresa Delaney
- 1980 Suzanne Connolly / Ann Teresa Delaney
- 1982 Edel Quinn
- 2010 April Cronin
- 2012 Karina Kruk
- 2013 Diana Mirza
- 2014 Gearoidín Uí Laighleis
- 2015 Monika Gedvilaite
- 2016 Monika Gedvilaite
- 2017 Ioana Miller
- 2018 Ioana Miller
- 2019 Ioana Miller
- 2021 Alice O'Gorman
- 2022 Trisha Kanyamarala
- 2023 Antonina Gora
- 2024 Diana Mats

=== Senior / Veteran winners ===
- 1999 Andrew Thomson
- 2000 Jack Parker
- 2001 Andrew Thomson, Maurice Coveney
- 2002 Pat Loughrey, Maurice Coveney
- 2003 Maurice Coveney
- 2004 No information found
- 2005 Pat Loughrey
- 2006 Paul Cassidy, Colm Egan
- 2007 Paul Cassidy, Jack Killane
- 2008 Jack Killane, Paul Cassidy
- 2009 Paul Cassidy
- 2010 Colm Egan, Art Coldrick, Melvyn King
- 2011 Jack Killane
- 2012 Paul Cassidy
- 2013 Eamon Keogh / Jack Killane
- 2014 Pat Twomey / John Nicholson
- 2015 Tim Harding
- 2016 Eamon Keogh
