= Irish Chess Union =

Governing body for chess on the island of Ireland

- Abbreviation: ICU
- Formation: 1912
- Type: Sports organisation
- Legal status: Non-profit
- Headquarters: Dublin, Ireland
- Patron: President Michael D. Higgins
- Chairperson: Desmond Beatty
- Affiliations: FIDE (since 1933); European Chess Union
- Website: http://www.icu.ie/

The Irish Chess Union (ICU; Irish: Aontas Fichille na hÉireann) is the governing body for chess in Ireland (the Republic of Ireland and Northern Ireland) since its formation in 1912. ICU is a member of FIDE since 1933 and the European Chess Union. The ICU promotes chess in Ireland and maintains the chess rating for players registered with the ICU, which are published monthly. It runs competitions such as the Irish Chess Championship and selects teams to participate in international competitions for Ireland.

In 2005, in a dispute over fees, the Ulster Chess Union (UCU), which administers and develops chess in Northern Ireland, decided to end its affiliation with the Irish Chess Union, although the UCU accepted the ICU's continued organisation of the All-Ireland Championships. The UCU's application to affiliate to FIDE was rebuffed. In September 2018 the UCU re-affiliated to the ICU.

Leagues are held in the provinces, with the winning teams (and runners-up) playing off in the National Club Championships (although in recent years the Ulster leagues have not participated). The winning team and runners-up are entered into the European Club Championships.

== History ==
A book by Brian Nugent suggests that "The Irish Invented Chess". While little details of the game played are given, a game bearing the same name as the modern game in Irish, ficheall, was played by the Fianna, using fir fichille, or chess men as far back as the 10th century. The Pursuit of Diarmuid and Gráinne (Irish: Tóraíocht Dhiarmada agus Ghráinne), dating to at least the 16th-century and containing material from the 10th century, describes a game between Fionn and Oisín. At three times during the game, Oisín had a critical move to make but each time he was helped by Diarmuid, in the tree above him, dropping berries onto the right piece to move.

Chess has been played in Ireland since medieval times. Chess was played and groups met with different degrees of formality in Dublin in the 18th and 19th centuries. Among these early clubs were the Dublin Chess Club (from 1813 to 1819) and the Dublin Philidorian Chess Society (which was formed at the Harp Coffee House in Dublin in 1819). Before the establishment of the ICU in 1912, chess competitions in Ireland were run under organisations named the Irish Chess Association (formed in 1885), the Hibernia Chess Association, or various chess clubs. Thomas Long, who organised the 1865 Dublin Masters, was the first president/chairman of the Irish Chess Association. The Armstrong Cup, first played in 1888 as an "annual competition by the chess clubs of Dublin", is one of the longest-running chess competitions in the world.

== Publications ==
The ICU has previously published magazines, such as the Irish Chess Journal, for members of the association. In 2007, to reduce costs, this was curtailed to a biannual online magazine. Since 2009, no journal has been produced. Junior Chess Corner was a magazine/ezine produced in 2007 by the ICU aimed at juniors and beginners.

There have been a number of incarnations of the official magazine from the ICU, such as Ficheall/Irish Chess Magazine in the 1950s and Chess in Ireland in the 1960s.

== Team competitions ==
The Leinster Chess Union run the Leinster Chess Leagues. There are seven divisions, a number of them named after notable figures in Irish chess. The Armstrong Cup is sometimes described as the oldest perpetual chess trophy in the world, and has been played continually since 1888.

In the past, the O'Hanlon Cup, BEA and Bodley Cups had been divided into North and South sections. Although geographically in Connacht, Ballinasloe won the Bodley Cup in 2010 and 2011, the BEA Cup 2012, and the O'Hanlon Cup in 2014. Also, an Ulster club representing Cavan won the Leinster League BEA Cup in 1975 and 2011. The O'Connell Cup is a novice team competition that accommodates mainly Leinster teams but also includes teams from Cavan and Ballinasloe. The Leinster Chess Union also runs knockout team competitions, including the Branagan Cup, which take place after the team league competitions have finished.

The Ulster Chess Union run a number of team league competitions in Ulster for teams mainly in the Belfast area. The Belfast and District Leagues Division One play for the Ulster Trophy/Silver King, which has been played for since 1893. The all-Ulster league competition usually played in a variety of formats over the years so as to include sides from the rest of the province. The UCU also organise the individual Ulster Chess Championship for Ulster-born players.

== Junior chess ==
Underage/schools chess, provincial and all-Ireland competitions are held annually. The Leinster Schools Chess Association was established in 1942 to run leagues through the school term, and holding the provincial championships over the Christmas holidays. An all-Ireland schools competition is usually held during the Easter School Holidays. Chess events have also featured as part of the Community Games.

=== Glorney and Faber, Stokes and Robinson Cups ===
In 1948, a Dublin businessman, Cecil Parker Glorney, who was a competitive chess player and president of Rathmines Chess Club, created the Glorney Cup. The first competition was held in 1949. It was joined twenty years later by the Faber Cup later renamed to Jessica Gilbert Cup. These two events have been held annually and bring together national squads from across Europe (although it is mainly just between teams from Ireland, Scotland, Wales and England, sides from France, Holland and Belgium have competed) for three days of intensive and extremely competitive chess. The 2008 Glorney and Faber Cups took place in Liverpool as part of its City of Culture celebrations. Since 2011, under 12 (Stokes Cup) and under 14 (Robinson Cup) teams competed alongside their older compatriots. That year it was held at Dublin City University and organised by the Irish Chess Union. The 2015 tournament was held in Enfield, County Meath, and the opening ceremony was addressed by Irish President Michael D. Higgins (patron of the ICU).

== Affiliations ==
The Braille Chess Association of Ireland was established in 1985 to promote chess among the blind and partially sighted. The BCAI is affiliated to the International Braille Chess Association, the Irish Chess Union and National Council for the Blind of Ireland/Irish BlindSports. They hold the National Championships and organise teams and players for international Competitions.

Also affiliated to the Irish Chess Union is the Irish Correspondence Chess Association (ICCA) which is the 32-county governing body organising correspondence chess activities for Irish players living at home or abroad. A non-profit organisation, they run the national championship, Irish teams and other activities. The ICCA is affiliated to the International Correspondence Chess Federation (ICCF).
