= Colm Daly =

Irish chess player (born 1967)

Personal information
- Born: July 16, 1967 (age 59)

Chess career
- Country: Ireland
- Title: FIDE Master (1998)
- Peak rating: 2380 (April 2006)

Colm Daly is an Irish chess player and FIDE Master (FM).

He became Irish national champion six times, sometimes in a tie with another player, in 1998, 1999, 2005 (scoring 8/9), 2009, 2012 and 2013.

In September 2015, he won the City of Dublin tournament with 4 points in 5 rounds.
