= Brian Kelly (chess player) =

Irish chess player (born 1978)

Personal information
- Born: 3 November 1978 (age 47) York, England

Chess career
- Country: Ireland
- Title: International Master (1998)
- FIDE rating: 2480 (July 2026)
- Peak rating: 2504 (July 2005)

Brian Kelly (born 3 November 1978, in York, England) is an Irish chess player. Although born in England, he moved to Limerick, Republic of Ireland when he was 2 years old, and later to Belfast, Northern Ireland when he was 12. Both his parents hold Irish citizenship and he can compete with Ireland in international competitions.

== Chess career ==
He attained the title of International Master in 1998. His current FIDE rating is 2488, with the highest rating of 2504 achieved in July 2005.

Kelly won the Irish Chess Championship twice, outright in 1995 and jointly in 2007. In 1994, he won a gold medal at the Chess Olympiad playing on Board 6 for Ireland, as well as sharing first place in the Ulster Chess Championship.

As of September 2006, he was rated as the strongest native Irish chess player, although he was placed behind others such as Alexander McDonnell on the all-time list. He has captained both the Methodist College Belfast and Cambridge University teams during his career. He holds the record for the highest score earned by an Irish player in the British Chess Championship.

He is also a Go player, and has achieved the rank of second kyu whilst playing in the UK, making him one of the strongest Irish Go players.
