= James Creevey (chess player) =

Irish chess player

Personal information
- Born: 16 September 1873
- Died: February 1967

Chess career
- Country: Ireland

James C. Creevey (16 September 1873 – February 1967), was an Irish chess player, two-times Irish Chess Championship winner (1933, 1934).

== Biography ==
From the mid-1920s to the end of 1930s James Creevey was one of the strongest Irish chess players. He eight times participated in Irish Chess Championships (1925, 1926, 1928, 1929, 1933, 1934, 1935, 1938) and two times won this tournament (1933, 1934).

James Creevey played for Ireland in the Chess Olympiad:

- In 1935, at second board in the 6th Chess Olympiad in Warsaw (+1, =3, -10).
