= Alexander Baburin =

Russian-Irish chess grandmaster (born 1967)

Personal information
- Born: Aleksandr Yevgen'yevich Baburin; 19 February 1967 (age 59) Gorky, Soviet Union

Chess career
- Country: Soviet Union (until 1991); Russia (1991–1996); Ireland (since 1996)
- Title: Grandmaster (1996)
- Peak rating: 2600 (January 1998)
- Peak ranking: No. 70 (January 1998)

Alexander Evgenyevich Baburin (Russian: Александр Евгеньевич Бабурин, Aleksandr Yevgen'yevich Baburin; born 19 February 1967) is a Russian-Irish grandmaster of chess. He was born in Gorky, and has been living in Dublin, Ireland since 1993. He is editor-in-chief of the e-mail distributed chess newspaper Chess Today and is a coach and author.

== Chess career ==
Baburin became Irish champion in 2008, the first year in which he entered the competition. He cited past comments from fellow Irish players as the reason he had not entered previously. His participation in the Irish Olympiad team has generated some controversy, being non-native Irish. Baburin is known for giving talks about chess at many venues throughout Ireland. Baburin is currently Ireland's only chess grandmaster, a title he earned in 1996. Baburin is on the Irish chess team, the highest-ranked member. One of Baburin's most famous victories is against Veselin Topalov in a four on one simultaneous exhibition.

In 2000, Baburin tied for first place at the U.S. Masters Chess Championship.

In March 2022, Baburin won the John Bolger Cup in Dublin, edging out Vladyslav Larkin and Jacob Flynn on tie-break after all scored 4/5.
