= Leinster Chess Leagues =

Chess leagues in Leinster, Ireland

The Leinster Leagues are amateur chess team competitions run by the Leinster Chess Union (LCU) in the province of Leinster in Ireland. The competitions include the Armstrong Cup, which is reputed to be the oldest Irish team league competition. Played every year since 1888, the Armstrong Cup is one of the longest running chess leagues in the world.

== League structure ==
The leagues include a number of divisions, with promotion and relegation between divisions at the end of each season. As of the July 2023, the Leinster Leagues consisted of seven divisions:

- Division 1 - Armstrong Cup
- Division 2 - Heidenfeld Trophy
- Division 3 - Ennis Shield
- Division 4 - O'Hanlon Cup
- Division 5 - BEA Cup
- Division 6 - Bodley Cup
- Division 7 - O'Sullivan Cup

The LCU is affiliated to the Irish Chess Union (ICU).

== Knockout cups ==
The leagues normally start in late September and continue until early May. After this, clubs may put forward teams for three knockout competitions, from among players who played in the leagues. These competitions include the:

- Branagan Cup - for players from divisions 1 and 2
- Killane Shield - for players who played in divisions 3 and below
- William Brennan Trophy - for players rated below 1500
