= Methodist College Belfast =

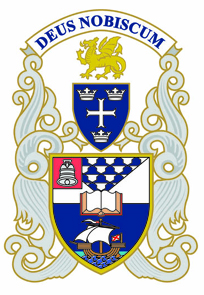

Location
- 1 Malone Road; Belfast, County Antrim, BT9 6BY; Northern Ireland; 54.5834°N 5.9402°W

Information
- Type: Voluntary grammar
- Motto: Latin: Deus Nobiscum; God with us
- Religious affiliation: Interdenominational (Christian Ethos)
- Established: 1865
- Founder: Methodist Church in Ireland
- Local authority: Education Authority
- Chair: Rev. Niall Johnston
- Principal: Jenny Lendrum
- Gender: Co-educational
- Age: 11 to 18
- Enrolment: ≈1,800
- Colours: Navy & white
- Publication: The MCB Magazine
- Alumni: Old Collegians
- Preparatory schools: Fullerton House; Downey House
- Nobel laureates: Ernest Walton
- Affiliation: HMC, ISC, ISBA
- Website: www.methody.org

Methodist College Belfast (MCB), locally known as Methody, is a co-educational voluntary grammar school in Belfast, located at the base of the Malone Road, Northern Ireland. It was founded in 1865 by the Methodist Church in Ireland and is a member of the Headmasters' and Headmistresses' Conference. It is also a member of the Independent Schools Council and the Governing Bodies Association.

In the 2023 The Sunday Times Parent Power Best UK Schools Guide, which ranks schools based on GCSE and GCE Advanced Level examination results the school placed 102nd in the UK and 19th in Northern Ireland.

In rugby union the school has won both the Ulster Schools Cup and the Medallion Shield a record 37 times outright. The college choirs have won Songs of Praise Choir of the Year, Sainsbury's Choir of the Year and RTÉ All-Island School Choir of the Year. The Chapel Choir has performed the Carnegie Hall as well as during Queen Elizabeth II's visit to the Republic of Ireland and the coronation of King Charles III and Queen Camilla in Westminster Abbey.

Past pupils of the college style themselves Old Collegians and the college has a former pupils' organisation known as Methody Collegians, which has branches across the world, including London, Hong Kong and Canada. The college has links with Belfast Harlequins, the successor of the former sports club for staff and past pupils, Collegians. Methodist College is a registered charity.

== History ==
=== Foundation ===
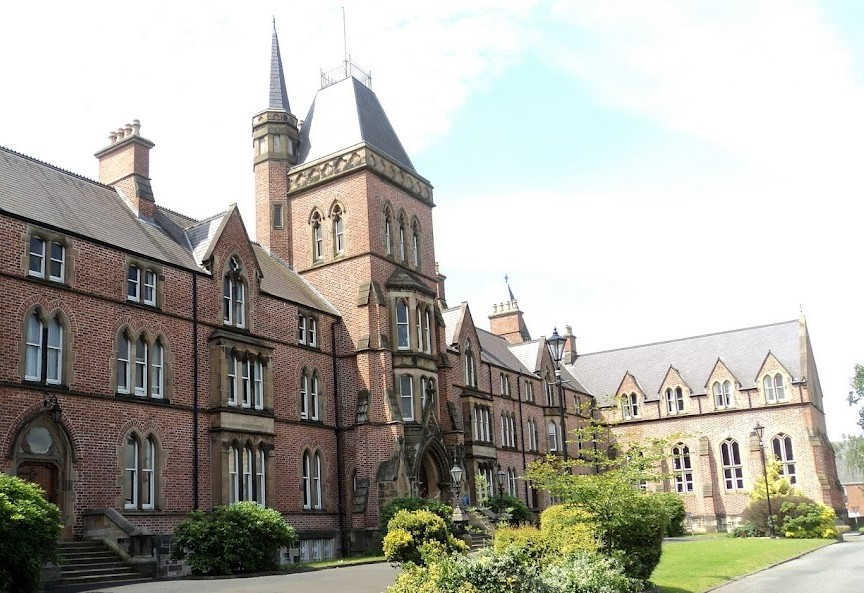
Methodist College Belfast – School House (A-Block)

Methodist College Belfast was founded in 1865 by the Methodist Church in Ireland and opened three years later in 1868. In 1844, the Conference of the Methodist Church in Ireland approved a proposal to establish a Methodist school in Belfast. Shortly after, a decision was taken to relocate the site of the school to Dublin. Funds for this school were raised in 1845 and it was opened the same year, first as the Wesleyan Connexional School and later to be called Wesley College after the founder of the Methodist religion, John Wesley.

It was only in 1855 that the idea was raised of founding a school specifically for the education of sons of ministers like the Methodist Church in England had at Kingswood School in Bath. Funds were raised with significant amounts coming from the United States and England. The original site for the school was to be in Portadown but the location was changed, first of all to Dublin. Land was acquired in Dublin but proceedings stalled. Several prominent Belfast Methodists began a campaign to have the school built in Belfast. The Methodist Conference allotted the remaining £2000 left from the purchase of the Dublin site to Belfast so long as they could raise £8000 extra with the added proviso that no building could take place until they had raised £10,000. A last attempt was made 1863 for the building to take place in Portadown but this failed. The necessary money had been raised by 1864 to satisfy the Conference's stipulations but it was held that £10,000 would not be sufficient. Further fundraising missions were made to the United States and England in 1866. These were led by Robinson Scott, Robert Wallace and William McArthur. Wallace would die on this mission in Cincinnati from cholera. However an additional £10,000 was raised. Several subsequent missions took place to fund building work.

The present site of the college, near Queen's University Belfast on the Malone Road, was purchased by James Carlisle and offered to the committee on the same terms. The site covered 15 acres all of which have been developed by the college to the present day. In addition to the school it was proposed that a strip on the North side be let for building and the rest used by the college. This would become College Gardens which is still owned by the college.

The school originally had a dual foundation as a school and a theological college and the school was designed with this in mind. The architects firm Joseph Fogerty & Son of Dublin won with their bid to design the school. The foundation stone for the Main Building was laid in 1865, and in 1868 the college was opened.

=== Early years ===
From the outset, the school catered for boarders and day pupils with accommodation. Although the school was founded as an all-boys institution, girls were very quickly included when ladies classes began. However, as they were strictly segregated from male pupils this put significant pressure on space. In the years that followed, wings were added to the main building. In 1877 a porter's lodge was built at the Lisburn Road end of College Gardens which was the only college building designed by notable Belfast architect Charles Lanyon. Also in this year, it was decided that no land would be let along the Lisburn Road.

Although originally conceived primarily as a school for the education of the children of Methodist ministers, the school styled itself as interdenominational from its inception.

While day classes had been provided for girls for the early years, there was no provision for the daughters of ministers to board. This was remedied by a gift from Sir William McArthur to found a hall of residence for girls. Building work on McArthur Hall was completed in 1891. The hall was designed by Sir Thomas Newenham Deane and his son Thomas Manly Deane.

No further major building work would take place until the 20th century but modifications were made to existing buildings including the creation of science labs.

=== Edwardian period ===
During the course of the First World War 428 pupils served in the armed forces and 80 were killed.

Further specialised rooms were built in 1919 including more labs, art rooms and classrooms. In an attempt to provide classroom space to a growing student population, the college purchased second-hand American Hospital Huts which were erected across the school in 1921. One of these huts remained in the college, between the Whitla Hall and the Drama Studio, until the early 2010s. The Marquess of Londonderry donated books to the college that were used in the school's Londonderry Library.

Around this time with the theological students gone and the Headmaster moved out of his rooms to College Gardens, the Main Building was remodelled to better accommodate boarders. Like other schools at the time, the boarders lived in "houses" but unlike other schools, rather than staying in the same house during their time there, they would move from house to house as they progressed through the school. The houses were Bedell House, Castlereagh House and Kelvin House and the boys would move up through them. They were named after two prominent Irishmen and one Englishman; Anglican clergyman William Bedell, born in Essex but dying in Cavan, statesman Robert Stewart, Viscount Castlereagh and scientist William Thomson, Lord Kelvin. There was also another house for day pupils named after Lord Wellington.

In 1932 the college purchased Pirrie Park from Harland and Wolff with the financial aid of William Fullerton and Hugh Turtle. It had already been partially developed by Harland and Wolff including the erection of a pavilion. The college began work to convert this pavilion into a preparatory school. It was called Downey House and named after John Downey, a benefactor to the college.

Following a bequest of £10,000 for a chapel, library or hall from a governor of the school, Sir William Whitla, the college completed the construction of the Whitla Hall in 1935.

Further modification were made to the science rooms in 1936 to bring them up to required standards.

=== World War Two ===
Due to governmental restrictions no significant building work took place in the college during the Second World War; this included maintenance. As a result, many buildings deteriorated, including the huts which were still being used as classrooms. In addition, McArthur Hall was rented to the Government for war use. 16 members of staff and over 1000 former pupils joined the reserve forces, including the Territorial Army and RNVSR and saw active service. 101 men were killed in the war. Unlike other city based schools, the governors at Methody decided against relocating outside the city. Adaptations were made to the college to provide additional protection to the school. The Main Building's Victorian basements were reinforced and campbeds and bunks installed. Fire escapes were added and a fire engine bought.

The college was unaffected by the Belfast Blitz in April 1941. After the evening of the first raid, the college offered the Whitla Hall as a refuge for people who had been left homeless and from the evening of the following day, people began to arrive. Food and beds were provided for the men, women and children until the women and children could be evacuated to the country and the men who needed to work in the city were moved into hostels.

Until the end of the war and food rationing, Pirrie Park was cultivated to grow crops along with raising hens and ducks.

=== Post-war Methody ===
With the passing of the Education Act (Northern Ireland) 1947 (c. 3 (N.I.)), all children over the age of 11 had to be enrolled in secondary education so creating the grammar school system as understood today with the selection taking place after the age of 11. This resulted in a large increase in the number of applications to institutions like Methody and the number of pupils increased significantly.

One of the houses in College Gardens fell vacant and was converted into a second preparatory department in 1950. It became known as Fullerton House, named after William Fullerton who had been a governor, chair of the board and founder of Downey House. Extensions to this were made to the adjacent house in 1957. The existing preparatory department, Downey House, also received extension works in 1954. In 1959 a boathouse for rowing was built at Lockview Road in Stranmillis.

Additional classrooms in what are now called K, L and M blocks were added as well as a lecture theatre, specific rooms for Home Economics; other classrooms (F Block), a canteen and gym were completed. In 1954 the Duchess of Kent, accompanied by Princess Alexandra, opened the college's extension.

=== Later 20th century ===
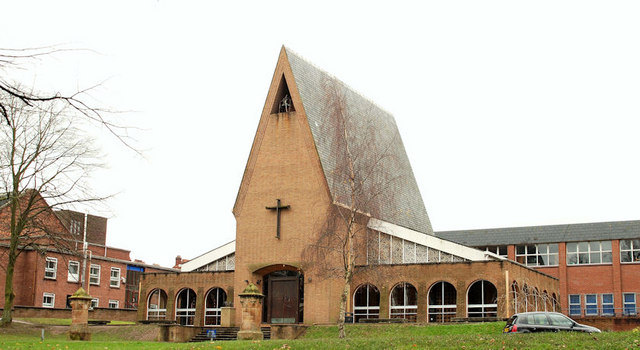
Methodist College Chapel of Unity

The later 20th century was a very turbulent time in Northern Irish history and became known as "The Troubles". While the Troubles touched nearly everyone in Northern Ireland, the school was thankfully materially unaffected. The 1960s and 1970s were a period of intense building work for the college, particularly in the run up to the centenary in 1968. This included new labs, modern language classrooms (E block), a new music department and indoor swimming pool, further science labs (now J and N blocks) and a gym. The science laboratories and swimming pool were opened by the Governor of Northern Ireland, Lord Erskine, in 1966. In 1968 the Chapel of Unity, Methody's first chapel on the college grounds, and a permanent memorial to the college's centenary, was completed. The organ in the chapel was donated by Corpus Christi College, Cambridge. The Prime Minister of Northern Ireland, Terence O'Neill, presented the prizes at the college's centenary prize day.

The Worrall Centre, a building specifically for the sixth form students, was completed in 1972. In 1975 Fullerton House was rehoused in its present position, facing the Lisburn Road and closing off the quad. The Sports Hall and art rooms were opened by Sir Roger Bannister in 1995.

The Walton Building, which included new science labs and computer suites, was also constructed in the early 1990s. This building was named after Methody alumnus Ernest Walton, who won the Nobel Prize in Physics for splitting the atom.

=== The new millennium ===
In 2005 the boathouse the college had been using was judged to be below standard and a new one was constructed on the same site. Further developments were made to sporting facilities when the David Wells Pavilion, named after the college's former director of Rugby, was opened at Pirrie Park.

In 2008 it was announced that the boarding departments in McArthur Hall and the Main Building would close in 2010, ending a 142-year history of boarding at Methody. The rooms will be converted into classrooms.

The college has been vocal in its opposition to the Burns Report into Post Primary Education in Northern Ireland. The college is one of the schools calling for the continuation of academic selection in Northern Ireland.

== The School Song ==
Latin words by R.M. Henry; music by F.H. Sawyer

Latin
1. (Solo) Omnes condiscipulos

confidenter oro,
celebrent Collegium
carmine canoro;
optimum pulcherrimum
ludum qui habemus,
hilari, laetissimo
cantu celebremus.

2. (Omnes) Situs in monticulo
callide delectus,
omnibus rivalibus
Invide conspectus,
omnibus fautoribus
solitus amari,
prohibet scientiae
lumen occultari.

3. (Omnes) Floreat Ultonia,
floreant Hiberni;
floreat Collegium
nominis aeterni.
Dumque cum laboribus
vitae concertamus,
semper in memoria
ludum habeamus.

English
1. (Solo) Confidently now I beg

scholars here before us,
celebrate our College with
tuneful praise and chorus;
best and fairest M.C.B.
honours still await thee:
now with joyful mirth and song
let us celebrate thee.

2. (All) Pile of beauty, fitly placed
on a site commanding,
thou, on whom thy rivals gaze
envious of thy standing,
whom thy sons regard with love,
fealty and affiance,
thou dost radiate afar
culture, art and science.

3. (All) Let our Ulster flourish well,
all the Irish flourish;
flourish our most famous school
which the arts doth nourish.
While we fight together the
toils of life that claim us,
let us ever keep in mind
Methody the famous.

== List of principals ==
- William Arthur (1868–1871) was president of the Methodist Conference in 1866.
- Robert Crook (1871–1873)
- Henry R. Parker (1879–1890). He left to become joint headmaster of Campbell College.
- Henry McIntosh (1890–1912).
- Ernest Isaac Lewis (1912–1917). Chemistry scholar and educationalist who devised the 'Bridge' course to introduce senior public school pupils to industry.
- John W. Henderson (1917–1943).
- John Falconer (1943–1948).
- Albert Ball FRSE (1948–1960). Ball was previously rector of the Royal High School, Edinburgh.
- Stanley Worrall (1961–1974). Worrall was previously principal of Sir Thomas Rich's School in Longlevens, Gloucester, England and became chairman of the Northern Ireland Headmasters' Association. The Worrall Sixth Form Centre was built in the modernist architectural style and named in his honour. A vorticist mural was painted on one interior wall of the centre's "rec floor".
- James Kincade (1974–1988). Kincade also served as the chairman and National Governor, Broadcasting Council for Northern Ireland.
- Thomas Wilfred Mulryne (1988–2005), a Methodist College alumnus, a Church of Ireland lay preacher and a classics graduate of St Catharine's College, Cambridge, taught at the college before being named Headmaster of the Royal School, Armagh in 1979. In 1998 he was awarded an honorary Doctorate of Education by the University of Ulster. Shortly after his retirement in 2005, he was awarded the Allianz Award for Services to Education in Ireland, along with a Distinction Award from the Belfast Institute of Further and Higher Education. He now sits on the Governing Bodies' Association (GBA) for schools.
- Cecilia Galloway (2005–2006). Former headmistress of the Royal Latin School, Buckinghamshire, she took up her post at Christmas 2005, the first female head of the school. In 2006, her management style was criticised and staff claimed that she had increased their workloads. She denied the claims, stating that her style was "democratic, transparent and straight-talking". On 20 October 2006, Galloway announced her resignation from Methody after just ten months, citing personal problems, and left her post ten days later, on 31 October 2006.
- Maureen P. White (acting) (2006–2007). Following Galloway's departure, White assumed the acting headship. She had joined the college as a modern languages teacher, and was senior vice-principal before taking the role of Acting Principal.
- Scott Naismith (2007–2022). Formerly of Regent House, Newtownards, Naismith was appointed by the governors in March 2007 and assumed office in the summer of that year, serving until his retirement in 2022.
- Jenny Lendrum (2022–). Previously principal of Antrim Grammar School, she was appointed to succeed Scott Naismith.

== Notable teachers ==
- John Anderson Hartley was second master at the college and was later Vice Chancellor of the University of Adelaide from 1893 to 1896.
- J. W. R. Campbell was a Methodist minister, President of Methodist College and dean of residences at Queen's University of Belfast. In 1921 he became a senator in the Parliament of Southern Ireland.
- James Johnston taught at Methody and later became Archdeacon of Gibraltar.
- David Bleakley was head of the department of economics and political studies at the college from 1969 to 1979. Prior to this he was a Northern Ireland Labour Party Stormont MP from 1958 to 1965. He became Minister for Community Relations in 1971 and a Member of the Northern Ireland Assembly in 1973.

== Academic achievement ==
The college is a grammar school, and therefore admits pupils using academic selection.

=== Public examination results ===
Methody's performance in public examinations is consistently far above both the Northern Ireland and the United Kingdom average.

In the 2017 A2 Levels, 16.0% of grades awarded were A*, 43.5% awarded were A*-A, and 76.3% awarded were A*-B, compared with the UK average of 8.3%, 26.3%, and 53.1% respectively. In the 2017 AS Levels, 33.2% of grades awarded were A, and 78.0% awarded were A-C, compared with the UK average of 23.8%, and 63.6% respectively.

In the 2017 GCSE examinations, 25.2% of grades awarded were A*, 57.9% awarded were A*-A, and 95.2% awarded were A*-C, compared with the UK average of 7.1%, 21.3%, and 65.3% respectively.

In the 2016 A2 Levels, 10.3% of grades awarded were A*, 42.7% awarded were A*-A, and 70.4% awarded were A*-B, compared with the UK average of 8.5%, 25.7%, and 50.9% respectively. In the 2016 AS Levels, 36.9% of grades awarded were A, and 84.6% awarded were A-C, compared with the UK average of 21.5%, and 60.9% respectively.

In the 2016 GCSE examinations, 22.6% of grades awarded were A*, 56.3% awarded were A*-A, and 96.6% awarded were A*-C, compared with the UK average of 6.5%, 20.5%, and 66.9% respectively.

In the 2015 A2 Levels, 15.0% of grades awarded were A*, 42.4% awarded were A*-A, and 72.1% awarded were A*-B, compared with the UK average of 8.2%, 25.9%, and 52.8% respectively. In the 2015 AS Levels, 33.6% of grades awarded were A, and 77.5% awarded were A-C, compared with the UK average of 20.2%, and 62.6% respectively.

In the 2015 GCSE examinations, 23.8% of grades awarded were A*, 55.3% awarded were A*-A, and 96.1% awarded were A*-C, compared with the UK average of 6.6%, 21.2%, and 69.0% respectively.

=== University places ===
In recent years, almost all sixth form leavers have proceeded to full-time education. The school routinely prepares pupils for places at top Russell Group universities in the UK, including University of Cambridge, University of Oxford, Imperial College London and University of Durham.

From the 2017 sixth form leavers, 84.7% of students proceeded to higher education, 2.0% went to further education, and 11.2% took a gap-year.

Methody is the NI hub school for the University of Cambridge higher education + programme and every year the school prepares students for both University of Cambridge and University of Oxford entry. The University of Cambridge student newspaper, Varsity, has previously listed Methodist College Belfast as one of the University of Cambridge's top ten feeder state schools.

== Music ==
=== Choirs and instrumental groups ===
There are five choirs in the college:

- Junior Choir
- Junior Singers
- Senior Choir
- Girls' Choir
- Chapel Choir

There are also several instrumental groups:

- Junior Orchestra
- Junior String Quartet
- Senior Orchestra
- The Band
- Jazz Band
- Irish Traditional Group
- Recorder Group

The choirs have won several competitions:

Year	Competition	Choir
1996	UTV School Choir of the Year	Girls' Choir
1998	UTV School Choir of the Year	Girls' Choir
1998	Sainsbury's Choir of the Year	Girls' Choir
2002	UTV School Choir of the Year	Girls' Choir
2002	Sainsbury's Choir of the Year	Girls' Choir
2004	Songs of Praise Choir of the Year	Chapel Choir
2004	UTV School Choir of the Year	Chapel Choir
2005	BBC Radio Three Children's Choir of the Year	Junior Choir
2009	RTÉ All-Island School Choir of the Year	Chapel Choir
2012	Youth Choir of the Year	Girls' Choir
2012	RTÉ All-Island School Choir of the Year	Girls' Choir

The Chapel Choir led worship at Westminster Abbey in 2002, 2004, 2006, 2008, 2013 and 2016 when the Abbey's own choir was on holiday, and has performed in several radio and television broadcasts, such as the BBC programme Songs of Praise. The choir was chosen as the only school choir from Europe to perform in the US premiere of Karl Jenkins's Gloria at Carnegie Hall in New York in 2011. The choir also performed at a reception at the British Embassy in Dublin during Queen Elizabeth's visit the same year.

Several members of the Girls' Choir sang at the official opening of the Millennium Dome in 1999 and performed alongside the Vienna Boys' Choir, in Vienna, in 2005 as part of the Fifth World Choral Festival. They were also among the choirs selected to sing at the coronation of Charles III and Camilla in 2023.

Several choir members have been accepted as choral scholars and organ scholars at Oxford and Cambridge colleges in recent years.

=== Senior Chorus ===
The Senior Chorus consisted of every pupil from Fourth Form to Upper Sixth; they performed choral works at some events throughout the year. The last performance of the Senior Chorus was at the 2014 Easter Concert, after which it was dissolved. The Chorus' duties have since been taken over by the smaller Senior Choir.

This tradition had been established over many years. When Henry Willis was Director of Music at Methody from 1957 to 1966, large scale choral works were undertaken by the Senior School, which continued under William McCay. Dr Joe McKee OBE was Director of Music from 1991 to 2002, and he arranged for the Senior Chorus to sing in public performances outside the college. With the Director of Music, Ruth McCartney MBE, the Senior Chorus learned one large-scale choral work each year, starting in September. The Senior Chorus performed on three occasions in the school year: Senior Prize Distribution, College Carols, and the Easter Concert. At the Senior Prize Distribution in October, they sang two movements from the choral work, as well as another popular tune. At the College Carols, in December, they sang two movements from the choral work, as well as a Christmas piece. The Easter Concert was the most important event in the Senior Chorus calendar; in the second half of the concert, they sang the entire choral work, followed by a popular tune. At Senior Prize Distribution and the College Carols, they were accompanied by the Senior Orchestra, and at the Easter Concert they were accompanied by the Easter Concert Orchestra, made up of some members of the Senior Orchestra along with other guests.

=== Musical events ===
The college holds several public musical events throughout the year. Senior Prize Distribution is held in October, in the Queen's University Belfast Sir William Whitla Hall and features performances from the Girls' Choir, Senior Choir, Senior Orchestra, Jazz Band, and the Band. The Autumn Concert then follows, normally held in a church or cathedral in Belfast, which features performances various musical groups. In December, a Service of Nine Lessons and Carols is held in the Chapel of Unity. This features several Christmas carols sung by the Chapel Choir, interspersed with Bible readings by pupils and staff. On the last day of the Winter term, College Carols is held in Fisherwick Presbyterian Church. The Easter Concert is the biggest musical event in the school year, and has been held in the main auditorium of the Waterfront Hall in recent years. The first half of the concert consists of performances by each of the college's music groups, and the second half of the concert features the Senior Choir & Orchestra performing a large-scale choral piece, followed by a popular piece of music. The light-hearted Band Concert is held in the Whitla Hall of the college near the end of the Summer Term. Every other June, there is a Summer Serenade held in a church in Belfast. The musical calendar ends with Junior Prize Distribution, which features performances from the Junior Choir, Junior Orchestra and the Band.

Philip Stopford's Missa Deus Nobiscum was commissioned to celebrate the school's 150th anniversary. Its first performance was in the Waterfront Hall, Belfast, on 14 March 2019, conducted by Ruth McCartney MBE.

== Sport ==
=== Rugby Club ===
The college 1st XV have won the Ulster Schools Cup a record 37 times outright, and the Medallion Shield a record 36 times outright. The college owns its own rugby pitches at Pirrie Park.

In 2014, the first XV defeated Sullivan Upper School 27–12 in the final of the Ulster Schools' Cup. In 2012, the Medallion XV defeated Wallace High School 10–7 in the final of the Medallion Shield.

In October 2009, the 1st XV won the invitational Blackrock Rugby Festival, organised by Blackrock College, Dublin a once off event to celebrate that school's 150-year anniversary.

=== Hockey Club ===
The school has played hockey since the 1890s. One of the earliest matches was when a Collegians ladies' team beat the schoolgirls 4–0 in 1896.

The college possesses its own artificial turf pitch, located at Belfast Harlequins on the Malone Road.

The boys' 1st XI were the Burney Cup winners in 1999 with the cup being presented to the team by Ulster Branch president and ex-pupil Peter Wood. In the 1985–86 school year, the Boys' 1st XI won the Tasmania Trophy as Irish schools champions, coached by schoolmasters Robert Kenny and Philip Marshall. The most recent success for the Boys' Hockey Club was the U14 XI winning the All Ireland Championship in 2015, along with the Ferris Cup and Bannister Bowl in 2014.

Many pupils have represented Ulster and Ireland at Junior and under age levels.

In January 2007, Boys' first XI player Douglas Montgomery was selected to represent the school as part of a delegation from Belfast Harlequins that met with President Mary McAleese in Phoenix Park, Dublin. This meeting was to mark the club's cross community work.

The girls club celebrated its centenary in 1996 with a series of special matches. The girls last won the Senior Schoolgirls Cup competition in 2016, beating Sullivan Upper School 1–0 in the final, with Katie Larmour scoring the only goal of the game. The school has the most wins in the history of the Cup, however most of the success came prior to World War II. The girls also won the Kate Russell All Ireland Championship in 2016.

=== Rowing Club ===
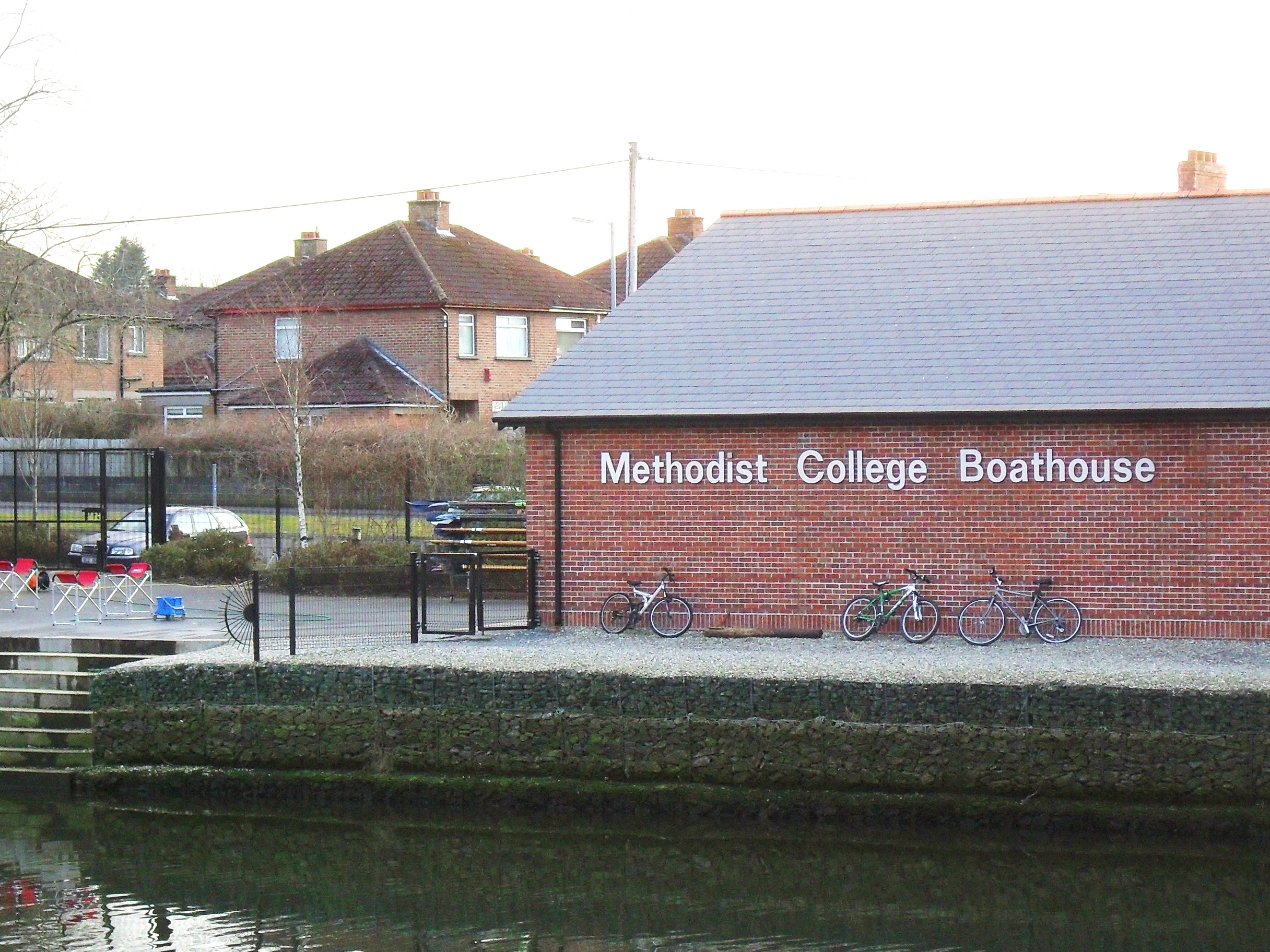
Methodist College Boathouse

Rowing has been part of the college for a long time, and the club has been very successful throughout its duration.

Every year the club enters in many events, including Head of the River Races on the local River Lagan, Erne River in Enniskillen and the club has even travelled to London to race the Schools' Head of the River Race on the River Thames.

The club is also very active during the summer months, competing at regattas such as Portadown, Neptune, Cork City and the college frequently brings crews down to Cork to race at the Irish Championships. In July 2017, a crew consisting of Alexander Wilson, Calum MacRae, Rory Eakin, James Kelly and cox Hannah Adams placed second in the coxed four, narrowly missing out on the gold to a superb Enniskillen crew, a tremendous result nevertheless.

In June 2018, the MCB J16 8 won the Craig Challenge Cup, a major rowing competition for clubs and schools. The event is the Ulster championship for Junior 16 eights with Methody being crowned victorious 16 times in its 59 years of running. Led by long standing coaches and teachers Mr Marron and Mr Forsythe, along with help from alumnus Mr Barr, a previous winner of the event in 2008, the club brought the cup back to the Lagan for the first time in 10 years on 9 June 2018, dethroning Enniskillen after their long string of wins, and beating crews from Bann Rowing Club, RBAI and Enniskillen Royal Grammar School.

Every year, Methody and their traditional rivals RBAI compete against each other on the Lagan in "The Race". "The Race" was rowed along with the Craig Cup in 2018.

== Clubs and societies ==
=== Model United Nations ===
There is a Model United Nations Society within the college. The college has won prizes at the Bath International Schools Model United Nations Conference, Model United Nations at Cheadle Hulme and George Watsons College Model United Nations. In 2003, a delegation of students went to Yale University, New Haven, to attend the Yale Model United Nations Conference. They won the overall best delegation award representing the United Kingdom. In 2005, a further delegation attended the North American Invitational Model United Nations Conference, hosted by Georgetown University in Washington, D.C. In March 2007 a team from MCB went to New York for the National High Schools Model United Nations. In March 2008, another MCB team attended GWCMUN at George Watson's College, Edinburgh. The team was successful in attaining the best delegation in General Assembly award, as well as jointly winning the best overall delegation award with a team from Hampstead School. A number of delegates also won individual awards. The college regularly sends delegations to the annual conference at its sister school, Wesley College.

=== Chess Club ===
Methodist College Chess Club was set up by Brian Thorpe and Arthur Willans in 1960. After Brian Thorpe's retirement in 1994, Dr Graham Murphy took over and presided over victory in both the Irish Colleges Chess Championship and the British Schools Chess Championship (sponsored at that time by The Times newspaper) in 1995. In addition to the outright victory in the British Schools Chess Championship in 1995, the college finished third in 1970 and 1979, and fourth in 1986 and 1997. The British Schools Championship Plate Competition for runners-up of the zonal heats was won in 1994, the first year the Plate competition was held.

The most distinguished former member is International Master Brian Kelly, who occupied Board 1 in the successful 1995 team. Kelly also won a gold medal at the Chess Olympiad in Moscow in 1994 playing at Board 5. Past pupils Brian Kerr, Tom Clarke, Angela Corry and Roger Beckett have also represented Ireland at Chess Olympiads. The Ulster Chess Championship has also been won by Methody alumni on 11 occasions, although only John Nicholson (1971,1973), Paul Hadden (1975), and Brian Kelly (1994) won whilst still at school. Brian Kelly is the only Methody alumnus to have won the Irish Chess Championship (in 1995 and 2007)—Tom Clarke having come close, but losing on Tiebreak.

== Preparatory departments ==
Methody has two fee-paying preparatory schools, Downey House and Fullerton House, each with 280 pupils, aged 5–11. Their fees for the 2017/2018 year were £4,730. There is a pre-school on both sites catering for children aged 3 and 4.

=== Fullerton House ===
There has been a preparatory department in the main buildings of the college since it opened in 1868. It received the name Fullerton House in 1951 after the late W.M. Fullerton DL who had chaired Methody's Board of Governors. The present building was opened in 1975 at the Lisburn Road end of the Methodist College campus. The first position however, was in the vestibule of 11 College Gardens, Belfast. Fullerton's motto is 'Veritate Principio'.

=== Downey House ===
Downey House was opened in 1933 following the purchase of Pirrie Park from Harland and Wolff, as the college playing fields. The existing buildings were modernised and extended. It was founded by William Fullerton and named after John Downey. Downey's uniform is traditionally different from the rest of Methody as its colours are royal blue and gold. The school's motto is 'Ad Augusta'.

== In film and literature ==
- The 2008 film, City of Ember, used the school and in particular the Whitla Hall as a filming location.
- In the 2008 adaptation of Cinderella in the BBC TV series Fairy Tales, starring Maxine Peake, the McArthur Hall was used as a filming location.
- In the 2008 film, Miss Conception, McArthur Hall is used as the setting for a nunnery.
- The 2011 novel Popular, and its 2012 sequel, The Immaculate Deception, by Gareth Russell are set in a fictional co-educational Belfast grammar school situated at the top of the Malone Road, based upon the college.
- Interior shots for the 2014 TV miniseries 37 Days were filmed in the college's McArthur Hall.
- The school was used as a location for the third series of the BBC children's TV series The Sparticle Mystery.
- In September 2015, the McArthur Hall was used as a location for the film adaptation of The Lost City of Z, starring Robert Pattinson.

== Notable alumni ==
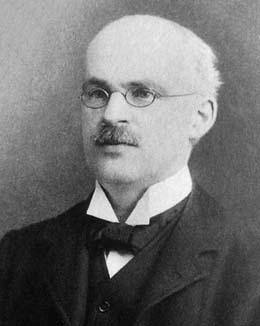
John Edward Campbell, mathematician

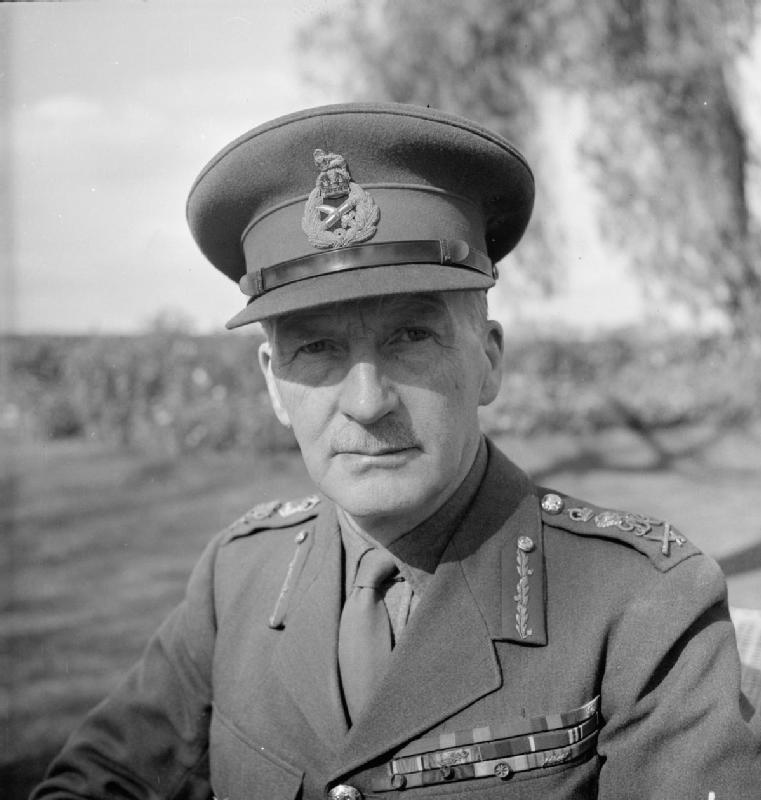
John Dill, Chief of the Imperial General Staff, World War II

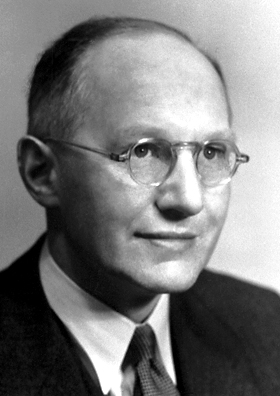
Ernest Walton, scientist and Nobel Laureate attended Methody in 1914

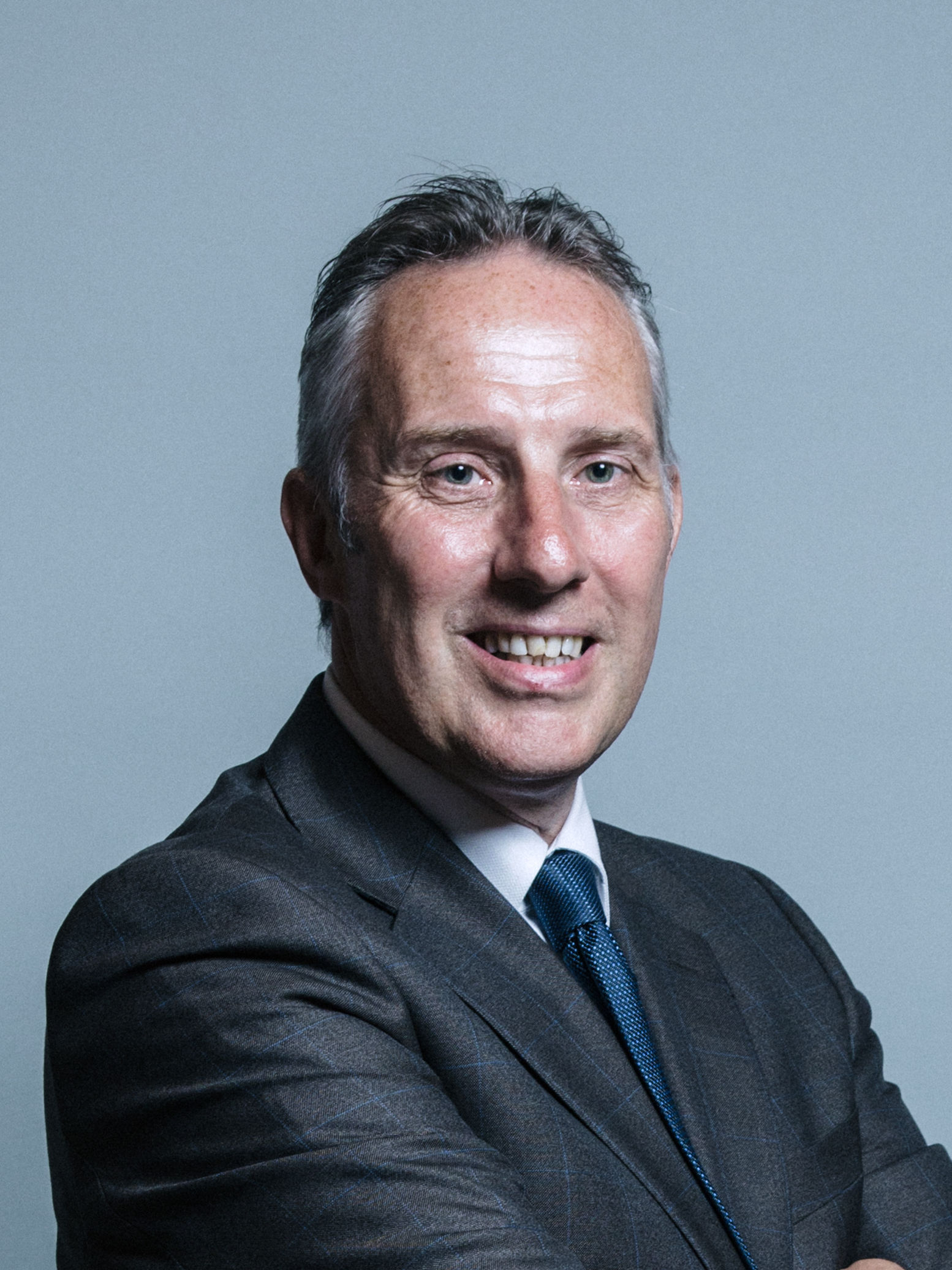
Ian Paisley Jr MP, Member of Parliament for North Antrim

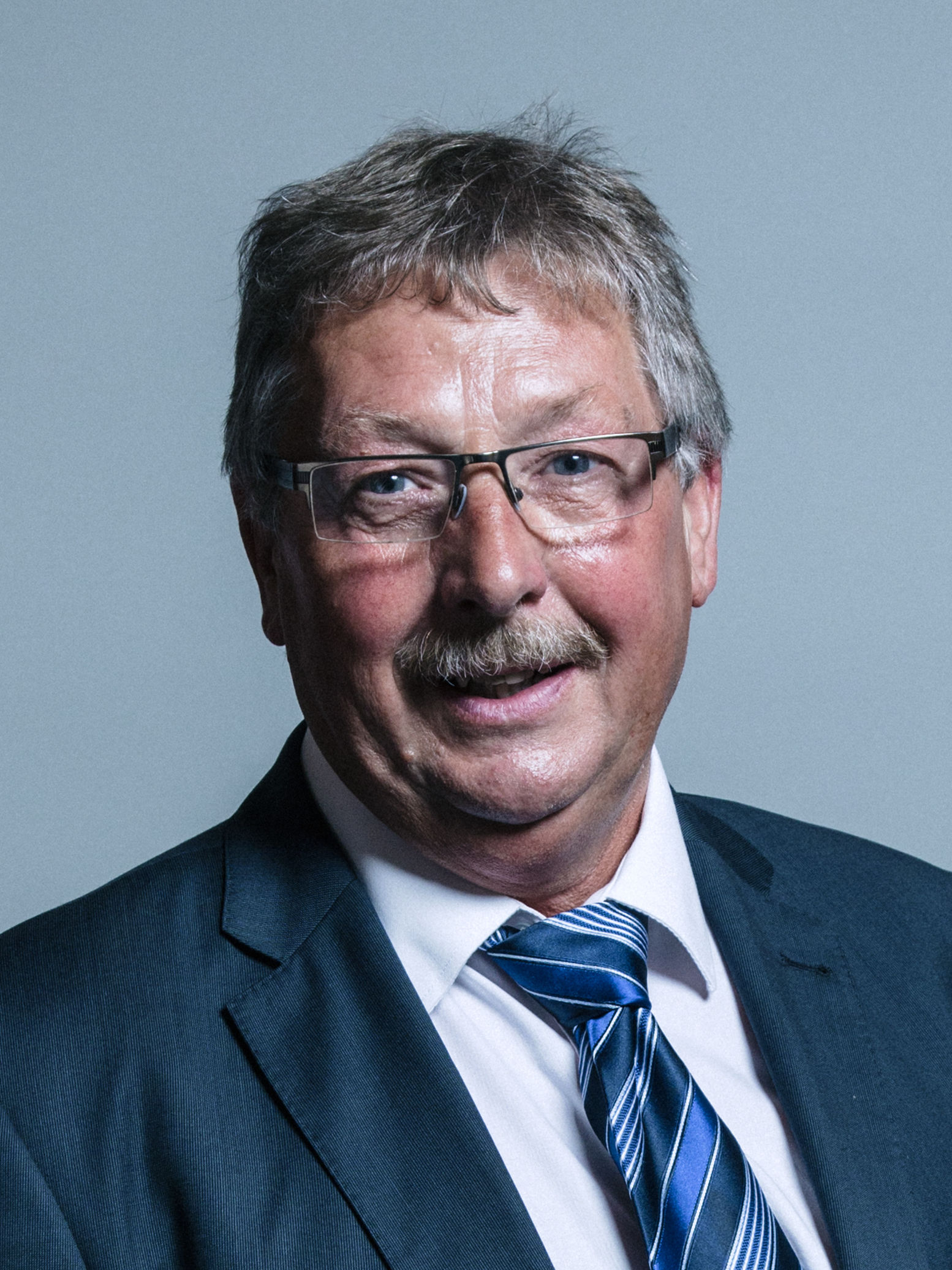
Sammy Wilson, Member of Parliament for East Antrim

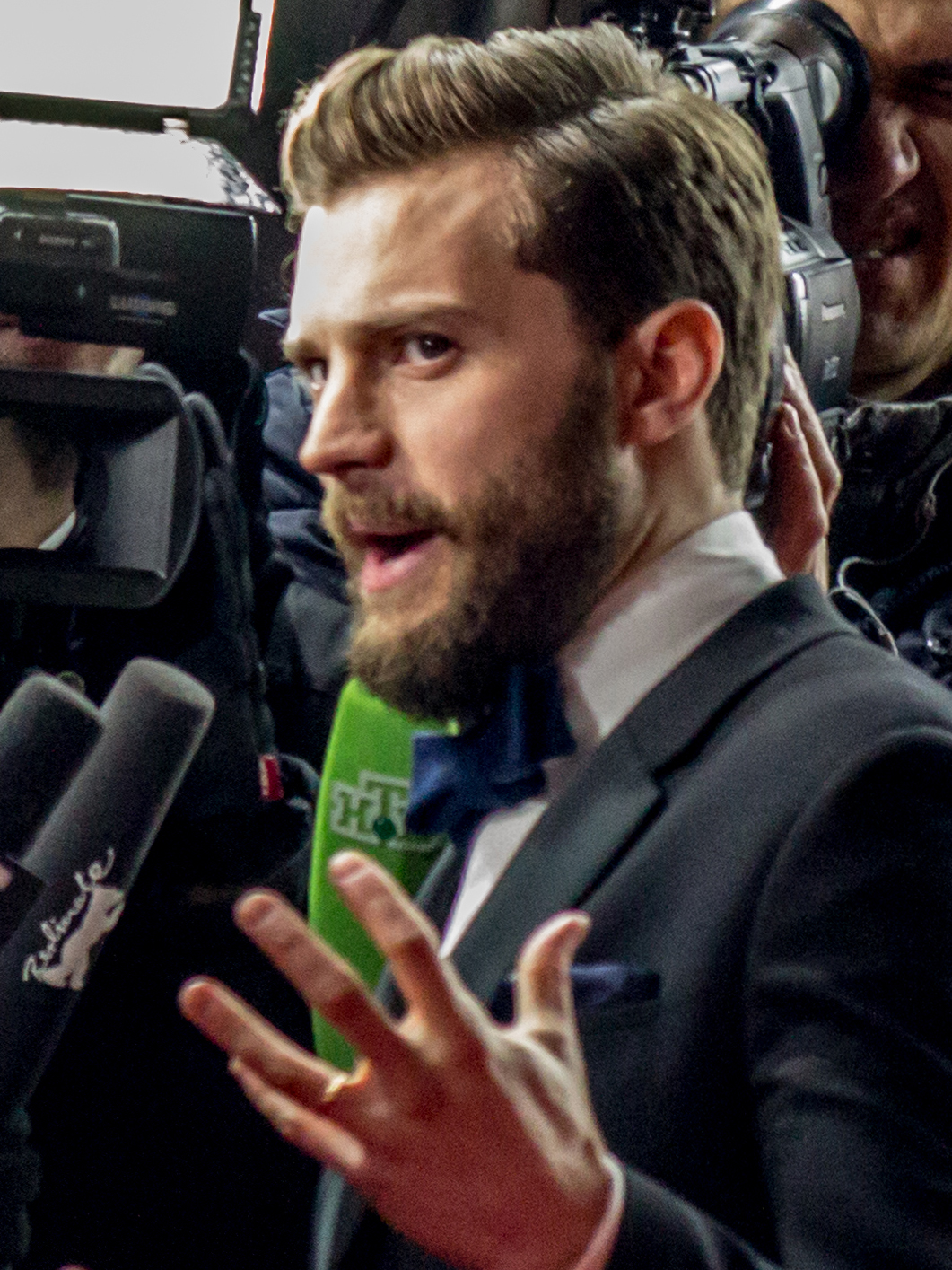
Jamie Dornan, model and actor

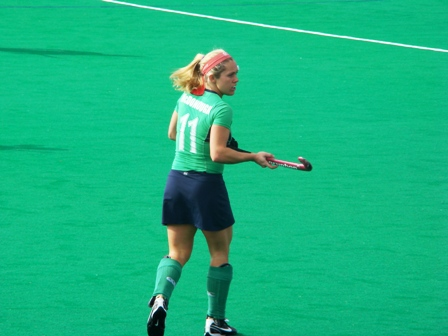
Jenny McDonough playing for Ireland against South Korea in the 2008 Women's Hockey Olympic Qualifier

Name	Born	Died	Description
John Edward Campbell	1862	1924	Mathematician, best known for his contribution to the Baker-Campbell-Hausdorff formula.
Alice Everett	1865	1949	Astronomer, engineer and pioneer in television development
Letitia Alice Walkington	1868	1918	The first woman to graduate with a degree of Bachelor of Laws in the United Kingdom
Alice Milligan	1865	1953	Irish nationalist and poet, member of the Gaelic League
Hiram Parkes Wilkinson	1866	1935	Judge of the High Court of Weihaiwei and British Crown Advocate in Shanghai
Frederick C. Alderdice	1871	1936	Last Prime Minister of Newfoundland
David Graham Shillington	1872	1944	Stormont MP for Armagh and Minister of Labour
William Black	1879	1967	Judge of the Supreme Court of Ireland
William Purdon	1881	1950	Honorary Surgeon to King George VI, rugby player for Ireland and Collegians and representative of the Government of Northern Ireland in London
John Dill	1881	1944	Chief of the Imperial General Staff, World War II
William Macneile Dixon	1886	1946	Author and academic
Edmund Warnock	1887	1972	Stormont MP for Belfast St Anne's and Minister of Home Affairs
Seán Lester	1888	1959	Irish Diplomat and the last Secretary General of the League of Nations, member of the Irish Republican Brotherhood
George Vance Allen	1894	1970	First Vice-Chancellor of the University of Malaya
William Abraham	1897	1980	Geologist and British Army officer
Ernest Walton	1903	1995	Scientist, winner of Nobel Prize in Physics, renowned for splitting the atom
Wilfrid Capper	1905	1998	Countryside campaigner
John Hewitt	1908	1987	Poet and socialist
William May	1909	1962	Minister of Education (Northern Ireland)
Jack Siggins	1909	1995	Rugby player and Manager, British and Irish Lions
John Herivel	1918	2011	Scientist and World War Two codebreaker at Bletchley Park
Robert Greacen	1920	2008	Dramatist, poet
Ewart Bell	1924	2001	Irish Rugby Union International; Permanent Secretary, Northern Ireland Office; President, Irish Rugby Football Union; Chair 1995 Rugby World Cup
Cecil Walker	1924	2007	Politician, Ulster Unionist Party MP for North Belfast (1983–2001)
Robert Joseph Gay Savage	1927	1998	Palaeontologist known as the United Kingdom's leading expert on fossil mammals
Basil McIvor	1928	2004	Minister for Community Relations and pioneer of integrated education.
James Ellis	1931	2014	Actor
Martin Smyth	1931		Politician, Ulster Unionist Party MP for South Belfast (1985–2005)
Bertha McDougall			Interim Commissioner for Victims and Survivors of the Troubles
Cedric Thornberry	1936	2014	Assistant-Secretary-General of the United Nations
Roy Beggs	1936		Politician, Ulster Unionist Party MP for East Antrim (1983–2005)
Robin Eames	1937		Church of Ireland Archbishop of Armagh (1986–2006), Bishop of Down and Dromore (1980–1986), Bishop of Derry and Raphoe, recipient of the Order of Merit
Joan Atkinson	1943		Athlete who competed in the Commonwealth Games
Roger Young	1943		Rugby Union player Ireland and British and Irish Lions
Gerald Home	1950	2021	Actor
Alan Green	1952		Broadcaster, BBC Radio 5 Live Football commentator
Keith Jeffery	1952	2016	Irish historical scholar and Historian of Secret Intelligence Service (MI6)
Stephen Irwin	1953		High Court Judge 2006-2016 and Lord Justice of Appeal 2016–2020. Chair of the Independent Expert Panel of the House of Commons, 2020-
Sammy Wilson	1953		Politician, 31st and 45th Lord Mayor of Belfast, Northern Ireland Minister for Finance (2009–2013), Minister of the Environment (2008–2009), Democratic Unionist Party MLA for East Belfast (1998–2003), DUP MLA for East Antrim (2003–2015) and DUP MP for East Antrim (2005–).
Alister McGrath	1953		Theologian and Professor of Science & Religion at the University of Oxford
Julian Simmons			Local celebrity and UTV continuity announcer
Peter Waterworth	1957		Lawyer and diplomat; Governor of Montserrat (2007–2011)
Chris Barrie	1960		Actor and comedian
Pat Storey	1960		The first woman Anglican bishop in Ireland and Great Britain
Barry Douglas	1960		Concert pianist
Glenn Patterson	1961		Author and novelist
Andy White	1962		Musician and songwriter
Caron Keating	1962	2004	Television presenter
Peter McDonald	1962		Critic, author and university lecturer
Tim Phillips	1964		Political strategist and author
Ian Paisley Jr	1966		Politician, Junior Minister in the Office of the First Minister and deputy First Minister of Northern Ireland (2007–2008), Democratic Unionist Party MP for North Antrim (2010–) and Member of the Northern Ireland Assembly for North Antrim (1998–2010)
David Perry	1967		Computer entrepreneur and creator of Earthworm Jim
Colin Davidson	1968		Artist
Paul Loughran	1969		Actor
Kathy Clugston	1969		BBC Radio 4 continuity announcer
Michelle McIlveen	1971		DUP MLA for Strangford (2007–), Junior Minister at the Office of the First Minister and deputy First Minister
Andrew J. Stewart	1971		Professor and Head of the Department of Computer Science, University of Manchester
Niall Malone	1971		Ireland and Leicester Tigers rugby player
Jeremy Davidson	1974		Ireland, British and Irish Lions, Ulster and London Irish rugby player
Niall Stanage	1974		Journalist and associate editor of The Hill
Phil Murphy	1976		Canada and London Irish rugby player
Myolie Wu	1979		Actress and singer in Hong Kong and Mainland China
Peter McColl	1980		Public intellectual, former Lord Rector of the University of Edinburgh
Jenny McDonough	1981		Former Ireland women's field hockey international
Jamie Dornan	1982		Model and Oscar nominated actor, known for his roles in Belfast, Fifty Shades of Grey and The Fall
Paul Marshall	1985		Ulster and Ireland rugby player
Gary Wilson	1986		Ulster and Ireland International cricketer
Matthew McBriar	1986		Part of the electronic music duo Bicep
Andy Ferguson	1987		Part of the electronic music duo Bicep
Mark Ryder	1989		Actor, known for his role in the TV series Borgia
Craig Gilroy	1991		Ulster and Ireland rugby player
Paddy Jackson	1992		London Irish, USA Perpignan, Ulster and Ireland rugby player
Christina Bennington	1992		Actress and singer, known for originating the lead role of Raven in Bat Out of Hell: The Musical
Rebecca Shorten	1993		International rower
Ethan McIlroy	2000		Ulster rugby player
Tom Edgar	2004		GT4 British racing driver
Amy Hunter	2005		International cricketer
