= Ewart Bell =

Ireland international rugby union player & civil servant (1924–2001)

- Born: Sir William Ewart Bell; 13 November 1924 Belfast, Northern Ireland
- Died: 2 January 2001 (aged 76)
- School: Methodist College Belfast
- University: Wadham College, Oxford
- Occupation(s): Teacher; Civil servant

Rugby union career
Amateur team(s)
| Years | Team | Apps | (Points) |
- Oxford University RFC
| – | Cheltenham RFC | | |
| – | Collegians | | |
Provincial / State sides
| Years | Team | Apps | (Points) |
- Ulster
International career
| Years | Team | Apps | (Points) |
| 1953 | Ireland | | |

Sir William Ewart Bell (13 November 1924 – 2 January 2001) was an Irish Rugby Union player and civil servant who became a Rugby Union administrator later in life. He was President of the Irish Rugby Football Union (IRFU) and Chair of the 1995 Rugby World Cup. He was Permanent Secretary at the United Kingdom Northern Ireland Office from 1979 to 1984, a time marked by Republican hunger strikes.

== Early life ==
Ewart Bell was born in Belfast to Rev. Dr. Frederick George Bell, a Presbyterian minister. His mother was a teacher, and he was the eldest of three children. He attended Methodist College Belfast, where he was Head Boy and Captain of the Rugby First XV. He attended Wadham College, Oxford, where he studied mathematics. In 1946 he went to Cheltenham College where he taught mathematics.

== Civil Service ==
In 1948 he joined the Ministry of Health in the Northern Ireland Government. He moved in 1952 to the Ministry of Commerce, where he was assistant secretary (1962) and secretary (1970). He led the diversification of Northern Ireland's economy into areas including pharmaceuticals and chemical manufacturing thus reducing dependence on textiles, ship manufacturing and agriculture. He was appointed Permanent Secretary at the Department of Finance in 1976 and became Head of the Northern Ireland Civil Service in 1979. He retained this position until 1984.

He was admitted to the KCB in 1982.

== Rugby Union ==
Bell played Rugby Union for Oxford University, Cheltenham, Collegians and Ulster. In 1953 he made his international debut for Ireland against France. He played all four Five Nations matches for Ireland that year.

Following retirement he became involved in rugby administration. He was president of the Ulster Branch of the Irish Rugby Football Union, a member of the IRFU Committee, and its president in 1986–1987. He went on to be a member and subsequently Chair of the International Rugby Board. He was appointed President of the Rugby World Cup in 1993, where he presided over the 1995 Rugby World Cup in South Africa.
