= Stephen Irwin (judge) =

British judge

The Right Honourable Sir Stephen Irwin

Lord Justice of Appeal
- In office September 2016 – October 2020
- Monarch: Queen Elizabeth II

Justice of the High Court
- In office May 2006 – September 2016

Personal details
- Born: Stephen John Irwin; 5 February 1953 (age 73) Northern Ireland
- Spouse: Deborah Rose Ann Spring (m. 1978)
- Children: 3
- Education: Methodist College Belfast; Jesus College, Cambridge

Sir Stephen John Irwin (born 5 February 1953), is a retired British judge and barrister. From September 2016 until October 2020, he was a Lord Justice of Appeal (an ordinary judge of the Court of Appeal of England and Wales). From May 2006 to 2016, he served as a judge of the High Court of England and Wales.

== Early life and education ==
Irwin was born on 5 February 1953 in Helen's Bay, Northern Ireland. He was educated at Methodist College Belfast, a grammar school in Belfast, Northern Ireland. Having gained an open scholarship, he studied law and English at Jesus College, Cambridge. He graduated from the University of Cambridge with a Bachelor of Arts (BA) degree in 1975. He then undertook a year of training in order to qualify as a barrister.

== Legal career ==
In 1976, Irwin was called to the bar by Gray's Inn. He then practised as a barrister, and specialised in "clinical negligence, enquiries and scientific tort cases". On 8 April 1997, he was appointed a Queen's Counsel (QC). In 1999, he was appointed an Assistant Recorder; as such, he served as a part-time judge in addition to practising a barrister. On 18 July 2000, he was appointed a Recorder of the South Eastern Circuit. During the 2002/2003 tax year, he received £314,000 in legal aid fees; "Mr Irwin received £314,000, most of which is likely to relate to a group action over Gulf war syndrome against the Ministry of Defence which collapsed this year when legal aid was withdrawn because of a lack of scientific evidence.". In 2004, he served as Chairman of the Bar Council.

In 2020, Irwin was elected Master Treasurer of Gray's Inn and is customarily referred to as 'Master Irwin' when acting in his capacity as a bencher.

=== Judiciary ===
On 18 May 2006, Irwin was appointed a judge of the High Court of Justice (Queen's Bench Division). From 2008 to 2012, he was a Presiding Judge on the Northern Circuit. In 2012, he was appointed a Member of the Special Immigration Appeals Commission (SIAC). The SIAC has been described as the "most controversial" and "most secret court within English law". From January 2013 to December 2015, he served as Chairman of the SIAC. On 1 October 2016, he was appointed a Lord Justice of Appeal. He retired from full-time judicial duties on 7 October 2020 but continues to sit part-time as Deputy Lord Justice of Appeal.

In November 2020 Irwin was announced as the part-time Chair of the House of Commons Independent Expert Panel which adjudicates complaints of bullying, harassment or sexual harassment brought against Members of Parliament.

== Personal life ==
In 1978, Irwin married Deborah Rose Ann Spring. Together they have three children; two daughters and one son. From 2012 to 2015, he served as Chair of the Poetry Society.

== Honours ==
In 2006, as is customary for newly appointed High Court Judges, Irwin was made a Knight Bachelor and therefore granted the title Sir. On 24 October 2016, he was appointed a Member of the Privy Council of the United Kingdom, and therefore granted the style of The Right Honourable.
