= William Abraham (British Army officer) =

Major-General Sir William Abraham CBE FGS
- Abraham in 1955
- Born: 21 August 1897; Enniskillen, Ireland
- Died: 6 February 1980 (aged 82); Lechlade, England
- Military career
- Allegiance: United Kingdom
- Branch: British Army
- Service years: 1920–1938; 1940–1946
- Rank: Major-General
- Commands: Upper Burma Battalion (1933–38)
- Conflicts: Second World War
- Awards: Knight Bachelor; Commander of the Order of the British Empire; Mentioned in Despatches (2)

Major-General Sir William Ernest Victor Abraham, CBE, FGS (21 August 1897 – 6 February 1980) was a British Army officer who served in India and Burma during the Second World War. He was nicknamed 'WEVA'.

== Early life and education ==
Abraham was born in Enniskillen, Ireland, and educated at Methodist College Belfast and the Royal College of Science, Dublin.

== Military service ==
Abraham visited Burma and India as a geologist from 1920 to 1937 with the Burmah Oil Company. He also commanded the Upper Burma Battalion of the Burma Auxiliary Force from 1932 to 1937 as a lieutenant-colonel. In 1940, during the Second World War, he rejoined the army as a second lieutenant in the Royal Engineers after the War Office asked him to analyse the events in France. He then attended the Staff College, Camberley. He was appointed an Officer of the Order of the British Empire and mentioned in despatches twice for his service in the Middle East. His actions in Tunisia resulted in him being appointed a Commander of the Order of the British Empire in 1942. He was promoted to the acting rank of major-general in 1945. That year, he was appointed Comptroller General of Military Economy in India.

His report, Summary of the economic developments in the Far East during the six months ending 30th June, 1944, is held in the Liddell Hart Centre for Military Archives, King's College London.

== Later career ==
Abraham worked as managing director of Burmah Oil Company until 1955. From 1962 until 1977 Sir William was national chairman of the Burma Star Association. He was knighted in the 1977 Queen's Silver Jubilee and Birthday Honours List. He was elected as a Fellow of the Indian National Science Academy in 1936. From 1961 to 1970, he was a lay member of the Restrictive Practices Court.

== Personal life ==
Abraham married Susan Jeanette Bidwell in 1928. They had one son and two daughters. After Susan's death in 1965, Abraham married Rosemary Eustace. She died, aged 104, in 2019.

== See also ==
- List of British generals and brigadiers

== Bibliography ==
- Smart, Nick (2005). Biographical Dictionary of British Generals of the Second World War. Barnesley: Pen & Sword. ISBN 1844150496.
