= Bertha McDougall =

Bertha McDougall, OBE was the interim Commissioner for Victims and Survivors of the Troubles. She was appointed in October 2005 by Peter Hain to look at key areas relating to services for victims, funding arrangements in relation to services and grants paid to victims and survivors groups and individual victims and survivors.

Mrs. McDougall is a police widow who lives in Belfast. Her husband Lindsay, a civil servant and part-time Royal Ulster Constabulary Reservist, was shot dead by the Irish National Liberation Army in January 1981 while on duty in Belfast.

She is chairman of the victims' group, Forgotten Families, which was set up to lobby on behalf of pre-1982 widows. She is also a member of the Phoenix Energy for Children Charitable Trust.

Bertha McDougall was educated at Methodist College Belfast. She was a school teacher at the Fane Street Primary School in Belfast for 15 years before being seconded to the Northern Ireland Council for Educational Development, where she is co-ordinator for EMU (Education for Mutual Understanding) in cross community projects.

Her last position was as Principal Officer with the Council for Curriculum Examinations and Assessment (CCEA). Most recently she worked with the Council for the Curriculum Examinations and Assessment.
