= British Schools Chess Championship =

The British Schools Chess Championship is an annual competition for school chess teams that has been in existence continuously from 1958. The tournament is administered by the English Chess Federation and is open to all schools from the United Kingdom. The competition has been won by teams from all four countries of the UK.

== Eligibility ==
Entry is open to any school in England, Scotland, Wales and Northern Ireland. All players must be under-19 on 31 August of the year in which the competition begins. Teams are made up of six players.

== Sponsorship ==
In 1938 The Sunday Times (UK) made an offer to the then British Chess Federation to donate a trophy for a competition between teams from Public schools. Before further investigation of this offer could be completed the war intervened. Finally in 1957-58 competition got under way under the sponsorship of The Sunday Times (UK) newspaper. Their patronage continued until 1983, when their sister paper The Times took over. Since the withdrawal of sponsorship by The Times after the 2001 finals, the championship continued without a sponsor until 2008.

At the height of popularity in the 1970s, in excess of 1000 teams took part, but since then a decline in the number of teams has taken place. In 2007-08, the accepted entry increased from 93 teams to 135 teams, which represented the highest number of entries for four years. Yateley Manor School, from Yateley in Hampshire, sponsors from 2008-2011, supported the event through a difficult period and deserve special mention.

The competition, now known as the National Schools Chess Championships, was relaunched by the English Chess Federation in 2012 with sponsorship from St Catherine's School, Bramley to support a tournament for girls, with both U11 and U19 sections, Heathside Preparatory School, from Hampstead, London for a new U11 open section and Winchester College for the U19 open section.

== National finalists ==
=== 1950s ===
| | Winners | Runners Up | 3rd Place | 4th Place | ENTRY |
| 1958 | Calday Grange GS, Wirral | Varndean | Nottingham High School | Colfe's School | 241 |
| 1959 | Calday Grange GS, Wirral | William Ellis, London | Queen Elizabeth's GS, Barnet | Glyn Grammar School, Ewell | 247 |

=== 1960s ===
| | Winners | Runners Up | 3rd Place | 4th Place | ENTRY |
| 1960 | Wolverhampton Grammar School | Huddersfield New College | Bishop Vesey's Grammar School | Winchester College | 331 |
| 1961 | Colfe's School | Hove Grammar School | Weston-Super-Mare Grammar School | Bradford Grammar School | 358 |
| 1962 | Liverpool Institute | Bemrose School | King Edward's School, Birmingham | Whitgift School | 390 |
| 1963 | Hove Grammar School | Colfe's School | Liverpool Institute | Magdalen College School, Oxford | 489 |
| 1964 | Liverpool Institute | Dulwich College | Hove Grammar School | Wyggeston Grammar School for Boys | 580 |
| 1965 | Dulwich College | Wallasey Grammar School | Allan Glen's School, Glasgow | Hayes County Grammar School | 673 |
| 1966 | Dulwich College | Manchester Grammar School | Hove Grammar School | Bradford Grammar School | 703 |
| 1967 | Battersea Grammar School | King Edward VI School, Nuneaton | Wintringham Grammar School | Trinity School, Croydon | 706 |
| 1968 | Bolton School | Dulwich College | Battersea Grammar School | Great Yarmouth Grammar School | 789 |
| 1969 | High School of Dundee | King Edward's School, Birmingham | Trinity School, Croydon | King Edward VII School (Sheffield) | |

=== 1970s ===
| | Winners | Runners Up | 3rd Place | 4th Place | ENTRY |
| 1970 | Dulwich College | Ayr Academy | Methodist College Belfast | Manchester Grammar School | 761 |
| 1971 | Ayr Academy | Manchester Grammar School | Ilford County High School | Plymouth College | |
| 1972 | Ayr Academy | Dulwich College | Trinity School, Croydon | Manchester Grammar School | 760 |
| 1973 | Bolton School | Latymer Upper School | Bristol Grammar School | Glyn Grammar School, Ewell | 846 |
| 1974 | Southern Grammar School, Portsmouth | Bedford Modern School | King Edward's School, Birmingham | Paisley Grammar School | 961 |
| 1975 | St Paul's School, London | Ilford County High School | Southern Grammar School, Portsmouth | Bristol Grammar School | |
| 1976 | Bolton School | Great Salterne, Portsmouth | Glyn Grammar Grammar School, Ewell | Royal Belfast Academical Institution | |
| 1977 | Bluecoat School, Liverpool | Glyn Grammar School, Ewell | Paisley Grammar School | Bristol Grammar School | |
| 1978 | St Paul's School, London | St Albans School | Royal Grammar School, Newcastle | Bluecoat School, Liverpool | |
| 1979 | St Paul's School, London | Bolton School | Methodist College Belfast | King Edward VI School, Southampton | |

=== 1980s ===
| | Winners | Runners Up | 3rd Place | 4th Place | ENTRY |
| 1980 | King Edward VI School, Southampton | Watford Grammar School for Boys | Calday Grange GS, Wirral | Royal Belfast Academical Institution | |
| 1981 | St Paul's School, London | Watford Grammar School for Boys | Manchester Grammar School | King Edward VI School, Southampton | |
| 1982 | St Paul's School, London | Nottingham High School | St John's College (Portsmouth) | Bluecoat School, Liverpool | |
| 1983 | Queen Mary's GS, Walsall | Paston Grammar School, North Walsham | Royal Grammar School, Newcastle | Grove School, St Leonards | |
| 1984 | Royal Grammar School, Newcastle | Plymouth College | St Paul's School, London | Queen Mary's GS, Walsall | |
| 1985 | St Paul's School, London | Nottingham High School | Royal Grammar School, Newcastle | King Edward VI School, Southampton | |
| 1986 | Plymouth College | Colchester Royal Grammar School | Bluecoat School, Liverpool | Methodist College Belfast | |
| 1987 | Queen Mary's GS, Walsall | St Paul's School, London | Millfield School | Greenwood Academy, Irvine | |
| 1988 | St Paul's School, London | Abingdon School | Queen Mary's GS, Walsall | Antrim Grammar School | 358 |
| 1989 | St Paul's School, London | Manchester Grammar School | Truro School | Antrim Grammar School | |

=== 1990s ===
| | Winners | Runners Up | 3rd Place | 4th Place | ENTRY |
| 1990 | St Paul's School, London | Truro School | Royal Grammar School, Newcastle | Nottingham High School | |
| 1991 | Manchester Grammar School | Sutton Manor School, Surrey | Hymers College, Hull | St Columb's College, Derry | |
| 1992 | Nottingham High School 'A' | Truro School | City of London School | Royal Grammar School, Newcastle | |
| 1993 | Truro School | Haberdashers' Aske's School, Elstree | Manchester Grammar School | Royal Grammar School, Newcastle | |
| 1994 | Ipswich School | Manchester Grammar School | St Columb's College, Derry | Westminster School | |
| 1995 | Methodist College Belfast | Maidstone Grammar School | Truro School | Ipswich School | |
| 1996 | Manchester Grammar School | Maidstone Grammar School | Oakham School | St Columb's College, Derry | |
| 1997 | Manchester Grammar School | Oakham School | Hampton School | Methodist College Belfast | |
| 1998 | Manchester Grammar School | Torquay Boys' Grammar School | St Paul's School, London | Queen Elizabeth GS, Wakefield | |
| 1999 | St Paul's School, London | Oakham School | Manchester Grammar School | Torquay Boys' Grammar School | |

=== 2000s ===
| | Winners | Runners Up | 3rd Place | 4th Place | ENTRY |
| 2000 | St Paul's School, London | Manchester Grammar School | Nottingham High School | Queen Elizabeth's GS, Barnet | 208 |
| 2001 | Oakham School | Manchester Grammar School | St Paul's School, London | Yateley Manor Prep School | 246 |
| 2002 | Hampton School | Royal Grammar School, Guildford | Oakham School | Manchester Grammar School | 192 |
| 2003 | Oakham School | Royal Grammar School, Guildford | Southend High School | Blue Coat School, Oldham | 153 |
| 2004 | Monmouth School | Haberdashers' Aske's School, Elstree | Blue Coat School, Oldham | Southend High School | 143 |
| 2005 | Nottingham High School 'A' | Blue Coat School, Oldham | Monmouth School | Royal Grammar School, Guildford | 126 |
| 2006 | Nottingham High School 'A' | Dulwich College | Millfield School | Lancaster Royal Grammar School | 93 |
| 2007 | Nottingham High School 'A' | Royal Grammar School, Guildford | Magdalen College School, Oxford | Manchester Grammar School | 93 |
| 2008 | Millfield School | Nottingham High School 'A' | Haberdashers' Aske's School, Elstree | Royal Grammar School, Guildford | 140 |
| 2009 | Wellington College, Berkshire | Nottingham High School 'A' | Norwich School | Dulwich College | 157 |

=== 2010-2015 ===
| | Winners | Runners Up | 3rd Place | 4th Place | ENTRY |
| 2010 | Wellington College, Berkshire | Haberdashers' Aske's School, Elstree | Wilson's School, Wallington | Manchester Grammar School | 165 |
| 2011 | Manchester Grammar School | Reading School | Royal Grammar School, Guildford | Norwich School | 153 |
| 2012 | Manchester Grammar School | Wellington College, Berkshire | Haberdashers' Aske's School, Elstree | Millfield School | 114 |
| 2013 | Manchester Grammar School | Reading School | Haberdashers' Aske's School, Elstree | Wilson's School, Wallington | 135 |
| 2014 | Reading School | Manchester Grammar School | Royal Grammar School, Guildford | Hampton School | 102 |
| 2015 | Haberdashers' Aske's School, Elstree | Reading School | Nottingham High School | Hampton School | 102 |

=== 2016 onwards ===
From the 2016 final onwards 16 schools played at the final, with the plate trophy going to the best result by a first round loser.

| | Winners | Runners Up | 3rd Place= | Plate winner | ENTRY |
| 2016 | Reading School | Hampton School | Millfield School, Royal Grammar School, Guildford, King Edward VI Chelmsford | City of London School | 124 |
| 2017 | Royal Grammar School, Guildford | Hampton School | Reading School, Haberdashers' Aske's School, Elstree, Queen Elizabeth's GS, Barnet | King Edward's School Birmingham | 130 |
| 2018 | Reading School | Royal Grammar School, Guildford | City of London School, Hampton School, Nottingham High School | Brighton College | 163 |
| 2019 | City of London School | Hampton School | Reading School, Royal Grammar School, Guildford, Royal Grammar School, Newcastle | St Olave's Grammar School | 142 |
| 2022 | Westminster School | King's College School | Wilson's School, Haberdashers' Aske's Boys' School, St Olave's Grammar School | Brentwood School | 112 |
| 2023 | Hampton School | Wilson's School | Queen Elizabeth's School, Barnet | Queen Elizabeth's School, Barnet | |
| 2024 | King's College School | Hampton School | Tiffin School | University College School | |

In 2020 the finals were not played due to the ongoing COVID-19 pandemic. There was no competition in 2020-21.

== Plate ==
=== 1990s ===
| | Winners | Runners Up | 3rd Place |
| 1994 | Methodist College Belfast | Winchester College | |
| 1995 | St Columb's College, Derry | | |
| 1996 | Tiffin School | | |
| 1997 | St Olave's Grammar School, Orpington | King Edward's (Camp Hill), Birmingham | |
| 1998 | King's College, Wimbledon | | |
| 1999 | King's College, Wimbledon | | |

=== 2000s ===
| | Winners | Runners Up | 3rd Place |
| 2000 | Oakham School | | |
| 2001 | Hampton School | Greenwood Academy, Irvine | King Edward VI Edgbaston Park Road, Birmingham & Dr Challoners GS, Amersham |

| | Winners | Runners Up | 3rd Place | 4th Place |
| 2002 | Blue Coat School, Oldham | King Edward's Camp Hill, Birmingham | St Olave's Grammar School, Orpington | Torquay Boys' Grammar School |
| 2003 | Manchester Grammar School | Nottingham High School B Team | City of London School | St Olave's Grammar School, Orpington |
| 2004 | Nottingham High School | Commonwealth School, Swindon | St Olave's Grammar School, Orpington | Lancaster Royal Grammar School |
| 2005 | Hampton School | Nottingham High School B Team | Oakham School | Southend High School |
| 2006 | Monmouth School | Haberdashers' Aske's School, Elstree | Royal Grammar School, Guildford | Yarm School |
| 2007 | Monmouth School | King Edward's School, Birmingham | Queen Elizabeth's GS, Barnet | Aughton St Michael's Primary, Ormskirk |
| 2008 | Wilson's School, Wallington | Wellington College, Berkshire | Nottingham High School B Team | Leeds Grammar School |
| 2009 | Wilson's School, Wallington | Reading School | Winchester College | Aughton St Michael's Primary, Ormskirk |

=== 2010s ===
| | Winners | Runners Up | 3rd Place | 4th Place |
| 2010 | Homefield Prep School | Millfield School | King Edward's Camp Hill, Birmingham | Aughton St Michael's Primary, Ormskirk |
| 2011 | Wellington College | St Olave's Grammar School | Grammar School at Leeds | Magdalen College School |
| 2012 | Reading School | Wilson's School, Wallington | King Edward's School, Birmingham | Not Awarded |
| 2013 | Hampton School | Queen Elizabeth's GS, Barnet | Royal Grammar School, Guildford | Nottingham High School B Team |
| 2014 | Wilson's School, Wallington | Queen Elizabeth's GS, Barnet | Torquay Boys' Grammar School | Newcastle-under-Lyme School |
| 2015 | Eltham College | King's School, Chester | Royal Grammar School, Guildford | Mill Hill County High School |

Until 2015 there was an age handicap system in operation based on the average age of each team.

Age Handicap
| Age Difference | Winning score for older team |
|---|---|
| 0 to 11 months | No handicap - board count |
| 1 year to 1 year 11 months | 3.5-2.5 |
| 2 years to 2 years 11 months | 4-2 |
| 3 years to 3 years 11 months | 4.5-1.5 |
| 4 years or more | 5-1 |

Teams initially compete in regional zones with the winner of each zone progressing to the National stage of the competition. There were four occasions where Primary Schools won their Regional finals against older teams. Two of these occasions were by St Teresa's RC Primary School, Colchester., the school being awarded a one-off "Best School in Chess" title in 1996

== Sources ==
- The Times
- The Sunday Times (UK)
- Southern Counties Chess Union Website
