= Cecilia Galloway =

Cecilia Galloway has been a headmistress in England and Northern Ireland and was a school adjudicator appointed by the Office of the Schools Adjudicator. Born in 1955, she studied chemistry at Leeds University. Later gaining an MSc degree at Reading University, she was accepted as a Fellow by the Royal Society of Chemistry and given Chartered Chemist status. She has a law degree from Buckingham University.

Entering the teaching profession in 1978 at the Wolverhampton Grammar School for Boys, she taught chemistry for the early part of her career, moving on into school management.

Joining the Royal Latin School as their first female headteacher in 1992, she enlarged the school from 700 pupils to its current 1200. In 1999 she was described as providing "inspirational leadership" at the Royal Latin School by John Bercow MP, in the House of Commons. In 2000, she was awarded for "Contribution to School Leadership in a Secondary School". An Ofsted Inspector herself, Ofsted praised her leadership, saying: "The leadership and management of the school are particularly efficient with the vision and drive of the headteacher outstanding". Under her guidance the school obtained Investors in People status, gained a Silver Artsmark award, and was designated a Specialist school in Science.

In 2006 Galloway became the first female head, at Methodist College Belfast, a co-educational voluntary grammar school of 1,800 pupils. Taking her self-described "democratic", "transparent" and "straight-talking" leadership style with her, she introduced changes. It was reported that these were not received well, with one newspaper claiming that staff compared her to Alan Sugar. Rumours later circulated that Galloway was to leave the post after only a year, something she denied. However, in October 2006 she announced her resignation, citing personal reasons including "difficulties relocating to Belfast from England" and "problems with buying and selling property and the management of her husband's business interests".
