= Buckingham Chantry Chapel =

15th-century chapel in Buckingham, UK

Coordinates: 52.0003°N 0.9880°W

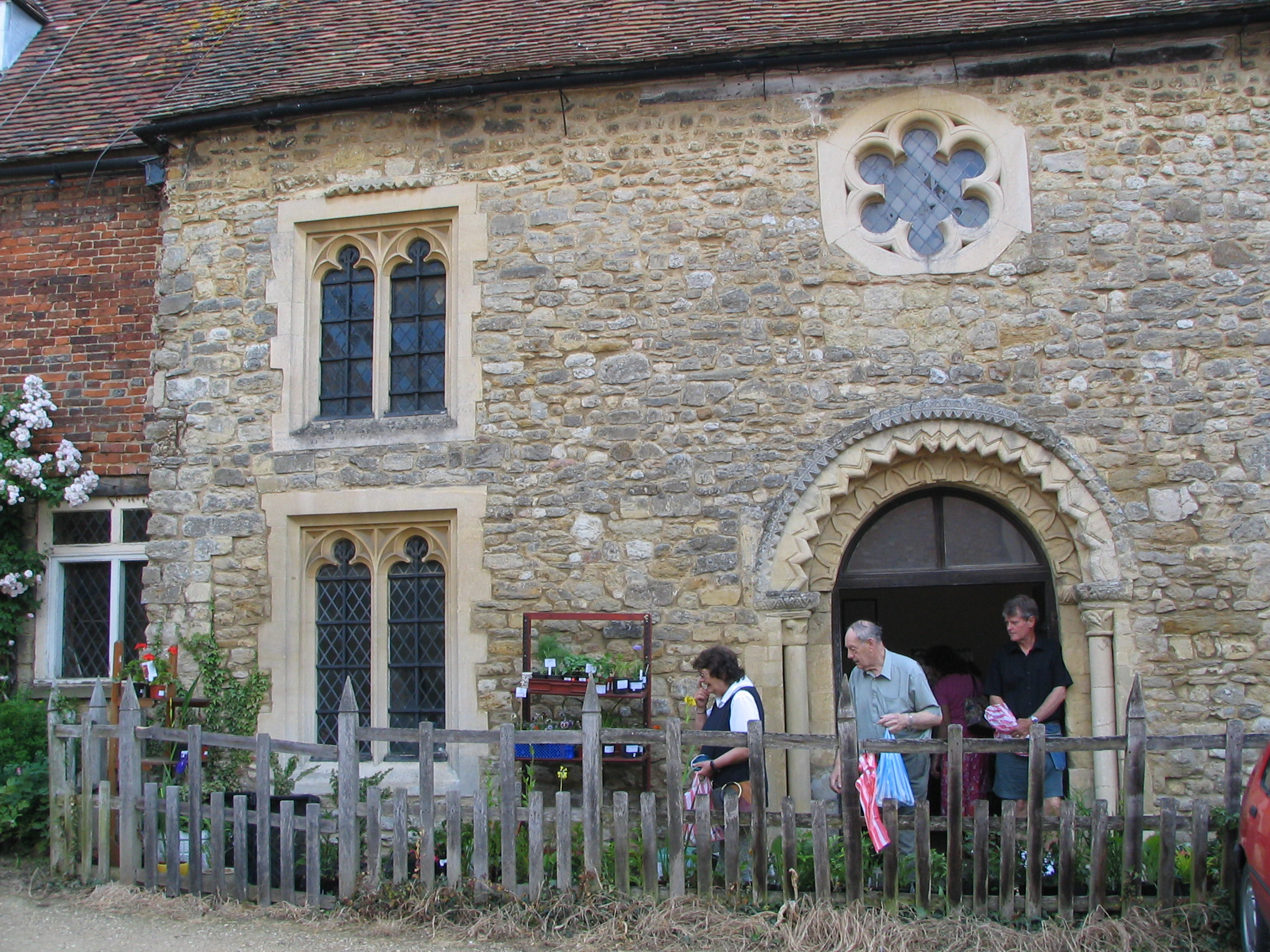
Chantry Chapel

Buckingham Chantry Chapel (also known as the Old Latin School) is a 15th-century chapel and a National Trust property in Buckingham, Buckinghamshire, England. The chapel is the oldest building in Buckingham and is noted in particular for its Norman doorway. Few buildings in Buckingham date to before the 18th century, as a large fire destroyed much of the town in 1725. The chapel is a Grade II* listed building, being added to the list by English Heritage on 13 October 1952.

== History ==
The building was originally established as a hospital in the 12th century. It became a chantry chapel in 1268, founded by Matthew de Stratton, the Archdeacon of Buckingham. The present building dates from the 15th century, when John Ruding, Archdeacon of Lincoln, undertook rebuilding work in 1471 and 1481.

The building was later used by the Royal Latin School, with the chantry priests probably serving as the first schoolmasters. A schoolmaster's house was added to the north. The school remained on the site until 1907, when expansion prompted a move to new buildings on Chandos Road.

Further restoration work was undertaken by Sir George Gilbert Scott in 1875.

The chapel was given to the National Trust in 1912. It is still owned by the Trust, and is open to the public as a second-hand bookshop.
