= Commissioner for Victims and Survivors for Northern Ireland =

The Commissioner for Victims and Survivors (CVSNI) was established on 24 October 2005 by Peter Hain, Secretary of State for Northern Ireland, who named Bertha McDougall as the first (interim) commissioner. The Commission was established by the Victims and Survivors (Northern Ireland) Order 2006. It is a non-departmental public body sponsored by the Office of the First Minister and deputy First Minister.

The current commissioner is Joe McVey OBE. He was appointed in 2025 by the First Minister and deputy First Minister for Northern Ireland.

The Statutory Duties and Powers of the Commissioner are outlined in the Victims and Survivors (Northern Ireland) Order 2006 as amended by the Commission for Victims and Survivors Act (Northern Ireland) 2008. They can be summarised as follows:

- Promoting an awareness of matters relating to the interests of victims and survivors and of the need to safeguard those interests
- Keeping under review the adequacy and effectiveness of law and practice affecting the interests of victims and survivors
- Keeping under review the adequacy and effectiveness of services provided for the victims and survivors by bodies or persons
- Advising the Secretary of State, the Executive Committee of the Assembly and anybody or person providing services for victims and survivors on matters concerning the interests of victims and survivors
- Taking reasonable steps to ensure that the views of victims and survivors are sought
- Making arrangements for a Forum for consultation and discussion with victims and survivors

== Definitions of the terms “victim” and ”survivor” ==
The definitions of the terms “victim” and ”survivor” are outlined in the Victims and Survivors (Northern Ireland) Order 2006, which states:

In this Order references to “victim and survivor” are references to an individual appearing to the Commissioner to be any of the following:

a) someone who is or has been physically or psychologically injured as a result of or in consequence of a conflict-related incident

b) someone who provides a substantial amount of care on a regular basis for an individual mentioned in paragraph (a)

c) someone who has been bereaved as a result of or in consequence of a conflict-related incident

An individual may be psychologically injured as a result of or in consequence of:

a) witnessing a conflict-related incident or the consequences of such an incident

b) providing medical or other emergency assistance to an individual in connection with a conflict-related incident
