= Royal Latin School =

Location
- Chandos Road; Buckingham, Buckinghamshire, MK18 1AX; England; 51°59′36″N 0°59′10″W

Information
- Type: Academy Grammar School
- Motto: "Alle may God amende" (Ruding 1423) "High expectations for all" (1993)
- Religious affiliation: Christian
- Established: c. 1423; 603 years ago
- Founder: King Edward VI (by royal charter)
- Specialist: Science College, Training school
- Department for Education URN: 137344 Tables
- Ofsted: Reports
- Chair of Governors: Naveed Razak Sheikh
- Staff: 160+
- Gender: Coeducational
- Age: 11 to 18
- Enrolment: 1260+
- Sixth form students: 390+
- Houses: 6
- Colours: Black and Red
- Publication: The Latin
- Website: www.royallatin.org

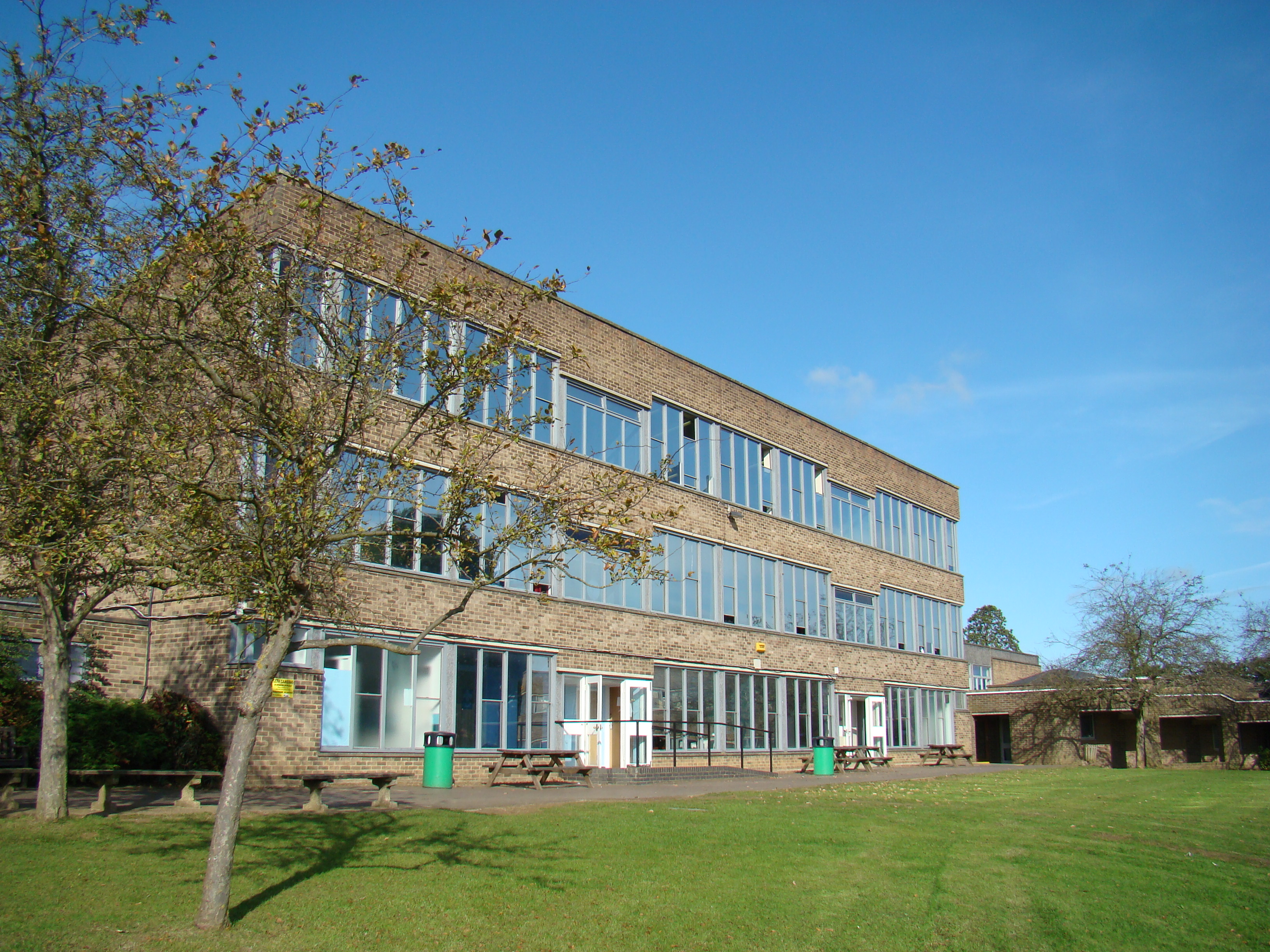
The Main Block

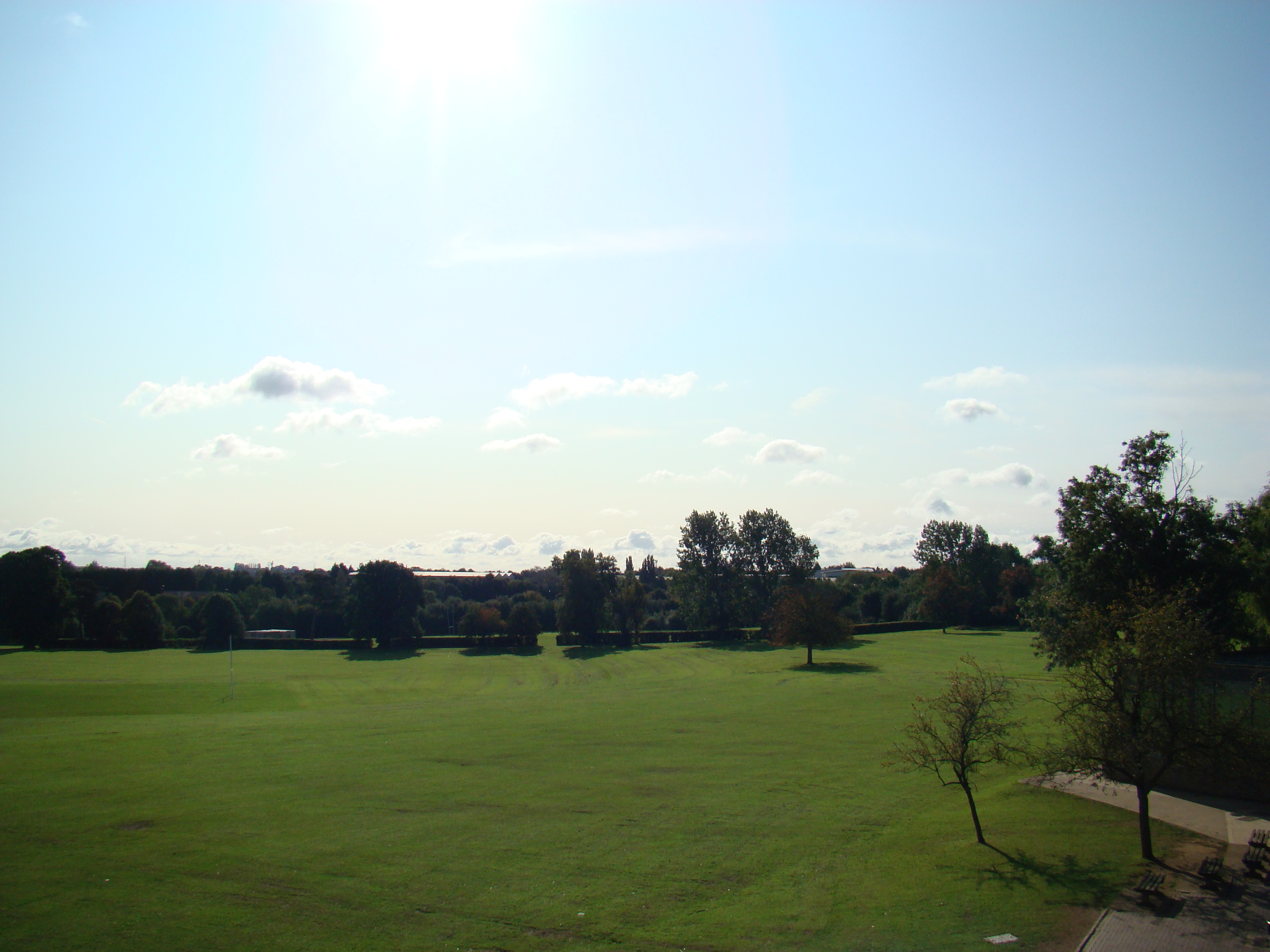
The fields

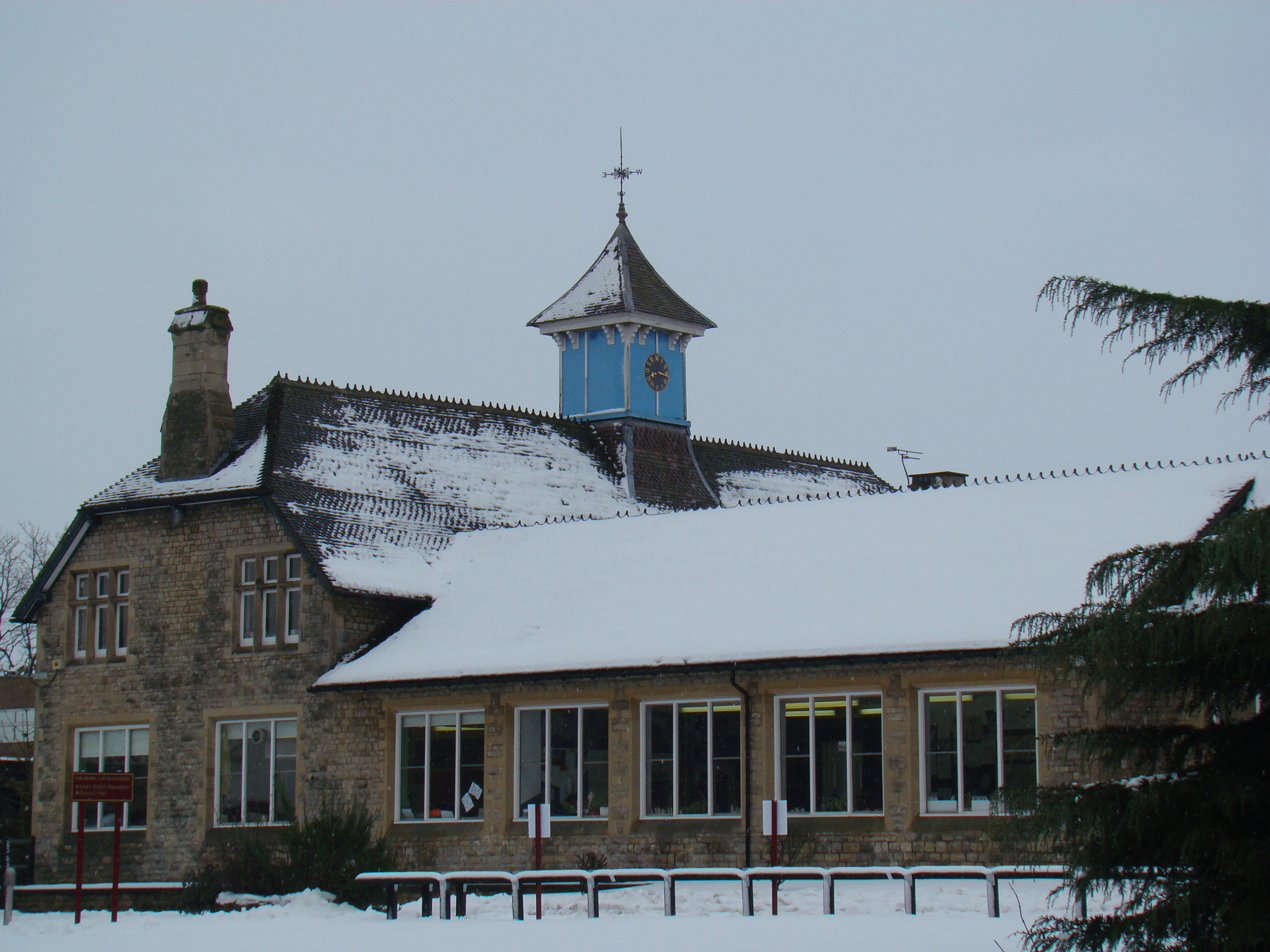
Brookfield House during the February 2009 Great Britain and Ireland snowfall

The Royal Latin School (RLS) is a co-educational grammar school in Buckingham, England. It has continually existed for over six hundred years; receiving a Royal Charter in this time and moving premises three times. In September 2011 the school became an academy. It takes children from the age of 11 through to the age of 18 and has over 1260 pupils, including a sixth form of 390 pupils. Every year it takes in 174 pupils, those who have passed the Eleven-plus exam and others admitted by a Selection Review Panel. It maintains a staff of just over 160. In September 2003 the school was designated by the Department for Education and Skills (DfES) as a Science College specialist school. It was successfully re-designated in 2007 and achieved a second specialism as a training school.

Since the county's boundary adjustments of 1974 placed Eton College in Berkshire, the Royal Latin School claims the distinction of being the sole Pre-Reformation grammar school in the county. The Royal Latin School was graded as good in the 2023 report by OFSTED.

== History ==
The school's earliest recorded reference occurs in 1423. A very small establishment at first, the school taught only six poor boys.

Although Buckingham's citizens supported Catherine of Aragon and her daughter Mary Tudor, and were opposed to the Reformation, the Chantry Chapel in which the Royal Latin School was based, rather than being destroyed by Edward VI (as many similar establishments were) was instead converted into the Royal Latin School. King Edward VI granted a charter for the school, for 30-40 pupils, in 1548 with an endowment of £10 and with 12 trustees. A major fire in 1696 destroyed the Master's House which was rebuilt by Alexander Denton, complete with a garden.

The Chantry Chapel dedicated to St John the Baptist and Thomas Becket had an original Romanesque doorway, and served as the main schoolroom. An early 19th-century Master was the Oxford-educated aristocrat Rev William Eyre MA, the vicar of Padbury. It remained the home of the Royal Latin School until 1907 when Buckinghamshire County Council provided major new buildings for the school in Chandos Road, now the site of Grenville School and did so again in 1963, when the school moved to Brookfield House, formerly The Mount. Numerous extensions in 1963 were opened by Queen Elizabeth the Queen Mother, with further extensions being gradually added over the next few decades. The warm brown brickwork of the 1963 extensions complements the stone-built structure of the earlier buildings, the whole is enhanced by its parkland setting on the outskirts of Buckingham. Brookfield House and its grounds have been expanded over recent years to accommodate the growing size of the school and the fact that many of the older buildings, given the larger number of students, were becoming inadequate for use on such a large scale.

In 2006, the U15 rugby side made school history by becoming the first side from the Royal Latin to reach the semi-finals of the Daily Mail Vase, the English schools' annual rugby union cup competition. The U15s surpassed this record in 2013 reaching the final at Twickenham Stadium, where they beat Felsted School 19–13 to win the vase. The U13 girls' team (rugby) won girls nationals in 2015 and were unbeaten in the 2017–18 season.

In 2015, the first of three projects known as the 'RLS 600 Campaign' was completed. This was a two-storey science laboratory with 13 classrooms for expanding further the knowledge of sciences for the students. The next project was a Sports Campus, opened in September 2021. The final project will be an Arts Department, which the school aims to complete before its 600th anniversary in 2023.

== School buildings ==
Brookfield House was formerly the boys' boarding house. It is a former hunting lodge that houses the school offices and reception, the school library, conference room, art department, music department and some science and drama laboratories and rooms. Rotherfield House was formerly the girls' boarding house. It houses the sixth form classrooms and common room, as well as the school lecture theatre, school archives, a computer suite and alumni rooms and offices.

The Main Block, built in 1963 by Fred Pooley, houses the school hall, old gymnasium, stage (both indoor and outdoor) and drama department, student reception, school offices, English department, humanities department and the dining room. There is a separate technology block. New Block houses the mathematics department, the languages department, the economics and business studies department and some science laboratories.

There is a sports hall and the ek robotics sports campus. The school opened its floodlit 3G pitch on September 25, 2020. The ek robotics sports Campus opened in November 2021 consisting of the VIVA fitness suite, mind and body zone as well as the Racelogic sports lab.

The school's Discovery Centre is a 12-classroom building for sciences that also contains conference rooms. The building was opened on 2 October 2015 by Robert Winston and John Bercow.

The school uses the church of St Peter and St Paul's in Buckingham for its annual carol service and Founder's Day service, which is held on the feast day of St John, the patron saint of the school. The church is also used for various concerts throughout the year.

The Chantry Chapel, the school's former chapel, is now owned by the National Trust and is too small to accommodate the entire school, so all school religious ceremonies take place in the parish church.

== Organisation ==
=== Houses ===
Each pupil, upon entrance, is placed into one of six houses, named after founders of the school at various stages in its history. The six houses are:

Houses	Significance
Barton	Involved in founding schools both in the Chantry Chapel and in 1468, a grammar school in Thornton. These were combined to form the Royal Latin School during the 16th century.
Denton	Although Isobel Denton was mistakenly claimed to have founded the school during the sixteenth century, in the late 17th century Alexander Denton rebuilt the master's house following a destructive fire.
Newton	Gabriel Newton founded Green Coat Schools throughout England including in Buckingham. He provided an annual endowment of £26 which was transferred to the Royal Latin School in 1904.
Ruding	John Ruding was awarded the title of Archdeacon of Lincoln and Prebendary of Sutton upon Buckingham in 1471 and was therefore responsible for funding the upkeep of all church-owned buildings including that which subsequently housed the Royal Latin School.
Stratton	Stratton left support for the Buckingham Chantry Chapel to support his soul in purgatory when he died in 1268. The chantry priest he funded, later started the school at Buckingham.
Verney	As the school grew during the early 20th century it was forced to move from the Chantry Chapel to a new purpose-built site on Chandos Road (now the site of Grenville Combined School), a move made possible by the work of Lady Verney.

== Headmasters ==
Dates of office	Name
1524–1553	T. Hawkins (Chantry priest 1524)
1553–1569	Henry Webster
1574–1580	Alexander Sheppard
1580–1592	Thomas Potter
1592–1603	James Smith
1603–1609	Robert Tomlyns
1609–1625	Richard Earle
1625–1632	Richard Home
1633–1638	Thomas Dutton
1638–1660	Edward Ummant
1660–1664	Thomas Stephens
1664–1665	William Warters
1665–1682	Roger Griffiths (father of Mary Pix)
1682–1684	Thomas Dalby
1685–1690	Thomas Yeomans
1690–1691	Mark Noble
1691–1696	Robert Styles
1709–1715	Samuel Foster
1715–1723	Richard Cardwell
1723–1763	William Halstead
1763–1764	Vacant post
1764–1785	James Eyre
1785–1830	William Eyre
1830–1855	Edward Britten
1855–1858	Thomas Laugharne
1858–1861	Vacant post
1861–1869	Thomas Owain Jones
1869–1871	Louis Borissow (son of Christian Ignatius Borissow)
1871–1891	Thomas Cockram
1891–1895	Robert C. MacCulloch
1895–1896	Thomas Cockram
1896–1908	Walter Matthew Cox
1908–1931	William Fuller
1931–1935	Maurice Walton Thomas
1936–1939	Stanley Arthur Dyment
1939–1941	Henry Bert Toft
1941-1941	Donald E. Morgan
1942–1945	Charles Foster
1945–1948	Henry Bert Toft
1948–1979	George K. Embleton
1979–1992	Peter Luff
1992–2005	Cecilia Galloway
2006–2009	A. Robert Cooper
2010-2024	David Hudson
2024 -	Ian Chislett

== Notable former pupils ==
- Mary Pix, 17th century novelist and playwright
- Cecil Gardner, World War I Royal Air Force pilot
- Shan Morgan, CMG, diplomat and former ambassador to Argentina
- Air Marshal Sir Julian Young, KBE CB, Royal Air Force Chief Engineer
- Craig Pickering, Olympic athlete
- Dan Jones, writer
- Sam Baldock, footballer
- George Baldock, footballer

== See also ==
- List of the oldest schools in the United Kingdom
- List of the oldest schools in the world
- List of English and Welsh endowed schools (19th century)
